= List of Drum Corps International World Championship finalists =

The following is a comprehensive list of all drum corps that have appeared in Drum Corps International World Championship Finals. There was no 2020 DCI season due to the COVID-19 pandemic. There were no scored competitions in the 2021 DCI season.

Corps	Status	Finals Apps	Years of Finals appearances
Santa Clara Vanguard	Active	52	1972–2019, 2022, 2024-26
Blue Devils	Active	51	1974–2019, 2022–26
The Cavaliers	Active	51	1972, 1974–77, 1979–2019, 2022–26
Phantom Regiment	Active	51	1974–2019, 2022–26
The Cadets	Defunct	44	1975, 1977, 1980–2019, 2022–23
Madison Scouts	Active	42	1973–2001, 2003–06, 2008, 2010–15, 2017, 2024
Bluecoats	Active	37	1987–98, 2000–19, 2022–26
Crossmen	Active	29	1977–78, 1980–82, 1984, 1989–2004, 2012, 2014–19
Carolina Crown	Active	29	1995–2001, 2003–19, 2022–26
Blue Knights	Active	27	1991-94, 1996–2000, 2004–19, 2023, 2025-26
Boston Crusaders	Active	26	1999–2019, 2022–26
Blue Stars	Active	24	1972–79, 2008–11, 2013–19, 2022–26
Spirit of Atlanta	Active	21	1978–88, 1990, 2002–03, 2005–07, 2011–13, 2026
Glassmen	Defunct	16	1993–95, 1997–2002, 2004–10
27th Lancers	Defunct	12	1972–73, 1975–84
Troopers	Active	14	1972–75, 1979, 1981, 1985, 1986, 2009, 2022–26
Colts	Active	13	1993–96, 1998–99, 2001, 2007, 2022–26
Bridgemen	Defunct	10	1972–73, 1976–83
Freelancers	Defunct	10	1976–77, 1981–85, 1989, 1991–92
Star of Indiana	Defunct	9	1985–93
Velvet Knights	Defunct	8	1984–90, 1992
Suncoast Sound	Defunct	7	1983–89
Kilties	Defunct	6	1972–75, 1977–78
Magic of Orlando	Defunct	6	1994–97, 2002–03
Sky Ryders	Defunct	6	1982–83, 1986–88, 1991
Mandarins	Active	6	2018–19, 2022–25
Guardsmen	Defunct	4	1976, 1978–80
Anaheim Kingsmen	Defunct	3	1972–74
Muchachos	Defunct	3	1972–74
North Star	Defunct	3	1978–80
Argonne Rebels	Defunct	2	1972–73
Oakland Crusaders	Defunct	2	1975–76
Seneca Optimists	Defunct	2	1976–77
The Academy	Active	1	2016
Black Knights	Defunct	1	1973
Bleu Raeders	Defunct	1	1972
De La Salle Oaklands	Defunct	1	1974
Des Plaines Vanguard	Defunct	1	1972
Dutch Boy	Defunct	1	1990
Purple Lancers	Defunct	1	1974
Royal Crusaders	Defunct	1	1975
Seattle Cascades	Active	1	2002
Stockton Commodores	Defunct	1	1973

== See also ==
- Drum Corps International
