= Drum and bugle corps (classic) =

Musical ensembles

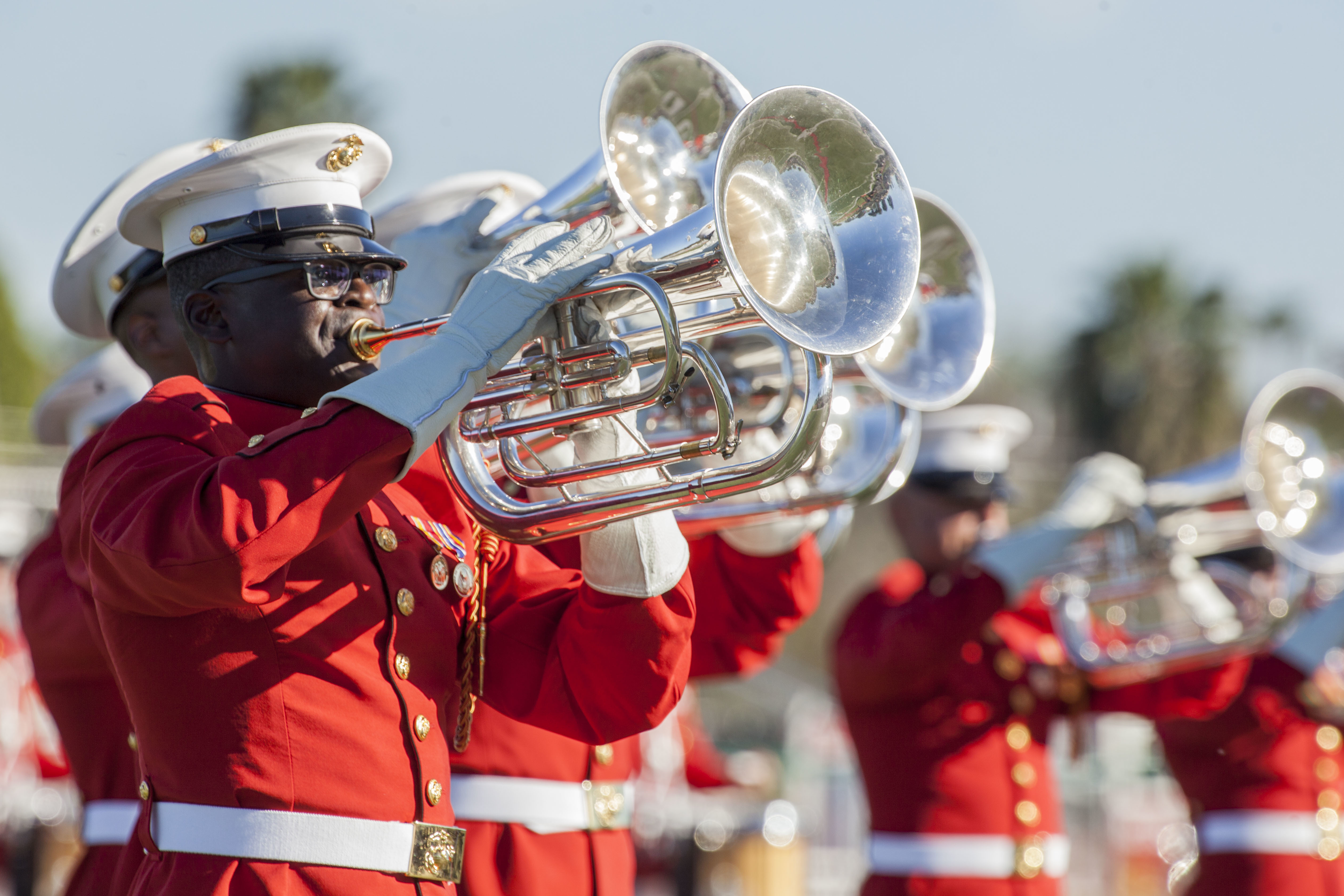
The United States Marine Drum and Bugle Corps.

Classic drum and bugle corps are musical ensembles that descended from military bugle and drum units returning from World War I and succeeding wars. Traditionally, drum and bugle corps served as signaling units as early as before the American Civil War, with these signaling units having descended in some fashion from ancient drum and fife corps. With the advent of the radio, bugle signaling units became obsolete and surplus equipment was sold to veteran organizations (such as the Veterans of Foreign Wars and American Legion, two major organizers for classic drum corps). These organizations formed drum and bugle corps of civilians and veterans, and the corps performed in community events and local celebrations. Over time, rivalries between corps emerged and the competitive drum and bugle corps circuit evolved.

The term "classic" is used for the purposes of this article to differentiate it from modern drum and bugle corps, using the time period of the establishment of Drum Corps International as a dividing point in the timeline of the two types of drum and bugle corps. Modern drum and bugle corps are a continuation of the classic variety, for all intents and purposes, having the same origins, though some corps in the "classic" model do still exist.

Traditionally, drum and bugle corps consisted of bell-front brass horns, field drums, a color guard, and an honor guard. Drum and bugle corps have often been mistaken for marching bands, since there is a similarity to both groups having horns and drums as well as the military influence on both; and they are both essentially bands of musicians that march. The activities are different in organization (marching bands usually associate with high schools and colleges while drum corps are freestanding organizations), competition and performance (marching bands perform in the fall at football games, drum corps usually compete during the summer), and instrumentation (drum corps use only brass bugles and drums, marching bands incorporate woodwinds and other alternative instruments).

== History ==
Within the mainland United States drum and bugle corps can trace their origins to the many Veterans of Foreign Wars ("VFW") and American Legion ("AL") meeting halls, where First World War and Spanish–American War veterans met and formed musical ensembles to entertain their communities, some of them being veterans of drum and bugle/field trumpet ensembles within the armed forces (Army, Marine Corps and Navy). The tradition of these military ensembles would later be adopted by civilian groups beginning in the 1880s, and no less than John Philip Sousa saw their potential, for these formations he wrote his first book, Trumpet and Drum, which included his own compositions for such formations. In addition to VFW- and AL-sponsored corps, other drum corps were founded by Boy Scouts of America troops (such as the corps that would become the modern-day corps: the Racine Scouts, The Cavaliers and the Madison Scouts), Elks lodges, YMCAs, the Catholic Youth Organization, Police Athletic Leagues (such as would found the Bluecoats), fire fighter organizations, and local businesses, as well as Churches, grammar schools, high schools and colleges. By far, Church-sponsored organizations predominated the drum corp circuits in the eastern coast states. In addition, the touring concerts of the drum and bugle band of the Queen's Own Rifles of Canada regiment of the Canadian Army Primary Reserve, which by then was among the pioneer bands of that type in North America, would also be an inspiration for the formation of early military and civil corps in the 1910s and 1920s, spurred on with the 1934 formation of what is now today the United States Marine Drum and Bugle Corps.

Rivalries between corps led to a shift towards competition and the AL and VFW both ran successful competition circuits through the late 1960s and early 1970s.

With improved national transportation trends by the 1960s, drum and bugle corps proliferated, both in the sheer numbers of both new and established corps across North America, in the many competitions held then, and in the stadium attendance counts.

At this time, however, there was unrest among some directors and instructors who were critical of the competition-rules committees of the veterans' organizations which governed and sanctioned state and national championship competitions.

The payment structure for shows was weighted so that the corps with the highest placement got the most prize money; corps who attended shows from great distances but placed poorly were at times left with financial losses, and some corps sought a fixed payment structure for all participating corps.

The second major reason was the desire by the some corps to have more control over their competitive performances. As an example, at the height of the Vietnam War a 1971 show by the Garfield Cadets drew criticisms from VFW organizers over a formation where the corps formed a large peace sign, which angered the staff of that corps over its loss of "artistic freedom". Both the Combine and Drum Corps International demanded that corps themselves should control rulemaking decisions.

The VFW and American Legion rules differed to a degree (although American Legion rules predominated in nearly every contest) and pressure increased to find a common judging system. Concerns were also voiced over contest promoters' rights in choosing sponsors and judges, and complaints arose regarding the lack of self-governance of competition circuits. The dissenters also expressed reservations about the increasing numbers of independent non-corps-sponsored competitions.

Some corps managers, directors and instructors walked out of the 1969 VFW national rules committee meeting after their requests for major rules changes were not approved, and some of the protesting participants then formed the by-invitation-only (and short-lived) Midwest Combine in 1971. In 1972, Drum Corps International was founded, and was designed to create one uniform, corps-governed competitive circuit for junior drum and bugle corps (members aged twenty-one or less). DCI formed its own rules-governing body and enacted membership fees causing further disparity between startup drum corps and more professional units. This milestone event marked the beginning of the modern drum corps era.

Most of the still-numerous North American competitive corps joined in the movement of change under new leadership, and by the mid-1970s the rapid introduction and proliferation into competitive drum and bugle corps of previously-unfamiliar innovations (on-field dancing, creative costuming, novelty effects and unusual instrumentation) effectively ended the Classic competitive era.

== Instrumentation ==
=== Bugles ===
With the widespread use of the 1892 Army field trumpet, which was actually a "straight" (valveless) bugle in the key of G, American drum & bugle corps evolved in that key. However, some members in some corps wished to add more notes to their brass repertoire. Some corps in the 1920s added D crooks on some horns in order to play more complicated songs in two lines, similar to a handbell ensemble. Ludwig added the first valve to a bugle to make the G-D horn-in-one, wisely making the valve horizontal rather than vertical in order to preserve the look and handling of the straight bugle (and to make it more difficult to spot by unobservant judges in circuits which had not yet legalized the valve). The single horizontal valve allowed the diatonic scale to be played by each bugle. While those of the Army sported tabards of their reporting units or commands, only several civil corps carried the tabards of their affiliated organization on their bugles.

The acceptance of the single-valved bugle took some time. Originally, the American Legion required that valved bugles have screws to allow the valve to be locked onto either the G or D open scale during certain competitions. Some smaller corps had straight bugles even into the 1960s, and there are still some corps, bands and other groups who continue to use straight bugles or G-D piston bugles to this day, as entire horn lines or as bugle sections.

In the late 1940s and early 1950s, inventive buglers across the country took to sanding one of the tuning slides so it could be used like a trombone slide. By the late 1950s and early 1960s, the slide was sometimes replaced with a half-tone rotary valve to F#, which allowed for nearly a full chromatic scale to be played. Some bass-baritones were equipped with full-tone rotary valves to F in order for some of the hornline to be able to achieve the desired Bugle Low A, and in the mid-1960s a bass-baritone rotor to E was briefly offered.

By 1967, the American Legion Uniformed Groups Rules Congress approved a mutual request by a number of instructors and managers to permit G-F-F# piston-rotor bugles in competition. This lighter bugle is able to achieve better intonation and a more complete chromatic scale than the G-D-F# bugles.

Slide-piston and/or rotor-piston bugles were common into the mid-1970s, and many non-competitive parade corps still existed that used straight bugles and single-valved models.

Manufacture of horizontal-piston bugles ceased in the 1990s, as most bugles were being sold to DCI drum corps, which legalized two-valved vertical piston instruments in 1977 and three-valved instruments in 1987.

The main advantages of horizontal-valved one-piston-with-slide and/or piston-rotor bugles include:

1. Ease of learning. The basic simplicity of the instrument allows for the possibility of rapid mastery by beginners
2. Substantially lower cost
3. Lightness
4. Ease of repair

Additions to drum and bugle corps voicings occurred in the mid-1930s with the popularity of the baritone bugle, pitched one octave below the soprano.

The tenor bugle also came into use at about this time, and although it was pitched in the soprano range, its slightly larger bore offered a darker, almost cornet-like and more robust tone. The tenor bugle fell from general favor by 1960 though they remained in bugle catalogs.

French horn bugles became popular by mid-century, serving as bridges between sopranos and baritones.

By 1950 a few bass-baritone bugles began to be seen. These larger euphonium-like instruments, pitched like the baritone one octave below the soprano and tenor, added a deep foundation. By 1960, the bass-baritones had largely supplanted the baritones in most corps.

One widely applauded and popular 1962 addition was the contrabass, the biggest horn and lowest voice, two octaves below the soprano, which partially rests on the shoulder.

The mellophone or mellophonium was introduced soon after, and was quickly popular for its capability of soaring above the rest of the bugle section. However it did not supplant the French horn, which remained the dominant middle voice.

Other less-popular bugle types introduced in the 1960 included herald trumpet bugles, euphoniums, pistonless slide sopranos and piccolo bugles or "angel bugles" pitched an octave above the sopranos. The valve-rotor bugle remained popular until the late 1970s, when rules changes moved toward two-valve upright bugles.

=== Drum lines ===
Classic corps drum lines of the 1950s and 1960s used fewer exotic percussion instruments and relied instead on the stadium-filling power of a traditional line (or "battery") consisting of six or eight 12-inch-deep (300 mm) by 15-inch-wide (380 mm) double-tension maple snare and tenor drum shells and two or occasionally three 26-inch-wide (660 mm) by 12-inch-deep (300 mm) bass drums with an ornamental shell covering of hard plastic in a glossy sparkle or pearlescent finish.

Until 1965, usually only one cymbalist was used in the field corps although two or even three cymbalists were not uncommon, especially on parade.

Until 1963, bass drummers used one stick or mallet and provided the foundation note in the battery. But in that year, drum instructors nationwide added two-stick rudimental bass-drumming to their drumlines, a historic style adopted from fife and drum corps. While rudimental bass drummers now had more to do, the one-stick bass drummers were often kept on as "foundation bass" or "straight bass" (also as standard bass) drummers. (In the 1930s and 1940s, those corps bass drummers using two mallets were termed as scotch bass drummers.)

Until 1965 single tenor drums were commonplace in some corps, the single tenor drum, beaten by 2 soft or hard mallets in the tradition of British corps of drums, served in the same role as the snare drums but without the snares below. The action of beating the mallets was following the British, Dutch or US Marine Corps practice, in which the tenor drummers played their drums as either flourishing tenors following British precedence or rhythm tenors similar to snares. The first multiple tenor drums appeared in 1966 and would be adopted by many corps in later years. A few corps even mounted glockenspiel in the vertical bell lyre form as part of their percussion unit.

The older-type, less-expensive and lighter single-tension drums, such as most corps used through the 1940s, were most often ordered for novice and feeder "cadet" corps.

Until 1956, drum heads were of stretched unborn calfskin, but beginning in 1957 the Ludwig Drum Company introduced mylar drum heads that gave a crisper sound and were impervious to damp weather.

The movement in classic corps is to drums which retain the Golden Age's unique sound.

== Color guard and Honor guard/drill team ==
The color guard and non-musical marching members in drum & bugle corps largely developed out of military honor guards. Over the years, some corps have included baton majors and majorettes — but largely, the auxiliary units have consisted of tall flag carriers (8' foot pikes), rifles (developed from military rifle drill teams) and saber squads.

The drum & bugle corps still maintains an honor squad, consisting of the corps' country's National Flag and "protectors", or "sidearms". Often, the honor squad will contain rifle or saber carriers, or carriers of sponsors/posts' flags and if needed, the honorary flags of the corps' past championships. Sometimes the "sidearm" member is just that — someone who sports a gun holster.

In the 1960s and prior, most color guards tended to be small, consisting of a few squads. As most big corps — again, with exceptions — were often all-male, many color guards were all-female in order to provide a marching opportunity for young women. There have, however, been many all-girl and all-male corps throughout drum and bugle corps' rich history, up to the present times. But prior to 1960, there were far more, which provided competitive opportunities for those corps who wished them, often without the touring requirements of today. And some units/areas of the country had mixed-gender corps going back decades.

In the modern era, now that gender is culturally less divisive and the requirements of corps memberships being military veterans (to a certain percentage) is uncommon, sections are much more rarely limited by gender. Mostly during the late 1960s, flag lines in particular mushroomed in size. During the days of execution drill, wherein yard lines on football fields were more rare and optional, the color guard often was an integral part of drill "dress" (positioning by sight, interval and direction).

Unlike the color guard, drill teams or honor guards in the DBCs of the 1960s were male-dominated, with mock rifles and sabres used.

== Drum majors ==
The field leader in drum & bugle corps is called a drum major. Some corps appoint more than one, but there is usually one designated chief drum major who leads the corps in both marching direction and musical direction. Traditional corps drum majors are effective showmen who command the corps in all venues. Early in the 20th Century, commands were usually issued either through a mace or baton, and/or with whistle signals. Eventually this evolved into vocal commands and manual signals, although military units still maintain the baton-signaling methods.

== Performance ==
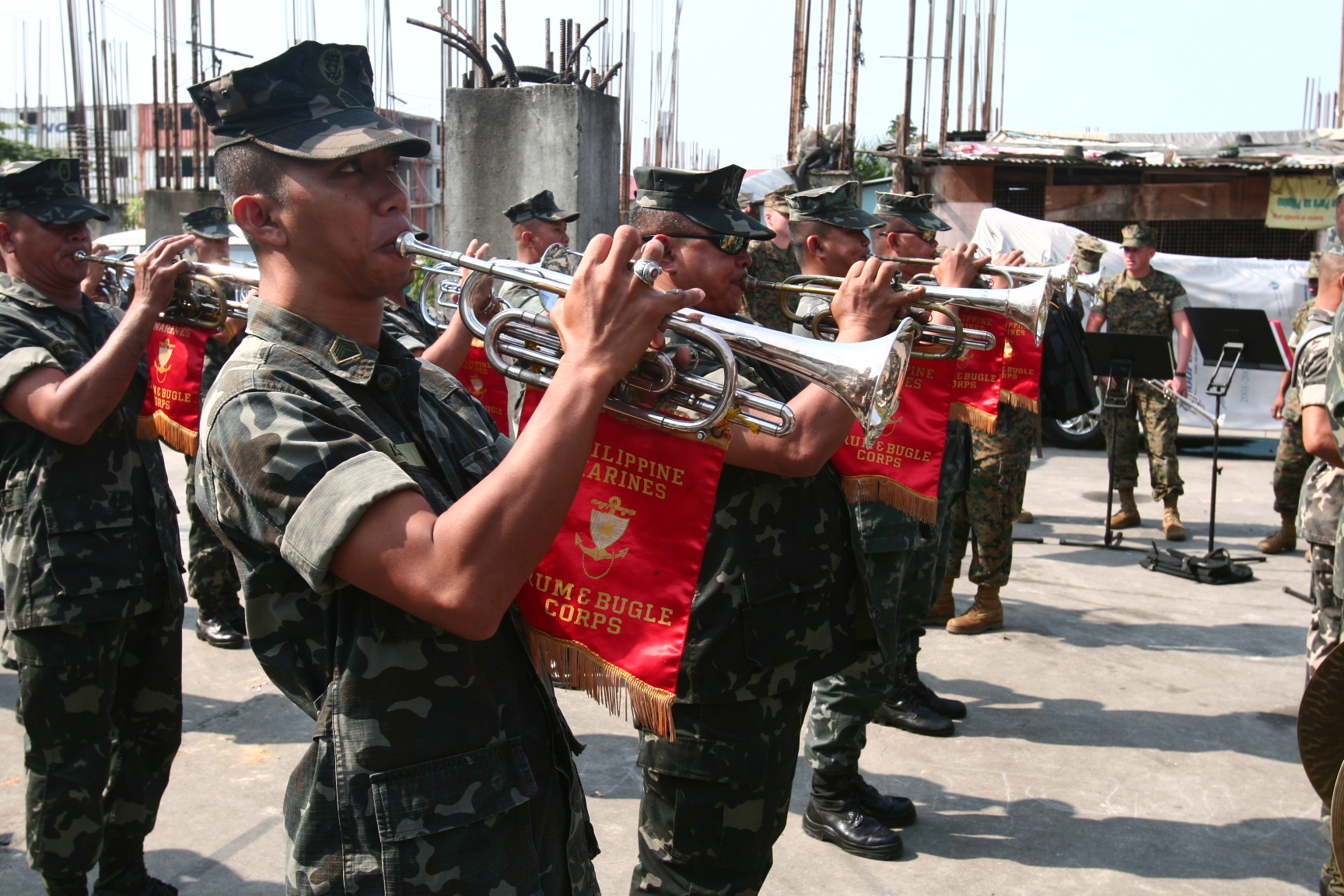
The Philippine Marine Corps Drum and Bugle Team (MDBT)

A drum and bugle corps performance consists of the playing of music, usually accompanied by marching on parade, in field-drill formation(s) or in a standstill performance. It is similar to that of a marching band, but more in line with military presentation and heritage. Further, perfection of execution is more traditional to drum & bugle corps. A marching band takes instruments which are used indoors and takes them outside in order to participate in outdoor ceremonies. A drum & bugle corps took outdoor instruments and remained outdoors, occasionally going inside for "standstill" concerts.

Drum and bugle corps is, traditionally, a musical activity which extended the camaraderie of combat to a musical "battle" on (football)-sized fields. The evolution and perceived "politics" of judging, however, has led most "classic" corps to move to exhibition-only performances which not only avoids judging preferences and politics but also cuts the costs of performing and of producing field presentations.

Until the 1960s, competitive shows traditionally began with an inspection — owing to the corps' military heritage — to ensure all on the field were qualified to compete, and that the uniforms and equipment were presentable according to standards. Scoring was done by circuit-approved judges which considered performance and overall effect in both music and movement.

Classic-era drum and bugle corps emphasized the stages of their presentations (beginning, middle and end) by their location on the field. A performance typically begins with the corps stepping "off the line" (the left goal line on a standard American football field).

The corps signals its readiness to the audience and judges by a drum major's salute. At the first step or note of music, the timekeeper will fire a timing pistol to designate the official start of post-inspection judging.(The timing pistol will be used again as an eleven-minute warning to designate the end of the minimum time permitted for the field performance.)

The corps might perform an "opening fanfare", followed by an "off the line" number which takes the corps to mid-field. The next traditional number is a "color presentation" or "color pre" (presenting the national flag according to the United States Flag Code). Following the presentation of the colors is an "into concert" or "park and Bark" piece which takes the corps into a concert formation (usually played standing still). Then, an "out of concert number" follows. There is the "exit" piece off the field — the opposite sideline, followed by the final fanfare, often but not always played at a standstill.

The corps then reconfigures into a single or double file and proceeds to "troop the stands" - marching from the audience's right to its left in columns close to the main grandstands while saluting, to the accompaniment of the drumline. Rarely, the bugles may offer an encore tune at this time.

The corps members then will be at liberty until the final corps is on the field, and then will again muster for the massed "retreat" ceremony at which all the participating corps re-enter the field simultaneously, each usually in its own parade formation as only one corps "plays them on".

As the music and motion halts, the field announcer summons the corps' commanding officers to center front, recognitions are made, and lastly the scores (if this was a judged contest) are announced. Each corps then marches off individually with its own music in order of placement, and the winning corps often remains, continuing to perform.

=== Example competition rules ===
The type of competitive rules drum and bugle corps used to compete under are exemplified by the following example from the All-American Judging Association:

Drum & Bugle Corps Rules — June 29, 1958

- A minimum drill of 11 minutes, a maximum 13 minutes.
- All judging will continue through entire performance.
1. Inspection. Condition of uniforms, equipment and general appearance as a military unit. All instruments used must be on the inspection line. Total penalty will be deducted from the General Effect score.
2. Musical quality of bugles or fifes...............25%
3. Excellence of drumming...........................25%
4. Marching and maneuvering (M&M)...................30%
5. General effect...................................20%
- A penalty of two points will be deducted from the total score for each minute or fraction thereof for over or under time on the field.
- If a member of the corps proper steps over the side boundary, a penalty of one point for each error will be assessed.
- A two-point penalty for any breach of the flag code.
- All competing drum and bugle corps must march in the parade and appear in the grand finale to qualify for competition and prizes.
- All-American judges will be in charge. No contestant or directors will be allowed to converse with judges while contest is going on. Please abide by this rule.
- Any unit not reporting within 15 minutes of their set inspection time shall be penalized two points; a unit not reporting within 30 minutes shall be penalized four points.
- Failure to report by any unit prior to the start of the inspection of the last competing group shall disqualify the unit.

== Break between "classic" and "modern" corps ==
To many, the late 1960s marked a high point in American drum corps activity and participation. Based on a meeting in 1970, a group of five corps of that era met to organize a by-invitation-only cooperative group that took on the working title of "The Combine".

The Combine's member corps all agreed to demand, starting in the 1971 competitive season, a fixed and predetermined appearance fee from contest sponsors where Combine corps would compete, rather than accept traditional prize money awards dependent on contest placements.

Contest audiences of 1971 also noticed that some Combine corps were attempting "Total Programs" - a phrase describing daring, controversial theme-based competitive innovations in costuming, marching and music that were clearly different and more radical than the then-standard norms.

From the Combine soon evolved the more structured, open-membership Drum Corps International (DCI). The first DCI National competition was held at Warhawk Stadium at Whitewater, Wisconsin in August 1972.

Beginning in the early 1970s, many corps chose to become members of DCI or DCA (the "modern" drum corps organizations), often driven by the withdrawal of support by their traditional veterans-group or church sponsors, although by this point in time the traditional sponsors were in many cases already withdrawing their support of the activity due to financial difficulties. The increased requirements of time and money to participate in DCI and DCA circuits proved prohibitive for many non-profit organizations with other primary missions. Groups without adequate funding did not survive. Many other groups chose not to move to the new style, citing tradition or principle. It was at this point that "classic" and "modern" drum and bugle corps became two very different activities.

Since the mid-1980s the classic drum corps movement has continued to grow with approximately forty such American corps currently active. Several of these corps incorporate the word "Alumni" into their name, though previous membership in a classic era corps is often not required. However, not all Alumni Corps or Senior Corps are classic corps; organizations such as the Bridgemen Alumni Corps and the Defenders Alumni Corps follow the modern corps style.

Most current classic corps are intended to serve as tributes and to remember the heritage of the Golden Age. Even so, they still are usually made up of people from a much larger area than the immediate city each represents.

The main Classic corps organization is the East-coast-based Great Alliance Seniors (GAS). Forsaking competitive judging, the GAS-affiliated corps meet to rehearse, socialize, and perform to parade, standstill and field-exhibition audiences.

== See also ==
- Drum and bugle corps (modern)
- Fanfare band
- Corps of drums
- Fife and drum corps
- Pipe band
