= Blue Stars Drum and Bugle Corps =

Junior drum and bugle corps based in La Crosse, Wisconsin

Blue Stars
- Location: La Crosse, WI
- Division: World Class
- Founded: 1964
- President: Kevin Hanson
- Director: Brad Harris
- Championship titles: CYO: 1973; VFW: 1977; DCI Open Class: 1989; 1993; 2001; 2003
- Website: www.bluestars.org

The Blue Stars Drum and Bugle Corps is a World Class competitive junior drum and bugle corps. Based in La Crosse, Wisconsin, the Blue Stars was one of the thirteen founding member corps of Drum Corps International.

== History ==
=== Formation and early years (1964–1982) ===
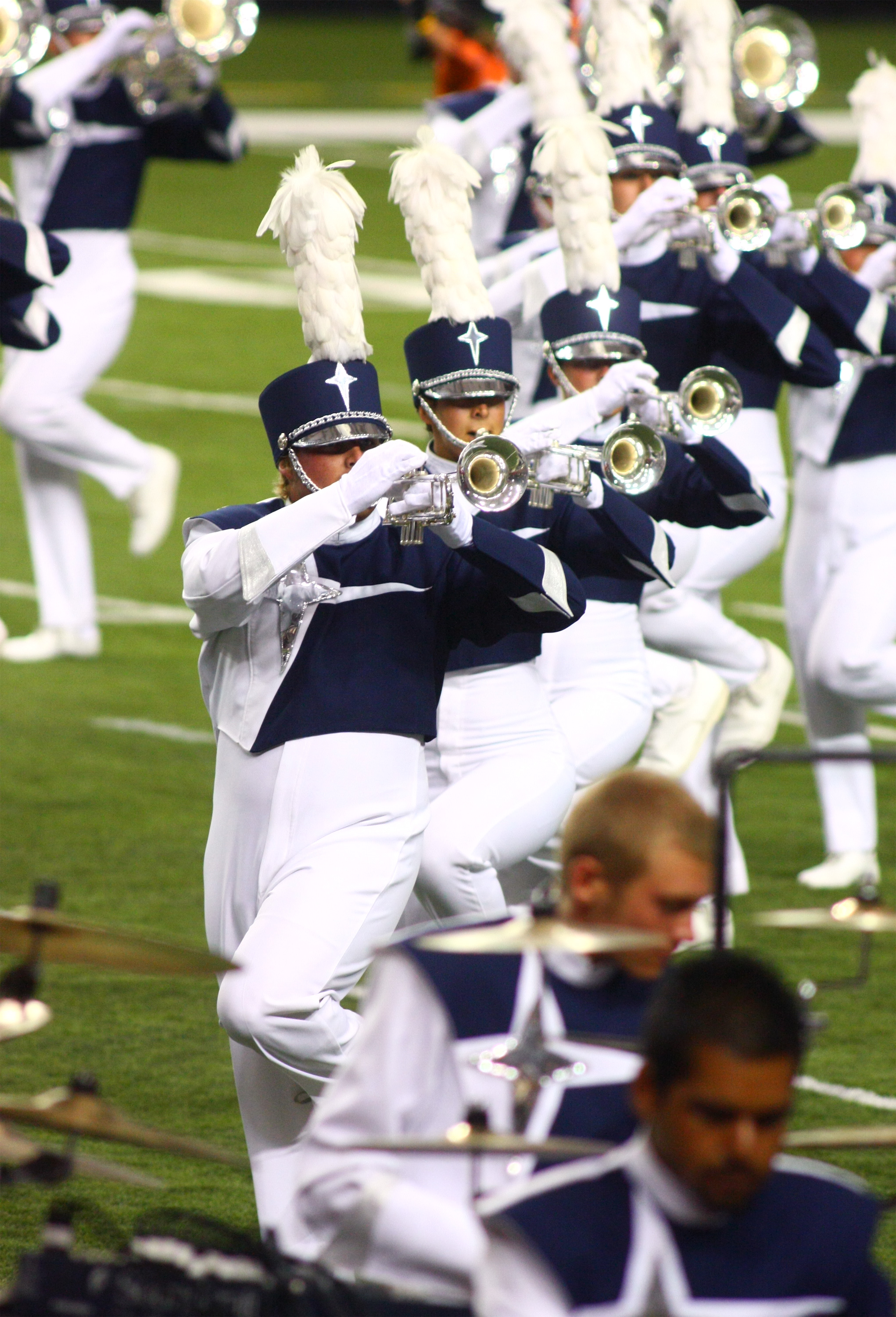
The Blue Stars, 2008

The Blue Stars Drum and Bugle Corps was founded in 1964 by Frank Van Voorhis and David Dummer. In its first year, there was only a color guard, but soon the color guard merged with the Apple Arrows Drum and Bugle Corps of La Crescent, Minnesota to become the Blue Stars. The Blue Stars took to the streets in 1965 as a competitive parade corps. They were sponsored by First Federal Savings and Loan and were known as the First Federal Blue Stars. In order to raise funds, First Federal issued stock in the corps and sold it to the citizens of La Crosse.

In 1966, the corps moved into field competition, and found immediate success, winning several competitions, including the Minnesota State American Legion Championships, before traveling to Washington, DC for the American Legion National Championships, where they finished 20th of 47 junior corps. The following year, the corps finished 10th of the 25 corps competing at the VFW Nationals in New Orleans. This commenced a streak that continued from 1966 through 1979, wherein the corps advanced to the finals of every major competition they entered. During this streak, the Blue Stars won the 1973 Catholic Youth Organization (CYO) Nationals and the 1977 VFW National Championships.

In 1971, at the urging of Cavaliers founder Don Warren and Troopers founder Jim Jones, the Blue Stars, Cavaliers, Madison Scouts, Santa Clara Vanguard, and the Troopers formed the Midwest Combine. This action was taken in reaction to the rigid, inflexible rules of the American Legion and VFW (the primary rule makers and sponsors of both corps and shows) and the low or nonexistent performance fees paid for appearing in the various competitions. The corps felt that not only were they having their creative potential as artistic performing groups stifled, but they were being financially starved. (A similar group of Eastern corps, the United Organization of Junior Corps (also known as the "Alliance"), was formed by the 27th Lancers, Garfield Cadets, Boston Crusaders, Blessed Sacrament Golden Knights, and Blue Rock.) The Combine members felt that the corps should be making their own rules, operating their own competitions and championships, and keeping the bulk of the money those shows earned. For the 1971 season, the corps stuck together, offering show promoters the five corps as a package. Despite pressure on show sponsors, judges, and other drum corps, the Combine corps were not only booked into a number of shows together, but they found a host for a show of their own, which was a spectacular success despite fears of failure that lasted until a standing-room-only crowd arrived literally at the last moment.

In 1972, the Blue Stars, along with the nine other corps from the Midwest Combine and the Alliance, plus the Anaheim Kingsmen, Argonne Rebels, and De La Salle Oaklands were founding members of Drum Corps International, which remains as the sanctioning body for junior corps in North America. At the first DCI World Championships in Whitewater, Wisconsin, the Blue Stars finished in second place in a competition that featured thirty-nine corps from the East, the South, the West Coast, the Midwest and Great Plains, and Canada. For DCI's first eight years, Blue Stars were an annual finalist. In 1980, the corps missed finals, finishing in 13th place and continued to decline for the next two years. The corps, no longer sponsored by First Federal and beset with heavy debt and declining membership, ceased operations after the 1982 season.

=== Rebuilding years (1982–2003) ===
Some alumni of the corps refused to see the Blue Stars die. Building a new organization, LBS Cadets, Inc., on the ashes of the old, they returned a corps the field in 1983, competing in the Cadet Corps International circuit under the name, Blue Star Cadets, because the original corps and the Blue Stars name were still encumbered with debt. In 1985, the Blue Star Cadets began competing in Class A60 in Drum Corps Midwest (DCM), which the original corps had helped found in 1978. In 1986, the Blue Star Cadets finished 7th of 20 corps in the DCI Class A60 prelims. Although the corps missed making DCI Finals, the new organization had paid off enough of the old one's debt to regain use of the name, Blue Stars. In the years after regaining its name, the Blue Stars became one of the most consistently competitive corps in Divisions II and III (now Open Class), never placing lower than 5th in its division. The corps won the Class A60 World Championship in 1989 and the renamed Division III World Championship titles in 1993, 2001, and 2003.

=== World Class return and growth (2003–present) ===
Disaster loomed in 2003, however, when the fundraising bingo operation suddenly began losing money. A plea to the drum corps public resulted in an influx of funds that saw the corps survive the season that culminated with its fourth DCI title—earned while going undefeated in competition. The reorganization resulting from the crisis directed more attention across the river from Wisconsin into Minnesota and out into the rest of the Midwest with the result that the corps doubled in size from 53 to over one hundred members and moved into Division II competition for 2004.

The Blue Stars 50th Anniversary banner, 2014.

With the move to Division II, the Blue Stars began planning for expansion to the then-maximum drum corps size of 135 members and a return to Division I competition. In 2004, the corps placed 5th in Division II, rose to 3rd place in 2005, and returned to Division I competition in 2006 for the first time since 1982. In 2006 and 2007, the corps finished in 14th place at the DCI Division I World Championship Finals. In 2007, the corps introduced a more contemporary uniform design, abandoning the cross-straps and buckle used for the majority of its existence, although their trademark helmet was retained until late in the 2008 season. In 2008, the Blue Stars qualified for World Class Championship Finals for the first time since 1979, and finished in 8th place each season from 2008 to 2010. The corps slipped to 11th place in 2011 and missed finals for a single season in 2012 when they placed 13th, before re-entering finals in 2013 placing 12th, and moving up to 9th place in 2014 for their 50th anniversary season. After placing 11th, 9th, and 10th respectively from 2015 to 2017, the corps again finished 8th in the 2018 and 2019 seasons. In 2020, the corps cancelled its season (along with the rest of DCI) due to the COVID-19 pandemic.

Building upon the Blue Stars' resurgence in the late 2000s and 2010s, the corps continued to make significant strides in the post-pandemic era. In 2021, Drum Corps International resumed operations with a non-competitive "Celebration Tour," allowing corps to perform without the pressures of scoring. The Blue Stars participated, marking their return to the field after the canceled 2020 season. The 2022 season was a milestone year for the Blue Stars. They achieved a 7th place finish at the DCI World Championship Finals for the first time since 1977 with a score of 92.775, a record high for the corps in World Class competition. In 2023, the corps faced challenges and placed 11th before rebounding and earning another 8th place finish in 2024 for their 60th anniversary season.

The Blue Stars Alumni Corps was started in 2005 and marches annually in the La Crosse Oktoberfest parade. In 2014, the alumni corps performed in exhibition at the corps' home show on July 12 to celebrate the corps' 50th anniversary. In 2024, the alumni corps once again performed in exhibition on July 7th to celebrate the corps' 60th anniversary.

== Show summary (1972–2026) ==
Key
Light blue background indicates DCI Open Class Finalist (Note: From 1986–1992, the Blue Stars competed in Class A60, and from 1992–2005 in Division II & III; these are the same tier and have since been renamed Open Class.)
Goldenrod background indicates DCI Open Class Champion
Pale green background indicates DCI World Class Semifinalist (Note: From 1972–1982, the Blue Stars competed in Open Class, from 2006–2007 in Division I, and have competed since 2008 in World Class. These are the same tier, just renamed.)
Pale blue background indicates DCI World Class Finalist

| Year | Repertoire | World Championships | |
| Year | Repertoire | Score | Placement |
|---|---|---|---|
| 1972 | Intermezzo (from First Suite in E-Flat) by Gustav Holst / First Federal March / Bridge Over Troubled Water by Paul Simon / Norwegian Wood by John Lennon & Paul McCartney / Scarborough Fair by Paul Simon / South Rampart Street Parade by Bob Haggart & Ray Bauduc / Green Leaves of Summer by Dimitri Tiomkin | 87.45 | 2nd Place; Open Class; Finalist |
| 1973 | Suite for Band by Gustav Holst / First Federal March / Battle Hymn of the Republic by William Steffe & Julia Ward Howe / Malaga by Bill Holman / South Rampart Street Parade by Bob Haggart & Ray Bauduc / El Cid by Miklos Rosza & Paul Francis Webster / Conquest (from Captain from Castile) by Alfred Newman | 85.50 | 3rd Place; Open Class; Finalist |
| 1974 | Tiger Rag by Nick LaRocca, Eddie Edwards, Henry Ragas, Tony Sbarbaro & Larry Shields / In the Mood by Wingy Manone, Joe Garland & Andy Razaf / El Cid by Miklos Rosza & Paul Francis Webster / Conquest (from Captain from Castile) by Alfred Newman / Hall of the Mountain King (from Peer Gynt Suite No. 1) by Edvard Greig / Light My Fire by Jim Morrison, Ray Manzarek, John Densmore & Robby Krieger | 75.70 | 12th Place; Open Class; Finalist |
| 1975 | Canzona by Peter Mennin / I've Been Searching So Long by James Pankow / Introduction by Terry Kath / The Ballad of Billy the Kid by Billy Joel / Soulero by Bob James & Richard Evans | 87.50 | 5th Place; Open Class; Finalist |
| 1976 | Theme from Jaws by John Williams / O Bless The Lord (from Godspell) by Stephen Schwartz / Echano (from Children of Sanchez) by Chuck Mangione / Malagueña by Ernesto Lecuona / S.W.A.T. by Barry De Vorzon / Bellavia (from Children of Sanchez) by Chuck Mangione / Soulero by Bob James & Richard Evans | 80.35 | 9th Place; Open Class; Finalist |
| 1977 | Wedding Dance by Joaques Press / Hatikvah (Israeli National Anthem) by Naftali Herz Imber & Shmuel Cohen / Hava Nagila (Traditional) / Selections from The Planets by Gustav Holst / Backwoods Sideman by John LaBarbera / If You Believe (from The Wiz) by Charlie Smalls / Soulero by Bob James & Richard Evans | 84.30 | 6th Place; Open Class; Finalist |
| 1978 | Malaga by Bill Holman / Suite for Jazz Flute and Piano by Claude Bolling / Hatikvah (Israeli National Anthem) by Naftali Herz Imber & Shmuel Cohen / Hava Nagila (Traditional) / Selections from The Planets by Gustav Holst / Backwoods Sideman by John LaBarbera / Come In From the Rain by Melissa Manchester & Carole Bayer Sager / España by Emmanuel Chabrier | 84.60 | 8th Place; Open Class; Finalist |
| 1979 | St. Louis Blues March by W. C. Handy, adapted by Glenn Miller / Birdland by Joe Zawinul / La Fiesta by Chick Corea / Strike Up the Band (from Strike Up the Band) by George Gershwin / Children of Sanchez by Chuck Mangione | 83.05 | 10th Place; Open Class; Finalist |
| 1980 | Pontieo by Edu Lobo & José Carlos Capinam / Go Back Home by Sam Falzone / La Fiesta by Chick Corea / Children's Dance (from Merry Mount Suite) by Howard Hanson / March (from First Suite in E-Flat) & Military Suite in F by Gustav Holst | 77.05 | 13th Place; Open Class |
| 1981 | Mathis der Mahler by Paul Hindemith / Country Road by James Taylor / Charter Jazz Suite by Bill Holcombe / Carnival (from La Fiesta Mexicana) by H. Owen Reed / April in Paris by Vernon Duke & E. Y. Harburg | 75.70 | 16th Place; Open Class |
| 1982 | Canzona by Peter Mennin / Celebration Suite by Chick Corea / Alexander's Ragtime Band by Irving Berlin / Image of Maria by Mark Slater / Tiger Rag by Nick LaRocca, Eddie Edwards, Henry Ragas, Tony Sbarbaro & Larry Shields | 53.10 | 37th Place; Open Class |
| 1983 | American Salute by Morton Gould / Suicide Is Painless (from M*A*S*H) by Johnny Mandel / Come In From the Rain by Melissa Manchester & Carole Bayer Sager | Did not attend World Championships | |
| 1984 | Come Follow the Band (from Barnum) by Cy Coleman / Moorside March by Gustav Holst / Rootbeer Rag by Billy Joel / Don't Get Around Much Anymore by Duke Ellington / Come In From the Rain by Melissa Manchester & Carole Bayer Sager | Did not attend World Championships | |
| 1985 | My Favorite Things (from The Sound of Music) by Richard Rodgers & Oscar Hammerstein II / Scenes From An Italian Restaurant by Billy Joel / Jeanine by Kenny Burrell / Strike Up the Band (from Strike Up the Band) by George Gershwin / In Your Eyes by George Benson / Soulero by Bob James & Richard Evans | Did not attend World Championships | |
| 1986 | My Favorite Things (from The Sound of Music) by Richard Rodgers & Oscar Hammerstein II / Day By Day & God Save the People (from Godspell) by Stephen Schwartz / I've Been Searching So Long by James Pankow / Soulero by Bob James & Richard Evans | 71.70 | 7th Place; Class A60; Finalist |
| 1987 | Rondo Capriccioso by Camille Saint-Saëns / Perpetual Rondo by Jean-Luc Ponty / At the End of the Day & I Dreamed a Dream (from Les Misérables) by Claude-Michel Schönberg, Alain Boublil, Jean-Marc Natel & Herbert Kretzmer / Soulero by Bob James & Richard Evans | 79.30 | 3rd Place; Class A60; Finalist |
| 1987 | Rondo Capriccioso by Camille Saint-Saëns / Perpetual Rondo by Jean-Luc Ponty / At the End of the Day & I Dreamed a Dream (from Les Misérables) by Claude-Michel Schönberg, Alain Boublil, Jean-Marc Natel & Herbert Kretzmer / Soulero by Bob James & Richard Evans | 55.30 | 24th Place; Open Class |
| 1988 | The Score / Don't Rain on My Parade (from Funny Girl) by Jule Styne & Bob Merrill / Selections from Les Misérables by Claude-Michel Schönberg, Alain Boublil, Jean-Marc Natel & Herbert Kretzmer | 75.10 | 3rd Place; Class A60; Finalist |
| 1989 | Carmina Burana by Carl Orff | 88.30 | 1st Place; Class A60; Champion |
| 1989 | Carmina Burana by Carl Orff | 65.00 | 17th Place; Open Class |
| 1990 | Rondo Capriccio by John Zdechlik / The Seventh Seal by Erik Nordgren | 81.60 | 5th Place; Class A60; Finalist |
| 1991 | For the Beauty of the Earth by Folliott Sandford Pierpoint / Praise Ye the Lord by John Rutter / Come Before Him by Dick Tunney & Melodie Tunney / Requiem Aeternam by John Rutter / Let There Be Praise by Dick Tunney & Melodie Tunney | 84.70 | 3rd Place; Class A60; Finalist |
| 1992 | Celebration of Music by John Rutter & GLAD; A Mighty Fortress by Martin Luther / Amen by Bob Kauflin / Praise Ye the Lord by John Rutter / The Great Storm is Over by Bob Kauflin / Tag | 82.40 | 8th Place; Division II & III; Finalist |
| 1993 | Selections from Candide; Westphalia Chorale; Battle Music; Oh, Happy We; What A Day; Make Our Garden Grow & Overture; All from Candide by Leonard Bernstein | 85.40 | 1st Place; Division III; Champion |
| 1994 | Pictures at an Exhibition; Promenade, Dance of the Unhatched Chickens, Hut of Baba-Yaga, Market Place at Limoges & The Great Gate of Kiev; All from Pictures at an Exhibition by Modest Mussorgsky | 91.80 | 2nd Place; Division III; Finalist |
| 1994 | Pictures at an Exhibition; Promenade, Dance of the Unhatched Chickens, Hut of Baba-Yaga, Market Place at Limoges & The Great Gate of Kiev; All from Pictures at an Exhibition by Modest Mussorgsky | 61.80 | 16th Place; Division I |
| 1995 | Dance Pieces; Armenian Dances by Alfred Reed / Liturgical Dances by David Holsinger | 85.40 | 5th Place; Division III; Finalist |
| 1996 | Appalachian Spring; Appalachian Spring by Aaron Copland | 87.80 | 3rd Place; Division III; Finalist |
| 1997 | Divine Comedy; Inferno, Paradise & Ascension; All from Symphony No. 1 (The Divine Comedy) by Robert W. Smith | 93.40 | 2nd Place; Division II; Finalist |
| 1997 | Divine Comedy; Inferno, Paradise & Ascension; All from Symphony No. 1 (The Divine Comedy) by Robert W. Smith | 67.20 | 26th Place; Division I |
| 1998 | The Trials of Spartacus; Spartacus Tone Poem by Jan Van der Roost / Love Theme (from Spartacus) by Aram Khachaturian / Symphony No. 3 by John Barnes Chance / War of the Elders (from Belkis, Regina di Saba) by Ottorino Respighi | 85.70 | 5th Place; Division III; Finalist |
| 1999 | Ivan the Terrible; Overture and Chorus, Song of the Fyodor Bazmanov, Uspensky's Cathedral, The Tartars, To Kazan, Humming Chorus & Dance of the Tsar's Men; All from Ivan the Terrible by Sergei Prokofiev | 92.20 | 2nd Place; Division III; Finalist |
| 1999 | Ivan the Terrible; Overture and Chorus, Song of the Fyodor Bazmanov, Uspensky's Cathedral, The Tartars, To Kazan, Humming Chorus & Dance of the Tsar's Men; All from Ivan the Terrible by Sergei Prokofiev | 70.20 | 26th Place; Division I |
| 2000 | Carmina Burana; Were diu werlt alle min; Tanz; In taberna quando sumus; Veni, veni, venias; In trutina; Ave formosissima & O Fortuna plango vulnera All from Carmina Burana by Carl Orff | 89.55 | 5th Place; Division II; Finalist |
| 2001 | The Legend of Alcobaca; Dom Pedro's Revenge (Mvt. 5), Ines (Mvt. 2) & Coronation of the Dead Queen (Mvt. 4); All from The Legend of Alcobaca by James Sochinski | 88.50 | 1st Place; Division III; Champion |
| 2002 | Three Decades; Jewish Fanfare and Chorale & Inferno (from Symphony No. 1 – The Divine Comedy) by Robert W. Smith / I Dreamed a Dream (from Les Misérables) by Claude-Michel Schönberg, Alain Boublil, Jean-Marc Natel & Herbert Kretzmer / Overture to Candide by Leonard Bernstein | 89.85 | 2nd Place; Division III; Finalist |
| 2003 | Visions of Blue; Gavorkna Fanfare & Chorale and Toccata by Jack Stamp / Follies (from Divertimento) by Roger Cichy / Lento (from Dance Movements) by Philip Sparke / Symphony for Brass and Percussion, Mvt. 3 by Alfred Reed | 88.60 | 1st Place; Division III; Champion |
| 2004 | Reloaded; Gundam Wing by Kow Otani / Tank by Yoko Kanno / The Legend of Ashitaka (from Princess Mononoke) by Joe Hisaishi | 91.500 | 5th Place; Division II & III; Finalist |
| 2005 | Pixelation: The Music of Final Fantasy; The Man With the Machine Gun, Liberi Fatali, Isn't It Beautiful? & Don't Be Afraid; All from Final Fantasy by Nobuo Uematsu | 93.925 | 3rd Place; Division II & III; Finalist |
| 2006 | The Gift of Freedom; Grover's Corner (from Our Town) by Aaron Copland / Simple Gifts by Elder Joseph Brackett / O Come Emmanuel (Traditional) / Liturgical Dances by David Holsinger / America The Beautiful by Samuel A. Ward | 81.525 | 14th Place; Division I Semifinalist |
| 2007 | Power and Grace; The Firebird Suite by Igor Stravinsky / Swan Lake by Pyotr Ilyich Tchaikovsky / The Swan (from The Carnival of the Animals) by Camille Saint-Saëns | 84.35 | 14th Place; Division I Semifinalist |
| 2008 | Le Tour: Every Second Counts; La Vie en Rose by Marguerite Monnot, Louis Guglielmi & Edith Piaf / Reverie by Claude Debussy / Toccata by Charles-Marie Widor / Pavane by Gabriel Faure / Pagodes, Prelude to the Afternoon of a Faun & Suite Bergamasque (Claire De Lune) by Claude Debussy / Symphony No. 3 by Camille Saint-Saëns / Gymnopédies, No. 1 by Erik Satie / The Girl with the Flaxen Hair by Claude Debussy / Pavane for a Dead Princess & Le Tombeau de Couperin by Maurice Ravel | 90.425 | 8th Place; World Class; Finalist |
| 2009 | The Factory; Hardin County (from Lincoln) by Alan Menken / The Factory by Frank Sullivan / Fancy Free by Leonard Bernstein | 90.05 | 8th Place; World Class; Finalist |
| 2010 | Houdini; Notes on A Scandal & Morning Passages (from The Hours), Primacy of Number (from Naqoyqatsi) & The Illusionist by Philip Glass / Trapped by Frank Sullivan / Tearing Herself Away (from The Hours) by Philip Glass / The Mountain (from The Bucket List) by Marc Shaiman / Nixon in China by John Adams | 91.90 | 8th Place; World Class; Finalist |
| 2011 | ReBourne; Main Titles (from The Bourne Identity) by John Powell / Burly Brawl (from The Matrix Reloaded) by Don Davis / Bourne Gets Well (from The Bourne Identity) by John Powell / Trinity Definitely (from The Matrix Revolutions) by Don Davis / Treadstone Assassins (from The Bourne Identity) by John Powell / Bullet Time (from The Matrix) by Don Davis | 86.20 | 11th Place; World Class; Finalist |
| 2012 | The Blue World; Fate Has Smiled Upon Us by Marc Streitenfeld / The Explorers (from Symphony No. 1: A Sea Symphony) by Ralph Vaughan Williams / Variations on Symphony No. 9 (New World Symphony) by Antonín Dvořák / Original Music by Tom Aungst & Frank Sullivan | 84.60 | 13th Place; World Class; Semifinalist |
| 2013 | Voodoo: I Put A Spell On You; Voodoo by Richard Saucedo, Ian Grom & John Mapes / I Put A Spell On You by Screamin' Jay Hawkins / At Last by Harry Warren & Mack Gordon / One Speed by Graeme Revell | 85.45 | 12th Place; World Class; Finalist |
| 2014 | Where the Heart Is; The Chairman Dances by John Adams / Homeward Bound by Paul Simon / Home by Drew Pearson & Greg Holden / To Build a Home by Jason Swinscoe, Patrick Watson & Phil France (The Cinematic Orchestra) / Original Music by Richard Saucedo, Ian Grom & John Mapes | 89.600 | 9th Place; World Class; Finalist |
| 2015 | Side Show; Entrance of the Gladiators by Julius Fucik / The Daring Young Man on the Flying Trapeze by Gaston Lyle & George Leybourne / I Will Never Leave You (from Side Show) by Henry Krieger & Bill Russell / Send in the Clowns (from A Little Night Music) by Stephen Sondheim / Carnivale by Jeff Beal / Original Music by Richard Saucedo, Ian Grom & John Mapes | 85.150 | 11th Place; World Class; Finalist |
| 2016 | Le Rêve; Overture by Benoit Jutras / Chapel by Benoit Jutras / Tristan und Isolde by Richard Wagner / The Dream Finale by Richard Saucedo, Ian Grom & John Mapes | 89.050 | 9th Place; World Class; Finalist |
| 2017 | Star Crossed; Romeo and Juliet by Sergei Prokofiev / Kissing You by Des'ree Weeks (aka Des'ree) & Tim Atack / Number One Crush by Butch Vig, Shirley Manson, Doug Erikson & Steve Marker (Garbage) / Young and Beautiful by Rick Nowels & Elizabeth Grant (aka Lana Del Rey) / Nature Boy by eden ahbez / Lady Marmalade by Bob Crewe & Kenny Nolan / Diamonds Are a Girl's Best Friend by Jule Styne & Leo Robin | 87.398 | 10th Place; World Class; Finalist |
| 2018 | The Once and Future Carpenter; We've Only Just Begun by Paul Williams & Roger Nichols / Skyscrapers by John Alden Carpenter / Precious Metals by Thomas Newman / (They Long To Be) Close to You by Burt Bacharach & Hal David / Rainy Days and Mondays & I Won't Last A Day Without You by Paul Williams & Roger Nichols | 90.050 | 8th Place; World Class; Finalist |
| 2019 | Call of the Wild; Concerto No. 4 in F Minor, Op. 8, RV 297 (Winter) by Antonio Vivaldi / Symphony No. 1 by Pyotr Ilyich Tchaikovsky / Dance Panels by Aaron Copland / Sora by Yoko Kanno / Avalanche by Jim Wunderlich, Rick Barclay & Matthew Hernandez / The Great Thaw (Vuelie Reprise) by Frode Fjellheim & Christophe Beck | 91.225 | 8th Place; World Class; Finalist |
| 2020 | Season cancelled due to the COVID-19 pandemic | | |
| 2021 | @ The Top of the World; In the Heights, No Me Diga, Piragua, Breathe, Everything I Know, The Club, Blackout & Finale; All from In the Heights by Lin-Manuel Miranda | No scored competitions | |
| 2022 | Of War & Peace; War and Peace Symphonic Suite & Ballad of an Unknown Boy by Sergei Prokofiev / Variations for Oboe and Military Band by Nikolai Rimsky-Korsakov / No One Else by Dave Malloy / Confrontation on Eadu (from Rogue One) by Michael Giacchino / Dust and Ashes by Dave Malloy | 92.775 | 7th Place; World Class; Finalist |
| 2023 | In Absintheia; Avrio by Everfish / Green by Michael Torke / Let Me Drown by Orville Peck / Such Letting Go Is Love by The Symbion Project & Mellissa R. Kaplan / In Absintheia by Jim Wunderlich | 88.625 | 11th Place; World Class; Finalist |
| 2024 | Universal; The Harmony Codex by Steven Wilson / Inner Universe by Yoko Kanno / Oremus and Adoratio by Juris Karlsons / Nocturne by Tomas Kaco / Stardust by Hogay Carmichael / All the Stars by Kendrick Lamar, Mark Spears, Al Shuckburgh, Solána Rowe & Anthony Tiffith / Saturn by Solána Rowe, Carter Lang, Rob Bisel, Jared Solomon & Scott Zhang / I Remember (Death in the Afternoon) by Warren Cann, Chris Cross, Billy Currie & Midge Ure / Yellow by Chris Martin, Jonny Buckland, Guy Berryman & Will Champion | 91.600 | 8th Place; World Class; Finalist |
| 2025 | Spectator Sport; An Outdoor Overture by Aaron Copland / The Winner Takes It All by ABBA / The Distance by Cake / Team by Lorde | 91.175 | 8th Place; World Class; Finalist |
| 2026 | Collection ‘26 : The Galleries; Color and Light by Stephen Sondheim / Selections from LUX by Rosalía / La Chancla by Dennis Llinas / Vincent by Don McLean / Pictures at an Exhibition by Modest Mussorgsky / Overture (from Le Rêve) by Benoît Jutras / Move On by Stephen Sondheim | 94.137 | 6th Place; World Class; Finalist |
