= Impulse Drum and Bugle Corps =

Open Class competitive junior drum and bugle corps

- Impulse Drum and Bugle Corps logo
- Location: Buena Park, California
- Division: Open Class
- Founded: 1998
- Director: Peter Connell
- Championship titles: DCI Open Class; 2006
- Website: www.impulseyoutharts.org

The Impulse Drum and Bugle Corps is an Open Class competitive junior drum and bugle corps. Based in Buena Park, California, Impulse performs in Drum Corps International (DCI) competitions. Impulse was the 2006 DCI Division III World Champion. It operates under the organization "iYao" (Impulse Youth Arts Organization) which was established in 1998.

== History ==
Impulse Youth Arts Organization (iYao) was founded in Buena Park, California in the fall of 1998 with the intent of developing a culture that maintains character and accountability, teaching corps members to accommodate changes for innovation, and perfecting musical performance. The design goal of Impulse was to create a style that follows in the tradition of the Velvet Knights Drum and Bugle Corps from Anaheim, California and the Bridgemen Drum and Bugle Corps from Bayonne, New Jersey.

During its inaugural season, Impulse competed at seven competitions within California, placing 2nd at the DCI Pacific Championships in San Jose, California. In 2000, the corps expanded its tour to thirteen competitions throughout the Pacific Northwest. Impulse concluded with a 2nd-place finish at Drums Along the Rockies in Denver, Colorado. In 2001, the corps mounted its first national tour to attend the DCI World Championship Prelims in Buffalo, New York and earned 9th place in Division II.

In 2006, Impulse moved to Division III and won the DCI Division III World Championship Title in Madison, Wisconsin, sweeping every caption. In 2007, the DCI World Championships were hosted for the first time in Pasadena, California. Impulse placed 6th in Division lll finals. Since 2008, Impulse has exclusively toured the west coast to maintain its commitment of uninterrupted financial stability and providing a high level drum and bugle corps experience to its local performers. In 2016, Impulse travelled to DCI Open Division Championships in Indianapolis, Indiana.

In 2022, Impulse re-emerged with a fresh vision that has since taken the organization to new heights. Impulse has had much success in reawakening the corps spirit through the last 4 seasons since 2022, growing the corps membership to over 100+ members in 2025. Impulse also saw its highest score in over a decade through the 2025 season.

== Sponsorship ==
The Impulse Drum and Bugle Corps is an Impulse Youth Arts Organization performance ensemble. Bob Briggs is the President of the board of directors and executive director. Peter Connell is the Corps Director

== Show summary (1999–2026) ==
Key
Light blue background indicates DCI Open Class Finalist (Note: From 2001–2007, Impulse competed in Division II and Division III; and since 2008, they have competed in Open Class. These are the same tier, just renamed.)
Goldenrod background indicates DCI Open Class Champion

| Year | Repertoire | World Championships | |
| Year | Repertoire | Score | Placement |
|---|---|---|---|
| 1999 | Kool Vibes; Good Vibrations by Brian Wilson & Mike Love / The Contender by Bill Ungerman, Daniel Glass, Eddie Nichols & Mick Farren (Royal Crown Revue) / I Want You Back by Berry Gordy, Freddie Perren, Alphonzo Mizell & Deke Richards / I'll Be There by Berry Gordy, Bob West, Hal Davis & Willie Hutch | Did not attend World Championships | |
| 2000 | Music 101; I've Got the Music in Me by Bias Boshell / Jesu, Joy of Man's Desiring by Johann Sebastian Bach / Too Much Time on My Hands by Tommy Shaw / Help by Lennon–McCartney / Dragnet Theme (Danger Ahead and Dragnet March) by Miklós Rózsa & Walter Schumann / Rockin' the Paradise by Dennis DeYoung, Tommy Shaw & James "J.Y." Young | Did not attend World Championships | |
| 2001 | Island Extravaganza; Theme from Gilligan's Island by Sherwood Schwartz & George Wyle / Bali Hai (from South Pacific) by Richard Rodgers & Oscar Hammerstein II / Hawaiian Wedding Song by Charles E. King / Volcano Music by Tex Avery / Hawaiian War Chat by Prince Leleiohoku | 82.150 | 9th Place; Division II |
| 2002 | Hey Lucy! We're Home; I Love Lucy Theme by Eliot Daniel / Cuban Pete by José Norman / Just Kidding by Michel Camilo / Pagliacci by Ruggero Leoncavallo | 81.050 | 12th Place; Division II & III |
| 2003 | Pure Imagination; Pure Imagination, Candy Man, I've got a Golden Ticket, Oompa Loompa, and Cheer Up Charlie; All from Willy Wonka and the Chocolate Factory by Leslie Bricusse & Anthony Newley | 84.800 | 8th Place; Division II & III; Finalist |
| 2004 | Cartoon; Cartoon by Paul Hart / Powerhouse by Raymond Scott | 89.050 | 6th Place; Division II & III; Finalist |
| 2005 | The Impulsables; Glory Days, Off to Work, 1000 Mile Dash, and the Incredits; All from The Incredibles by Michael Giacchino | 90.900 | 6th Place; Division II & III; Finalist |
| 2006 | Me, Myself and I Selections from Charlie and the Chocolate Factory by Danny Elfman | 84.975 | 1st Place; Division II & III; Champion |
| 2007 | Shichi; Music from Final Fantasy by Nobuo Uematsu | 78.850 | 6th Place; Division II & III; Finalist |
| 2008 | The Game; Three Worlds by John Meehan | 77.300 | 18th Place; Open Class |
| 2009 | A New American Classic; Morning, Noon and Night in Vienna Overture by Franz von Suppé / Morning Mood (from the Peer Gynt Suite No. 1) by Edvard Grieg / Anvil Chorus (from Il Trovatore) by Giuseppe Verdi / Dance of the Comedians (from The Bartered Bride) by Bedřich Smetana / Blue Danube Waltz by Johann Strauss II / Poet and Peasant Overture by Franz von Suppé | Did not attend World Championships | |
| 2010 | United; America the Beautiful by Samuel A. Ward & Katharine Lee Bates / Beyond the Breaking Tides by Christian Earl / Songs of Earth, Water, Fire and Sky by Robert W. Smith / Amber Waves by Morton Gould / The Red Pony & Fanfare for the Common Man by Aaron Copland | Did not attend World Championships | |
| 2011 | Tribute; Third Symphony, Fourth Mvt. by Vittorio Giannini / Variations on a Korean Folk Song by John Barnes Chance / Corral Nocturne & Hoe-Down (from Rodeo), The Red Pony & Fanfare for the Common Man by Aaron Copland | Did not attend World Championships | |
| 2012 | Overture! American Overture by Joseph Willcox Jenkins / Cuban Overture by George Gershwin / 1712 Overture by P. D. Q. Bach (Peter Schickele) | Did not attend World Championships | |
| 2013 | Crystal Celebration; Outdoor Overture by Aaron Copland / Powerhouse by Raymond Scott / Dance of the Hours (from La Gioconda) by Amilcare Ponchielli | Did not attend World Championships | |
| 2014 | Dusk to Dawn; Symphony No. 5 / Moonlight Sonata / Ode to Joy from Symphony No. 9 All by Ludwig van Beethoven | Did not attend World Championships | |
| 2015 | Interpolation; Anna's Theme, The Monastery, Gregorian Chant & The Gypsies; All from The Red Violin by John Corigliano | Did not attend World Championships | |
| 2016 | Music is ___; Beautiful Dreamer by Stephen Collins Foster / Symphony No. 25 in G Minor (K-183) - Allegro con brio by Wolfgang Amadeus Mozart / Firebird Suite by Igor Stravinsky / Great Gate of Kiev by Modest Mussorgsky | 61.575 | 14th Place; Open Class |
| 2016 | Music is ___; Beautiful Dreamer by Stephen Collins Foster / Symphony No. 25 in G Minor (K-183) - Allegro con brio by Wolfgang Amadeus Mozart / Firebird Suite by Igor Stravinsky / Great Gate of Kiev by Modest Mussorgsky | 60.063 | 36th Place; World Class |
| 2017 | In the Beginning; Also Sprach Zarathustra by Richard Strauss / Rite Of Spring by Igor Stravinsky / Adagio (from Spartacus) by Aram Khachaturian / Piano Concerto No. 2 by Poul Ruders / Ritual Fire Dance by Manuel de Falla | 58.125 | 15th Place; Open Class |
| 2017 | In the Beginning; Also Sprach Zarathustra by Richard Strauss / Rite Of Spring by Igor Stravinsky / Adagio (from Spartacus) by Aram Khachaturian / Piano Concerto No. 2 by Poul Ruders / Ritual Fire Dance by Manuel de Falla | 57.550 | 39th Place; World Class |
| 2018 | Time After Time; Primacy of Number by Philip Glass / Time After Time by Cyndi Lauper & Rob Hyman / Time Is Running Out by Matt Bellamy, Chris Wolstenholme & Dominic Howard (Muse) | Did not attend World Championships | |
| 2019 | The Greatest Hero; Incredits 2 (from Incredibles 2) & Homecoming Suite (from Spider-Man: Homecoming); All by Michael Giacchino | Did not attend World Championships | |
| 2020 | Season canceled due to the COVID-19 pandemic | | |
| 2021 | Opted out of competition for the season | | |
| 2022 | Anew; The Jetsons (Main Theme) by Joseph Barbera, William Hanna & Hoyt Curtin / New World Symphony by Antonín Dvořák / Dear Theodosia (from Hamilton) by Lin-Manuel Miranda / Assassin's Creed Theme (from Assassin's Creed: Revelations) by Lorne Balfe | Did not attend World Championships | |
| 2023 | Maverick; Darkstar by Harold Faltermeyer & Lorne Balfe / You're Where You Belong by Hans Zimmer, Michael Tucker & Stefani Germanotta / I Ain't Woried by Ryan Tedder, Brent Kutzle, Tyler Spry, Peter Morén, Björn Yttling & John Eriksson (OneRepublic) / The Man, The Legend by Hans Zimmer, Harold Faltermeyer, Michael Tucker & Stefani Germanotta / Hold My Hand by Michael Tucker & Stefani Germanotta | Did not attend World Championships | |
| 2024 | That New York Feeling; Empire State of Mind by Shawn Carter (Jay-Z) & Alicia Keys / New York, New York by John Kander & Fred Ebb / Welcome to New York by Taylor Swift & Ryan Tedder / In the Heights by Lin-Manuel Miranda / Selections from Spider-Man: Across the Spider-Verse by Leland Tyler Wayne (Metro Boomin) | Did not attend World Championships | |
| 2025 | LOOK UP; The Dark Knight by Hans Zimmer / Romantic Flight (from How To Train Your Dragon) by John Powell / Focus Hiccup (from How To Train Your Dragon) by John Powell / Married Life (from Up) by Michael Giacchino / End Credits (from How To Train Your Dragon) by John Powell | Did not attend World Championships | |
| 2026 | Around the Table; Uno by Peter Connell / Breathe (from In the Heights) by Lin-Manuel Miranda / Sorry by Justin Bieber, Michael Tucker, Sonny Moore, Justin Tranter & Julia Michaels / I Could Use a Boost (from The Wild Robot) by Kris Bowers | Did not attend World Championships | |
