= The Cadets Drum and Bugle Corps =

Defunct junior drum and bugle corps

The Cadets
- Location: Garfield, New Jersey (1934–2002); Allentown, Pennsylvania (2003–2022); Erie, Pennsylvania (2023–2024)
- Division: World Class
- Founded: 1934; 92 years ago
- Folded: April 2, 2024; 2 years ago
- Director: Brian Murphy
- Championship titles: American Legion: 1940; 1948; 1949; 1950; 1953; 1957; 1960; 1961; 1962; 1964; CYO: 1984; DCI: 1983; 1984; 1985; 1987; 1990; 1993; 1998; 2000; 2005; 2011

The Cadets Drum and Bugle Corps (formerly the Holy Name Cadets, Cadets of Garfield, Garfield Cadets, and Cadets of Bergen County) was a junior drum and bugle corps that operated from 1934 to 2024.

Most recently based in Erie, Pennsylvania, the group was among the thirteen founding corps of Drum Corps International (DCI). It was a ten-time DCI World Champion in the World Class division and was the oldest continuously active junior drum and bugle corps in North America.

On April 2, 2024, The Cadets filed for Chapter 7 bankruptcy, citing the costs of defending a 2020 sexual abuse lawsuit and an inability to get liability insurance coverage.

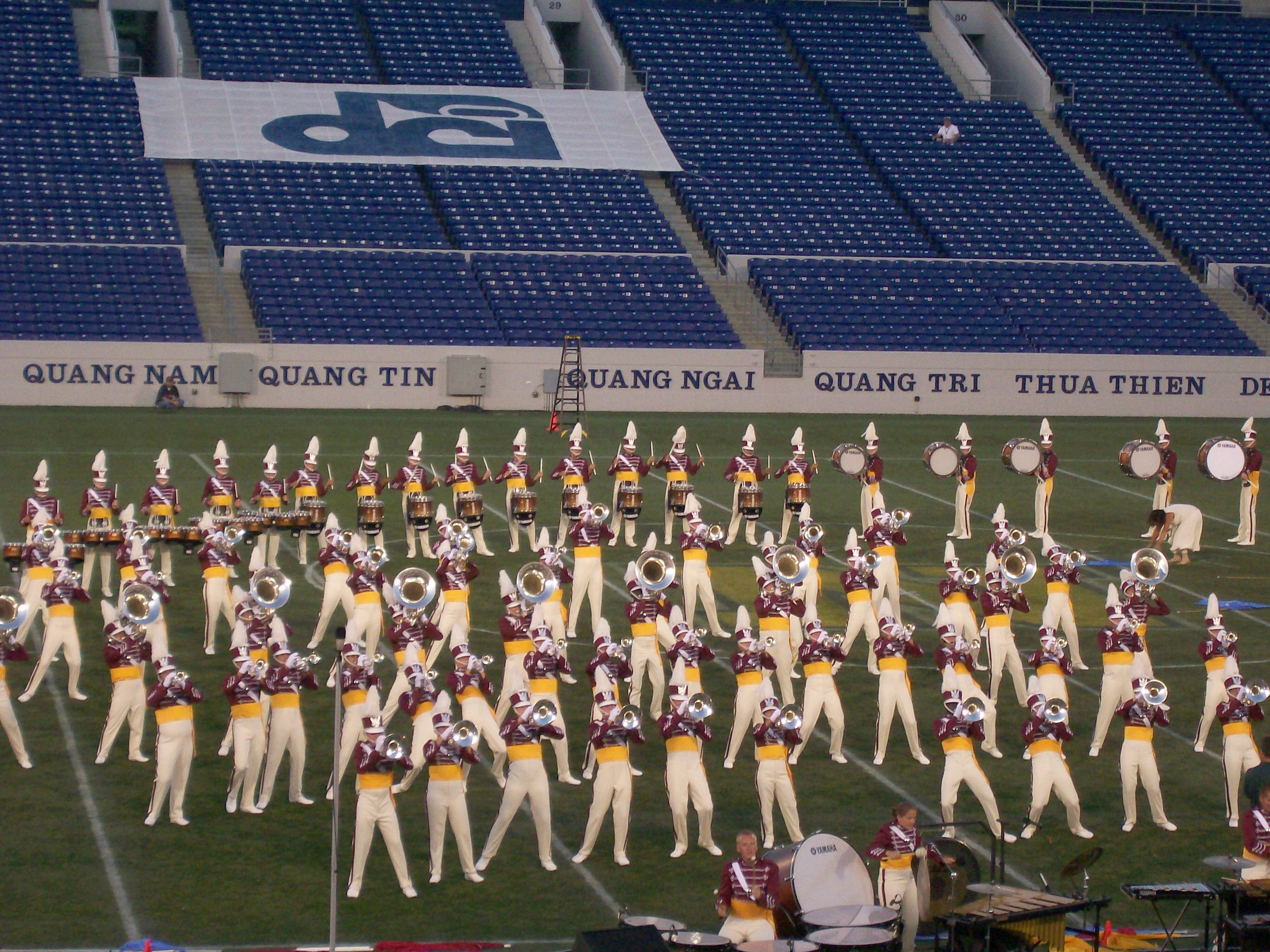
The Cadets in 2007

== History ==
In 1934, Charles Mura, Michael Koeph, and the Rev. Edwin Garrity of the Holy Name Catholic parish in Garfield, New Jersey founded the Holy Name Cadets Drum and Bugle Corps as an activity for the boys in the parish. The corps quickly became one of the top competitive corps in the country. In 1937, the song, "O Holy Name", was written for the corps. The lyrics were taught to new members each summer and sung to the tune of "O Tannenbaum".

In 1940, the Cadets won the American Legion Junior National Championship in Boston, the first of a record nine Legion titles the corps would win between 1940 and 1964. The corps was known not only for its talent but for its traveling to compete. In 1950, the Cadets went on the road for three weeks in order to defend their Legion title in Los Angeles.

In 1958, the Holy Name parish declined to support the corps' travel and disbanded the corps. The members and staff, however, were not willing to cease the corps operations, and reorganized as a new organization, even though the parish kept the uniforms and instruments. The corps traveled to Chicago for Legion Nationals at the members' own expense. Marching as the Cadets of Garfield; wearing uniforms of white shorts, red golf shirts, and "Aussie" hats; and using instruments borrowed from the Chicago Cavaliers, the corps managed to finish in second place (one spot ahead of the defending champion Cavaliers). Midway through the 1959 season, the parish allowed the corps to once more wear the uniform that remains their trademark.

In the second half of the Sixties, the Garfield Cadets became more of an also-ran than a champion. In 1969, the corps became coed. In 1971, the Cadets marched a show they called, "No More War"; at VFW Nationals in Dallas. They reportedly tried to convince the VFW officials that the peace symbol in their drill was actually the Mercedes-Benz logo. Also in 1971, the Garfield Cadets, along with the 27th Lancers, Boston Crusaders, Blessed Sacrament Golden Knights, and Blue Rock, formed the United Organization of Junior Corps (also known as the "Alliance"). This action was taken in reaction to the rigid, inflexible rules of the American Legion and VFW (the primary rule makers and sponsors of both corps and shows) and the low or nonexistent performance fees paid for appearing in the various competitions. The corps felt that not only were they having their creative potential as artistic performing groups stifled, but they were being financially starved. (A similar group of Midwestern corps, the Midwest Combine, was formed by the Blue Stars, Cavaliers, Madison Scouts, Santa Clara Vanguard, and the Troopers.) The Alliance members felt that the corps should be making their own rules, operating their own competitions and championships, and keeping the bulk of the money those shows earned. For the 1971 season, the corps stuck together, offering show promoters the five corps as a package. Despite pressure on show sponsors, judges, and other drum corps, the corps were booked into a number of shows together.

In 1972, the Garfield Cadets, along with the nine other corps from the Alliance and the Midwest Combine, plus the Anaheim Kingsmen, Argonne Rebels, and De La Salle Oaklands were founding members of Drum Corps International, which remains as the sanctioning body for junior corps in North America. At the first DCI World Championships in Whitewater, Wisconsin, the Cadets just missed making Finals and finished in thirteenth place in a competition that featured thirty-nine corps from the East, the South, the West Coast, the Midwest and Great Plains, and Canada. The corps would fail to make DCI Finals for the first three years they were held and for six of DCI's first eight seasons. After their third Finals appearance in 1980, the Cadets quickly regained the corps' former championship form. In 1983–1985, the Garfield Cadets became the first DCI corps to earn a three-peat—three consecutive DCI titles. On July 4, 1986 the Cadets performed as a part of the Liberty Weekend celebrating both the hundredth anniversary and the restoration of the Statue of Liberty. In 1987, the corps won its fourth DCI crown in five years.

The Garfield Cadets relocated outside Garfield to Hackensack and became the Cadets of Bergen County in 1989. The Cadets of Bergen County won DCI Championships in 1990, '93, '98, and 2000. In 1996, sponsorship of the corps was passed to Youth Education in the Arts (YEA), an umbrella organization sponsoring several youth and musical activities. Also in '96, the Cadets performed at the Summer Olympics in Atlanta. In 1999, the corps rebranded once again, dropping any reference to locale from its name and becoming simply The Cadets. In 2003, YEA! moved its base of operations to Allentown, Pennsylvania and The Cadets relocated along with it. In January 2009, The Cadets marched in President Barack Obama's Inaugural Parade in Washington, D.C. The Cadets won additional DCI championships in 2005 and 2011, the corps' ninth and tenth in forty seasons.

To honor their 75th anniversary, the corps was called the Holy Name Cadets for the 2009 season. The only junior drum and bugle corps older than The Cadets was the Racine Scouts, which was founded in 1927. The Scouts, however, have not competed on the field since 2015, making The Cadets the oldest continuously active junior corps briefly until becoming inactive prior to the 2024 season. Currently the oldest continuously active junior corps is the Madison Scouts Drum and Bugle Corps, which has been active since 1938. The Govenaires, an all-age corps founded in 1927, retain the title of oldest continuously active corps.

=== 2018 sexual misconduct allegations ===
On April 5, 2018, allegations were made in published reports that the longstanding corps director, George Hopkins, sexually harassed or abused multiple members of the corps and staff over a period of years. Later that day, Hopkins stepped down as director of the Cadets and as YEA! CEO while denying the allegations. Sean King was named as interim CEO for YEA! On April 11, the board of directors tendered its resignation and a new board and officers immediately took over operations of the organization. Claiming to have received no letter of resignation, the new board terminated Hopkins for cause. In his federal lawsuit seeking severance pay and other monies, Hopkins asserted that he resigned from the organization by letter on April 5, and that his departure was "mutually agreed"-upon. The organization also hired a Chicago labor and employment law firm, Franczek Radelet, to investigate the accusations against Hopkins as well as YEA!’s policies and procedures for providing a safe environment for youth members, employees, and volunteers. In addition, YEA! established a hotline for calls to report concerns or complaints.

The YEA! organization was immediately put on a probationary status by DCI with the statement that multiple steps would be needed for the corps to participate in the 2018 season. As a part of the terms of probation, the corps reassessed their planned travel to the West Coast to open the season and instead decided to proceed with a schedule redrawn for East Coast shows. The corps' compliance with the terms of probation was sufficient for DCI to allow the Cadets to compete in 2018, and the probation was lifted in May 2019.

On November 13, Hopkins was indicted in Lehigh County, Pennsylvania for sexual assault, based on accusations of two women who were former employees of YEA. The charges were second-degree felonies. Hopkins surrendered to authorities, was arraigned, and was released on $50,000 bail with a preliminary hearing scheduled for December 4. On September 22, 2020, Hopkins pleaded no contest to indecent assault and was sentenced to two years probation and fined $5,000.

In response to Hopkins suing YEA! for more than $650,000 in severance and back pay, the organization filed a counter-suit against the former director for $1.5 million in losses which it alleged were sustained due to the sexual misconduct scandal. The alleged damages included lost sponsorships and pledged donations to the Cadets and YEA!, a major loss of participants in the US Bands program, as well as legal fees incurred due to the scandal. Hopkins and YEA! reached a settlement in January 2019.

== Organizational ties ==
The Cadets was formerly part of Youth Education in the Arts (YEA!), a nonprofit 501(c)(3) organization. In addition to The Cadets, YEA! also sponsored the recently inactive 2016 DCA Champion Cadets2 Drum Corps, 2014 WGI Independent Open Champion Cadets Winter Percussion, and Cadets Winter Guard; USBands (formerly United States Scholastic Band Association); the Urban Arts Center of the Lehigh Valley, which included the Xcape Dance Studio.

The Cadets began operating independently of YEA! as of March 31, 2020. On May 1, 2020, The Cadets announced the creation of a new 501(c)3 non-profit organization: Cadets Arts & Entertainment, Inc. (CAE). A new board of directors was established, led by former CEO and Cadets Director Denise Bonfiglio.

"For 86 years, The Cadets have been leaders and innovators in performing arts education," Bonfiglio said. "We are now opening a new chapter in the storied history of The Cadets by creating a 501(c)(3) nonprofit entity guided by the following founding principles: To educate youth from around the globe on the value of teamwork, inclusiveness, kindness, self-expression, and open communication; To create a safe and inclusive environment for all participants; and To enrich lives by teaching critical development skills required for the pursuit of personal excellence."

In 2022, The Cadets entered into a partnership with the Erie Sports Center as the new spring training site for the corps' May-June rehearsals. The City of Erie welcomed The Cadets with open arms, offering access to local business relationships, services, volunteers, and new opportunities for funding and partnerships. In February 2023, CAE announced a long-term partnership with the Erie Sports Center, resulting in a decision to move The Cadets and all operations of CAE to Erie, Pa. The CAE Board of Directors approved this decision on Monday evening, February 13, 2023. Vicki Ferrence Ray, Interim Executive Director of CAE, subsequently signed an agreement to make the Erie Sports Center The Cadets' year-round home.

== Show summary (1972–2023) ==
Key
Pale blue background indicates DCI World Class Finalist (Note: From 1972 to 1991, the Cadets competed in Open Class; from 1992 to 2007 in Division I, and since 2008 in World Class. These are the same tier, just renamed.)
Dark gold background indicates DCI World Class Champion

Year	Repertoire	World Championships	
Year	Repertoire	Score	Placement
1972	Mars (from The Planets) by Gustav Holst / Rule, Britannia! by Thomas Arne & James Thomson / The Sinfonians by Clifton Williams / Yankee Doodle by Richard Shuckburgh / Greensleeves (Traditional) / Children's Dance (from Merry Mount) by Howard Hanson / Amazing Grace by William Walker & John Newton / Jupiter (from The Planets) by Gustav Holst / Fanfare, Chorale & Finale by Gustav Mahler / A Mighty Fortress is Our God by Martin Luther	78.45	13th Place; Open Class
1973	The Sinfonians by Clifton Williams / Give it One by Maynard Ferguson & Alan Downey / A Mighty Fortress is Our God by Martin Luther / Procession of Bacchus (from Sylvia) by Jean Sibelius	72.00	17th Place; Open Class
1974	The Sea Hawk by Erich Wolfgang Korngold / One Tin Soldier by Dennis Lambert & Brian Potter / Parade of the Toy Soldiers by Pyotr Ilyich Tchaikovsky / In the Mood by Wingy Manone, Joe Garland & Andy Razaf / Lullaby of Broadway by Harry Warren & Al Dubin / Avenue C by Buck Clayton / Alexander's Ragtime Band by Irving Berlin / Alabama Jubilee by George L. Cobb & Jack Yellen / Sunshine On My Shoulders by John Denver, Dick Kniss & Mike Taylor	75.15	19th Place; Open Class
1975	Hall of the Mountain King by Edvard Grieg / Fanfare for the Common Man & Lincoln Portrait by Aaron Copland / Anything Goes by Cole Porter / Avenue C by Buck Clayton / In the Mood by Wingy Manone, Joe Garland & Andy Razaf / Tiger Rag by Nick LaRocca, Eddie Edwards, Henry Ragas, Tony Sbarbaro & Larry Shields / Alexander's Ragtime Band by Irving Berlin / What Are You Doing the Rest of Your Life? (from The Happy Ending) by Michel Legrand, Alan Bergman & Marilyn Bergman / Romeo and Juliet by Pyotr Ilyich Tchaikovsky	80.55	11th Place; Open Class; Finalist
1976	Prelude, Act 3 (from Lohengrin) by Richard Wagner / Pieces of Dreams by Michel Legrand, Alan Bergman & Marilyn Bergman / Echano (from Children of Sanchez) by Chuck Mangione / The Elks' Parade by Bobby Sherwood / This is My Country by Al Jacobs & Don Raye / Yankee Doodle by Richard Shuckburgh	82.45	14th Place; Open Class
1977	Rite of Spring by Igor Stravinsky / Primal Scream by Jay Chattaway & Maynard Ferguson / Theme to Star Trek by Alexander Courage / Pieces of Dreams by Michel Legrand, Alan Bergman & Marilyn Bergman / Echano (from Children of Sanchez) by Chuck Mangione / I Don't Know How to Love Him (from Jesus Christ Superstar) by Andrew Lloyd Webber & Tim Rice	78.15	13th Place; Open Class; Finalist
1978	Advance of the Sponges by HIGGINS / Left Bank Express by Pete Jackson / Pieces of Dreams by Michel Legrand, Alan Bergman & Marilyn Bergman / Echano (from Children of Sanchez) by Chuck Mangione / Strawberry Soup by Don Ellis / I Don't Know How to Love Him (from Jesus Christ Superstar) by Andrew Lloyd Webber & Tim Rice	79.05	14th Place; Open Class
1979	Carmina Burana by Carl Orff / Chump Change by Bill Cosby & Quincy Jones / Children of Sanchez & Echano by Chuck Mangione / I Don't Know How to Love Him (from Jesus Christ Superstar) by Andrew Lloyd Webber & Tim Rice	76.75	16th Place; Open Class
1980	One Voice by Barry Manilow / Evening Concert by Bill Conti / Fernando's Fantasy by Tom Scott / Fire Dance by Jeff Tkazyik & Allen Vizzutti / The Elks' Parade by Bobby Sherwood / Through the Eyes of Love by Marvin Hamlisch & Carole Bayer Sager	76.45	10th Place; Open Class; Finalist
1981	Adventures in Time by Johnny Richards / Egyptian Danza by Al Di Meola / Fire Dance by Jeff Tkazyik & Allen Vizzutti / The Elks' Parade by Bobby Sherwood/ Pieces of Dreams by Michel Legrand, Alan Bergman & Marilyn Bergman	89.40	7th Place; Open Class; Finalist
1982	Piano Concerto in F by George Gershwin / Rocky Point Holiday by Ron Nelson / Cuban Overture by George Gershwin	92.25	3rd Place; Open Class; Finalist
1983	Rocky Point Holiday by Ron Nelson / In Nomine Patris; Almighty Father; Sanctus; Agnus Dei; God Said; De Profundis, Part 2 & A Simple Song (all from Mass) by Leonard Bernstein	94.40	1st Place; Open Class; Champion
1984	Maria, Rumble, Prologue, America, I Have a Love & Quintet; All from West Side Story by Leonard Bernstein & Stephen Sondheim	98.00	1st Place; Open Class; Champion
1985	Symphony No. 1 (Jeremiah Symphony), Overture & Make Our Garden Grow (from Candide); All by Leonard Bernstein	98.40	1st Place; Open Class; Champion
1986	On the Waterfront by Leonard Bernstein / Christopher Street (from Wonderful Town) by Leonard Bernstein, Betty Comden & Adolph Green	95.60	4th Place; Open Class; Finalist
1987	Appalachian Spring; Appalachian Spring by Aaron Copland	97.90	1st Place; Open Class; Champion
1988	Third Symphony; Third Symphony by Aaron Copland	96.10	4th Place; Open Class; Finalist
1989	Les Misérables; I Dreamed A Dream, At the End of the Day, Look Down, On My Own, Attack on Rue Plumet, Bring Him Home, One Day More & At the Barricades; All from Les Misérables by Claude-Michel Schönberg, Alain Boublil, Jean-Marc Natel & Herbert Kretzmer	95.60	5th Place; Open Class; Finalist
1990	A Bernstein Celebration; Overture to Candide & Mass by Leonard Bernstein / Somewhere (from West Side Story) by Leonard Bernstein & Stephen Sondheim / Fancy Free Ballet by Leonard Bernstein	97.70	1st Place; Open Class; Champion
1991	ABC's of Modern American Music; Short Ride in a Fast Machine by John Adams / Letter From Home by Aaron Copland / Prelude, Fugue & Riffs by Leonard Bernstein	93.70	6th Place; Open Class; Finalist
1992	To Tame the Perilous Skies; To Tame the Perilous Skies by David Holsinger	97.00	2nd Place; Division I Finalist
1993	In the Spring, At the Time When Kings Go Off to War; In the Spring, When Kings Go Off to War; Ballet Sacra & On a Hymnsong of Philip Bliss; All by David Holsinger	97.40	1st Place; Division I Champion
1994	West Side Story; Dance at the Gym, Mambo, Cha-cha, Cool, Prologue/Rumble, A Boy Like That, Tonight & Finale; All from West Side Story by Leonard Bernstein & Stephen Sondheim	97.70	2nd Place; Division I Finalist
1995	An American Quintet; The Reivers; Born on the 4th of July; Blowing Off Steam (from Far and Away); Swing, Swing, Swing (from 1941) & Land Race (from Far and Away); All by John Williams	97.20	2nd Place; Division I Finalist
1996	The American West; The Promise of Living (from The Tender Land) by Aaron Copland / Tulsa: A Portrait in Oil by Don Gillis / Gunfight (from Billy the Kid), Hoedown (from Rodeo) & Happy Ending (from The Red Pony) by Aaron Copland	96.90	3rd Place; Division I Finalist
1997	Celebration; Celebration & Year of the Dragon by Philip Sparke	97.60	2nd Place; Division I Finalist
1998	Stonehenge; Stonehenge & Canterbury Chorale by Jan Van der Roost	98.40	1st Place; Division I Champion
1999	The Big Apple; The Big Apple (Symphony No. 2) by Johan de Meij / Theme from City of Angels by Gabriel Yared	96.40	4th Place; Division I Finalist
2000	We are the Future; Tapestry Of Nations, Prologue, Chaos and Meaning, The Sage of Time & The Promise; All from Millennium Celebration by Gavin Greenaway	97.65	1st Place; Division I Champion (Tie) (Note: In 2000, the Cadets and the Cavaliers tied for 1st place.)
2001	Juxtaperformance; Young Person's Guide to the Orchestra by Benjamin Britten / Moondance by Van Morrison / Vide Cor Meum (from Hannibal) by Dante Alighieri & Patrick Cassidy / Farandole by Georges Bizet	97.60	2nd Place; Division I Finalist (Tie) (Note: In 2001, the Cadets and the Blue Devils tied for 2nd place.)
2002	An American Revival; Times Square (from On the Town) by Leonard Bernstein, Betty Comden & Adolph Green / The Place Where Dreams Come True (from Field of Dreams) by James Horner / Boogie Woogie Bugle Boy by Don Raye & Hughie Prince / New York Memories by Don Hill / America the Beautiful by Samuel A. Ward & Katharine Lee Bates	96.75	3rd Place; Division I Finalist
2003	Our Favorite Things; Fanfare and Allegro by Clifton Williams / Malagueña by Ernesto Lecuona / Rocky Point Holiday by Ron Nelson	97.10	3rd Place; Division I Finalist
2004	Living With the Past; Aqualung by Ian Anderson & Jennie Anderson / Living in the Past & Thick as a Brick by Ian Anderson / Bourrée in E minor by Johann Sebastian Bach / Locomotive Breath, Songs from the Wood, Mother Goose & Cross-Eyed Mary from Aqualung by Ian Anderson	95.60	4th Place; Division I Finalist
2005	The Zone: Dreamscapes in Four Parts with a Door; Twisted Nerve by Bernard Herrmann / Liquid by Jay Bocook / Overture to a New World & Cvalda (from Dancer in the Dark) by Björk / Vertigo by Bernard Herrmann / False Mirrors by Jay Bocook	99.15	1st Place; Division I Champion
2006	Volume 2: Through the Looking Glass; History Repeating by Alex Gifford / White Rabbit by Grace Slick / Pollock by Jeff Beal / Original Music by Jay Bocook, Tom Aungst & Neil Larrivee / Sanvean: I am Your Shadow by Lisa Gerrard & Andrew Claxton / Diaspora Dances (from Concerto for Orchestra) by Leonard Bernstein	93.075	5th Place; Division I Finalist
2007	This I Believe: Truth, Value, and the Personal Experience Called Drum Corps; Symphonic Movement by Václav Nelhýbel / Blue Shades by Frank Ticheli / Adiemus II - Cantata Mundi by Karl Jenkins	97.025	2nd Place; Division I Finalist
2008	...and the pursuit of happiness Appalachian Spring by Aaron Copland / An American Elegy & Nitro by Frank Ticheli / Round Four by Frank Sullivan / Vesuvius & Apollo Unleashed by Frank Ticheli	94.75	5th Place; World Class; Finalist
2009	West Side Story 2009: Conflict and Resolution; Rumble, Prologue, A Boy Like That/I Have A Love, Cool & Tonight; All from West Side Story by Leonard Bernstein & Stephen Sondheim	97.20	3rd Place; World Class; Finalist
2010	Toy SOULdier; Procession of the Nobles by Nikolai Rimsky-Korsakov / Overture (from The School for Scandal) by Samuel Barber / Prelude to Act II, Maypole Dances & Children's Dance (from Merry Mount) by Howard Hanson / Dance of the Tumblers by Nikolai Rimsky-Korsakov / March of the Toys (from Babes in Toyland) by Victor Herbert	95.10	5th Place; World Class; Finalist
2011	Between Angels and Demons; Angels in the Architecture by Frank Ticheli / 160 BPM (from Angels & Demons) by Hans Zimmer / Doxology by Loys Bourgeois & Thomas Ken / Amazing Grace by William Walker & John Newton	98.35	1st Place; World Class; Champion
2012	12.25; Carol of the Bells by Mykola Leontovych & Peter Wilhousky / Jingle Bells by James Lord Pierpont / Do You Hear What I Hear? by Gloria Shayne Baker & Noël Regney / O Tannenbaum by Ernst Anschütz / Hark! The Herald Angels Sing by Felix Mendelssohn, William H. Cummings & Charles Wesley	95.05	4th Place; World Class; Finalist
2013	Side >< Side: The Music of Samuel Barber; Symphony No. 1, Adagio for Strings & Medea's Dance of Vengeance; All by Samuel Barber	96.95	3rd Place; World Class; Finalist
2014	Promise: An American Portrait; The Promise of Living (from The Tender Land); Lincoln Portrait; Music for the Theater, Mvts. 1, 2 & 4; Grover's Corner (from Our Town) & Appalachian Spring; All by Aaron Copland	96.875	3rd Place; World Class; Finalist
2015	The Power of 10; Symphony No. 10 in E Minor, Op. 93 (Mvts. II, III, & IV) by Dmitri Shostakovich / Diane and Camilla (from Mulholland Drive) by Angelo Badalamenti / Original Music by Jay Bocook	95.900	4th Place; World Class; Finalist
2016	Awakening; The Pines of the Appian Way & The Pines of Villa Borghese by Ottorino Respighi / Turning, Lightning Field & Wine Dark Sea by John Mackey	92.763	6th Place; World Class; Finalist
2017	The Faithful, The Fallen, The Forgiven; Devotions: Kyrie Eleison, Simple Song, De Profundis, Agnus Dei, Things Get Broken, Pax: Communion, and Offeratory; All from Mass by Leonard Bernstein	91.675	7th Place; World Class; Finalist
2018	The Unity Project; O Holy Name (Traditional) / Opening Scene by Drew Shanefield, Tom Aungst, and Omar Carmenates / Sound of Silence by Simon & Garfunkel / Sensemaya by Silvestre Revueltas / Misterioso by Drew Shanefield / Demonic Thesis by John Psathas / Ara Batur by Sigur Rós / Ballet Sacra by David Holsinger	92.225	7th Place; World Class; Finalist
2019	Behold; Fanfare for the Women by Libby Larsen / Just by David Lang / Blueprint by Caroline Shaw / Dance 1 (from Estancia) by Alberto Ginestera / Bridge Over Troubled Water by Paul Simon / Do Better by Tom Aungst, Omar Carmenates & Brandon Carrita / Symphony No. 4 (Finale) by David Maslanka	89.838	9th Place; World Class; Finalist
2020	Season cancelled due to the COVID-19 pandemic		
2021	...Shall Always Be; Everything Old Is New Again by Peter Allen / Appalachian Spring by Aaron Copland / Rocky Point Holiday by Ron Nelson / New World (from Dancer in the Dark) by Björk / Moondance by Van Morrison / The Land Race (from Far and Away) by John Williams	No scored competitions	
2022	Rearview Mirror; Adrenaline City by Adam Gorb / St. Louis Blues by W.C. Handy / Theme from To Kill a Mockingbird by Elmer Bernstein / American Gothic: III. Pitchfork by Michael Daugherty	92.913	6th Place; World Class; Finalist
2023	Atlas Rising; What Are You Going To Do When You Are Not Saving The World (from Man of Steel) by Hans Zimmer / Immortal by Paul Lovatt-Cooper / Defeat by Lee Beddis & Andrew Monteiro / Corynorhinus (from Batman Begins) by Hans Zimmer	94.313	5th Place; World Class; Finalist

== Caption awards ==
At the annual World Championship Finals, Drum Corps International (DCI) presents awards to the corps with the high average scores from prelims, semifinals, and finals in five captions. The Cadets have won these caption awards:

Don Angelica Best General Effect Award

- 2000, 2005, 2011

John Brazale Best Visual Performance Award

- 2005, 2011

George Zingali Best Color Guard Performance Award

- 2005

Jim Ott Best Brass Performance Award

- 2000, 2005, 2015

Fred Sanford Best Percussion Performance Award

- 2001, 2002, 2003, 2005, 2013

Prior to 2000 and the adoption of the current scoring format, the Cadets won these captions:

High General Effect Award

- 1983, 1984, 1985, 1990 (tie), 1992, 1993, 1997, 1998

High Visual Award

- 1983, 1984 (tie), 1987 (tie), 1990 (tie), 1993, 1998

High Color Guard Award

- 1989, 1991, 1993, 1994, 1996

High Brass Award

- 1983, 1984 (3-way tie), 1985 (tie), 1987 (tie), 1995 (3-way tie)

High Percussion Award

- 1987, 1990
