= Anaheim Kingsmen Drum and Bugle Corps =

Competitive junior drum and bugle corps

Anaheim Kingsmen
- Location: Anaheim, California
- Division: Open Class
- Founded: 1958
- Disbanded: 1991
- Championship titles: CYO- 1972; DCI- 1972

The Anaheim Kingsmen Drum and Bugle Corps, commonly referred to as the Anaheim Kingsmen, were a competitive junior drum and bugle corps. Based in Anaheim, California, the corps was a charter member corps of Drum Corps International (DCI) and the first DCI World Champion.

== History ==
The Kingsmen had their origins in the Anaheim Explorer Scouts Drum and Bugle Corps, founded by Don Porter in 1958. Practicing on military installations, the corps and its members adopted a very military style, even when out of uniform. In 1963, the Explorer Scouts corps split into two new corps: the Kingsmen and the Velvet Knights.

By the late 1960s the corps, nicknamed "The Blue Machine" was touring nationally and became a contender for major national titles in the early '70s. The corps at this time was financially sound, having a strong parents' support group and corporate sponsorships from Disneyland, Knott's Berry Farm, and the Anaheim Angels baseball team. In late 1971, the Kingsmen became a founding member of the Drum Corps International. However, 1972 got off to a rocky start, when founder Don Porter suddenly resigned as director. With rumors of the corps' demise spreading around the country, the corps reorganized under interim directors Don Wells and Don Linscott. Starting late, the corps spent six weeks of hard work to put their show together before departing on their national tour. The corps won both the U.S. Open in Marion, Ohio and the CYO Nationals in Boston before arriving in Whitewater, Wisconsin for the inaugural DCI World Championships. The Kingsmen placed third in the preliminary competition, behind Santa Clara Vanguard and Blue Stars, but vaulted past both corps in Finals to win the first-ever DCI title.

The Kingsmen were very successful in 1972, with a score of 88.15, the highest score at the time in the finals. The team arrived a day late to the finals in 1973 and performed the same arrangement, earning a 13 point penalty as a result. This, combined with the expense of staying at a motel before Finals and the loss of Don Porter's financial abilities put the corps into financial distress. They continued to challenge in DCI for only two more years, finishing 6th in 1973, and 3rd in 1974, before the corps went inactive in 1975 to try to reorganize its finances. After their return to the field in 1976, the Kingsmen were no longer a contender, touring and attending DCI for only three years before again going inactive, this time for four years. The corps returned to DCI competition from 1982 to 1986, but never placed higher than 28th. The corps then restricted itself to local West Coast performances in Class A60, with some success, but, after losing their drum line to another corps and their fully loaded equipment trailer to thieves, the Kingsmen left the field after the 1988 season.

The Kingsmen organization relocated to Stanton in 1989 and reorganized their bingo operation, which continued to raise money for the group for at least another dozen years. They purchased a building in Garden Grove for use as a corps hall. The Kingsmen continued to sponsor percussion ensembles and winter guards for competition in Winter Guard International during the 1990s.

The Kingsmen Alumni Corps returned the Kingsmen name to the field in 2007, making several appearances, including a performance at the DCI Semifinals at the Rose Bowl in Pasadena on August 10.

== Show summary (1972–1988) ==
Key
Light blue background indicates DCI Open Class Finalist (Note: In 1984, the Anaheim Kingsmen competed in Class A. This tier has since been renamed Open Class.)
Pale blue background indicates DCI World Class Finalist (Note: From 1972-1988, the Anaheim Kingsmen competed in Open Class. This tier has since been renamed World Class.)
Dark gold background indicates DCI World Class Champion

Year	Repertoire	World Championships	
Year	Repertoire	Score	Placement
1972	March from Folk Song Suite by Ralph Vaughan Williams / When Johnny Comes Marching Home by Patrick Sarsfield Gilmore / Mickey Mouse Club March by Jimmie Dodd / Ritual Fire Dance (from El Amor Brujo) by Manuel de Falla / Sing, Sing, Sing by Louis Prima / Exodus by Ernest Gold / King of Kings by Miklos Rosza	88.100	1st Place; Open Class; Champion
1973	Suite for Band by Gustav Holst / English Folk Song Suite by Ralph Vaughan Williams / Sabre Dance by Aram Khachaturian / Ritual Fire Dance (from El Amor Brujo) by Manuel de Falla / Sing, Sing, Sing by Louis Prima / El Cid & King of Kings by Miklos Rosza	82.650	6th Place; Open Class; Finalist
1974	Dance at the Gym (from West Side Story) by Leonard Bernstein / March to the Scaffold (from Symphonie Fantastique) by Hector Berlioz / Tubular Bells by Mike Oldfield / Artistry in Rhythm by Stan Kenton / So Very Hard To Go by Emilio Castillo & Stephen Kupka (Tower of Power) / Firebird Suite by Igor Stravinsky	88.550	3rd Place; Open Class; Finalist
1975	Corps inactive		
1976	Mambo (from West Side Story) by Leonard Bernstein / Hill Where the Lord Hides by Chuck Mangione / Cheshire Cat Walk by Chick Corea / Artistry in Rhythm by Stan Kenton / So Very Hard To Go by Emilio Castillo & Stephen Kupka (Tower of Power) / Bravura Finale (from Firebird Suite) by Igor Stravinsky	76.900	19th Place; Open Class
1977	West Side Story Medley by Leonard Bernstein / I Believe in Love (from A Star is Born) by Kenny Loggins & Alan and Marilyn Bergman / Watch Closely Now (from A Star is Born) by Paul Williams & Kenneth Ascher / Evergreen (from A Star is Born) by Barbra Streisand & Paul Williams / Firebird Suite by Igor Stravinsky	83.600	14th Place; Open Class
1978	Symphonie Fantastique by Hector Berlioz / Blue Rondo A La Turk by Dave Brubeck / Selections from Close Encounters of the Third Kind by John Williams	75.000	19th Place; Open Class
1979–81	Corps inactive		
1982	Come Back to Me (from On a Clear Day You Can See Forever) by Burton Lane & Alan Jay Lerner / Evergreen (from A Star is Born) by Barbra Streisand & Paul Williams / Prologue, When You're a Jet, Maria & Gee, Officer Krupke (from West Side Story) by Leonard Bernstein	64.150	28th Place; Open Class
1983	The Heat's On by Sammy Nestico / Mars (from The Planets) by Gustav Holst / Night on Bald Mountain by Modest Mussorgsky / Jupiter (from The Planets) by Gustav Holst / I Believe in Love (from A Star is Born) by Kenny Loggins & Alan and Marilyn Bergman / Evergreen (from A Star is Born) by Barbra Streisand & Paul Williams / E.T. (from E.T.) by John Williams	45.450	33rd Place; Open Class
1984	Ritual Fire Dance (from El Amor Brujo) by Manuel de Falla / All Night Long by Lionel Richie / Rio by Mack David, Oswaldo Santiago & Alcyr Pires Vermelho / Ballet in Brass by Vic Schoen / Evergreen (from A Star is Born) by Barbra Streisand & Paul Williams / Mambo (from West Side Story) by Leonard Bernstein	72.800	8th Place; Class A Finalist
1984	Ritual Fire Dance (from El Amor Brujo) by Manuel de Falla / All Night Long by Lionel Richie / Rio by Mack David, Oswaldo Santiago & Alcyr Pires Vermelho / Ballet in Brass by Vic Schoen / Evergreen (from A Star is Born) by Barbra Streisand & Paul Williams / Mambo (from West Side Story) by Leonard Bernstein	55.800	37th Place; Open Class
1985	Repertoire unavailable	61.400	35th Place; Open Class
1986	Repertoire unavailable	67.700	30th Place; Open Class
1987	Corps inactive		
1988	Repertoire unavailable		Did Not Attend

== Caption awards ==
At the annual World Championship Finals, Drum Corps International (DCI) presents awards to the corps with the high average scores from prelims, semifinals, and finals in five captions. Prior to 2000 and the adoption of the current scoring format, the Anaheim Kingsmen won these captions:

High Color Guard Performance Award

- 1972

High Brass Performance Award

- 1972

High Percussion Performance Award

- 1972
