= Racine Scouts Drum and Bugle Corps =

Racine Scouts Drum & Bugle Corps
- Racine Scouts Drum and Bugle Corps' new logo
- Location: Racine, Wisconsin
- Founded: 1927
- Director: Randall Chaffee

The Racine Scouts (formally the Racine Explorer Scouts) Drum and Bugle Corps was a junior parade Drum and bugle corps. Based in Racine, Wisconsin, the corps marched parades in the Midwestern United States. The Racine Scouts, nicknamed the "Chrome Domes", was the oldest continuously active junior drum and bugle corps in North America until they ceased activity in 2016.

== History ==
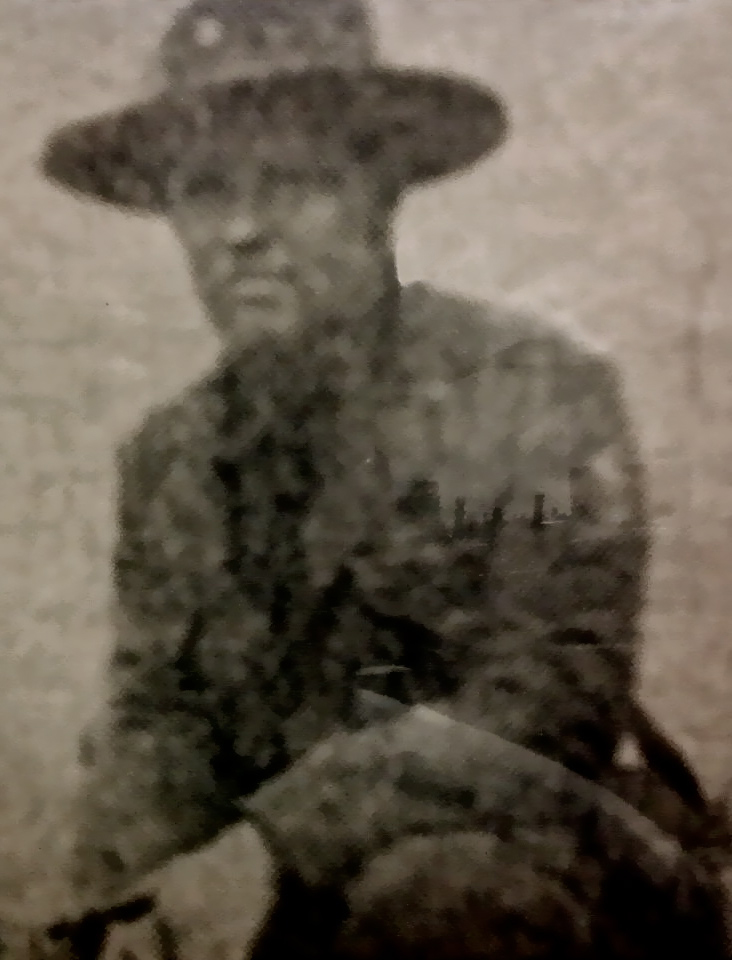
Elof Erickson

The Racine Scouts Drum and Bugle Corps began as an activity of Boy Scout Troop 15 of Racine's Lutheran Church of the Atonement in October 1927 by Scoutmaster Elof Erickson who enlisted Earl Ray as drum instructor and William L. Peterson as bugle instructor and director. Initially, the corps had no instruments; the drummers drummed on any available surface and the buglers sang, hummed, or whistled the music. By 1928 they had become a valid drum and bugle corps, marching in Racine's 4th of July parade for the first time. On October 5, 1929 the corps traveled to Madison, Wisconsin for Boy Scout Day at the University of Wisconsin.

In 1931, sponsorship of the corps was transferred from Troop 15 to the Racine County Council of the Boy Scouts. During the 1930s, the corps was designated as the official musical unit of Boy Scout National Region Seven. It also became the oldest continuously operating corps in Scouting. From 1935 through 1940, the Racine Scouts Drum and Bugle Corps was undefeated in competition. In June and July 1937, the corps attended the National Boy Scout Jamboree in Washington, D.C. where they performed in concert before more than 25,000 Boy Scouts, and led a parade of Scouts to the Tomb of the Unknown Soldier at Arlington National Cemetery, where they performed another concert during a downpour. Also in 1937, they were a part of the first appearance of drum corps at the Wisconsin American Legion State Convention, where they won the $25 first prize as best Scout drum and bugle corps in the parade and were first heard in a radio broadcast.

In 1938, upon seeing a performance of the corps, a group of Madison businessmen were inspired to start a local Boy Scout corps themselves. They asked for Racine's help with staff, music, and support for their start-up of the Madison Scouts Drum and Bugle Corps. That same year, the corps performed on NBC's "Worldwide Round Up" national radio broadcast. Also in 1938, the corps performed at the Century of Progress World's Fair in Chicago where their buglers first performed on single piston bugles.

1939 saw the Racine Scouts playing the national anthems of the U.S. and Denmark during the visit of the Danish Crown Prince to Racine and their first VFW appearance, when, although not competing in the field show, they led a section of the parade at the Wisconsin State VFW convention in Racine.

In 1941, the Racine Scouts made their first appearance at a national competition, finishing seventh in the "Junior" competition at the American Legion National Championship held at Municipal Stadium in Wauwatosa, Wisconsin; the corps would not return to any "National" competition until 1954.

Old Racine Scouts Chrome Dome logo

World War II saw many alumni of the Racine Scouts serving in the U.S Armed Forces. Most returned from the war, but some did not. One who did not was Army Air Forces Major Jack Jerstad who was awarded the Medal of Honor for his actions while flying against the Nazi German controlled oil fields at Ploiești, Romania. While its alumni were off to war, the corps did its part for the war effort by performing in patriotic parades and doing concert exhibitions for War Bond drives.

After the War, the Racine Boy Scouts returned to the competition field. In 1947 they traveled to Dearborn, Michigan to perform at the funeral of Henry Ford. They also became the first "outside" organization to perform at the National Music Camp at Interlochen, Michigan. Also in 1947, they were seen by Scoutmaster Don Warren of Chicago's Troop 111, who then decided to start the drum and bugle corps that would become known as the Cavaliers.

1948 saw the Scouts win the first of many Wisconsin American Legion State Championship titles. In 1949 was begun the long rivalry between the Racine Scouts and the Racine YMCA Kilties (who had been active since 1936, but not very successful), fanned by a barrage of letters to the editor in the pages of the Racine Journal Times newspaper; when the two corps finally had the year's first meeting on July 12 at the State American Legion contest in Milwaukee, the Scouts repeated as champions, with the Kilties second.

The Racine Boy Scouts corps attended the 1950 Boy Scouts National Jamboree at Valley Forge, Pennsylvania, where they were named the "Champions of Scouting" by National Chief Scout Executive Arthur A. Schuck, a title they would bear through the 1950s. The Scouts traveled to New York City following the Jamboree, where the corps was recorded for the international broadcasts of Voice of America. While in New York, the corps managed to play where even corps from the city were forbidden. As permission was being sought for them to perform in a nearby park, the Boy Scouts caused a traffic jam playing the National Anthem in Times Square, despite efforts of the NYPD to halt them.

In 1952, the Scouts made their second appearance at a "National" contest, finishing seventh and missing the finals of the "Junior Division" of the VFW National Championships in Milwaukee by 1/2 of a point. That year the corps also attended the National Boy Scout Jamboree at Irvine Ranch, California and, while there, also performed a concert in Los Angeles at Hollywood and Vine.^{(See: Note A)}

While drum and bugle corps activity blossomed in America during the 1950s, the Racine Boy Scouts were widely criticized within that activity for resting on their laurels and playing in more exhibition concerts than contests. Although the organization started the Racine Jr. Boy Scouts drum and bugle corps as a "feeder" corps in 1956, by that time it was also putting out a younger, less experienced corps than in years past. While corps like the Kilties, the Madison Scouts, the Cavaliers, and other newer, younger corps were flourishing, the Racine Boy Scouts seemed to be going into decline.

In 1957, the Scouts once more attended the National Scout Jamboree, again in Valley Forge, and also visited Niagara Falls, New York City, and Washington, D.C. Up until 1958, the corps had still been performing on equipment originally purchased in 1935 by the Drum Corps Mother's Club. In 1958, the corps replaced the old wool serge uniforms with new olive drab gabardine uniforms with white neckerchiefs. However, 1958 was the least successful competition season in the corps' history up to that time. This trend was to continue for the next several years.

In 1959 the Scouts undertook a "power tour," making 32 performances through Minnesota, Michigan, and Wisconsin in just five days.

In 1960 the Racine Boy Scouts were once more a feature unit at the National Scout Jamboree in Colorado Springs, Colorado. They appeared in the feature about the Jamboree on the national television broadcast of "World Wide 60." Despite the exposure, the corps still languished on the competition field in both 1960 and 1961. At this time the winter "small corps" concept was a growing activity, with many corps putting out small units for indoor, standstill competitions during the winter months. (This would continue to be a popular activity until the birth of DCI in 1972, and has been experiencing a rebirth in recent years.)

In 1962, the Racine Scouts finished first in both prelims and finals of the Midwest States Small Corps Championship and finished no lower than third in any small corps competition. This resulted in a much improved 1962 summer season with both the Boy Scouts and the Junior Boy Scouts winning their divisions at the State VFW championships. The Scouts also finished twelfth of thirty-four corps at the VFW Nationals in St. Paul, Minnesota.

In 1963, the Racine Scouts traveled to Seattle, Washington for the VFW Nationals and took third place among seventeen corps.

The Racine Scouts performing Bullfighter in 1964

In 1964, the Racine Boy Scouts Drum and Bugle Corps was reorganized as Explorer Scout Post 200, a specialty Explorer post whose specialty was music, and they became the Racine Explorer Scouts Drum and Bugle Corps.^{(See: Note B)} Upon adopting their new name, the corps also changed to the uniform style that continues in use to the present day. That first Explorers corps was quite competitive on the national scene; it finished eighth of seventeen corps at the New York World's Fair show, topping such corps as the Garfield Cadets, Madison Scouts, and Blue Rock (but finishing four spots behind the Kilties). At the VFW Nationals in Cleveland, Ohio, the corps was assessed a two-point penalty that dropped them from tenth place among the forty-three corps to a thirteenth place tie and out of the twelve corps finals. They also again attended the Boy Scouts' Jamboree, once more at Valley Forge.

Although 1965 was somewhat down from 1964, the Explorer Scouts was one of the elite corps from the United States and Canada invited to appear at the "Symphony in Brass" in the sold-out Chicago Civic Opera House concert, an event that was hurrahed in the pages of Drum Corps World magazine as, "...the greatest drum corps spectacle ever to be staged in the Midwest."

1966 was the corps' best season since the early 1950s; the Explorer Scouts won both the Wisconsin American Legion and the Wisconsin VFW championships and claimed the Badgerland Drum Corps Association title among its victories. This was in a year that several other corps in Wisconsin, as well as some corps they regularly competed against from Illinois, were also highly competitive; Wisconsin placed four corps among the top eighteen at VFW Nationals, and Illinois added another five. At those 1966 VFW Nationals, held in Jersey City, New Jersey, the Explorer Scouts finished thirteenth in prelims and twelfth in finals from a field of forty-eight corps.

The 1967 corps was another strong one, with a highlight being the victory in the hometown Racine Boys of 76 senior corps' "Drum Corps Spectacular" on July 3, where the Explorer Scouts triumphed over the Chicago Royal Airs, the Des Plaines Vanguard, the Casper Troopers, the Millstadt Crusaders, and the local Racine YMCA Kilties, five corps that would join them seven weeks later in the VFW National Finals. Of the twenty-five corps at the VFW Championships, the Explorer Scouts finished eighth in prelims and moved up to sixth in finals. In honor of the Corps' 40th anniversary, Racine's Mayor William Beyer proclaimed Friday, August 4, 1967 as "Racine Scout Day."

In 1968, the corps was again one of many groups from Wisconsin and Illinois; six corps from each state would finish in the top 20 of the forty-four corps in VFW prelims, with the Explorer Scouts coming in tenth in prelims and ninth in finals. They also finished 10th at the CYO Nationals in Lowell, Massachusetts.

In January 1969 the Racine Explorer Scouts Drum and Bugle Corps took a huge step: the corps went co-ed, admitting girls over fifteen years of age into the color guard. (This followed the trend that would see only three all-male North American junior corps remaining in 1972.) By March, the Explorer Scouts had thirty-five girls in the all-girl guard and over fifty more on a waiting list. The change did not bring about great success on the competition field, however. Although the corps won several Wisconsin contests, they missed finals at VFW Nationals in Philadelphia when they finished in a sixteenth place tie in the sixty-three corps prelims. The corps did make the eight corps finals at the American Legion Nationals in Atlanta, Georgia, finishing eighth of the twenty corps in attendance.

In March 1970, it was officially announced that the corps had entered into a one-year merger with the Kenosha Queensmen; both corps had suffered major personnel losses, and the merger was seen as a holding action. The resultant Racine Explorer Scouts corps was the largest in the history of either corps, with 115 marching members. The 1970 Explorer Scouts seemed to stagnate, winning only one minor show for the season—a season in which the corps attended no "national" contests.

In 1971, with the merger ended and the Queensmen defunct, pre-season anticipation was high, as the corps routinely had over a hundred members at winter practices and showed extremely well at a pre-season exhibition. The early season saw the corps' first victory over the Kilties in four years, but while the Kilties improved throughout the season, the Explorer Scouts' season declined. At the North American Open they finished seventh of twenty-one corps in prelims and fourth in finals; at the Mid-America Open in Overland Park, Kansas the corps finished eighth in a bevy of good corps on their way to VFW Nationals in Dallas. But at Dallas, the Explorer Scouts once more missed finals, with a fourteenth-place finish among the thirty-five prelims corps.

1972 was another up and down season. The corps won two shows, including the VFW State Championship. They missed finals at the North American Open but finished eleventh at the U.S. Open and fifth of forty-two corps at the VFW Nationals in Minneapolis. The Racine Explorer Scouts chose not to be among the thirty-nine corps that met in Whitewater, Wisconsin on August 17 & 18 of 1972 for the first Drum Corps International World Championships, and the corps would continue to boycott DCI for many years.

The 1973 Explorer Scouts would win another State VFW crown and traveled to California, where they played at Disneyland and finished second in two contests to the Blue Devils Drum and Bugle Corps.

In 1974 the corps competed in Class B contests as the Racine-Kenosha Scout Drum and Bugle Corps.

After a 3-month merger with the Mariners Drum and Bugle Corps of Greendale, Wisconsin in 1975, the corps went on its own and marched in the Illinois Drum Corps Circuit in field competition and the Illinois All American Circuit. They continued in the Illinois All American Circuit of small, locally oriented corps in 1976.

From 1978–1981 the corps also had a winter guard and summer guard that marched at Midwest Color Guard Circuit Shows and VFW Nationals Contest in color guard division. The Scouts also competed in the field show prelims. From 1981–1988, the corps sometimes competed in Class A60/Division III of Drum Corps Midwest (DCM), occasionally attending the DCM Championships in DeKalb, Illinois. starting in 1989 the corps attended every DCM Championship until the circuit suspended operations after the 2005 season.

In 1992 the Scouts attended DCI shows attending the Division III prelims of the U.S. Open in Marion, Ohio and the DCI Division III World Championship prelims at Whitewater. The Scouts have attended DCI World Championships every year since 1994, although they have never made finals in their division.

In 2010 the corps attended the Boy Scouts' National Jamboree at Fort A.P. Hill near Bowling Green, Virginia where they performed in concert before over 43,000 Scouts.

The 2011 season saw an important change to the Racine Scouts horn line. During the early off-season, the staff of the corps decided it would be important to switch the corps to perform on instruments in the key of B-flat rather than the key of G, which the corps had performed on during the preceding few decades. After a few tribulations with attempts in pre-season to acquire new horns, an agreement was made with a DCA corps^{(who?)} to lease their B-flat horns for the summer. The 2011 season subsequently became the first summer the Racine Scouts performed on B-flat horns. The Racine Scouts were one of the last corps in DCI to switch from horns keyed in G to B-flat. That same year, with a new format at the championships, the Racine Scouts competed as a top-level (now known as World Class) corps for the first time since 1974, finishing thirty-ninth of forty-one corps.

The Racine Scouts' 85th anniversary season in 2012 was cut short when the corps administration decided to end the summer tour early after facing insurmountable challenges. The corps did however attend competitions, both DCI-sanctioned and SDCA, allowing the corps to maintain its title of being continuously competitive.

Since 2016, the Racine Scouts has not participated in DCI Summer Music Games.

Note A: Eagle Scout Corps members played at the opening of Disneyland in 1954, at the Gathering of Eagles, representing Region 7.

Note B: What was the Explorer Scouting program in 1964 now falls under the Venturing, Varsity Scouting, and Exploring (Learning for Life) programs of the Boy Scouts of America.

== Mission ==
"The Racine Scouts' purpose is to provide a quality performing ensemble with an emphasis on education as well as instill work ethic and promise in today's youth. The goals and ambitions of the Racine Scouts are to create a performing unit that accepts nothing less than a member's best effort and a strong willingness to improve every day, leading to a unit that is competitive with the top corps in our class. As the ensemble prospers it will be a driving force for the marching arts in Wisconsin and the world. We will create a positive environment for youth to evolve, grow and mature as musicians, performers and young adults."

== Show summary (1995–2024) ==
Year	Theme	Repertoire	Score	Placement
1995	Music of Respighi	Music of Ottorino Respighi	60.70	27th (Div. III)
1996	Dream, Dream, Dream	Day of the Dreamer, Part 1 / Let There Be Praise by Sandi Patty / Theme from Beetlejuice by Danny Elfman	48.40	28th (Div. III)
1997		Big Noise from Winnetka (from Reveille with Beverly) by Bob Haggart and Ray Bauduc / You Always Hurt the One You Love by Doris Fisher and Allan Roberts / Time After Time by Sammy Cahn and Jule Styne / Patriotic Medley	54.30	27th (Div. III)
1998	Western Chrome	Tumbleweed by Joey Pero / The Big Country by Jerome Moross / Wagon Train by Morton Gould / Western Omlet / Magnificent Seven by Elmer Bernstein / Happy Trails by Dale Evans	67.20	20th (Div. III)
1999		Gunsmoke by Rex Koury / Wild, Wild West by Richard Markowitz / Magnificent Seven by Elmer Bernstein	63.80	25th (Div. III)
2000	Nautical Fantasy	McHale's Navy by Axel Stordahl / Flipper by Henry Vars and William "By" Dunham / Gilligan's Island by Sherwood Schwartz and George Wyle / Blow the Man Down (Traditional) / Popeye The Sailor Man by Sammy Lerner / Columbia the Gem of the Ocean by Thomas á Becket / Oh Shenandoah (Traditional)	55.85	27th (Div. III)
2001	Selections of George Gershwin	An American in Paris / Strike Up the Band (from Strike Up the Band) / Summertime (from Porgy and Bess) / You Can't Take That Away From Me / Rhapsody in Blue / I Got Rhythm (from Girl Crazy); All by George Gershwin	68.35	18th (Div. III)
2002		Moonlight Serenade by Glenn Miller and Mitchell Parish / Bye Bye Blues by Fred Hamm, Dave Bennett, Bert Lown, and Chauncey Gray / The Best is Yet to Come by Cy Coleman and Carolyn Leigh / American Patrol by Glenn Miller / You're a Grand Old Flag by George M. Cohan	57.75	22nd (Div. III)
2003	Shaken, Not Stirred	James Bond Theme by John Barry / Goldeneye by David Arnold / Man with the Golden Gun & Goldfinger by John Barry / Live and Let Die by Linda McCartney and Paul McCartney / Moonraker by John Barry and Hal David	68.35	18th (Div. III)
2004	Funk N' Chrome	Another Star & Don't You Worry Bout A Thing by Stevie Wonder / Stayin' Alive by Barry, Robin, and Maurice Gibb / Salsation by David Shire / How Deep is Your Love? by Barry, Robin and Maurice Gibb / Boogie Wonderland by Allee Willis and Jon Lind / I Will Survive by Freddie Perren and Dino Fekaris	56.40	16th (Div. III)
2005		Repertoire not available	64.775	16th (Div. III)
2006		Repertoire not available	59.475	13th (Div. III)
2007	Portraits in Chrome: Idols, Icons and Images	Selections from the music of Irving Berlin / Old Man River (From Showboat) by Jerome Kern	66.175	13th (Div. III)
2008	Frankly, Sinatra	All The Way by Jimmy Van Heusen / The Way You Look Tonight (from Swing Time) by Jerome Kern / Come Fly with Me by Sammy Cahn / "I've Got You Under My Skin" (from Night and Day) by Cole Porter / Luck Be a Lady (from Guys and Dolls) by Frank Loesser / That's Life by Dean Kay and Kelly Gordon / The Lady is a Tramp (from Babes in Arms) by Richard Rodgers and Lorenz Hart	74.30	20th (Open Class)
2009	New York Under Chrome Lights	New York State of Mind by Billy Joel / Give My Regards to Broadway (from Yankee Doodle Dandy) by George M. Cohan / 42nd Street by Harry Warren and Al Dubin / Harlem Nocturne by Earle Hagen and Dick Rogers / Sing, Sang, Sung by Gordon Goodwin / New York, New York (from New York New York) by John Kander and Fred Ebb	72.70	16th (Open Class)
2010	Fascinating Rhythms - The Music of George Gershwin	An American in Paris / Strike Up the Band / Summertime; I Loves You, Porgy; and Bess, You is My Woman Now (from Porgy and Bess) / Rhapsody in Blue / I Got Rhythm; All by George Gershwin	74.50	13th (Open Class)
2011	Resurrection	Lux Aeternum from Requiem by John Rutter / Dies Irae (from Requiem) by Giuseppe Verdi / Ave Maria by Johann Sebastian Bach and Charles Gounod / Ascension (from Divine Comedy) by Robert W. Smith / "Onward Christian Soldiers" by Arthur Sullivan and Sabine Baring-Gould	69.55; 48.50	14th (Open Class); 39th (World Class)
2012	We, The People - The American Experience	American Salute & Amber Waves by Morton Gould / America the Beautiful by Samuel A. Ward and Katharine Lee Bates		
2013	From the Ashes	The Firebird by Igor Stravinsky	70.400; 55.600	12th (Open Class); 35th (World Class)
2014	87	Eine Kleine Nachtmusik by Wolfgang Amadeus Mozart / Four Score and Seven by Vic Schoen / Once Upon a Time (from All American) by Charles Strouse and Lee Adams / 7/8 by Colin Benders a.k.a. Kyteman / Crown Imperial by William Walton	58.850; 55.600	13th (Open Class); 35th (World Class)
2015	Behind the Brush Strokes… A journey through the mind of Vincent van Gogh	Vincent by Don McLean / Ritual Fire Dance by Manuel De Falla / 1000 Airplanes on the Roof by Philip Glass / Music by Eric Morales	55.225; 49.450	13th (Open Class); 38th (World Class)
2016-24		Opted out of competition		

== Traditions ==
=== Scouting heritage ===
The corps maintained its ties to the Boy Scouts of America organization. The corps' symbol was 2 horns with a drum and a set of bells behind them - based on the Music Merit Badge. Until the late 1950s, the Racine Scouts required every member to be at least a First Class Scout. The Racine Scouts have been the oldest musical unit in American Scouting since the 1930s.

=== Corps song ===
The corps song was the melody to You'll Never Walk Alone, with original lyrics of special significance to the corps.
