= List of defunct Drum Corps International member corps =

Drum Corps International (DCI) is the largest governing body for drum and bugle corps in the world. Since its first competitive season in 1972, hundreds of corps have held membership, many of which have become inactive. This page is a list of defunct Drum Corps International member corps, particularly those that have been finalists multiple times.

== 27th Lancers Drum and Bugle Corps ==
27th Lancers
- Location: Revere, Massachusetts
- Division: Open Class
- Founded: 1967
- Folded: 1986
- Championship titles: CYO: 1977; 1981

The 27th Lancers Drum and Bugle Corps was an Open Class (Note: From 1973 to 1991, the top division was called Open Class. From 1992 to 2007, it was called Division I. Since 2008, it has been called World Class. These are all the same tier, just renamed.) corps based in Revere, Massachusetts. The Lancers were one of the thirteen founding member corps of Drum Corps International. The group was founded in the fall of 1967 after the I. C. Reveries, who sponsored two corps, folded. The larger corps of the I. C. Reveries, led by George Bonfiglio, rebranded itself as the 27th Lancers, while the feeder corps branched off and eventually became a facet of the North Star Drum and Bugle Corps.

The corps played in Catholic Youth Organization (CYO) and Veterans of Foreign Wars (VFW) drum corps competitions, but they eventually became dissatisfied with the rigid rules and low payouts. In 1971, the 27th Lancers, along with the Blessed Sacrament Golden Knights, Blue Rock, Garfield Cadets, and Boston Crusaders, formed the United Organization of Junior Corps (popularly known as "The Alliance") and marketed themselves as a package deal. This paralleled another group in the country known as the Midwest Alliance. These two groups eventually joined together and formed Drum Corps International.

The 27th Lancers made a total of twelve finals appearances during their fifteen years as members of DCI. In 1980, they earned their highest position with a silver medal. That year, they were also chosen to represent North American drum corps at the 1980 Winter Olympics in Lake Placid, New York, playing for the opening and closing ceremonies. In 1985, they placed 13th, just outside of qualifying for finals. Citing financial difficulties, the corps folded after the 1986 season. In 1994, an alumni corps was assembled to perform one last time at finals, serving as an exhibition corps.

== Argonne Rebels Drum and Bugle Corps ==
Argonne Rebels
- Former name: St. Rose
- Location: Great Bend, Kansas
- Division: Open Class
- Founded: 1947
- Folded: 1984
- Championship titles: American Legion: 1971; 1972; 1973

The Argonne Rebels Drum and Bugle Corps was an Open Class corps. Based in Great Bend, Kansas, the Rebels were one of the thirteen founding member corps of Drum Corps International.

The group was founded in 1947 by local music teacher John Taff as the St. Rose Drum and Bugle Corps. Sponsored by the local Catholic church, they operated as a parade band. Due to the financial burden imposed onto the church, they later became sponsored by Argonne Post #180 of the American Legion. After taking on their current moniker, the corps began to compete in American Legion drum corps competitions starting in 1955. They earned three national championships in the circuit from 1971 to 1973.

In October 1971, the corps was invited to become charter members of DCI. They appeared at the inaugural championships placing 5th. After one more finals placement the next year, the corps dropped to 33rd place in 1974 after the departure of many of its staff. After a few more years of waning competitive success, the corps went inactive after the 1979 season. The Argonne Rebels returned as a Class A (Note: From 1975 to 1991, the secondary division was called Class A. From 1992 to 2007, it was called Division II. Since 2008, it has been called Open Class. These are all the same tier, just renamed.) corps in 1983, but went permanently defunct after the 1984 season.

== Bridgemen Drum and Bugle Corps ==
Bridgemen
- Former name: St. Andrew's Bridgemen
- Location: Bayonne, New Jersey
- Division: Open Class
- Founded: 1964
- Folded: 1988

The Bridgemen Drum and Bugle Corps (formerly St. Andrew's Bridgemen) was an Open Class corps. Based in Bayonne, New Jersey, the Bridgemen were among the thirty-nine corps present at the first Drum Corps International championships. Named after the Bayonne Bridge, the drum corps was famous for their bright yellow coats and their Broadway-inspired choreography.

The Bridgemen were founded in 1964 by local Catholic pastor Joseph Donovan who saw a drum corps as a good youth activity for the local parish. They had their first public performances as a parade band in 1965 and eventually started to compete in local drum corps competitions the next year. In 1967, the Bayonne Kidets, a feeder corps made up of elementary school students, debuted. In 1972, the Bridgemen joined the newly formed Drum Corps International, placing 11th in the inaugural championship.

In 1977, the Bridgemen were disqualified after prelims due to overaged members. This led to the organization suing and successfully getting a court injunction to allow them to compete in finals where they placed 4th. However, binding arbitration in the fall upheld their disqualification while allowing them to retain their prize money. Nonetheless, they were eventually allowed to compete the next season in 1978, earning 5th place.

The Bridgemen reached their zenith in the early eighties, earning the bronze medal in 1980 and winning high percussion three times in a row under arranger Dennis DeLucia. However, 1983 would be the last year that the Bridgemen made finals. Owing in part to the change in judging criteria and the large number of members aging out, the Bridgemen only reached 14th place in 1984. In 1986, the corps went inactive for a year due to financial hardships. In 1987, the corps returned to the field but failed to qualify for semifinals. This was the last year that the Bridgemen competed, and in 1988, the Bridgemen folded.

== Freelancers Drum and Bugle Corps ==
Freelancers
- Former name: Capitalaires
- Location: Sacramento, California
- Division: Division I
- Founded: 1930
- Folded: 1994

The Freelancers Drum and Bugle Corps (formerly the Capitalaires) (Note: This group was not affiliated with the similarly named CapitolAires, a drum corps from Madison, Wisconsin that competed in the All-Girls division.) was a Division I corps based in Sacramento, California. The group began in 1930 as a parade corps sponsored by the George W. Manhart Post #391 of the American Legion. By 1964, membership had dwindled, and the color guard split off to create an all-girl drum corps known as the Manhart Capitalaires and started competing. The group went co-ed after the 1970 season and changed their name to the Capital Freelancers in 1973 after splitting away from the post.

The group first competed in Drum Corps International in 1975, placing 18th. The next year, they made finals for the first time, placing 11th. Throughout its existence, the corps made a total of ten finals appearances between 1976 and 1992. The corps last competed in 1994, although an alumni corps still appears in the SoundSport division.

== Glassmen Drum and Bugle Corps ==
Glassmen
- Former name(s): Maumee Suns; Glass City Optimists
- Location: Maumee, Ohio; Toledo, Ohio
- Division: World Class
- Founded: 1961
- Folded: 2014

The Glassmen Drum and Bugle Corps was a World Class corps. Based in Toledo, Ohio, the corps was a sixteen-time finalist. The group was founded in 1961 by American Legion Post #320 as the Maumee Suns. It served as the junior corps to the senior Maumee Demons. Originally a parade corps for the first few years of existence, the Maumee Suns first competed in 1964 in the local American Legion circuit. In 1967, the name was changed to the Glass City Optimists in reference to the nickname of Toledo ("The Glass City"). The last name changed occurred in 1971 for the corps to become the Glassmen.

The corps started competing in Drum Corps International competitions in 1975. Unfortunately, after their debut, the corps went inactive to restructure. Returning to competition in 1980, the corps steadily climbed the ranks until they were awarded full membership in 1983. In 1986, Dan Acheson, future chief executive officer of Drum Corps International, was named as corps director. Their first appearance in finals was 1993, ten years after earning membership, where they placed 11th.

The corps remained a consistent finalist for the remainder of its existence, peaking at 5th three times between 1998 and 2001. The Glassmen went inactive before the 2013 season, and the board of directors filed for bankruptcy. In early 2014, the organization was dissolved by a federal court.

== Guardsmen Drum and Bugle Corps ==
Guardsmen
- Location: Schaumburg, Illinois
- Division: Division I
- Founded: 1961
- Folded: 1994

The Guardsmen Drum and Bugle Corps was a Division I corps. Located in Schaumburg, Illinois, the Guardsmen were known for their Britain-inspired themes, using popular folk songs from the country in their shows. The corps was also notable for appearing in advertisements, starring in commercials for Kentucky Fried Chicken and RC Cola during the mid-seventies.

The corps was founded in 1961 as an all-girl drill team; the group became a co-ed drum corps three years later. Throughout the rest of the decade, the group attended local competitions while growing in magnitude. In 1972, the Guardsmen competed in the inaugural Drum Corps International season where they placed 25th. Four years later, in 1976, the corps placed 12th earning their first spot into finals. The corps peaked at 7th place in 1979 before their last appearance as a finalist in 1980. The Guardsmen continued until 1990 when financial difficulties forced the corps into inactivity. A cadet corps briefly resurfaced from 1992 to 1994 until it too ultimately folded.

== Kilties Drum and Bugle Corps ==
Kilties
- Former name: Kiwanis Kilties
- Location: Racine, Wisconsin
- Division: Open Class
- Founded: 1936
- Inactive: 1982 (Junior); 2017 (Senior)
- Championship titles: VFW: 1964; 1968; 1969
- Website: kilties.com

The Kilties Drum and Bugle Corps (popularly known as the Kilts) was an Open Class corps based in Racine, Wisconsin. Through their presence, alongside the Racine Scouts Drum and Bugle Corps and the nearby Horlick Field, Racine was declared by Congress to be the "Drum and Bugle Capital of the World" in 1967.

The corps was founded in 1936 by members of the local YMCA as the Kiwanis Kilties. The name came from their unique uniforms, Royal Stewart tartan kilts, that were donated by the city Kiwanis Club. After serving as a parade band for local events, they first competed in August 1937 at the Chicagoland Music Festival. However, the corps continued to operate primarily as an exhibition unit, playing in halftime shows for the Green Bay Packers and during games of the Racine Belles. It was not until 1949 that the corps began focusing on competitive pursuits, earning top positions in several contests, including that of the American Legion, where they competed against the Racine Scouts for the first time. They also debuted their familiar, yellow MacLeod tartans that same year.

In 1952, the Kilties traveled to the championships of the Veterans of Foreign Wars (VFW) circuit, their first appearance on the national stage, where they placed 4th. This was followed by a 6th-place finish in the championships of the American Legion circuit. From this newfound success in competition, the organization formed a feeder corps known as the Kiltie Kadets in the fall of 1958. During the sixties, the Kilties continued with their upward trajectory, winning the national championships of the VFW three times.

In 1972, they became one of the finalists in the inaugural year of Drum Corps International. They would continue as finalists until 1975 and then again from 1977 to 1978. The corps went inactive in 1980, blaming a poor competitive season the year prior and a lack of local participation and funding. The corps subsequently came back for two more years, last competing in 1982.

In 1992, an alumni corps was formed to celebrate the 20th anniversary of Drum Corps International. From this group, came a competitive senior drum corps bearing the Kilties banner. The senior Kilties began competing in Drum Corps Associates competitions starting in 1995 and continued until 2016. Although the senior drum corps has been inactive since then, the organization still sponsors a concert band and several indoor marching arts programs.

== Magic of Orlando Drum and Bugle Corps ==
The Magic
- Former name: Magic of Orlando
- Location: Orlando, Florida; Clermont, Florida
- Division: Division I
- Founded: 1989
- Folded: 2007
- Championship titles: Division II: 2002

The Magic Drum and Bugle Corps (better known by their original name as the Magic of Orlando) was a Division I corps. Initially based in Orlando and later in Clermont, Florida, Magic was a six-time finalist and the Division II Champion in 2002. Notably, the corps often utilized themes related to Orlandoan entertainment, in particular those of Walt Disney World, through such shows based on Fantasia and the Pirates of the Caribbean. Although the corps itself was not affiliated with Disney, several staff members worked for both organizations, and the corps itself was a frequent clinician for Magic Music Days.

After financial troubles struck the Suncoast Sound Drum and Bugle Corps of Pinellas Park, several of its staff members moved upward toward Orlando to start a new corps. This included the former music director of Suncoast Sound, Robert W. Smith, who became the corps director for the fledgling group. The group was immediately successful, earning semi-finalist status in 1990, the first year of its existence. Four years later, in 1994, they earned a spot in finals.

After the 1999 season, the corps went inactive to recuperate finances. In 2002, the corps returned in full force, albeit competing in Division II as stipulated by Drum Corps International due to their hiatus. Despite part of a lower class, the corps subsequently won their division with a record score of 99.05, and achieved 11th place among all competing corps, again regaining finalist status.

In 2003, the Magic of Orlando once again ran into financial difficulties, relocating to Clermont and opening up bingo operations for fundraising. Despite these fluctuations, the corps maintained an 11th-place finish. For the remaining three seasons, the corps remained firmly in semifinals and rebranded itself as The Magic. Before the 2007 season, the organization announced that it would be going inactive with plans to return in the future.

== Muchachos Drum and Bugle Corps ==
Muchachos
- Location: Hawthorne, New Jersey
- Division: Open Class
- Founded: 1959
- Folded: 1977

The Hawthorne Muchachos Drum and Bugle Corps (Note: Not to be confused with the corps of the same name from Manchester, New Hampshire that formed in 1960) were an Open Class corps formed in 1959 as the junior corps component to the senior corps, the Hawthorne Caballeros. Like the Caballeros, the group was sponsored by American Legion Post #199 of Hawthorne, New Jersey and was known for their Latin-inspired shows. The Muchachos made a total of three finals appearances beginning from the first Drum Corps International championships in 1972 to their highest placement of 4th in 1974.

In 1975, the Muchachos were disqualified from competing in prelims after an overage member was found in the snare line. This proved costly for the Muchachos, as they were not awarded any prize money and were dropped from circuit membership. After placement of 21st in 1976, the Muchachos folded.

== North Star Drum and Bugle Corps ==
North Star
- Location: North Shore, Massachusetts
- Division: Open Class
- Founded: 1975
- Folded: 1982

The North Star Drum and Bugle Corps was an Open Class corps based in the North Shore region of Massachusetts. It was formed in 1975 through a complex merger of five other corps: the Beverly Cardinals, the I. C. Reveries, the Danvers Blue Angels, the Wilmington Crusaders, and the Melrose Legion Vanguard. While only in competition for seven seasons, the corps achieved finalist status three times. The corps folded in 1982 due to financial difficulties.

== Oakland Crusaders Drum and Bugle Corps ==
Oakland Crusaders
- Former name: De La Salle Oaklands
- Location: Toronto, Ontario
- Division: Open Class
- Founded: 1957
- Folded: 1995

The Oakland Crusaders Drum and Bugle Corps (also known as the Etobicoke-Oakland Crusaders; formerly known as the De La Salle Oaklands) was a three-time finalist and one of the thirteen founding members of Drum Corps International. One of two Canadian corps to make multiple appearances in finals, the corps was formed in 1957 from the remnants of the marching band at De La Salle College in Toronto, Ontario.

After making finals during the 1974 season, the De La Salle Oaklands merged with the Etobicoke Crusaders, another corps from Toronto, to form the Oakland Crusaders. This was done both to increase membership of the corps and because the school was no longer able to cover the costs of the activity, forcing the group to become independent. The group continued where they had left off, making finals twice more in the following seasons. Their last year of competition was 1995.

== Seneca Optimists Drum and Bugle Corps ==
Seneca Optimists
- Location: Toronto, Ontario
- Division: Open Class
- Founded: 1976
- Folded: 1978

The Seneca Optimists Drum and Bugle Corps was a short-lived Open Class corps formed from the mergers of two Canadian corps: The Toronto Optimists and the Seneca Princemen. The group made finals twice, the only other Canadian group to make multiple appearances.

The Toronto Optimists were the older corps, formed in 1958 from the remnants of the Opti-Corps. The name came from their sponsorship by the Toronto Optimist Club. The Toronto Optimists were immediately successful, winning eleven consecutive championships for the Canadian Drum and Bugle Corps Association between 1958 and 1968. Seeing how dominant Drum Corps International had become, the corps decided to compete in the fledgling circuit, placing 34th in 1974 and 16th in 1975, the largest leap in placements ever. However, the group needed more money and members to compete with the larger American contenders.

The Seneca Princemen were formed in 1962 as the Scarborough Firefighters. Later, they became the official music group of Seneca College in 1972, changing their name correspondingly. After the 1975 season, the director of the Seneca Princemen wished to retire, and the Toronto Optimists seized the opportunity to combine the two groups. From this merge came the Seneca Optimists. Now sponsored by both the college and the club, and with several more members and instructional staff, the Seneca Optimists were able to make finals in 1976, their first year of existence, just under their rivals, the Oakland Crusaders. The next year, they rose up past the Crusaders to place 8th, their second and last time in finals. The 1978 season was marked by a large departure of members, and the corps struggled competitively. With a lack of members interested and the corps suffering administrative issues, the corps disbanded in the following months.

== Sky Ryders Drum and Bugle Corps ==
Sky Ryders
- Location: Hutchinson, Kansas; DeSoto, Texas; Kansas City, Missouri
- Division: Division I
- Founded: 1955
- Folded: 1994

The Sky Ryders Drum and Bugle Corps was a Division I corps. Based in Hutchinson, Kansas and later in DeSoto, Texas, the Sky Ryders were a six-time finalist. The group was formed in 1955 with the support of Lysle Rishel Post #68 of the American Legion.

After playing in state competitions for the first few years of existence, the Sky Ryders quickly established themselves on the national scene by making finals for the American Legion championships in 1959. It was also around this time that the corps also established a feeder corps, the Jets, to help recruit and train younger members.

In 1972, the corps competed in the inaugural Drum Corps International championships, placing 20th out of 39 corps. After another few years of playing for local shows, the Sky Ryders returned to Drum Corps International competition in 1977, competing in Class A, the secondary class, where they placed 3rd. In 1982, after rising in placements over five seasons, the corps placed 10th, becoming a finalist. Throughout the eighties, the corps became known as the "storytellers" of drum corps, designing shows based on popular musicals such The Sound of Music and The Wizard of Oz. They also maintained their status as perennial finalists, making finals four more times. In 1990, the corps declared bankruptcy and moved from Kansas to Texas, despite protests from the local community. This was due to dwindling sponsorship from local groups and the fact that many of their members came from Texas.

The sixth and last time the corps made finals was in 1991 with a theme based on Camelot, another musical. However, behind the scenes, the corps was once again struggling financially, unable to run a bingo operation as planned due to state restrictions on new non-profits. After the 1993 season, the corps declared bankruptcy for the second time.

The latest iteration of the Sky Ryders formed in Kansas City, Missouri as an exhibition corps, marching in parades and hosting several competitions. However, it never fully formed a competitive unit and dissolved in 2003. In 2023, a group of alumni organized the Sky Ryders Performing Arts Foundation with the goal of returning to the field in the near future. The new corps began competing as a SoundSport team in 2024.

== Suncoast Sound Drum and Bugle Corps ==
Suncoast Sound
- Location: Clearwater, Florida; Pinellas Park, Florida
- Division: Division I
- Founded: 1979
- Folded: 1995

The Suncoast Sound Drum and Bugle Corps was a Division I corps. Originally from Clearwater and later Pinellas Park, Florida, they were a seven-time finalist. The corps was known for its jazz-influenced shows that depicted scenes of Florida. This distinctive style was coined as "sunjazz" by fans.

The group was founded in 1979 by former band director of Largo High School, Robert Cotter, in an attempt to get more youths in the area involved with the marching arts. At the invitation of Queen Elizabeth II, the new corps performed its first show in England for the Royal Tournament that year. This decision caused a considerable source of friction between the Largo High School band and the fledgling corps, as many of the band members felt that the original invitation had been directed toward them. Because of its European trip, the corps competed in only one other show before entering prelims where they placed 40th.

Through the early eighties, Suncoast Sound gradually became a forceful contender with the help of program coordinator and brass arranger Robert W. Smith. By 1983, the corps had earned a spot in finals, where they would comfortably remain through 1989. In 1985, Suncoast Sound debuted the first all-original music program in the history of Drum Corps International.

In 1986, the corps was sponsored by Circle K, a convenience store chain. However, the following November, Circle K pulled their funding from the corps citing that they did not receive enough promotion from the group. This blindsided the corps leadership who struggled to find new sponsors after many corporations had already set aside their donation budgets. Over the next couple of years, the corps struggled to meet its fundraising goals, and, after the 1989 season, went inactive to restructure. While inactive, the organization was represented by two local parade and exhibition groups: the Suncoast Sound Cadets, a corps composed of students under fifteen, and the Suncoast Gold, an alumni corps. After a two-year hiatus, Suncoast Sound returned to the field in 1992, competing in Division III where they found moderate success. However, partway through the 1995 season, the corps ran out of funding and was forced to end operations just before completing their tour.

== Velvet Knights Drum and Bugle Corps ==
Velvet Knights
- Location: Anaheim, California
- Division: Division I
- Founded: 1963
- Folded: 1997

The Velvet Knights Drum and Bugle was a Division I corps. Based in Anaheim, California, the corps was affectionately known as the "Clown Princes of Drum Corps". Said to have captured the rebellious surfer image associated with California, they were largely known for their burlesque show concepts. In contrast to the normal military-based uniforms worn by most drum corps, the Velvet Knights donned a uniform consisting of Converse sneakers, baseball caps, and faux-tuxedos.

The Velvet Knights split off from the Anaheim Explorer Scouts Drum and Bugle Corps in the fall of 1963. The Anaheim Explorer Scouts eventually became the Anaheim Kingsmen and both groups found great competitive success in the California American Legion competitions. Due to their intertwined history and the proximity of their corps halls, staff and members would often move between the two.

The Velvet Knights first competed in Drum Corps International in 1973, placing twenty-ninth in prelims among forty-eight corps. The corps did not, however, return to competition in the circuit until 1977, when they finished in 25th place and earned full membership. The corps continued in competition with similar placements until taking the year off in 1980 to march as a parade corps and restructure. The corps returned to competition the next year at 33rd place. Seeking a way to differentiate themselves from the several hundred of other corps in competition, the decision was made to march the 1982 season in Hawaiian shirts and straw hats. This new eccentric style proved helpful, and the corps made finals the following year. The corps made finals a total of eight times between 1984 and 1992, reaching their highest placement of 7th in 1987.

From 1992, the corps saw a sharp decline in its fundraising from bingo. This led to growing debt and an eventual audit from the Internal Revenue Service (IRS). Its financial and legal troubles led to the demise of the corps in 1997. Several of its staff and members later helped found the Impulse Drum and Bugle Corps in 1998.
