= Mt. Carmel High School (San Diego) =

Public high school in San Diego, California, United States

Coordinates: 32°58′0″N 117°7′16″W

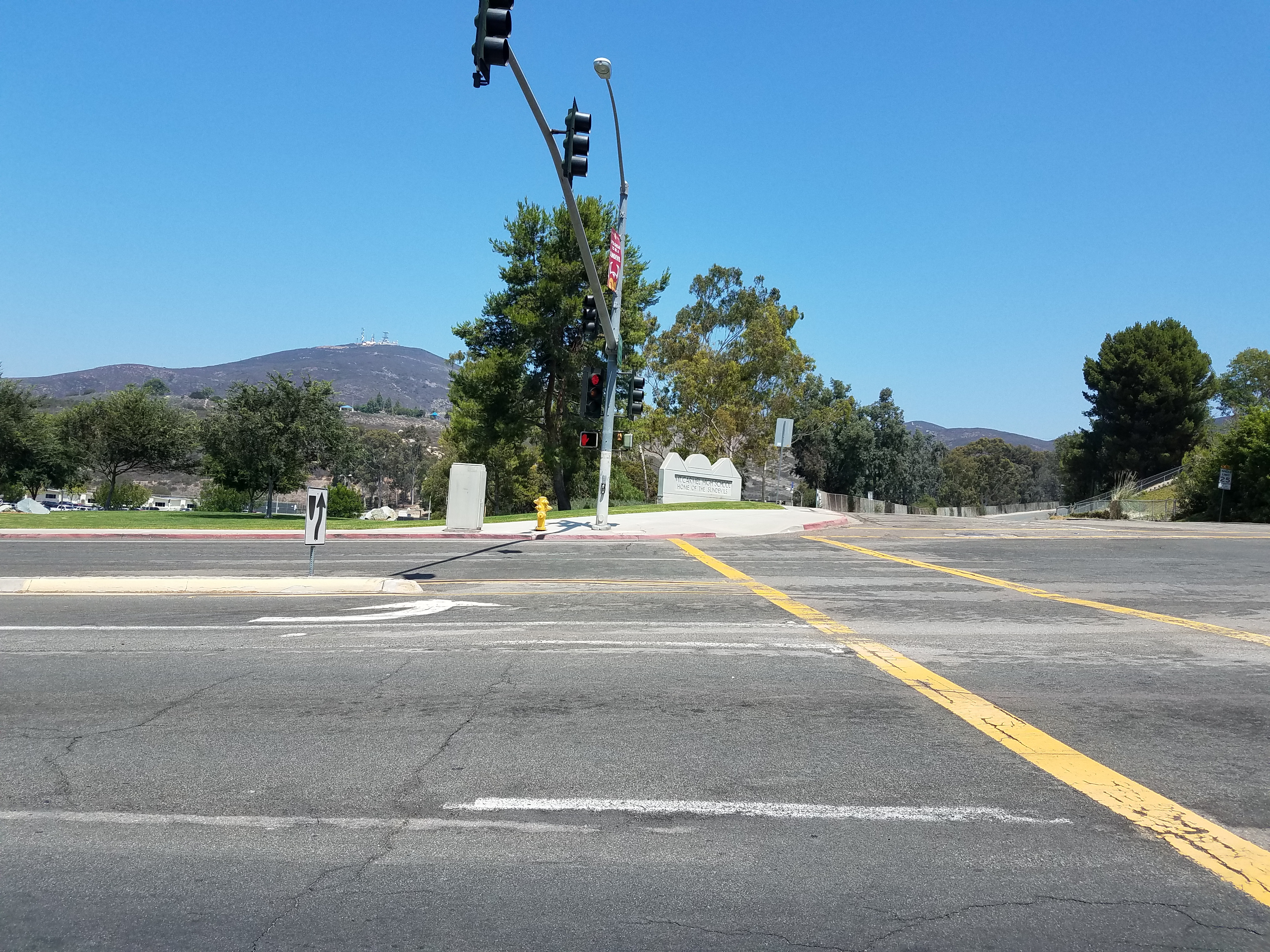

Location
- 9550 Carmel Mountain Road; San Diego, California 92129; United States

Information
- Type: Public
- Established: 1974
- School district: Poway Unified School District
- Principal: Yael Bozzay
- Grades: 9–12
- Enrollment: 1,831 (2023-2024)
- Colors: Scarlet and Gold
- Athletics conference: CIF San Diego Section
- Mascot: Sunny the Sundevil
- Team name: Sundevils
- Rival: Westview High School
- Publication: The Mt. Carmel SUN
- Website: Mt. Carmel H.S. website

Mt. Carmel High School (MCHS) is a public secondary school in Rancho Peñasquitos, a community of San Diego, California, United States. It is part of Poway Unified School District. The school's mascot is the Sundevil.

Mt. Carmel High School is both a California Distinguished School Award winner (1985, 1999, 2005, 2019) and a National Blue Ribbon School (1989, 2000). Mt. Carmel was named a California Gold Ribbon School (replaced Distinguished School Award for a short time) in 2017. Mt. Carmel was named a California Honor Roll School by Educational Results Partnership for the 2017–18, 2016–17, and 2015–16 school years.

== History ==
Mt. Carmel High School was built in 1974, with its first fall semester classes being held at the neighboring Black Mountain Middle School while the rest of the construction was finished.

In 1999, the movie Bring It On filmed on the campus, with the locker room, weight room, and football scoreboard making it into the film.

In the spring of 2004, after the passage of California Proposition U and funds approved by district voters, the school received funding for a major renovation that took place from 2004 to 2007. In addition to modernizing existing buildings, including the practical arts and sciences departments, the project constructed several new buildings, including a new facility for the wrestling and gymnastics teams, and a new band room. The "Theater at the Mount" was the last main building that was under construction, completed in September 2007, along with the choir and drama rooms.

== Enrollment ==
As of 2019–2020, the total number of students enrolled is 1,898 students. Breaking down the number of students by grade level, 438 students in 9th, 480 in 10th, 485 in 11th, and 475 in 12th. The student body is 39.1% White, 24.7% Asian, 18% Hispanic or Latino, 3.3% Black or African American, 0.6% Native Hawaiian or Pacific Islander, and 0.2% American Indian or Alaska Native.

== Stadium ==
Mt. Carmel's on-campus football field, Sundevil Stadium, is a multi-purpose venue designed for football, soccer, lacrosse, track and field, and the annual Mt. Carmel Tournament of Bands, which is held on the 4th Saturday of each October. The stadium was designed in 1971 and opened in 1977, with a capacity of 6,000. The Mt. Carmel football team's successes in the late 1980s and early 1990s brought Sundevil Stadium its first, and to date, only major renovation after the 1991 season, adding seats to both the home and visitor sides, raising total capacity to 11,000, making it the largest on-campus high school stadium in the state of California. Following the 2002–2003 school year, and in conjunction with the other major upgrades to the school, the natural grass field was removed and artificial turf was installed. Renovations started in August 2009 and were completed in July 2010 adding handicap accessibility to every section in the stadium, handrails were put on every staircase, plus handicap seating was installed at the top of sections 2, 3, 5, 9, and 11. In August 2007, the stadium was the host of a Drum Corps International competition featuring Phantom Regiment, Carolina Crown, The Colts, Spirit from JSU, Blue Stars, Madison Scouts, Pacific Crest, and Pioneer.

== Instrumental music program ==
Mt. Carmel's two-time Grammy Award-winning band and orchestra, were directed by nationally recognized director, the late Warren Torns (d 2022), Garry McPherson (now retired), and are now directed by Martin Fierro, former assistant director of Westview High School's band program. In 1988, under the direction of Tom Cole, the Marching Sundevil Band was featured in the opening scenes of the movie "Little Nikita", starring Sidney Poitier, River Phoenix, and Richard Jenkins. The school's Marching Band, Concert Band, Wind Ensemble II, Wind Ensemble I, and orchestra are led by Martin Fierro. The school performed in the 2010 Fiesta Bowl, both in the field tournament and parade. The band took 2nd in the field show competition by .05 and 1st place in the parade making them the overall champions of the Fiesta Bowl National Band Championship. Mt. Carmel competes against the top bands in Southern California annually at the Southern California School Band and Orchestra Association (SCSBOA) Championships. They have been Gold Medal Champions for the field show tournament in the 6A Division class multiple times including 5 consecutive years from 2015 to 2019. In 2006, the Marching Sundevils performed for the 11th time in the Tournament of Roses Parade in Pasadena, California. In 2005, Mt. Carmel's Music Department hosted the Holiday Bowl High School Band Competition. The annual Mt. Carmel Tournament of Bands has been held each October since 1976 and is the most widely attended parade and field competition in San Diego with over 30 bands in attendance.

== Notable alumni ==
- Eric Anthony, retired baseball player
- Billy Beane, general manager and minority owner of Oakland Athletics; storyline of 2011 film Moneyball centers around Beane
- Darren Balsley, pitching coach, San Diego Padres
- Eric Chavez, retired baseball player
- Jose “J-Si” Chavez, television and syndicated radio Host
- Steve Cherundolo, soccer player, Hannover 96 and U.S. National Soccer Team, Los Angeles FC coach
- Kristie Fox, softball player
- Chase Ellison, actor
- John Hyden, professional volleyball player
- Johnny Jeter, professional wrestler
- Troy Johnson, food critic, author, and judge for TV Food Network shows
- Lars Jorgensen, Olympic swimmer and college coach
- Stephen Koehler, United States Navy admiral
- Adam Lambert, singer, recording artist, American Idol Season 8 finalist
- Matt Miller, football player
- CeCe Moore, genetic genealogist and television personality
- Eric Munson, baseball player, 1999 Major League Baseball draft third overall pick, and coach
- Justin Ponsor, comic book colorist for Marvel Comics
- Duke Preston, American football player, Dallas Cowboys
- Aodhan Quinn, professional soccer player
- Leigh Ann Robinson, professional soccer player
- Rashid Shaheed, American football player, Seattle Seahawks, winner of a Super Bowl ring with Seahawks 2025-2026 season
- Ricky Sharpe, football player
- John Smedley, video game executive and founder of EverQuest, Verant Interactive, and Daybreak Game Company
- Scott Speer, film director and author
- Kirk Stackle, Olympic swimmer for the United States
- Usha Vance, Second Lady of the United States since 2025
- Atom Willard, American drummer

== Notable staff ==
- Drew Westling, football coach and player

== See also ==
- Primary and secondary schools in San Diego
