= Troopers Drum and Bugle Corps =

Junior drum and bugle corps based in Casper, Wyoming

Troopers
- Location: Casper, Wyoming
- Division: World Class
- Founded: 1957
- Director: Mary Duerkop
- Championship titles: CYO: 1968; 1969; 1970; VFW: 1966; 1970
- Website: troopersdrumcorps.org

The Troopers Drum and Bugle Corps is a World Class competitive junior drum and bugle corps. Based in Casper, Wyoming, the Troopers was one of the thirteen founding member corps of Drum Corps International (DCI).

== History ==
=== The early years ===
James E. "Jim" Jones, a Casper, Wyoming building contractor and a veteran of the World War II United States Army Air Forces founded the Troopers Drum and Bugle Corps in 1957 as an activity for local youth. In his own youth, Jones had won the American Legion individual snare drum championship while a member of Casper's Sons of the American Legion drum and bugle corps, in which he had also been the corps manager from age fifteen. He decided to name the new corps the Troopers to honor the 11th Ohio Cavalry Regiment, a United States Army unit stationed at Fort Caspar, Wyoming Territory, to protect supply trains during the Indian Wars of the 19th Century. In order to fund the new corps, Jones took out a $4,000 loan to purchase drums and bugles.

In its first season, the Troopers were sponsored by the Casper American Legion post, were strictly a parade corps, and made the corps' first appearance at the State American Legion Convention in Riverton, Wyoming. In 1958, the corps entered its first field competitions. As it was necessary for the Troopers to travel extensively to compete in drum and bugle corps competitions, Jones chartered passenger buses to carry the Troopers across and around the country on trips that would last for several weeks, making the corps a "touring corps", a concept that was unusual at the time.

Their first national contest was the 1961 American Legion Championships in Denver, where the corps finished fourth. The Troopers' first major victory was in the 1965 World Open in Bridgeport, Connecticut. In 1966, the Troopers won the VFW Nationals. In 1967, the Wyoming State Legislature designated the Troopers as Wyoming's Musical Ambassadors.

The corps won the CYO Nationals three years in a row, from 1968 to 1970. In 1970, they won their second VFW National Championship in Miami Beach, added their third CYO title in Boston, and appeared on national TV during the halftime of a Minnesota Vikings NFL game. In 1971, the Troopers were the stars of a television special, "The Troopers Are Coming", narrated by actor Walter Brennan.

=== The Drum Corps International era ===
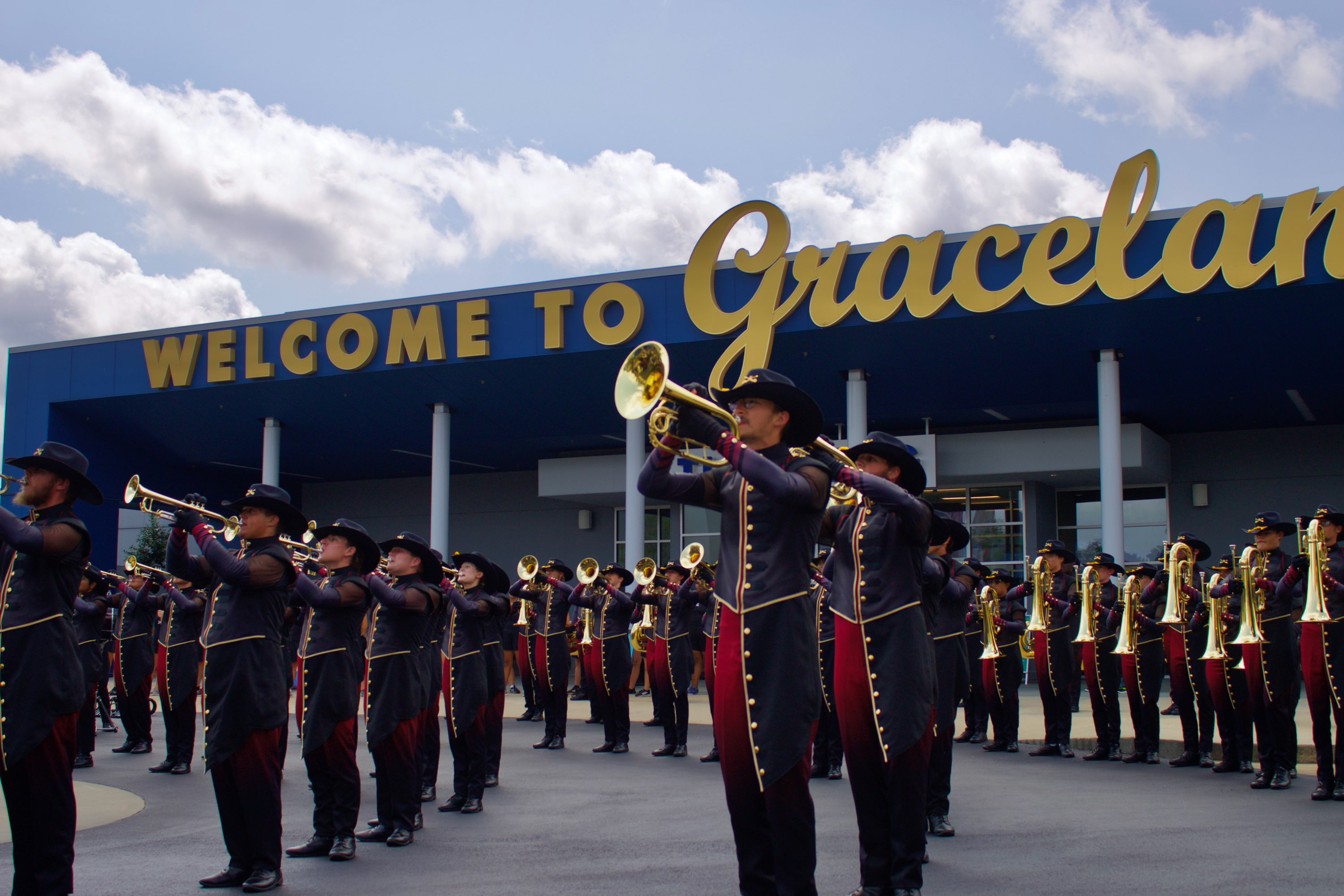
The Troopers in 2021

In 1971, at the urging of Jim Jones and Cavaliers founder Don Warren, the Blue Stars, Cavaliers, Madison Scouts, Santa Clara Vanguard, and the Troopers formed the Midwest Combine. This action was taken in reaction to the rigid, inflexible rules of the American Legion and VFW (the primary rule makers and sponsors of both corps and shows) and the low or nonexistent performance fees paid for appearing in the various competitions. The corps felt that not only were they having their creative potential as artistic performing groups stifled, but they were being financially starved. (A similar group of Eastern corps, the United Organization of Junior Corps, known as the "Alliance", was formed by the 27th Lancers, Garfield Cadets, Boston Crusaders, Blessed Sacrament Golden Knights, and Blue Rock.) The Combine members felt that the corps should be making their own rules, operating their own competitions and championships, and keeping the bulk of the profit that shows earned. For the 1971 season, the group of corps stuck together, offering show promoters the five corps as a package.

In 1972, the Troopers, along with the nine other corps from the Midwest Combine and the Alliance, plus the Anaheim Kingsmen, Argonne Rebels, and De La Salle Oaklands became the founding members of Drum Corps International, which remains as the current sanctioning body for junior corps in North America. At the first DCI World Championships in Whitewater, Wisconsin, the Troopers finished in sixth place. For DCI's first four years, Troopers were an annual finalists. Jim Jones retired as the Troopers' director in 1987.

In 2005, the DCI Board of Directors suspended the Troopers from competition for non-compliance with membership rules. The corps was inactive for the 2006 season, while they reorganized. On October 3, 2006, the Troopers were reinstated as a Division I corps. The Troopers returned to competition for the 2007 season.

In 2021, corps director Kristy Jackson stepped down after facing allegations of gross negligence, which included allegations of improperly handling a sexual assault in 2016 of a color guard member. Michael Gough replaced her in January of the same year.

The change in leadership began a rebirth of competitive success for the Troopers. Under the direction of Michael Gough and Program Coordinator, Tim Snyder the corps returned to DCI finals in 2022, and improved upon their placement in 2023.

Following the conclusion of the 2023 season, Michael Gough stepped into the role of executive director, and Mary Cowperthwait, the former brass caption head, became corps director. The corps continued their finalist placements in 2024 and 2025.

== Show summary (1972–2027) ==
Key
Pale green background indicates DCI World Class Semifinalist (Note: From 1972-1991, the Troopers competed in Open Class; from 1992-2007 in Division I, and since 2008 in World Class. These are the same tier, just renamed.)
Pale blue background indicates DCI World Class Finalist

Year	Repertoire	World Championships	
Year	Repertoire	Score	Placement
1972	Ghost Riders in the Sky by Stan Jones / Battle Hymn of the Republic by William Steffe & Julia Ward Howe / Cincinnati Kid by Lalo Schifrin & Dorcas Cochran / When Johnny Comes Marching Home by Louis Lambert (Patrick Sarsfield Gilmore) / How the West Was Won by Alfred Newman	81.95	6th Place; Open Class; Finalist
1973	Ghost Riders in the Sky by Stan Jones / The Eagle Screams by Nelson Riddle / Black Saddle by Michael Hennagin / Wedding Dance (from Hassaneh Suite) by Jacques Press / Thanksgiving Hymn by Eduard Kremser / Day By Day (from Godspell) by Stephen Schwartz / Battle Hymn of the Republic by William Steffe & Julia Ward Howe	86.15	2nd Place; Open Class; Finalist
1974	Ghost Riders in the Sky by Stan Jones / Yankee Doodle (Traditional) / Yellow Rose of Texas (Traditional) / The Virginian by Percy Faith / Tubular Bells by Mike Oldfield / Thanksgiving Prayer by Eduard Kremser / Day By Day (from Godspell) by Stephen Schwartz / Battle Hymn of the Republic by William Steffe & Julia Ward Howe	85.65	5th Place; Open Class; Finalist
1975	Introduction and Fantasia by Rex Mitchell / Tubular Bells by Mike Oldfield / Gentle On My Mind by John Hartford / Night on Bald Mountain by Modest Mussorgsky / The Virginian by Percy Faith / No Goodbye (from How the West Was Won) by Alfred Newman / Bound for the Promised Land (from How the West Was Won) by Ken Darby & Robert Emmett Dolan	76.20	12th Place; Open Class; Finalist
1976	Roundabout by Jon Anderson & Steve Howe (Yes) / Alabama Jubilee by George L. Cobb & Jack Yellen / Land of Make Believe by Chuck Mangione / Looking for Space by John Denver / Jet by Paul & Linda McCartney (Wings)	82.75	13th Place; Open Class
1977	Hang 'em High by Dominic Frontiere / When Johnny Comes Marching Home by Louis Lambert (Patrick Sarsfield Gilmore) / Rodeo by Aaron Copland / Drunken Cowboy / Billy's Death (from Billy the Kid) & Hoedown (from Rodeo) by Aaron Copland / Farandole by Georges Bizet / Bound for the Promised Land (from How the West Was Won) by Ken Darby & Robert Emmett Dolan / Shenandoah (Traditional) / Wild Wild West by Richard Markowitz	78.80	20th Place; Open Class
1978	Hang 'em High by Dominic Frontiere / American Salute by Morton Gould / Maple Leaf Rag by Scott Joplin / Rodeo & Hoedown (from Rodeo) by Aaron Copland / Farandole by Georges Bizet / The Ballad of Billy the Kid by Billy Joel / The Ecstasy of Gold by Ennio Morricone	74.25	20th Place; Open Class
1979	Variations on a Scene by Alan Broadbent / Aquarius & Let The Sunshine In (from Hair) by Galt MacDermot, James Rado & Gerome Ragni / The Ballad of Billy the Kid by Billy Joel / The Ecstasy of Gold by Ennio Morricone / Ghost Riders in the Sky by Stan Jones	77.90	12th Place; Open Class; Finalist
1980	Theme from The Cowboys by John Williams / Shenandoah (Traditional) / Turkey in the Straw (Traditional) / Central Park by Chick Corea / The Ecstasy of Gold by Ennio Morricone / Ghost Riders in the Sky by Stan Jones	76.65	14th Place; Open Class
1981	Theme from The Cowboys by John Williams / Turkey in the Straw (Traditional) / Central Park by Chick Corea / En Sueno by Albert Kunzelmann / Shenandoah (Traditional) / Battle Hymn of the Republic by William Steffe & Julia Ward Howe	78.10	12th Place; Open Class; Finalist
1982	Wabash Cannonball (Traditional) / En Sueno by Albert Kunzelmann / Shenandoah (Traditional) / Battle Hymn of the Republic by William Steffe & Julia Ward Howe	77.60	14th Place; Open Class
1983	25th Anniversary; Ghost Riders in the Sky by Stan Jones / Battle Hymn of the Republic by William Steffe & Julia Ward Howe / Pops Hoedown by Richard Hayman / It Was a Very Good Year by Ervin Drake / How the West Was Won by Alfred Newman	76.85	15th Place; Open Class; Semifinalist
1984	Battle Hymn of the Republic by William Steffe & Julia Ward Howe / Ghost Riders in the Sky by Stan Jones / High Noon by Dimitri Tiomkin & Ned Washington / The Aggie Song (from The Best Little Whorehouse in Texas) by Carol Hall	85.20	13th Place; Open Class; Semifinalist
1985	Symphonic Dance No. 3 - Fiesta by Clifton Williams / Third Symphony, Buckaroo Holiday (from Rodeo) & The Red Pony by Aaron Copland	86.70	9th Place; Open Class; Finalist
1986	American Salute by Morton Gould / Silverado by Bruce Broughton / Prayer of Thanksgiving (Traditional) / The Red Pony by Aaron Copland / Battle Hymn of the Republic by William Steffe & Julia Ward Howe	83.50	11th Place; Open Class; Finalist
1987	He's Gone Away (Traditional) / American Overture for Band by Joseph Willcox Jenkins / Third Symphony by Aaron Copland / When Johnny Comes Marching Home by Louis Lambert (Patrick Sarsfield Gilmore)	81.00	17th Place; Open Class; Semifinalist
1988	Magnificent Seven by Elmer Bernstein / Corral Nocturne & Hoedown (from Rodeo) by Aaron Copland / Silverado by Bruce Broughton	77.80	19th Place; Open Class; Semifinalist
1989	How the West Was Won; How the West Was Won, Cheyennes & No Goodbyes by Lionel Newman / Bound for the Promised Land by Ken Darby & Robert Emmett Dolan	78.00	18th Place; Open Class
1990	Music for the Centennial of the State of Wyoming; How the West Was Won by Alfred Newman / Silverado by Bruce Broughton / Pop's Hoedown by Richard Hayman / Shenandoah (Traditional) / America the Beautiful by Samuel A. Ward & Katharine Lee Bates	80.25	17th Place; Open Class; Semifinalist
1991	The Cowboys from Sunset / Lonesome Dove by Basil Poledouris / Oklahoma Crude by Henry Mancini / "Orange Blossom Special" by Ervin T. Rouse / Music from Dances With Wolves by John Barry / America the Beautiful by Samuel A. Ward & Katharine Lee Bates	74.90	21st Place; Open Class
1992	A Western Odyssey; Flag of Stars by Gordon Jacob / Cool, Clear Water by Bob Nolan / "Unsquare Dance" by Dave Brubeck / The Ecstasy of Gold by Ennio Morricone / Ghost Riders in the Sky by Stan Jones	76.10	19th Place; Division I
1993	The Last Crossing: East Moves West; Ashokan Farewell by Jay Ungar / Cheyennes (from How the West Was Won) by Alfred Newman / Western Overture by Thom Ritter George / Charles County Overture by Joseph Willcox Jenkins / Battle Hymn of the Republic by William Steffe & Julia Ward Howe	77.10	19th Place; Division I
1994	Southwestern Sketches; Sunrise by Fred Taylor / Scherzo by John Cheetham / Santa Fe Saga by Morton Gould / Symphonic Dance No. 3 - Fiesta by Clifton Williams	81.60	14th Place; Division I Semifinalist
1995	A Copland Canvas; Third Symphony, Mvt. 4; Fanfare for the Common Man & Appalachian Spring by Aaron Copland	80.70	14th Place; Division I Semifinalist
1996	American Jubilee; The Wind and The Lion by Jerry Goldsmith / Shenandoah (Traditional) / Outdoor Overture by Aaron Copland / Camptown Races by Stephen Foster	74.40	19th Place; Division I
1997	American Salute by Morton Gould / The Way West by Bronisław Kaper / Magnificent Seven by Elmer Bernstein / America the Beautiful by Samuel A. Ward & Katharine Lee Bates	68.00	20th Place; Division I
1998	Forging a Frontier; The Getaway (from Silverado), The Family (from Tombstone) & McKendrick Attack (from Silverado) by Bruce Broughton / Ghost Riders in the Sky by Stan Jones	68.60	24th Place; Division I
1999	Billy the Kid; Billy the Kid by Aaron Copland	73.80	21st Place; Division I
2000	Symphony of Freedom; America the Beautiful by Samuel A. Ward & Katharine Lee Bates / America's Struggle (Original) / America (from West Side Story) by Leonard Bernstein & Stephen Sondheim / Amazing Grace by John Newton, adapted by William Walker / Stars and Stripes Forever by John Philip Sousa	73.65	19th Place; Division I
2001	Tribute to An Uncommon Man; Outdoor Overture, El Salon Mexico & Down a Country Lane by Aaron Copland / Chorale & Shaker Dance by John Zdechlik	76.20	19th Place; Division I
2002	Red, White and Blue; Javelin by Michael Torke / American Elegy by Frank Ticheli / Into the Storm (from Stormworks) by Stephen Melillo	75.55	21st Place; Division I
2003	Reflections of the Blue and Gray; The Great Locomotive Chase by Robert W. Smith / Gently Flows the Amber Grain by Brian Scott / Battle Music by David Holsinger / Masque by Kenneth Hesketh	75.45	22nd Place; Division I
2004	The Troopers Are Coming; Carriage of the Spirits & The Chase (from The Good, the Bad and the Ugly) by Ennio Morricone / America the Beautiful by Samuel A. Ward & Katharine Lee Bates / Shenandoah (Traditional) / Finishing It by Bruce Broughton / Down in the Valley (Traditional) / Rodeo by Paul Hart / Houston by David Benoit / Ghost Riders in the Sky by Stan Jones / Magnificent Seven by Elmer Bernstein / Taps by Daniel Butterfield	74.925	23rd Place; Division I
2005	Gold Rush; The Gates of Gold (for Violin and Orchestra) by Joseph Curiale / Death by Triple Fiddle by Sam Bush & Mike Marshall / She'll Be Comin' Round The Mountain (Traditional)	71.675	22nd Place; Division I
2006	Corps inactive		
2007	Awakening; Joy (from Awakening) by Joseph Curiale / "Unsquare Dance" by Dave Brubeck / Ever Braver, Ever Stronger by Gordon Goodwin / American Faces by David Holsinger	77.55	20th Place; Division I
2008	Iron Horse Express; Ghost Riders in the Sky by Stan Jones / Canyon of Heroes by Sean O'Loughlin / The Ghost Train Triptych by Eric Whitacre / Sasparilla by John Mackey / Song of the Gandy Dancers by Richard Saucedo / The Great Revival by William Gordon	81.10	16th Place; World Class; Semifinalist
2009	Western Side Story; Cave by Russell Peck / Maria & Somewhere (from West Side Story) by Leonard Bernstein and Stephen Sondheim / Adelina de Maya by Joseph Curiale / America (from West Side Story) by Leonard Bernstein & Stephen Sondheim / Spaghetti Western by Michael Daugherty / One Hand, One Heart (from West Side Story) by Leonard Bernstein & Stephen Sondheim / Pentium by Peter Graham / West Side Story Reprise by Leonard Bernstein & Stephen Sondheim	85.10	12th Place; World Class; Finalist
2010	Wanted; Wanted Dead or Alive by Jon Bon Jovi & Richie Sambora / Trittico by Václav Nelhýbel / Proven Lands (from There Will Be Blood) by Jonny Greenwood / Suite from Our Town by Aaron Copland / Borinage by Michael Gordon / Journey to the Center of the Earth by Peter Graham / Night Flight (from Swing Shift) by Kenji Bunch	83.35	15th Place; World Class; Semifinalist
2011	The Road Home; The Old Church by Stephen Paulus / China Gates by John Adams / Memory (from Nepomuk's Dances, Mvt. 3) by Marcelo Zarvos / Muted and Sensuous (from Four Piano Blues) by Aaron Copland / Mama by Edgar Meyer	83.20	14th Place; World Class; Semifinalist
2012	This Was the Future; Galop from Souvenirs, Op. 28 by Samuel Barber / Music for Theater & The Heiress by Aaron Copland	77.65	18th Place; World Class; Semifinalist
2013	Magnificent 11; Fanfare for the 11th by Robert W. Smith / Theme from The Magnificent Seven by Elmer Bernstein / John Dunbar's Theme (from Dances with Wolves) by John Barry / Tribal Spirits by Paul Rennick / Battle Hymn of the Republic by William Steffe & Julia Ward Howe	86.05	13th Place; World Class; Semifinalist
2014	A People's House; A People's House by Robert W. Smith / The Ramparts by Clifton Williams / Distant Images by Sandi & Paul Rennick / Lincoln by Robert W. Smith / Oh Shenandoah (Traditional) / America the Beautiful by Samuel A. Ward & Katharine Lee Bates	84.775	14th Place; World Class; Semifinalist
2015	Wild Horses; Dreamer by John Debney / Open Spaces by Robert W. Smith / Wild Horses by Natasha Bedingfield, Andrew Frampton & Wayne Wilkins / Adrenaline City by Adam Gorb	83.800	13th Place; World Class; Semifinalist
2016	Hero; Fanfare & Fire by Robert W. Smith / War Psalm by Paul Rennick / Walking with Heroes by Paul Lovatt-Cooper / Symphony No. 1, Mvt. 1 by John Corigliano / Fix You by Chris Martin, Jonny Buckland, Guy Berryman & Will Champion (Coldplay)	83.275	14th Place; World Class; Semifinalist
2017	Duels & Duets; Part I – The Foe – Romeo and Juliet by Sergei Prokofiev; Part II – The Friend – Romeo and Juliet by Sergei Prokofiev; Part III – The Lover – Black Heart Tango by Robert W. Smith & Paul Rennick / Nessun Dorma by Giacomo Puccini; Part IV – The Foil – The Foil by Robert W. Smith	81.275	17th Place; World Class; Semifinalist
2018	The New Road West; Welcome to the Black Parade by Bob Bryar, Frank Iero, Ray Toro, Gerard Way & Mikey Way (My Chemical Romance) / Toward The Splendid City by Richard Danielpour / Canyon Echoes by Robert W. Smith / Both Sides Now by Joni Mitchell / New Road West by Robert W. Smith	81.787	17th Place; World Class; Semifinalist
2019	Beyond Boundaries; Divertimento for Band, Opus 42 by Vincent Persichetti / Enterprising Young Men (from Star Trek) by Michael Giacchino / Wondrous Light by John Estacio / To The Stars by Randy Edelman / Chorale VI Cantus – Song of Aeolus by Karl Jenkins / Main title, Krill Attack & Shuttle Escape (from The Orville) by Bruce Broughton	81.663	18th Place; World Class; Semifinalist
2020	Season canceled due to the COVID-19 pandemic		
2021	Unleashed; The Triumph of Time by Peter Graham / Knockin' on Heaven's Door by Bob Dylan / Eclipse by Roger Waters, Nick Mason, Richard Wright & David Gilmour (Pink Floyd)	No scored competitions	
2022	VorAcious; When Johnny Comes Marching Home by Louis Lambert (Patrick Sarsfield Gilmore) / Without Warning by Stephen Melillo / The Ecstasy of Gold by Ennio Morricone / Nothing Else Matters by James Hetfield & Lars Ulrich / Dance of the Earth by Igor Stravinsky / Original music by Tim Snyder & Paul Rennick	86.425	12th Place; World Class; Finalist
2023	To Lasso the Sun; L’ultima diligenza di Red Rock (from The Hateful Eight) by Ennio Morricone / Harrison's Dream by Peter Graham / Jesu, meine Freude by Johann Sebastian Bach / Theme (from Once Upon a Time in the West) by Ennio Morricone / As if a Voice Were in Them by Oliver Waespi / Final Duel (from Once Upon a Time in the West) by Ennio Morricone	89.475	10th Place; World Class; Finalist
2024	Dance with the Devil; The Other Side by Tim Snyder, Paul Rennick & Justin Shelton / Hyperlink by Peter Graham / House Of The Rising Sun by The Animals / Don't Let Me Be Misunderstood (from Kill Bill: Volume 1) by Santa Esmeralda / Wait Of The World by Stephen Melillo	88.950	10th Place; World Class; Finalist
2025	The Final Sunset; Original music by Paul and Sandi Rennick / Embarking and Setting Sail by Thomas Bergersen / Many Mothers (from Mad Max: Fury Road) by Junkie XL / In This Heart by Sinéad O'Connor / Funeral for a Friend by Elton John / Symphony No. 2 in C Minor by Gustav Mahler	90.050	10th Place; World Class; Finalist
2026	Into Darkness; War Pigs by Black Sabbath / Ride of the Valkyries by Richard Wagner / Medea: Dance of Vengeance by Samuel Barber / The Night Window by Thomas Newman / Extreme Prejudice by Tim Snyder / Several Species of Small Furry Animals Gathered Together in a Cave and Grooving with a Pict by Roger Waters and Pink Floyd / Adagio for Strings by Samuel Barber	86.950	11th Place; World Class; Finalist
2027	America's Core		

== Caption awards ==
At the annual World Championship Finals, Drum Corps International presents awards to the corps with the high average scores from prelims, semifinals, and finals in five captions. Prior to 2000 and the adoption of the current scoring format, the Troopers have won these captions:

High Visual Award

- 1972, 1973, 1974

High Color Guard Award

- 1973
