= Ricky Sharpe =

Ricky Sharpe may refer to:

- Ricky Sharpe (Home and Away), a character from the soap opera Home and Away
- Ricky Sharpe (American football) (born 1980), Arena Football League player
