= River City Rhythm Drum and Bugle Corps =

Open Class competitive junior drum and bugle corps

- Location: Anoka, Minnesota
- Division: Open Class
- Founded: 2009/2014
- Executive Director: Beau Hansen
- Corps Director: Jordon Pinchback
- Website: rivercityrhythm.org

The River City Rhythm Drum and Bugle Corps is an Open Class competitive junior drum and bugle corps, based in Anoka, Minnesota. River City Rhythm performs in Drum Corps International (DCI) competitions.

== History ==
River City Rhythm began as a competitive drumline, founded in Big Lake, Minnesota, in 2009 to compete in the Minnesota Percussion Association (MPA) and Winter Guard International (WGI). The unit has won the MPA Independent A Class Championship in 2010–11 and the MPA Independent Open Class Championship in 2013–16 and 2018–19. They have been WGI Independent A Class World Champion Finalists in 2010–11, WGI Independent Open Class World Champion Finalists in 2012–16, and named WGI Independent Open Class Fan Favorites in 2012–15.

The organization relocated to Champlin, Minnesota in the Minneapolis–Saint Paul area during the winter of 2011-12.

In 2014, the organization announced its intent to field a drum and bugle corps to compete in Drum Corps International (DCI) beginning in 2015. While the management was laying the groundwork for starting a new corps, the drumline was one of seventeen that took part in the DrumLine Battle competition in Indianapolis during the 2014 DCI World Championships. In January 2015, DCI announced that River City Rhythm was one of five corps being evaluated for possible inclusion in DCI Open Class competition for 2015. In May 2015, following a period of evaluation of the unit's finances, staffing, and tour plans by DCI's staff, River City Rhythm was added to the list of competing Open Class corps. The corps was added to DCI's summer schedule for four shows in Minnesota and Iowa in preparation for the corps' first appearance at the DCI Open Class World Championship Prelims in Michigan City, Indiana.

== Sponsorship ==
River City Rhythm is a 501 (c)(3) musical organization. The organization is the sponsor of the River City Rhythm Drum and Bugle Corps, the River City Rhythm Indoor Drumline, the River City Rhythm Winter Guard, and the River City Rhythm Indoor Winds. Beau Hansen is the Executive Assistant and Jordon Pinchback is the Corps Director.

== Show summary (2015–2026) ==
Source=

Key
Light blue background indicates DCI Open Class Finalist

Year	Repertoire	World Championships	
Year	Repertoire	Score	Placement
2015	And the River Flows On; The River Flows Through You by Yiruma / The River by Seth Adams / Shenandoah (Traditional) / The Water is Wide (Traditional) / Wait/Fantasy by Anthony Gonzales, Justin Meldal-Johnsen, Yann Gonzales, Morgan Kibby & Brad Laner (M83), adapted by Chanticleer	67.425	9th Place; Open Class; Finalist
2015	And the River Flows On; The River Flows Through You by Yiruma / The River by Seth Adams / Shenandoah (Traditional) / The Water is Wide (Traditional) / Wait/Fantasy by Anthony Gonzales, Justin Meldal-Johnsen, Yann Gonzales, Morgan Kibby & Brad Laner (M83), adapted by Chanticleer	62.450	31st Place; World Class
2016	Shimmer; Harmonielehre by John Adams / Firefly by Ryan George / Symphony for Winds and Percussion by Donald Grantham	63.600	12th Place; Open Class; Finalist
2016	Shimmer; Harmonielehre by John Adams / Firefly by Ryan George / Symphony for Winds and Percussion by Donald Grantham	63.525	34th Place; World Class
2017	Misshapen; Ode to Joy by Ludwig van Beethoven / Smells Like Teen Spirit by Kurt Cobain, Krist Novoselic & Dave Grohl / Misshapen by Chad Friesleben	67.688	11th Place; Open Class; Finalist
2017	Misshapen; Ode to Joy by Ludwig van Beethoven / Smells Like Teen Spirit by Kurt Cobain, Krist Novoselic & Dave Grohl / Misshapen by Chad Friesleben	65.700	35th Place; World Class
2018	Each Hour Wounds; The Hours - Dead Things by Philip Glass / Somewhere in Time by John Barry / Each Hour Wounds by Chad Friesleben, Bojan Hoover & Paul Weber	70.750	9th Place; Open Class; Finalist
2018	Each Hour Wounds; The Hours - Dead Things by Philip Glass / Somewhere in Time by John Barry / Each Hour Wounds by Chad Friesleben, Bojan Hoover & Paul Weber	68.425	32nd Place; World Class
2019	Breaking the News; The Typewriter by Leroy Anderson / Second Rhapsody by George Gershwin / A Day in the Life by John Lennon and Paul McCartney / Breaking the News by Chad Friesleben, Bojan Hoover, Paul Weber & Craig Myers	73.300	8th Place; Open Class; Finalist
2019	Breaking the News; The Typewriter by Leroy Anderson / Second Rhapsody by George Gershwin / A Day in the Life by John Lennon and Paul McCartney / Breaking the News by Chad Friesleben, Bojan Hoover, Paul Weber & Craig Myers	71.075	28th Place; World Class
2020	Season canceled due to the COVID-19 pandemic		
2021	Coming to a Town Near You; Being For The Benefit of Mr. Kite! by Lennon–McCartney / Clowns by Philip Parker / Blinding Lights by Abel Tesfaye, Ahmad Balshe, Jason Quenneville, Max Martin & Oscar Holter (The Weeknd)	No scored competitions	
2022	Road To Nowhere; Udacrep Akubrad by Avner Dorman / Road to Nowhere by Ward Miller, Craig Myers & Paul Weber / Putza by Jan Van der Roost	73.225	10th Place; Open Class; Finalist
2022	Road To Nowhere; Udacrep Akubrad by Avner Dorman / Road to Nowhere by Ward Miller, Craig Myers & Paul Weber / Putza by Jan Van der Roost	69.950	31st Place; World Class
2023	Falling; Such Great Heights by Ben Gibbard & Jimmy Tamborello / Balancing Act by Ward Miller, Bojan Hoover & Paul Weber / Can't Help Falling in Love by Elvis Presley / New Born by Matt Bellamy	71.775	7th Place; Open Class; Finalist
2023	Falling; Such Great Heights by Ben Gibbard & Jimmy Tamborello / Balancing Act by Ward Miller, Bojan Hoover & Paul Weber / Can't Help Falling in Love by Elvis Presley / New Born by Matt Bellamy	71.175	28th Place; World Class
2024	Mine! 31' Depression Blues by Ed Sturgill / Exile By Taylor Swift, Joe Alwyn, & Justin Vernon (Bon Iver)/ Price Tag by Jessie J, Dr. Luke, Claude Kelly, & B.o.B.	76.675	6th Place; Open Class; Finalist
2024	Mine! 31' Depression Blues by Ed Sturgill / Exile By Taylor Swift, Joe Alwyn, & Justin Vernon (Bon Iver)/ Price Tag by Jessie J, Dr. Luke, Claude Kelly, & B.o.B.	74.075	27th Place; World Class
2025	Winds of Change; Blowin' in the Wind by Bob Dylan / The Times They Are a-Changin' by Bob Dylan / Hurricane by Bob Dylan / When the Ship Comes In by Bob Dylan / Make You Feel My Love by Bob Dylan	76.300	5th Place; Open Class; Finalist
2025	Winds of Change; Blowin' in the Wind by Bob Dylan / The Times They Are a-Changin' by Bob Dylan / Hurricane by Bob Dylan / When the Ship Comes In by Bob Dylan / Make You Feel My Love by Bob Dylan	73.125	26th Place; World Class Semifinalist
2026	Within These Walls; Hurt by Trent Reznor / Lux Aeterna by Clint Mansell / The Frozen Cathedral by John Mackey	76.675	5th Place; Open Class; Finalist
2026	Within These Walls; Hurt by Trent Reznor / Lux Aeterna by Clint Mansell / The Frozen Cathedral by John Mackey	73.900	25th Place; World Class Semifinalist
