= Madison Scouts Drum and Bugle Corps =

Junior drum and bugle corps based in Madison, Wisconsin

- Former name: Madison Explorers
- Location: Madison, Wisconsin
- Division: World Class
- Founded: 1920
- Executive Director: Chris Komnick
- Corps Director: David Lofy
- Championship titles: CYO: 1974; 1975; VFW: 1990; DCI: 1975; 1988
- Website: www.madisonscouts.org

The Madison Scouts Drum and Bugle Corps is a World Class competitive junior drum and bugle corps based in Madison, Wisconsin. The Madison Scouts are one of the thirteen founding member corps of Drum Corps International (DCI) and a two-time DCI World Champion. The Madison Scouts are currently the oldest continuously active junior corps.

Until 2018, they had remained one of only two all-male corps alongside The Cavaliers Drum and Bugle Corps. In 2019, the Madison Scouts adopted a non-discrimination policy that expanded membership for all gender identities to participate in the Madison Scouts, making the corps co-ed.

== History ==
The corps originated on December 3, 1920 under the direction of Lewis Kessler and maintained an active performance schedule through the end of 1925.

Leadership changes in the Council combined with flagging participation in Scouting resulted in the corps activity being paused in the fall of 1925. Attempts were made in 1928 and 1930 to restart the corps but to no avail, likely hampered by the Great Depression. A revitalization of the Council began in 1935, which saw the return of Lewis Kessler's involvement.

In October 1937, the Four Lakes Council began to actively recruit members to restart the corps. The 1938 revival would have E. J. Hess as its director and Clarence H. Beebe as the corps' director, a position he would hold for thirty years until his death in 1968. The advisory committee to guide the musical unit included none other than Lewis Kessler, the original corps director.

In its early days, the corps performed concerts and appeared in many local parades. During World War II, the corps participated in war bond rallies. The corps was split in 1951, with the older members becoming the Madison Explorer Scouts and the younger assigned to the Madison Junior Scouts, a cadet feeder corps for the older unit.

In 1954, the Explorer Scouts entered field competitions and, in their first national competition, finished second at the VFW Nationals in Philadelphia. They repeated as runners-up in 1955. In 1956, they attended the American Legion Nationals in Los Angeles and again placed second. They were then finalists at VFW Nationals from 1957 through 1962 and made American Legion Finals in 1958 and 1959. In 1969, Bill Howard became corps director.

In 1971, at the urging of Cavaliers founder Don Warren and Troopers founder Jim Jones, the Blue Stars, Cavaliers, Madison Scouts, Santa Clara Vanguard, and Troopers formed the Midwest Combine. This was in reaction to the rigid, inflexible rules of the American Legion and VFW (the primary rule makers and sponsors of both corps and shows), and the low or nonexistent performance fees paid for appearing in the various competitions. The corps felt that the existing competitive circuits stifled creativity and starved corps financially. (A similar group of Eastern corps, the United Organization of Junior Corps, also known as the Alliance, was formed by the 27th Lancers, Garfield Cadets, Boston Crusaders, Blessed Sacrament Golden Knights, and Blue Rock.) The Combine members believed that member corps should be able to make their own rules, operate their own competitions and championships, and keep the bulk of the monies earned. For the 1971 season, the corps stuck together, offering show promoters the five corps as a package. Despite pressure on show sponsors, judges, and other drum corps, the Combine corps booked into a number of shows together.

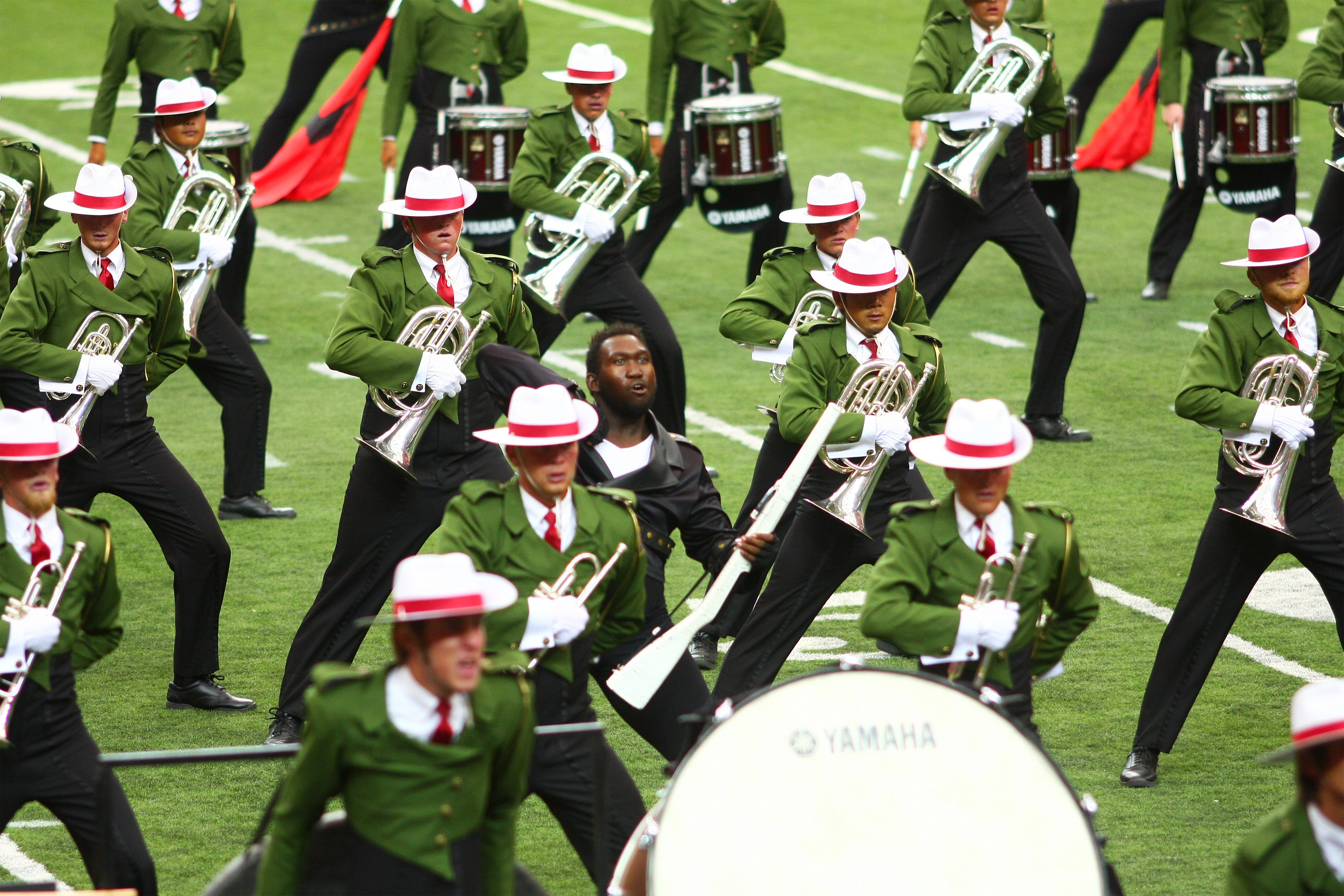
The Madison Scouts in 2008

In 1972, all ten corps from the Midwest Combine and the Alliance—plus the Anaheim Kingsmen, Argonne Rebels, and De La Salle Oaklands—became founding members of Drum Corps International, which remains the sanctioning body for junior corps in North America. At the first DCI World Championships in Whitewater, Wisconsin, the Scouts finished in fourteenth in a competition that featured thirty-nine corps from the East, the South, the West Coast, the Midwest and Great Plains, and Canada. In 1973, the Scouts rose all the way up to fourth place. The following year they were DCI runners-up, and in Philadelphia in 1975, the Madison Scouts became the third corps to win the DCI World Championship.

In 1980, after sixteen previous appearances and ten prior Finals, the Madison Scouts tied for 1st place with The Cavaliers at VFW Nationals in Chicago. At this time the corps started working towards composing the entire staff with Scouts alumni, with Bill Howard stepping down and being replaced by Scott Stewart as corps director.

In June 1988, the Madison Scouts went to Europe as part of their fiftieth-anniversary celebration. They presented clinics and performed in exhibition at contests that included all of the corps from Great Britain, the Netherlands, and Germany. That year, they also won their second DCI World Championship.

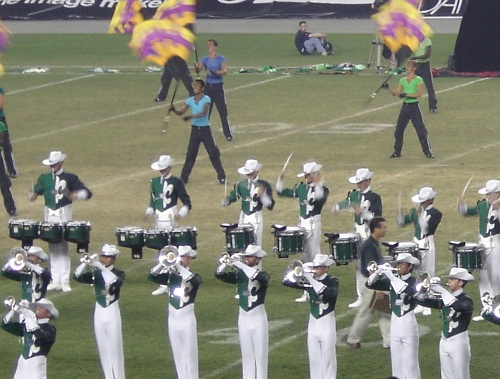
The Madison Scouts in 2005

In 1990, the organization dropped the name Scouts from the corporate name and allowed the charter for Boy Scout Troop 600 to lapse, although the corps remained affiliated with Scouting. In 1995, the Junior Scouts merged with the CapitolAires Drum and Bugle Corps, an all-girl corps from Madison. The resulting co-ed Capital Sound Drum and Bugle Corps would operate under the Madison Scouts organization. Southwind Drum and Bugle Corps was also brought into the organization in 1997, relocating from Montgomery, Alabama to Lexington, Kentucky. Southwind departed the organization ten years later in 2007.

Since 2017, the organization has also sponsored Mad Brass, a marching band competing in the SoundSport division. In 2018, the organization added Fleurish Winds, a co-ed ensemble that competes in WGI Winds. In 2024, the corps made an appearance in the DCI World Championships Finals, marking not only their first appearance in finals since 2017, but also the first time that women appeared in finals with the Madison Scouts as the corps became co-ed in 2019.

=== Madison city flag ===
Corps members Rick and Dennis Stone, assisted by color guard instructor John Fries, designed a flag for the corps color guard to carry as a flag for the City of Madison, which did not have a city flag. On April 12, 1962, the Madison City Council approved a resolution adopting this flag as the official flag of the city of Madison. In 2007, to honor the Madison Scouts' seventieth anniversary and the forty-fifth anniversary of its adoption as the city flag, the City of Madison presented a flag to the corps, which the Scouts continue to carry on tour.

== Show summary (1972–2026) ==
Key
Pale green background indicates DCI World Class Semifinalist (Note: From 1972-1991, the Madison Scouts competed in Open Class; from 1992-2007 in Division I, and since 2008 in World Class. These are the same tier, just renamed.)
Pale blue background indicates DCI World Class Finalist
Dark gold background indicates DCI World Class Champion

Year	Repertoire	World Championships	
Year	Repertoire	Score	Placement
1972		77.45	14th Place; Open Class
1973	Ballet in Brass by Vic Schoen / Bajour by Walter Marks & Ernest Kinoy / God Bless the Child by Billie Holiday & Arthur Herzog Jr. / Brian's Song by Michel Legrand, Alan Bergman & Marilyn Bergman Howe]] /]]	83.55	4th Place; Open Class; Finalist
1974	Ballet in Brass by Vic Schoen / Bond Street by Benjamin Frankel / God Bless the Child by Billie Holiday & Arthur Herzog Jr. / Slaughter on 10th Avenue (from On Your Toes) by Richard Rodgers / Brian's Song by Michel Legrand, Alan Bergman & Marilyn Bergman	88.85	2nd Place; Open Class; Finalist
1975	Slaughter on 10th Avenue (from On Your Toes) by Richard Rodgers / MacArthur Park by Jimmy Webb / Rhapsody in Blue by George Gershwin / Dueling Banjos by Arthur "Guitar Boogie" Smith / The Way We Were by Marvin Hamlisch, Alan Bergman & Marilyn Bergman	92.50	1st Place; Open Class; Champion
1976	Stars and Stripes Forever by John Philip Sousa / MacArthur Park by Jimmy Webb / Rhapsody in Blue by George Gershwin /The Wiz by Fred Sanford]] / The Way We Were by Marvin Hamlisch, Alan Bergman & Marilyn Bergman	90.70	2nd Place; Open Class; Finalist
1977	New York, New York (from On the Town) & Selections from West Side Story by Leonard Bernstein	87.30	5th Place; Open Class; Finalist
1978	Malaguena by Ernesto Lecuona / God Bless the Child by Billie Holiday & Arthur Herzog Jr. / Main Theme, Ben's Theme, Princess Leia's Theme, The Last Battle & The Coronation (all from Star Wars) by John Williams / How Deep is Your Love? by Barry, Robin & Maurice Gibb (The Bee Gees)	89.55	4th Place; Open Class; Finalist
1979	The Sorcerer and the Latin by Vic Schoen / Bohemian Rhapsody by Freddie Mercury / Granada Smoothie by Mark Taylor / Pieces of Dreams by Michel Legrand	84.50	8th Place; Open Class; Finalist
1980	They're Playing Our Song by Marvin Hamlisch & Carole Bayer Sager / Malagueña by Ernesto Lecuona / New Country by Jean-Luc Ponty / Through the Eyes of Love (from Ice Castles) by Marvin Hamlisch & Carole Bayer Sager	87.05	6th Place; Open Class; Finalist
1981	Numero Uno by Louie Bellson / Malagueña by Ernesto Lecuona / Down Wind by Pierre Moerlen / Through the Eyes of Love (from Ice Castles) by Marvin Hamlisch & Carole Bayer Sager	92.60	3rd Place; Open Class; Finalist
1982	Slaughter on 10th Avenue (from On Your Toes) by Richard Rodgers / Strawberry Soup by Don Ellis / Downwind by Pierre Moerlen / Through the Eyes of Love (from Ice Castles) by Marvin Hamlisch & Carole Bayer Sager	90.75	5th Place; Open Class; Finalist
1983	Colas Breugnon Overture by Dmitry Kabalevsky / Strawberry Soup by Don Ellis / Calico & Memory (from Cats) by Andrew Lloyd Webber	86.45	5th Place; Open Class; Finalist
1984	Ballet in Brass by Vic Schoen / Waltz of the Mushroom Hunters by Greg Hopkins / Calico & Memory (from Cats) by Andrew Lloyd Webber	94.60	5th Place; Open Class; Finalist
1985	Four Score and Seven & Ballet In Brass by Vic Schoen / Rhapsody in Blue by George Gershwin	95.00	4th Place; Open Class; Finalist
1986	Alex's Rag by Whistlin' Alex Moore / Harlem Suite by Duke Ellington / Starlight Express by Andrew Lloyd Webber	91.3	7th Place; Open Class; Finalist
1987	Captain from Castile by Alfred Newman / An American In Paris by George Gershwin / Stars and Stripes Forever by John Philip Sousa	90.40	6th Place; Open Class; Finalist
1988	Plymouth Hoe-Down (from Concerto For Guitar and Jazz Orchestra) by Paul Hart / Malagueña by Ernesto Lecuona	97.10	1st Place; Open Class; Champion
1989	Make His Praise Glorious by Bill and Robin Wolaver / Slaughter on 10th Avenue (from On Your Toes) by Richard Rodgers	93.60	7th Place; Open Class; Finalist
1990	Undiscovered Madison; The Lemon Squeeze by Mark Kirk / Remembrance by Paul Hart / I Can Cook Too (from On the Town) by Leonard Bernstein	88.70	9th Place; Open Class; Finalist
1991	City of Angels; Prologue and Theme, With Every Breath I Take, Alaura's Theme, Funny & I'm Nothing Without You; All from City of Angels by Cy Coleman	92.0	7th Place; Open Class; Finalist
1992	City of Angels; Prologue and Theme, L.A. Blues, You Gotta Look Out for Yourself, With Every Breath I Take & Funny; All from City of Angels by Cy Coleman	93.70	5th Place; Division I Finalist
1993	Reflection and Evolution; Numero Uno by Louie Bellson / Strawberry Soup by Don Ellis / Encore by Scott Boerma & Taras Nahirniak	91.90	6th Place; Division I Finalist
1994	Santos by Louie Bellson / Cuban Overture by George Gershwin / Malaga by Bill Holman	92.20	6th Place; Division I Finalist
1995	A Drum Corps Fan's Dream: A Day in the Life of a Bull Fighter; El Toro Caliente by Scott Boerma / Concierto de Aranjuez by Joaquín Rodrigo / La Danza Pasillo by Taras Nahirniak & Jeff Moore / Malaga by Bill Holman	95.40	4th Place; Division I Finalist
1996	A Drum Corps Fan's Dream: Part Dos; A Mis Abuelos by Arturo Sandoval / Bolero by Maurice Ravel / En Fuego (On Fire) by Michel Camilo / Malagueña by Ernesto Lecuona	91.50	6th Place; Division I Finalist
1997	The Pirates of Lake Mendota; The Adventure Begins by Scott Boerma / A Day in Port (Songs of the Quay) by Goff Richards / Moods of the Sea (based on Tall Ships Suite) by David Royalance / Confrontation and Finale by Taras Nahirniak	93.90	5th Place; Division I Finalist
1998	Power, Pizazz, and All That Jazz! Lupin by Yuji Ohno / Swingin' Peter... Sweet & Hall of the Mountain King (from Peer Gynt Suite No. 1) by Edvard Grieg / Remembrance by Paul Hart	91.90	6th Place; Division I Finalist
1999	Selections from Jesus Christ Superstar; I Don't Know How to Love Him, Heaven on Their Minds, Everything's All Right, King Herod's Song, Trial and Crucifixion, John 19:41 & Superstar; All from Jesus Christ Superstar by Andrew Lloyd Webber & Tim Rice	93.40	6th Place; Division I Finalist
2000	The Cossack Brotherhood; The Gadfly – Finale by Dmitri Shostakovich / Meadowland (Traditional) / Ballet Suite No. 1 – Galop by Dmitri Shostakovich / Gopak (from Gayane) & Masquerade – Romance by Aram Khachaturian / Taras Bulba – Overture by Franz Waxman	85.50	10th Place; Division I Finalist
2001	Hot Jazz - Madison Style; The Fire and the Flame; Oh, Those Martian Blues; Symphonie Pour L'Orchestre Americain; Ballet In Brass; All by Vic Schoen	86.55	11th Place; Division I Finalist
2002	Conquest; Captain from Castile by Alfred Newman / Asturias by Isaac Albéniz / Conquistador by Jay Chattaway / Conquistadores by Jim Centorino / Save El Dorado (from The Road to El Dorado) by Hans Zimmer	84.85	14th Place; Division I Semifinalist
2003	GOLD, GREEN AND RED: The Music of Benoit Jutras; Jardin Chinois, Distorted (from La Nouba), Atmadja, Urban, Rêve Rouge & Incantation (from Quidam); All by Benoit Jutras	89.55	8th Place; Division I Finalist
2004	MadiSonic; Sound Piece for Jazz Orchestra by Oliver Nelson / Malaga by Bill Holman	91.175	8th Place; Division I Finalist
2005	The Carmen Project; Carmen by Georges Bizet / The Carmen Project by Georges Bizet, Scott Boerma & Colin McNutt / Bolero by Maurice Ravel / Copacabana by Jack Feldman, Barry Manilow & Bruce Sussman / Malagueña by Ernesto Lecuona / Mambo & Rumble (from West Side Story) by Leonard Bernstein & Stephen Sondheim	92.625	6th Place; Division I Finalist
2006	Primal Forces; Feast Day In Seville by Isaac Albéniz / Harp Concerto by Alberto Ginastera / Gabriel's Oboe (from The Mission) by Ennio Morricone / Malambo (from Estancia) by Alberto Ginastera	87.70	9th Place; Division I Finalist
2007	Unbound; Uninvited by Alanis Morissette / Kashmir by Jimmy Page, Robert Plant & John Bonham / Pie Jesu (from Requiem) by Gabriel Fauré / Libertango by Astor Piazolla	81.85	15th Place; Division I Semifinalist
2008	La Noche de la Iguana - Inteligencia, Pasión, Progreso; La Noche de los Mayas by Silvestre Revueltas / Danza de los Duendes by Nancy Galbraith / Estancia Ballet & Harp Concerto by Alberto Ginastera / Danzon No. 2 by Arturo Marquez / Concierto Candela for Solo Percussion and Orchestra by Gabriela Ortiz	85.225	12th Place; World Class; Finalist
2009	El Relámpago; The Forces of Nature by Vince Oliver / Malaga by Bill Holman / Two Left-Footed Mambo – Baron Cimetiere's Mambo by Donald Grantham / Love Is in the Air by Vince Oliver / A Turn to the Dark Side – Candela by Gabriela Ortiz / Relámpago's Triumphant Return – Margariteña by Inocente Carreño	82.40	15th Place; World Class; Semifinalist
2010	Slaughter on 10th Avenue (from On Your Toes) by Richard Rodgers / Rhapsody in Blue by George Gershwin	88.95	10th Place; World Class; Finalist
2011	New York Morning; New York, New York (from On the Town) by Leonard Bernstein / Oh What a Beautiful Morning (from Oklahoma!) by Richard Rodgers & Oscar Hammerstein II / Beautiful Mourning & Requiem by Robert W. Smith / Empire State of Mind by Alicia Keys	87.55	10th Place; World Class; Finalist
2012	Reframed; Pictures at an Exhibition by Modest Mussorgsky / Malaga by Bill Holman / The Way We Were by Marvin Hamlisch, Alan Bergman & Marilyn Bergman / Through The Eyes Of Love (from Ice Castles) by Marvin Hamlisch & Carole Bayer Sager / Malagueña by Ernesto Lecuona	88.00	9th Place; World Class; Finalist
2013	Corps of Brothers - 75 Years of Survival; Call of Duty: Modern Warfare 3 by Brian Tyler / Corps of Brothers Fanfare by Robert W. Smith / Night on Bald Mountain by Modest Mussorgsky / The Battle Rages by Lee Beddis, Nick Pourcho & Robert W. Smith / Afghanistan 2025 by Jack Wall / You'll Never Walk Alone (from Carousel) by Richard Rodgers & Oscar Hammerstein II	90.10	9th Place; World Class; Finalist
2014	Time Trip - The Music of Stan Kenton and Don Ellis; Fanfare for the New by Hugo Montenegro / Passacaglia and Fugue by Allyn Ferguson / Concerto to End All Concertos by Stan Kenton / Bulgarian Bulge, Open Wide, Niner Two & Final Analysis by Don Ellis	87.575	11th Place; World Class; Finalist
2015	78th & Madison; Fanfare and Opener (from Annie) by Charles Strouse / Gotta Dance (Broadway Rhythm) & Good Morning (from Singin' in the Rain) by Nacio Herb Brown and Arthur Freed / I Got Rhythm by George Gershwin & Ira Gershwin / Moses Supposes (from Singin' in the Rain) by Roger Edens, Betty Comden & Adolph Green / The Boy Next Door (from Meet Me in St. Louis) by Hugh Martin & Ralph Blane / Traffic Jammin' (from New York Cityscape for Wind Ensemble) by Jeff Tyzik / Get Happy by Harold Arlen & Ted Koehler / Happy Days Are Here Again by Milton Ager & Jack Yellen	88.750	8th Place; World Class; Finalist
2016	Judas; Overture, Heaven on their Minds, Everything's Alright, Gethsemane, Trial before Pilate, I Don't Know How to Love Him, and Superstar (all from Jesus Christ Superstar) by Andrew Lloyd Webber & Tim Rice / Judas by Stefani Germanotta (Lady Gaga) & Nadir Al-Khayat (RedOne)	85.263	13th Place; World Class; Semifinalist
2017	The Last Man Standing; Territorial Claim: Pilentze Pee (A Birdie Sings) (Traditional) / Miraculous Mandarin by Béla Bartók; Depletion: Original Music by Nick Pourcho; O2: Original Music by Scott Boerma, Nick Pourcho & James Sparling; Hope & Despair: Original Music by Scott Boerma, Nick Pourcho & James Sparling; The Battle Within: Music for Prague 1968 by Karel Husa / Pilentze Pee Reprise (Traditional)	85.25	12th Place; World Class; Finalist
2018	Heart & Soul; You Are Variations by Steve Reich / Serenada Schizophrana by Danny Elfman / Rhyme of Taigu by Zhou Long / Shape of My Heart by Gordon Sumner (aka Sting) / Aurora Awakes by John Mackey / Ainadamar by Osvaldo Golijov / 34 Klezma by Michael League (Snarky Puppy) / End of the Game by Sting / Heart and Soul by Hoagy Carmichael & Frank Loesser	82.988	16th Place; World Class; Semifinalist
2019	Majestic; Afterburners by Chuck Naffier / Backlash (from Euneirophrenia) by Simon Dobson / 715–CRΣΣKS by Justin Vernon (Bon Iver) / Young Person's Guide to the Orchestra by Benjamin Britten / One Voice by Barry Manilow	82.138	17th Place; World Class; Semifinalist
2020	Season canceled due to the COVID-19 pandemic		
2021	Between the Lines; 24 Caprices, Opus 1, No. 24 in A Minor by Niccolo Paganini / Asturias (Leyenda) by Isaac Albéniz / Caprice No. 24 by Niccolò Paganini / Malagueña Salerosa (Traditional)	No scored competitions	
2022	Installation 85; Rubric by Philip Glass & Tyondai Braxton / Love on a Real Train by Tangerine Dream / Bangkok by Steve Vai / Star-Crossed by Dolan Sipes / As The World Caves In by Matt Maltese / 34 Klezma by Snarky Puppy / Original Music by Daniel Montoya Jr.	83.725	15th Place; World Class; Semifinalist
2023	The Sound Garden; Rusty Cage by Chris Cornell (Soundgarden) / La Mer by Claude Debussy / Hold Music by Jacob Mann / Black Hole Sun by Soundgarden / 23 Degrees North, 82 Degrees West by Bill Russo & Stan Kenton	82.988	16th Place; World Class; Semifinalist
2024	Mosaic; Unholy by Sam Smith & Kim Petras / White Rabbit by Jefferson Airplane / Asturias by Isaac Albéniz / Egyptian Danza by Al Di Meola / Momento Magico by Youn Sun Nah	87.050	12th Place; World Class; Finalist
2025	The Nature of Being; Sati by Salim–Sulaiman / Bučimiš (Bulgarian Folk) / Pyramid Song by Radiohead / I Remember by deadmau5 / Toxic by Britney Spears	85.350	14th Place; World Class; Semifinalist
2026	MadiSpin; Heat of the Day by Pat Metheny / Slip by Shubh Saran / The Windmills of Your Mind by Michel Legrand / The Summer Knows by Michel Legrand / Rumbacabre by Joachim Horsely & Camille Saint-Saëns	86.250	14th Place; World Class; Semifinalist

== Caption awards ==
At the annual World Championship Finals, Drum Corps International (DCI) presents awards to the corps with the high average scores from prelims, semifinals, and finals in five captions. The Madison Scouts have won these captions:

High General Effect Award

- 1974 (tie)

High Visual Award

- 1975, 1988

High Color Guard Award

- 1983

High Brass Award

- 1973, 1974, 1975, 1995 (3-way tie)

Additionally, DCI presented the Spirit of Disney award for "translating imagination into a fun, educational forum, using creative techniques, and delivering high entertainment value and showmanship" from 1995 to 2008. The Madison Scouts won this award in 1996, 1997, and 1999.
