= Pioneer Drum and Bugle Corps =

World Class competitive junior drum and bugle corps from Milwaukee

- Location: Milwaukee, WI
- Founded: 1961
- Championship titles: DCI Open Class; 1991; 1994; 1995
- Website: pioneer-corps.org

The Pioneer Drum and Bugle Corps was a World Class competitive junior drum and bugle corps from Milwaukee, Wisconsin. Pioneer is a former member corps of Drum Corps International (DCI).

== History ==
Pioneer traces its roots to the St. Patrick's (Catholic) parish of Milwaukee and its drum and bugle (D&B) corps, the Imperials of St. Patrick, founded in 1961. Both corps had been active in the Milwaukee area and the Midwest region, and both attended the inaugural DCI World Championship prelims in Whitewater, Wisconsin in 1972, with the Imperials of St. Patrick finishing in 19th place and the Thunderbolts in 28th.

By 1973, the Imperials were facing financial difficulties, and the Thunderbolts were having difficulty maintaining support staff, so the two corps merged. This resulted in a 150-member corps—much larger than most drum corps of that time—with financial and staff stability. Unable to decide on a better name and wearing the vastly different uniforms of both corps, the new corps was called "The Thing" during its first season. In 1974, the corps received the sponsorship of the Pioneer Container Corporation and found a name. The Thunderbolts' cadet corps continued, joined by a second "feeder" corps known as Pioneer II. After only a few years, the Thunderbolts' part of the merger departed in favor of the Thunderbolts Cadets, leaving only the Imperials' part in place, bringing about the unit's dropping the Thunderbolts' 1953 founding as its beginning.

While not initially a strong contender, Pioneer became a regular competitor in the Midwest region during the remainder of the 1970s, and in 1978, the corps was one of the founding members of Drum Corps Midwest (DCM) which was to become the premier regional circuit in North America over the next quarter century. In 1985, the primary corps went inactive, and Pioneer II began a transition into becoming Pioneer in 1986. By 1989, Pioneer had started to become a power in Class A60. In 1991, the corps won both the DCM Division III (DIII) title and the DCI Class A60 World Championship; in 1992, they won their 3rd DCM DIII championship but finished second in DCI DIII to the Mandarins.

In 1993 Pioneer moved into Division II (DII), where the corps was an immediate challenger for the championship. The corps was DCM DII champion for four consecutive years, from 1993 to 1996. In 1994, the corps went undefeated and won the DCI DII crown. They defended their DCI title in 1995, but in 1996 fell in finals to Quebec's Les Etoiles by two-tenths of a point. Pioneer moved to Division I (DI) in 1997, and has continued to compete in that division (now known as World Class), where the corps' best finish at the DCI World Championships was 16th place in 2000. Although Pioneer won the DCM DI title in 2004 and 2005, making them the only corps to win DCM titles in 3 divisions, the most prominent corps had abandoned DCM by then, and there were no other competitors for the DI titles.

In 1994, the organization was administratively dissolved by the Wisconsin Department of Financial Institutions. But in 1998, the organization was restored to good standing.

Pioneer celebrated the corps' 50th anniversary during the 2011 season.

During the 2018 season, members and staff of Pioneer sent reports to DCI and posted threads on drum corps forums regarding compliance and administrative issues. These issues included inadequate treatment for health issues and injuries sustained during the season, the organization's executive director making racist and culturally insensitive comments to the corps members as well as jokes about the holocaust, and the organization having unreliable buses with no or inadequate air conditioning during the long southern tour.

On August 16, 2018, DCI suspended Pioneer from all DCI activities while it investigated the organization. The investigation focused on the many issues reported by members and staff, as well as possible retaliation for those who spoke out against Pioneer.

On August 24, 2018, DCI decided that Pioneer would not be allowed to participate in the 2019 season as a condition of its suspension. Following the decision, Pioneer informed DCI that they would move immediately to replace the executive director and all board members of the organization.

On January 10, 2019, DCI voted to revoke Pioneer's membership in DCI. DCI stated that if Pioneer makes operational and administrative improvements, it would be eligible to reapply for open class participation as early as 2020.

On May 17, 2019, Pioneer announced that it will be hosting a weekend-only performance corps. The performance corps was started to be a foundation for Pioneer's plans to compete in WGI.

== Winter ensembles ==
On October 28, 2019, Pioneer announced that they will be hosting three different winter ensembles, which will all compete in the Winter Guard International circuit. These ensembles consist of a percussion ensemble, winds ensemble, and color guard ensemble. These winter ensembles will have show themes that stray away from being Irish, as a way for the organization to rebrand itself. The percussion ensemble will continue to field a cymbal line, as long as there are still interest and membership.

== Show summary (1973–2019) ==
Key
Light blue background indicates DCI Open Class Finalist (Note: Between 1973 and 1991, Pioneer competed in Class A or Class A60, and from 1992–1996 in Division II & III; these are the same tier, and have since been renamed Open Class.)
Goldenrod background indicates DCI Open Class Champion
Pale green background indicates DCI World Class Semifinalist (Note: From 1997–2007, Pioneer competed in Division I, and from 2008–2018 in World Class. These are the same tier, just renamed.)

| Year | Theme | Repertoire | World Championships | |
| Year | Theme | Repertoire | Score | Placement |
|---|---|---|---|---|
| 1973 | | Fanfare / Circus March / Rule Britannia by Thomas Arne & James Thomson / Skyliner by Charlie Barnet & Dale Bennett / Elijah Rock (Traditional) / Here There and Everywhere by Lennon–McCartney | 65.160 | 26th Place; Open Class |
| 1974 | | Fanfare / Elegy March by Roger Nixon / Hey Jude by Lennon–McCartney / Skyliner by Charlie Barnet & Dale Bennett / In the Mood by Wingy Manone, Joe Garland & Andy Razaf / 1812 Overture by Pyotr Ilyich Tchaikovsky | 71.100 | 22nd Place; Open Class |
| 1975 | | Alexander's Ragtime Band by Irving Berlin / Temptation by Nacio Herb Brown & Arthur Freed / In the Mood by Wingy Manone, Joe Garland & Andy Razaf / Encore in Jazz by Vic Firth / How the West Was Won by Alfred Newman / Battle Hymn of the Republic by William Steffe & Julia Ward Howe | 72.450 | 22nd Place; Open Class |
| 1976 | | Alexander's Ragtime Band by Irving Berlin / Encore in Jazz by Vic Firth / My Quiet Thoughts / El Malo by Willie Colón / Selections from Cabaret by John Kander & Fred Ebb | 71.200 | 26th Place; Open Class |
| 1977 | | Scheherazade by Nikolai Rimsky-Korsakov / Selections from Cabaret by John Kander & Fred Ebb | 65.950 | 32nd Place; Open Class |
| 1978 | | Could it be Magic by Adrienne Anderson, Barry Manilow & Frédéric Chopin / Pepsi Theme / McDonald's Theme by Kevin Gavin & Sid Woloshin / Bandstand Boogie by Charles Albertine / Theme from New York, New York by John Kander & Fred Ebb | 57.850 | 4th Place; Class A Finalist |
| 1979 | | Circus March / Harrigan by George M. Cohan / Sheik Of Araby by Harry B. Smith, Francis Wheeler & Ted Snyder / Give My Regards to Broadway (from Little Johnny Jones) by George M. Cohan / Try to Remember by Harvey Schmidt & Tom Jones | 65.950 | 31st Place; Open Class |
| 1980 | | Circus March / Mambo Tambo by Miguelito Valdés / They're Playing Our Song by Marvin Hamlisch & Carole Bayer Sager / Pippin by Stephen Schwartz | 53.95 | 35th Place; Open Class |
| 1981 | | Annie by Charles Strouse & Martin Charnin / New York Jump / Walking Papers (from The Act) by John Kander & Fred Ebb / Mambo Tambo by Miguelito Valdés / Morning Glow (from Pippin) by Stephen Schwartz | 60.55 | 3rd Place; Class A Finalist |
| 1982 | | Selections from 42nd Street by Harry Warren & Al Dubin / Morning Glow (from Pippen) by Stephen Schwartz | 56.30 | 5th Place; Class A Finalist |
| 1983 | | Alexander's Ragtime Band by Irving Berlin / Way Down Yonder in New Orleans by John Turner Layton Jr. & Henry Creamer / I Feel the Earth Move by Carole King / Waiting for the A Train by Jimmie Rodgers / Lullaby of Broadway (from 42nd Street) by Harry Warren & Al Dubin | 51.450 | 20th Place; Open Class |
| 1984 | | Far From Over by Vince DiCola & Frank Stallone / All Night Long by Lionel Richie / Shop Around by Smokey Robinson & Berry Gordy / Waiting for the A Train by Jimmie Rodgers / La Cage Aux Folles by Jerry Herman | 64.700 | 15th Place; Open Class |
| 1985 | | Oklahoma! (from Oklahoma!) by Richard Rodgers & Oscar Hammerstein II / George M. Cohan Medley / Comedian's Galop by Dmitry Kabalevsky / Return of the Spiders by Alice Cooper, Glen Buxton, Michael Bruce, Dennis Dunaway & Neal Smith / The Hands of Time (Theme from Brian's Song) by Michel Legrand, Marilyn & Alan Bergman | Did not attend World Championships | |
| 1986 | | Irish Rhapsody by Victor Herbert / McNamara's Band by Guy Bonham, John J. Stamford, Red Latham, Shamus O'Connor & Wamp Carlson / The Girl I Left Behind (from Irish Suite) (Traditional), adapted by Leroy Anderson / Reeling and Railing (Traditional) / Kelly the Boy from Calion (Traditional) / When Irish Eyes Are Smiling by Ernest R. Ball, Chauncey Olcott & George Graff Jr. | 53.400 | 15th Place; Class A60 |
| 1987 | The American Spirit | America (from West Side Story) by Leonard Bernstein & Stephen Sondheim / When Irish Eyes Are Smiling by Ernest R. Ball, Chauncey Olcott & George Graff Jr. / America by Neil Diamond / Stars and Stripes Forever, Thunder March & Manhattan Beach March by John Philip Sousa | 57.500 | 13th Place; Class A60 |
| 1988 | | Rhapsody in Blue by George Gershwin / Jericho by Morton Gould / Carioca by Vincent Youmans, Edward Eliscu & Gus Kahn / Rockin' Robin by Leon René / My Old Kentucky Home & Camptown Races by Stephen Collins Foster / Autumn Leaves by Joseph Kosma & Jacques Prévert, adapted by Johnny Mercer / Way Down Yonder in New Orleans by Turner Layton & Henry Creamer | 69.200 | 11th Place; Class A60 |
| 1989 | | Lazy River by Hoagy Carmichael & Sidney Arodin / Go Tell It on the Mountain (Traditional) / Jericho by Morton Gould / Carioca by Vincent Youmans, Edward Eliscu & Gus Kahn / Where Is the Love by Ralph MacDonald & William Salter | 76.100 | 8th Place; Class A60 |
| 1990 | | Repertoire unavailable | 85.500 | 3rd Place; Class A60; Finalist |
| 1991 | Irish Festival | A collection of traditional Irish folk songs | 86.000 | 1st Place; Class A60; Champion |
| 1992 | | Jig (from Saint Paul's Suite, First Movement) by Gustav Holst / Freda by Kenny Baker / Minstrel Boy (Traditional) by Thomas Moore / The Rakes of Mallow (Traditional), adapted by Leroy Anderson / Four Scottish Dances by Malcolm Arnold | 88.700 | 5th Place; Division II & III; Finalist |
| 1993 | | Gary Owen March (Traditional) / Over There by George M. Cohan / Tramp! Tramp! Tramp! by George F. Root / My Bonny Boy (Traditional), adapted by Ralph Vaughan Williams / Far and Away by John Williams | 91.100 | 4th Place; Division II; Finalist |
| 1993 | | Gary Owen March (Traditional) / Over There by George M. Cohan / Tramp! Tramp! Tramp! by George F. Root / My Bonny Boy (Traditional), adapted by Ralph Vaughan Williams / Far and Away by John Williams | 65.500 | 27th Place; Division I |
| 1994 | Voices of the Isle | Four Scottish Dances by Malcolm Arnold / Maggie Goes To Scotland & The Seduction (from Year of the Comet) by Hummie Mann / Gary Owen March (Traditional) / Danny Boy (Traditional) by Frederic Weatherly | 96.000 | 1st Place; Division II & III; Champion |
| 1995 | Shades of the Emerald | Diamond Dance by Bill Douglas / Maggie Goes To Scotland, Helicopter Chase & The Seduction (from The Year of the Comet) by Hummie Mann / Cursum Perficio, Storms in Africa & Orinoco Flow by Enya & Roma Ryan | 95.400 | 1st Place; Division II; Champion |
| 1995 | Shades of the Emerald | Diamond Dance by Bill Douglas / Maggie Goes To Scotland, Helicopter Chase & The Seduction (from The Year of the Comet) by Hummie Mann / Cursum Perficio, Storms in Africa & Orinoco Flow by Enya & Roma Ryan | 74.700 | 18th Place; Division I |
| 1996 | Celtic Twilight | Highstep by Bill Douglas / The Journey Home by John Doan / Scotland the Brave (Traditional) / Gary Owen March (Traditional) | 95.300 | 2nd Place; Division II; Finalist |
| 1996 | Celtic Twilight | Highstep by Bill Douglas / The Journey Home by John Doan / Scotland the Brave (Traditional) / Gary Owen March (Traditional) | 74.100 | 20th Place; Division I |
| 1997 | Riverdance | Riverdance, The Heart's Cry, Shivna, Woman of Sidhe, Russian Dervish, American Wake, Firedance & Home and the Heartland; All from Riverdance by Bill Whelan | 76.800 | 19th Place; Division I |
| 1998 | Irish In Your Face | Irish Washerwoman (First Movement from Irish Suite) (Traditional), adapted by Leroy Anderson / Londonderry Air (Traditional), adapted by Percy Grainger / Irish Rhapsody by Victor Herbert | 77.200 | 18th Place; Division I |
| 1999 | Greensleeves | Flute Concerto Movement III by Christopher Rouse / The Girl I Left Behind (from Irish Suite) (Traditional), adapted by Leroy Anderson / Magh Seola (The Level Plain) by Gerard Fahy / The Cat Rambles to the Child's Saucepan (Traditional) / English Dances, 4th Mvt. by Malcolm Arnold / Dargason (from The Saint Paul's Suite – Mvt. 4) (Traditional), adapted by Gustav Holst | 75.300 | 17th Place; Division I Semifinalist |
| 2000 | Dances of Brigadoon | Fanfare / McConachy Square, Come To Me, Almost Like Being In Love & The Chase (from Brigadoon) by Alan Jay Lerner & Frederick Loewe | 77.60 | 16th Place; Division I Semifinalist |
| 2001 | Irish in the Civil War... A Quest for Freedom | Main Theme from Gettysburg by Randy Edelman / Variations on the Theme from Minstrel Boy by Frank McNamara / Over the Fence & Dawn (from Gettysburg) by Randy Edelman / Dixie by Daniel Decatur Emmett / Battle at Devil's Den (from Gettysburg) by Randy Edelman / America the Beautiful by Samuel A. Ward & Katharine Lee Bates | 79.300 | 18th Place; Division I |
| 2002 | Oliver! | Where is Love?, Main title theme, Be Back Soon, Consider Yourself, The Robbery, As Long as He Needs Me & Who Will Buy; All from Oliver! by Lionel Bart | 73.25 | 22nd Place; Division I |
| 2003 | Spirit of the Pioneer | The Song of Moses by David Holsinger | 72.300 | 23rd Place; Division I |
| 2004 | Return to Ireland | By Loch and Mountain by Robert W. Smith / Irish Washerwoman (First Movement from Irish Suite) (Traditional), adapted by Leroy Anderson / Irish Washerwoman (Traditional), adapted by Robert W. Smith / Lord of the Dance by Ronan Hardiman / Believe Me, If All Those Endearing Young Charms (Traditional) by Thomas Moore / Riverdance by Bill Whelan | 71.600 | 24th Place; Division I |
| 2005 | This Place Called Ireland | Our Homeland, The Irish Spirit, Tragic Legacy & Celtic Pride; All by Rick Kirby | 71.525 | 23rd Place; Division I |
| 2006 | Emeraldscapes | Tarantella (from The Blue Room and Other Stories) by Phil Kline / Slane (Traditional) | 71.550 | 23rd Place; Division I |
| 2007 | Fields of Green | Suite in E♭ by Gustav Holst / Dargason (from The Saint Paul's Suite – Mvt. 3) (Traditional), adapted by Gustav Holst / The Rakes of Mallow & Irish Washerwoman (Irish Suite, 1st Mvt.) (Traditional), adapted by Leroy Anderson / Minstrel Boy (Traditional) by Thomas Moore / Gary Owen March (Traditional) | 73.325 | 22nd Place; Division I |
| 2008 | Celtic Reflections | Suite in E♭ by Gustav Holst / Horkstow Grange (from Lincolnshire Posy) (Traditional), adapted by Percy Grainger / The Celtic Symphony by Brian Warfield / Richard III & Crown Imperial by William Walton | 74.125 | 20th Place; World Class |
| 2009 | Celtic Trinity | Three Celtic Dances by Brian Balmages / Into The Raging River by Steven Reineke | 75.750 | 21st Place; World Class |
| 2010 | Corps Prayer | Swing Low, Sweet Chariot by Wallace Willis / Make His Praise Glorious by Bill and Robin Wolaver / The Prayer by David Foster, Carole Bayer Sager, Alberto Testa & Tony Renis / Stained Glass by David Gillingham / Old Hundredth (Doxology) by Loys Bourgeois | 73.950 | 23rd Place; World Class |
| 2011 | Celebrate | Four Scottish Dances by Malcolm Arnold / Song without Words, I'll Love My Love from 2nd Suite in F for Military Band (Traditional), adapted by Gustav Holst / New World Symphony by Antonin Dvořák / As Time Goes By (from Everybody's Welcome) by Herman Hupfeld | 68.400 | 27th Place; World Class |
| 2012 | Irish Immigrants: The Hands that Built America | New World Symphony by Antonín Dvořák / Recollections of Ireland by Ignaz Moscheles / I'll Take You Home Again Kathleen by Thomas P. Westendorf / I'm Shipping Up To Boston by Woody Guthrie, Al Barr, Ken Casey, Matt Kelly, James Lynch, Marc Orrell, Josh "Scruffy" Wallace & Tim Brennan | 66.200 | 27th Place; World Class |
| 2013 | A New Spirit | Doxology by Loys Bourgeois & Thomas Ken / Awesome God by Rich Mullins / It Is Well With My Soul by Philip Bliss & Horatio Spafford / Just A Closer Walk With Thee (Traditional) / When the Saints Go Marching In (Traditional), adapted by Luther G. Presley / The Hymn of Joy by Ludwig van Beethoven & Henry van Dyke / Gary Owen (Traditional) | 69.050 | 28th Place; World Class |
| 2014 | Joy! | A Mighty Fortress Is Our God by Martin Luther / We Gather Together by Adrianus Valerius / When the Saints Go Marching In by Virgil Oliver Stamps & Luther G. Presley / Hallelujah Chorus (from The Messiah, Part II) by George Frideric Handel / Irish Tune from County Derry (Traditional), adapted by Percy Grainger / Gary Owen (Traditional) | 68.850 | 30th Place; World Class |
| 2015 | Exodus: Divide the Sea, Unite the People | Exodus by Ernest Gold / The Ten Commandments by Elmer Bernstein / Man of Steel by Hans Zimmer | 66.175 | 29th Place; World Class |
| 2016 | The Story of St. Joan of Arc | Act I: Voices– Voices of the Sky by Samuel Hazo; Act II: Conflict– Lauds (Praise High Day) by Ron Nelson; Act III: Capture and Condemnation– Adagio for Strings by Samuel Barber; Act IV: Ascension– Firebird Suite by Igor Stravinsky | 68.375 | 29th Place; World Class |
| 2017 | Irish on Broadway: The Music of Les Misérables | Look Down, At the End of the Day, Master of the House, On My Own, The Attack on Rue Plumet & One Day More; All from Les Misérables by Claude-Michel Schönberg, Alain Boublil, Jean-Marc Natel & Herbert Kretzmer | 65.913 | 34th Place; World Class |
| 2018 | Celtic Dragons | The Awakening by Rob Stein, Dave Campbell & Julia Coleman / Taking Flight (from How To Train Your Dragon) by John Powell / Dragon Fire & Beneath the Earth and Sky by Rob Stein, Dave Campbell & Julia Coleman | 64.300 | 36th Place; World Class |

== Traditions ==
Pioneer has a tradition of Irish and Celtic influence in its uniforms and musical programs. This and the corps' shamrock logo are a heritage of the Imperials of St. Patrick.

Since the corps' days in Division III, Pioneer's motto has been "Better Every Day". This motto had been used by the Marion (OH) Cadets D&B corps, who in 1990 allowed Pioneer to also use it.

Whether it was a part of the year's musical program or not, from at least the mid-1990s Pioneer concluded each performance by marching off the field and/or "trooping the stands" (marching across the front of the grandstand in parade formation) while playing the traditional Irish air Garryowen (better known as the Garry Owen march). This tradition has occurred less frequently since 2010 but is still performed at parades.

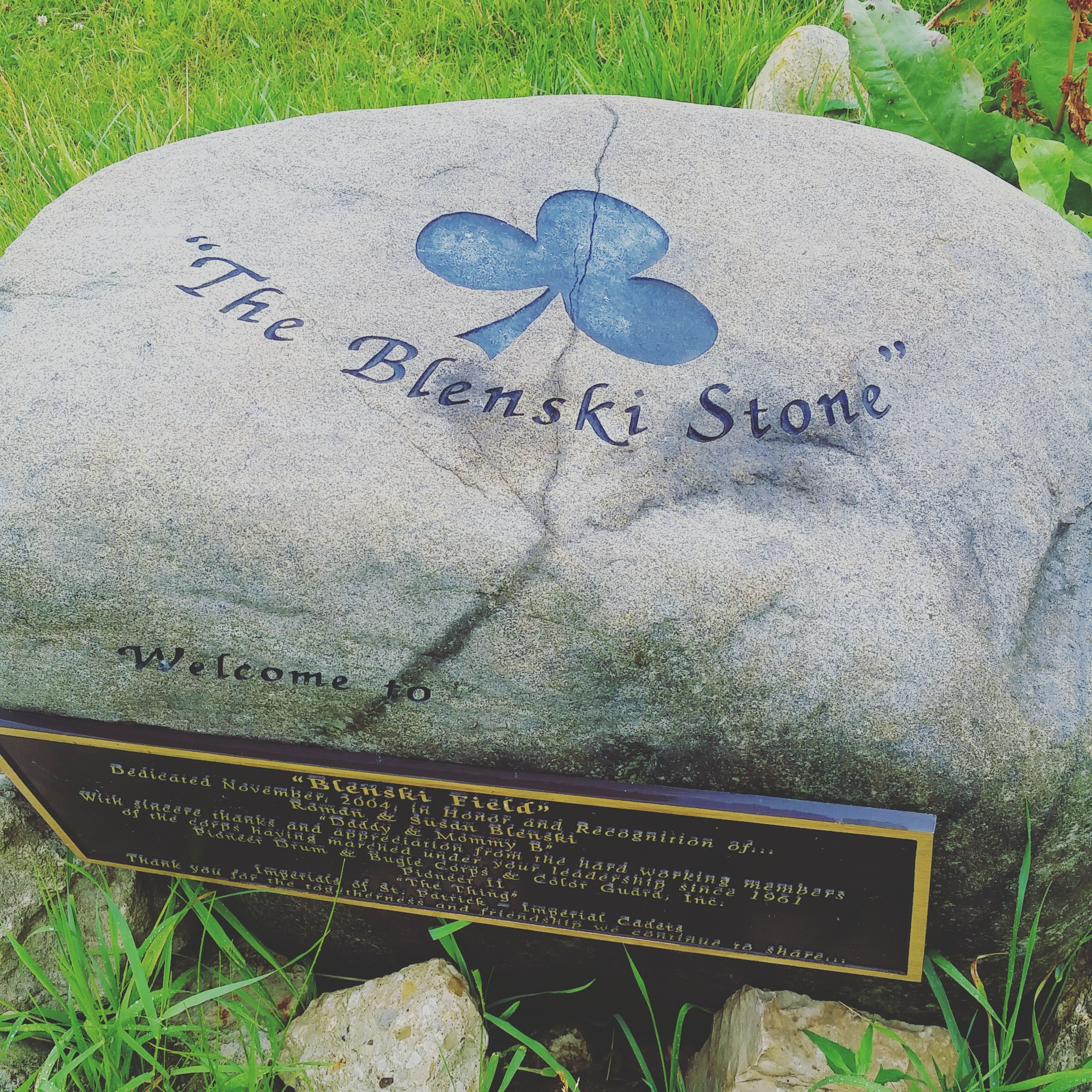
A picture of "The Blenski Stone" at the entrance of the main field at Pioneerland in Cudahy, Wisconsin.

Purchased on St. Patrick's Day in 1993, the "Pioneer Musical Youth Center", better known as "Pioneerland", is a 7 acres (2.8 ha) property in the Milwaukee suburb of Cudahy, Wisconsin, which is the corps' own rehearsal and storage facility.
