= Arrangers' Publishing Company =

American music publisher

- Founded: 1985
- Founder: W.C. Gore
- Genre: Various
- Country of origin: United States
- Location: Nashville, Tennessee
- Official website: arrangerspublishingcompany.com

The Arrangers' Publishing Company (APC) is an American publisher of marching band music, concert band music and drill designs for middle school, high school and college bands.

The company originated in 1985 with the goal of providing a new approach to marching band music. In 1992, APC published its first concert band literature. Low-cost drill designs presented in an easy-to-use format were offered shortly thereafter.

The company's focus has been on the effectiveness of the arrangement, showcasing diverse and sometimes unlikely material, with genres ranging from hard rock and heavy metal to jazz and American patriotic music. APC produces full-length studio recordings of its music.

Notable APC arrangers and composers include Roland Barrett, Kenny Bierschenk, Scott Boerma, Jay Dawson, John Fannin, Gary P. Gilroy, Larry Kerchner, Bill Locklear, Victor Lopez, Chris McDonald, Joe Murphy, Brad Pearson, Timothy Rhea, Steve Reisteter, Jeff Simmons, Tom Wallace and Bill Wiedrich.

The company is incorporated in the state of Tennessee and headquartered in Nashville. Jay Dawson and Jeff Hearington are the owners and officers of the company. Dawson is the president and continues to arrange and compose music for marching and concert bands.
