= Southwind Drum and Bugle Corps =

Open Class competitive junior drum and bugle corps based in Mobile, Alabama

- Southwind Drum and Bugle Corps logo
- Location: Montgomery, Alabama (1980–1997); Lexington, Kentucky (1998–2007); Mobile, Alabama (2014–2023)
- Division: Open Class
- Founded: 1980
- Folded: 2023
- Championship titles: DCI Open Class; 1991; 1992
- Website: www.southwind.org

Southwind Drum and Bugle Corps was an Open Class competitive junior drum and bugle corps based in Mobile, Alabama. The corps was a Division I (now World Class) competitive junior drum and bugle corps in Drum Corps International (DCI) from 1993 through 2007. Prior to competing in Division I, Southwind competed in DCI's Class A/Division II and was that division's World Champion in 1991 and 1992. Southwind performed at competitive and non-competitive SoundSport events in Alabama and surrounding states during the summer of 2014. In early May 2015, DCI approved Southwind's return as an active Open Class corps. Southwind announced the cessation of operations in October 2023.

== History ==
Southwind was founded in 1980 by Michael D. Terry when a group of high school students at Robert E. Lee High School in Montgomery, Alabama wanted to march in a local drum corps. After setting up a non-profit youth organization and getting a charter as Explorer Post 2009 from the Tuckabatchi Boy Scout Council, Southwind's initial organizational meeting was held on November 23, 1980 in downtown Montgomery.

The corps took its name from the Chicago-to-Miami passenger train "The South Wind" that passed through Montgomery on tracks beside what became the corps' practice field. In 1981, Southwind toured to contests in Alabama, Georgia, Mississippi, Tennessee, and North Carolina before traveling to Philadelphia for the VFW National Drum and Bugle Contest (placing 5th of 8 corps) and then on the DCI World Championships in Montreal, where they finished 39th of 49 corps in Open Class Prelims. The corps undertook an even more extensive tour in 1982, where they placed 5th of 10 corps in the Drum Corps South circuit championships, and made another trip to the DCI World Championships in Montreal, where they were 36th of 49 corps in Open Class Prelims.

Loss of many charter members and debt accrued during the first two seasons caused the corps to go inactive before the start of the 1983 season. From 1983 through 1988, a cadre of supporters continued to raise funds to retire the outstanding debt.

Southwind returned to competition in 1989. The corps toured throughout the South, then traveled to Kansas City, Missouri, where they placed 10th of 23 corps in Class A60 (for corps with no more than 60 members). The corps improved to 4th of 23 corps in Class A60 at Buffalo, New York in 1990.

In 1991, Southwind moved into Class A and was undefeated in 16 contests against only Class A corps and won the DCI Class A World Championship over 18 other corps at Dallas. In 1992, Southwind continued its winning streak in the renamed Division II, placing first in another 16 shows before falling to 3rd place among 18 corps in Division II prelims at Whitewater, Wisconsin before rebounding in finals to claim its second DCI World Championship. In both 1991 and 1992, Southwind finished among the top 25 corps in DCI's Open Class/Division I quarterfinals, earning full membership in the organization.

Southwind moved to competing solely in Division I in 1993 and beyond. For five seasons, the corps placed 17th through 24th at DCI Finals, but was finding it more and more difficult for the small group of local boosters to administer the unit. In the 1997 season, several staff members of the Madison Scouts also worked with Southwind; at the end of the season, corps director Dave Bryan approached the Scouts' management about assuming the sponsorship of Southwind. In 1998, the Madison Drum and Bugle Corps Association, Inc. took over the operation of Southwind. The corps was inactive for that season, as its operations were moved from Montgomery to Lexington, Kentucky.

Returning to the field in 1999, Southwind placed 15th at DCI Championships in Madison, Wisconsin. 2000 was Southwind's best season in Division I, as the corps finished 13th at College Park, Maryland, although the corps scored no worse than 12th in all captions. Southwind finished 15th at Buffalo in 2001 and 18th at Madison in 2002.

Back on its own, Southwind formed the Bluegrass Youth Performance Corporation as a sponsoring organization. The corps continued as a Division I corps through 2007, when economic conditions led the corps to another period of inactivity.

2011 through 2013 were rebuilding years for the organization as they raised funds and sought sponsorships for returning the corps to competition. The corps also returned to the Mobile area. In November and December 2013, Southwind held its first recruitment and audition camps since leaving the field in 2007. In 2014, the organization fielded a 50-member SoundSport team and performing in exhibition at some DCI shows as a route to reentering DCI competition in 2015.

In early May 2015, DCI approved Southwind's return as an active Open Class corps and placed the corps on the summer schedule for five shows in Alabama, Georgia, and Mississippi. In 2016, Southwind had a limited tour of six performances that culminated in the Southeastern Championship in Atlanta. In 2017, the corps embarked on a full-season tour, including a return to DCI Open Class Championships and DCI World Championships for the first time since 2007. Southwind made Open Class Finals and finished 9th place.

Southwind was inactive during 2020 and 2021 due to the COVID-19 pandemic, but they returned to competition in 2022. In 2023, they earned a bronze medal at Open Class Finals. On October 11, 2023, Southwind announced that it was ceasing operations due to rising transportation and housing costs.

== Show summary (1981–2023) ==
Key
Light blue background indicates DCI Open Class Finalist (Note: From 1989–1991, Southwind competed in Class A60. In 1992, they competed in Division II; and since 2017, they have competed in Open Class. These are the same tier, just renamed.)
Goldenrod background indicates DCI Open Class Champion
Pale green background indicates DCI World Class Semifinalist (Note: In 1991, Southwind also competed at the Open Class championships, from 1992–2007 at the Division I championships, and since 2017 at the World Class championships. These are the same competition, just renamed.)

Year	Theme	Repertoire	World Championships	
Year	Theme	Repertoire	Score	Placement
1981		Prelude and Rondo by David Holsinger / Hoedown (from Rodeo) by Aaron Copland / Miserlou (Traditional), adapted by Nicholas Roubanis / Granada Smoothie by Mark Taylor / Bless the Beasts and Children by Barry De Vorzon & Perry Botkin Jr. / Alabamy Bound by Ray Henderson, Buddy DeSylva & Bud Green / Stars Fell On Alabama by Frank Perkins & Mitchell Parish	51.800	39th Place; Open Class
1982		Song of the South / Magic (from Pippin) by Stephen Schwartz / Granada Smoothie by Mark Taylor / Fugeace by Gianluigi Trovesi / I Sing the Body Electric (from Fame) by Michael Gore & Dean Pitchford	53.800	36th Place; Open Class
1983–88	Corps inactive			
1989		Southland by Salvatore '"Tutti" Camarata / Stars Fell On Alabama by Frank Perkins & Mitchell Parish	71.300	10th Place; Class A60
1990		You are My Sunshine by Jimmie Davis & Charles Mitchell / Lucretia MacEvil by David Clayton-Thomas / Sometimes in Winter by Steve Katz / God Bless the Child by Billie Holiday & Arthur Herzog Jr. / (Your Love Keeps Lifting Me) Higher and Higher by Gary Jackson & Carl Smith	82.000	4th Place; Class A60; Finalist
1991	The Little Mermaid	Fanfare, Tour of the Kingdom, Poor Unfortunate Souls, Eric to the Rescue, The Storm, Part of Your World & Happy Ending; All from The Little Mermaid by Alan Menken & Howard Ashman	92.700	1st Place; Class A & A60; Champion
1991	The Little Mermaid	Fanfare, Tour of the Kingdom, Poor Unfortunate Souls, Eric to the Rescue, The Storm, Part of Your World & Happy Ending; All from The Little Mermaid by Alan Menken & Howard Ashman	68.000	23rd Place; Open Class
1992	Robin Hood: Prince of Thieves	Overture, The Prisoner of the Crusades, Marian at the Waterfall, The Abduction, The Wedding Scene & The Final Battle; All from Robin Hood: Prince of Thieves by Michael Kamen	92.900	1st Place; Division II & III; Champion
1992	Robin Hood: Prince of Thieves	Overture, The Prisoner of the Crusades, Marian at the Waterfall, The Abduction, The Wedding Scene & The Final Battle; All from Robin Hood: Prince of Thieves by Michael Kamen	73.600	22nd Place; Division I
1993	Far and Away	Joseph's Dream, Life in Ireland, The American Way, Reunion & The Land Race; All from Far and Away by John Williams	73.000	22nd Place; Division I
1994	A League Of Their Own	Making the Team, Life Goes On & The Final Game; All from A League Of Their Own by Hans Zimmer	69.100	19th Place; Division I
1995	Gospel	Precious Lord, Take My Hand by Thomas A. Dorsey / Jericho by Morton Gould / Sweet, Sweet Spirit by Doris Akers / Are You Ready for a Miracle (from Leap of Faith) by Art Reynolds & Bunny Hull / Oh Happy Day by Edwin Hawkins / Brand New day (from The Wiz) by Charlie Smalls	71.900	17th Place; Division I Semifinalist
1996	A Gospel Celebration	Make His Praise Glorious by Bill and Robin Wolaver / Amazing Love by John Schweers / Resurrection Ceremony by Greg Gumina / Are You Ready for a Miracle (from Leap of Faith) by Art Reynolds & Bunny Hull / All Creatures of Our God and King by St Francis of Assisi & Friedrich Spee, adapted by William Henry Draper	66.800	24th Place; Division I
1997	Scenes from Childhood	Niesdance by David Holsinger / Children's March by Percy Grainger / Daydreaming by Hans Zimmer / Iron Will by Joel McNeely	71.700	21st Place; Division I
1998	Corps inactive			
1999	An American Salute	American Salute by Morton Gould / Kentucky Suite / Hymn to the Fallen (from Saving Private Ryan) & Summon the Heroes by John Williams	78.400	15th Place; Division I Semifinalist
2000		Suite for Band by Gustav Holst / Legends of the Fall by James Horner / Les Preludes & Totentanz by Franz Liszt	84.950	13th Place; Division I Semifinalist
2001	A New Era	Fanfare for a New Era by Jack Stamp / Academic Festival Overture by Johannes Brahms / Concerto for Violin and Orchestra by Samuel Barber / Fire Storm by Stephen Bulla	80.050	15th Place; Division I Semifinalist
2002	Evolution	Toccata and Fugue in D Minor by Johann Sebastian Bach / Marche Slav by Pyotr Ilyich Tchaikovsky / Prelude by John Bogenschutz / Esprit de Corps by Robert E. Jager	79.250	18th Place; Division I
2003	Dance Portraits	Gayne Ballet by Aram Khachaturian	77.500	21st Place; Division I
2004	A Journey Through the Sands	Music from The Mummy by Jerry Goldsmith	78.050	18th Place; Division I
2005	A Distorted Imagination	Star of Bethlehem (from Ben-Hur) by Miklós Rózsa / Pure Imagination (from Willy Wonka and the Chocolate Factory) by Leslie Bricusse & Anthony Newley / The Battle (from Gladiator) by Hans Zimmer & Lisa Gerrard / Mars (from The Planets) by Gustav Holst / Blue Shadows and Purple Hills (from Spartacus) by Alex North / Main Title (from The Wind and The Lion) by Jerry Goldsmith / Incantation (from Quidam) by Benoît Jutras / The Mother's Love (from Ben-Hur) by Miklós Rózsa / Bacchanale (from Samson and Delilah) by Camille Saint-Saëns / Reunited (from Van Helsing) by Alan Silvestri / The Horseman & Raisuli Attacks (from The Wind and The Lion) by Jerry Goldsmith	80.950	16th Place; Division I Semifinalist
2006	Duality	Firebird Suite by Igor Stravinsky / In the Spring, When Kings Go Off to War by David Holsinger / Lost in the Darkness (from Jekyll and Hyde) by Frank Wildhorn and Leslie Bricusse / Pie Jesu (from Requiem) by Andrew Lloyd Webber / Incantation (from Quidam) by Benoît Jutras / Clair de Lune by Claude Debussy / Tenth Symphony by Dmitri Shostakovich / Original Music by Steve Vento	77.950	18th Place; Division I
2007	InTheLoop	InTheLoop by Steve Vento, Shane Gwaltney & Eric Willie	77.950	19th Place; Division I
2008–13	Corps inactive			
2014	Our Heart Beats	New Life & New Tricks by Jeremy Johnson / New and Old by Jeremy Johnson	Did not attend World Championships	
2015	By The Numbers	Morning Alleluias by Ron Nelson / Romeo and Juliet by Pyotr Ilyich Tchaikovsky / Symphonic Dance No. 3 by Clifton Williams / America by Dan Reynolds, Daniel Wayne Sermon, Daniel Platzman & Ben McKee (Imagine Dragons) / Halloween Music by Kevin MacLeod / Carol of the Bells (Traditional), adapted by Mykola Leontovych & Peter J. Wilhousky	Did not attend World Championships	
2016	Motion	The Chairman Dances by John Adams (composer) / Spinning Wheel by David Clayton-Thomas / Rest by Frank Ticheli / Ride by Samuel Hazo	Did not attend World Championships	
2017	Toxic Mind	Wrecking Ball by MoZella, Stephan Moccio, Sacha Skarbek, Kiyanu Kim, Lukasz Sebastian Gottwald & Henry Russell Walter / The Rite of Spring by Igor Stravinsky / Creep by Thom Yorke, Jonny Greenwood, Colin Greenwood, Ed O'Brien & Phil Selway (Radiohead) and Albert Hammond & Mike Hazlewood / Superstition by Stevie Wonder / Dies Irae / Toxic by Cathy Dennis, Christian Karlsson, Pontus Winnberg & Henrik Jonback / Hysteria by Matt Bellamy, Chris Wolstenholme & Dominic Howard (Muse)	70.125	9th Place; Open Class; Finalist
2017	Toxic Mind	Wrecking Ball by MoZella, Stephan Moccio, Sacha Skarbek, Kiyanu Kim, Lukasz Sebastian Gottwald & Henry Russell Walter / The Rite of Spring by Igor Stravinsky / Creep by Thom Yorke, Jonny Greenwood, Colin Greenwood, Ed O'Brien & Phil Selway (Radiohead) and Albert Hammond & Mike Hazlewood / Superstition by Stevie Wonder / Dies Irae / Toxic by Cathy Dennis, Christian Karlsson, Pontus Winnberg & Henrik Jonback / Hysteria by Matt Bellamy, Chris Wolstenholme & Dominic Howard (Muse)	68.838	32nd Place; World Class
2018	The Guitarist	Danzon No. 2 by Arturo Márquez / A Mis Abuelos by Arturo Sandoval / Everything I Can't Have by Robin Thicke, James Gass & Moises Vivanco / Sing to the Moon by Laura Mvula & Steve Brown	69.700	10th Place; Open Class; Finalist
2018	The Guitarist	Danzon No. 2 by Arturo Márquez / A Mis Abuelos by Arturo Sandoval / Everything I Can't Have by Robin Thicke, James Gass & Moises Vivanco / Sing to the Moon by Laura Mvula & Steve Brown	66.438	33rd Place; World Class
2019	Caged	Drive to Bohemia by Elliot Goldenthal / Highwire by John Mackey / The Grind by Justin Williams / Ordinary World by Simon Le Bon, John Taylor, James Bates & Warren Cuccurullo (Duran Duran) / Symphonia Resurrectus (from Easter Symphony) by David Holsinger	75.638	5th Place; Open Class; Finalist
2019	Caged	Drive to Bohemia by Elliot Goldenthal / Highwire by John Mackey / The Grind by Justin Williams / Ordinary World by Simon Le Bon, John Taylor, James Bates & Warren Cuccurullo (Duran Duran) / Symphonia Resurrectus (from Easter Symphony) by David Holsinger	72.363	27th Place; World Class
2020	Season cancelled due to the COVID-19 pandemic			
2021	Opted out of competition for the season			
2022	STAND	Stand Up by Cynthia Erivo / Level Up by Vienna Teng / Man In The Mirror by Michael Jackson / Original Music by Ryan Reed & Elanders Frazier	77.638	6th Place; Open Class; Finalist
2022	STAND	Stand Up by Cynthia Erivo / Level Up by Vienna Teng / Man In The Mirror by Michael Jackson / Original Music by Ryan Reed & Elanders Frazier	73.125	28th Place; World Class
2023	Cowboys of the Sky	Rhapsody in Blue by George Gershwin / Our Town by Aaron Copland / Urban Light by James M David / Music from On Golden Pond by Dave Grusin	79.125	3rd Place; Open Class; Finalist
2023	Cowboys of the Sky	Rhapsody in Blue by George Gershwin / Our Town by Aaron Copland / Urban Light by James M David / Music from On Golden Pond by Dave Grusin	77.450	22nd Place; World Class; Semifinalist
