= Duke Preston =

American football player (born 1982)

Tampa Bay Buccaneers
- Title: Vice president of player engagement

Personal information
- Born: June 12, 1982 (age 44); San Diego, California, U.S.
- Listed height: 6 ft 5 in (1.96 m)
- Listed weight: 320 lb (145 kg)

Career information
- Position: Center (No. 69, 75)
- High school: Mt. Carmel (San Diego)
- College: Illinois
- NFL draft: 2005: 4th round, 122nd overall pick

Career history
- Buffalo Bills (2005–2008); Green Bay Packers (2009)*; Dallas Cowboys (2009)
- * Offseason or practice squad member only

Career NFL statistics
- Games played: 59
- Games started: 20
- Fumble recoveries: 2
- Stats at Pro Football Reference

Raymond Newton Preston III (born June 12, 1982) is an American former professional football player who was a center in the National Football League (NFL) for the Buffalo Bills and Dallas Cowboys. He was selected by the Buffalo Bills in the fourth round of the 2005 NFL draft. He played college football for the Illinois Fighting Illini.

== Early life ==
Preston graduated from Mt. Carmel High School in San Diego, where he practiced football and baseball.

== College career ==
Preston accepted a football scholarship from the University of Illinois. He was a three-year starter at center and only allowed one sack in his last two seasons. He started 35 straight games.

== Professional career ==
Pre-draft measurables
Height	Weight	Arm length	Hand span	40-yard dash	10-yard split	20-yard split	20-yard shuttle	Three-cone drill	Vertical jump	Broad jump	Bench press
6 ft 5 1/8 in (1.96 m)	311 lb (141 kg)	33 7/8 in (0.86 m)	10 1/8 in (0.26 m)	5.44 s	1.81 s	3.09 s	4.53 s	7.58 s	32.0 in (0.81 m)	8 ft 0 in (2.44 m)	21 reps
All values from NFL Combine

=== Buffalo Bills ===
Preston was selected by the Buffalo Bills in the fourth round (122nd overall) of the 2005 NFL draft. He competed for the starting position to help fill the void left with the departure of Trey Teague. As a rookie, he played in all 16 games, starting one game for the injured Chris Villarrial, while playing on special teams. He was also named to The Sporting News All-Rookie Team.

In 2006, Preston appeared in all 16 games for the Bills while starting in 8 of the contests. In 2007, Preston failed to start in any games for the Bills, but made appearances in 13 of the club's 16 games.

In 2008, Preston started a career-high 11 games, all at center, sharing time with Melvin Fowler. He has also played some guard and right tackle for the Bills making appearances in 15 of the teams 16 contests.

During the four years Preston spent with the Bills, he appeared in 59 of the teams 64 contests while getting a starting nod in 20 of them. After the 2008 season, Preston became an unrestricted free agent. In 2009, Preston and Fowler were replaced by Geoff Hangartner.

=== Green Bay Packers ===
On March 30, 2009, he was signed as a free agent by the Green Bay Packers. He was released on August 25.

=== Dallas Cowboys ===
On August 26, 2009, he signed with the Dallas Cowboys, declining offers from the Cleveland Browns and Oakland Raiders. He was released on October 10, to make room for Chauncey Washington who was signed from the practice squad. He was re-signed on October 12, after Washington was waived. He was declared inactive in 15 regular season games and 2 playoff games.

On May 8, 2010, Preston announced his retirement from professional football.

== Personal life ==
His father, Ray Preston, was a standout football player at Syracuse University, and had a nine-year NFL career with the San Diego Chargers. He has one sister Casie currently living and teaching in Indianapolis.

After football, he earned a master's degree in Christian Education from the Dallas Theological Seminary. In 2013, he was hired as the program director for the University of Notre Dame's Student Welfare and Development. In 2015, he was hired by the Tampa Bay Buccaneers as the team's director of player engagement.
