= Ricky Sharpe (American football) =

American football player (born 1980)

No. 23
- Position: Defensive back

Personal information
- Born: January 23, 1980 (age 46); Seattle, Washington, U.S.
- Listed height: 6 ft 1 in (1.85 m)
- Listed weight: 190 lb (86 kg)

Career information
- High school: Mt. Carmel (San Diego, California)
- College: San Diego State (1998–2002)
- NFL draft: 2003: undrafted

Career history
- Cleveland Browns (2003–2004)*; → Frankfurt Galaxy (2004); Miami Dolphins (2004)*; Los Angeles Avengers (2006)
- * Offseason or practice squad member only
- Stats at ArenaFan.com

Ricky Sharpe (born January 23, 1980) is an American former football player. He played college football at San Diego State, and signed with the Cleveland Browns as an undrafted free agent in 2003. He later played in the Arena Football League as a defensive back/wide receiver for the Los Angeles Avengers.

== Early life ==
Sharpe attended Mt. Carmel High School in San Diego, California, where he was a standout in football, basketball, and track & field.

== College career ==
Sharpe attended San Diego State University, where he was an All-Mountain West Conference second team selection as a sophomore and senior, and an All-Mountain West Conference honorable mention selection as a junior. He finished his career with 191 tackles, six interceptions, and three fumble recoveries.

== After football ==
Sharpe was a contestant on the 2011 season of the reality game show Expedition Impossible.
