= Scott Boerma =

American composer

Scott Boerma (born 1964) is a composer of contemporary classical music, an arranger of music for marching ensembles, and the Director of Bands at Western Michigan University.

== Biography ==
Before joining the Western Michigan faculty, Boerma was Associate Director of Bands, Director of the Michigan Marching Band, and the Donald R. Shepherd Associate Professor of Conducting at the University of Michigan. Before those positions, Boerma was Director of Bands at Eastern Michigan University, and he began his career teaching music in the Michigan public schools at Novi and Lamphere High Schools.

Boerma earned his Doctor of Musical Arts degree in wind conducting at Michigan State University and his Master of Music degree in music education at the University of Michigan, where he also studied composition with Pulitzer-Prize winning composer William Bolcom. He received his Bachelor of Music degree in music education at Western Michigan University, where he also studied composition with Ramon Zupko. Boerma has also studied composition with Anthony Iannaccone at Eastern Michigan University.

== Works ==
An active composer, Boerma’s concert band works have been performed by many outstanding ensembles, including “The President’s Own” Marine Band, the Dallas Wind Symphony, the University of North Texas Wind Symphony, the Tokyo Kosei Wind Orchestra, the University of Illinois Wind Symphony, the University of Michigan Symphony & Concert Bands, the Baylor University Wind Ensemble, the Interlochen Arts Camp High School Symphonic Band, and the BOA Honor Band of America, to name just a few. His music has been heard in such venues as Carnegie Hall, Hill Auditorium, the Myerson Symphony Center, the Krannert Center for the Performing Arts, and at the Chicago Midwest International Band and Orchestra Clinic. Boerma’s works have been featured in the popular GIA series, “Teaching Music Through Performance in Band.” He is commissioned each year by high school, university and community bands to write new works for the repertoire.

Also a prolific arranger, Boerma receives yearly commissions to write music for many university and high school marching bands and drum and bugle corps. From 1989-2006 and from 2014-2018, he was the music arranger for the top-ranking Madison Scouts Drum & Bugle Corps. From 2008-2013, he arranged for the Spirit of Atlanta Drum & Bugle Corps. Additionally, Boerma has arranged for drum and bugle corps and bands from Japan, United Kingdom, The Netherlands, and Thailand. Other credits include marching band arrangements for the University of Michigan, Michigan State University, the University of Texas (both Austin and Arlington), the University of Illinois, Purdue University, Towson University, Texas Tech University, Baylor University, Jacksonville State University, and Western Michigan University, to name just a few. Most of the Big Ten university marching bands have performed Boerma’s arrangements. Boerma has also written arrangements for the Boston Pops and the Detroit Chamber Winds Brass.

Many of Boerma's works are published by the Neil A. Kjos Music Company, Boosey & Hawkes, Carl Fischer Music, Theodore Presser, Arrangers' Publishing Company and, Madison Music Works.

== Recordings ==
Boerma's work Poem, a tribute to Bernie Kuschel, was recorded on the CD 2007 WASBE Killarney Ireland by the Dublin Concert Band.
