= Drum Corps International =

Non-Profit event production organization for drum and bugle corps

- Drum Corps International logo
- Abbreviation: DCI
- Established: October 1971; 55 years ago
- Type: Performing arts organization
- Tax ID no.: 36-2754480
- Legal status: 501(c)(3) organization
- Headquarters: Indianapolis, Indiana, U.S.
- Region served: United States; Canada
- Members: 50 (2024)
- Chairman: Jonathan Powell
- Chief Executive Officer: Katrina Alexander
- Revenue: ▼US$13.27 million (2023)
- Expenses: ▼US$13.2 million (2023)
- Website: dci.org

Drum Corps International (DCI) is a governing body for drum and bugle corps. Founded in 1971 and known as "marching music's major league," DCI develops and enforces rules of competition and judges at sanctioned drum and bugle corps competitions throughout the United States and Canada. It is headquartered in Indianapolis, Indiana. In 2023, Drum Corps Associates (DCA) and DCI joined in at least a two-year partnership to jointly govern the drum and bugle corps activity in North America.

== History ==
In 1971, at the urging of then-director of The Cavaliers Don Warren and Troopers director Jim Jones, the directors from Blue Stars, Madison Scouts, and Santa Clara Vanguard, cooperated to form the "Midwest Combine". The Combine corps would market themselves to show promoters as a package.

The partnership was a reaction to perceived inflexibility of the American Legion and VFW, who were the primary sponsors of competing drum corps and the hosts of the only high-prestige national championships. Another source of contention was low-to-nonexistent appearance fees paid to independent corps who were neither sponsored nor affiliated with any veterans post. Only those independent corps who placed among the top three at either of the national championships were paid any appearance fees, which deterred many corps from competing. Many local show sponsors and promoters rarely paid appearance fees to any corps.

A similar combine of five drum corps had formed in the Northeast known informally as the Alliance. (Note: United Organization of Junior Corps (UOJC) known informally as the Alliance or Junior Corps Alliance.) Its members were: 27th Lancers, Garfield Cadets, Boston Crusaders, Blessed Sacrament Golden Knights, and Blue Rock.

Despite objections from veterans associations, and boycotts by adjudicators, both the Combine and the Alliance remained intact for the 1971 competitive season. After discussions during the VFW National Championships, the members of both groups agreed to meet at the next American Legion Uniformed Group Rules Congress to discuss forming a new, independent, governing body. Also invited to the meeting were representatives from the Anaheim Kingsmen, Argonne Rebels, and De La Salle Oaklands. Drum Corps International was established by thirteen corps on or after October 21, 1971. (Note: The American Legion Uniformed Groups Rules Congress was likely simultaneous with, or after, a meeting of the American Legion National Executive Committee, which occurred on October 20–21, 1971. Several primary sources list the founding date of DCI as "November 1971", others disagree saying "October 1971".)

DCI Founding members
Midwest Combine	The Alliance	Other invited corps
Blue Stars*	27th Lancers	Anaheim Kingsmen
The Cavaliers*	Blessed Sacrament	Argonne Rebels
Madison Scouts*	Blue Rock	De La Salle Oaklands
Santa Clara Vanguard*	Boston Crusaders*	
Troopers*	Garfield Cadets	
* Corps still active in 2026.

Given difficulties experienced during the 1971 season, the founding members agreed not to interfere with the long-established regional competition circuits, especially those sponsored by the veterans organizations, but to boycott a number of events whom the founders felt were not well organized or were exploitative, such as Fleetwood Record's World Open Championship. The members also agreed to develop their own adjudicators committee instead of relying on any existing association. Additionally, member corps would be allowed to compete where they wished with few exceptions. However, all member corps would be required to attend a specific number of sanctioned competitions as well as an annual World Championship which would be scheduled in mid-August, after the VFW championships and before the American Legion nationals. Members also agreed to remain united when acting against a disruptive event promoter, or music business. The first united act was the boycott against Fleetwood Records over rights issues.

The first World Championship was hosted at Warhawks Stadium (University of Wisconsin–Whitewater) on August 18, 1972. In attendance were thirty-nine corps from fifteen states and one Canadian province. The Anaheim Kingsmen Drum and Bugle Corps was named the inaugural DCI World Champion.

Following the creation of DCI, the Combine evolved into Drum Corps Midwest (DCM), while the Alliance grew into Drum Corps East, sometimes called Drum Corps Atlantic. (Note: Drum Corps Midwest (DCM) was an independent association of drum corps, while Drum Corps East was operated by DCI.) Both DCM, Drum Corps East, and other associations such as NJA, offered a limited schedule of competitions ending with a championship prior to DCI's schedule of competitions, dividing the competitive season between "regional" and "national tour". DCI gradually expanded its schedule to start earlier in the competitive season, and thus the "regional tour" declined and many of those events were replaced with DCI-sanctioned competitions. Other prestige events which pre-dated DCI's founding were also absorbed into the DCI schedule, such as the annual U.S. Open in Marion, Ohio and the Eastern Classic at J. Birney Crum Stadium. American Legion and VFW posts in the Midwest or New England continue to host drum corps competitions, some of which are sanctioned by DCI. However, the VFW Nationals and the American Legion National Championships are no longer hosted.

On March 25, 2020, in response to the coronavirus pandemic, member corps voted unanimously to cancel the 2020 competitive season.

== About ==
DCI is a 501(c)(3) organization governed by a board of directors, with an executive director responsible for day-to-day operations. The board of directors is composed of elected representatives from member corps (currently five), and three at-large members who are not affiliated with any corps and are "recruited, vetted and ratified for their unique business insights, qualifications and perspectives." The current chair of the board of directors is Jonathan Powell with Nate Boudreaux serving as executive director. In 2023, DCI's various programs and activities generated US$13.27 (equivalent to $14.02 in 2025) million in revenues.

Drum Corps Associates (DCA), a governing body for all-age or senior drum corps, is not affiliated with DCI, however the two organizations are strategic partners. DCI describes all-age corps as providing value to the drum corps activity, and permits all age corps to compete at sanctioned competitions. On May 31, 2023, DCI and DCA announced a partnership to create an All-Age Class for the 2024 and 2025 competitive seasons.

=== Mission ===
As the self-styled "Marching Music's Major League", DCI's mission is to create an environment for participating corps "to engage in education, competition, entertainment, and the promotion of individual growth." The organization also emphasizes positive life-transforming experiences for all participants.

=== Membership ===
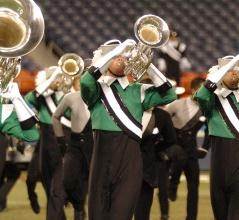
The Cavaliers Drum and Bugle Corps, a DCI World Class member corps and seven-time World Champion based in Rosemont, Illinois

Drum Corps International lists 51 members, as of the beginning of 2026. Of these, one is in Sherbrooke, Canada. The rest are based in the US, California being the best represented by far. Though DCI holds a world championship, international corps are ineligible. No events are scheduled outside the US in 2025.

To become a DCI member, or to maintain membership, a corps must pass an evaluation by the board of directors. The evaluation requires corps to submit data on their financial health, fundraising capacity and income, participants, staffing, and explanations of their administrative structure. All corps are required to be tax-exempt organizations.

Once approved by the board, a new corps must achieve certain competitive requirements, such as attending World Championships. The corps must then be approved by a majority of other members at a meeting following World Championships, usually the annual rules congress later in the year.

International corps, or corps based outside the United States and Canada, are also ineligible for membership. However, an international corps that adopts DCI's regulations, specifically instrumentation and participant age limits, may also qualify as a touring corps in either Open or World Class.

=== Age limit ===
DCI limits the age of participants for Open Class and World Class corps to "21 years of age and younger." A participant who is 22 years before June 1 is unable to compete. Some European and Asian drum corps associations have no age limit. Corps from those associations are allowed to compete at sanctioned competitions, and at World Championships in International Class.

Due to the cancellation of the 2020 DCI season caused by the COVID-19 pandemic, DCI extended their age-out limit by one year for the 2021 DCI season, making the age limit of participants to 22 years of age and younger. A 23 year old would also be eligible to march in 2021 if they were born on or after June 1. Member corps are allowed to set their own age limit to be younger than 21.

In 2024, the all-age corps of Drum Corps Associates (DCA) became DCI's All-Age Class. The All-Age championship moved to Indianapolis with the other DCI classes.

=== Marketing and broadcasts ===
Individual drum corps derive a large part of their revenues from marketing their product, specifically memorabilia and souvenir sales. DCI derives income from ticket sales, and is the sole distributor of official media, such as championship DVDs and audio CDs. DCI is also the exclusive producer of all broadcasts of sanctioned competitions, including online streaming. Edited versions of World Championship Open Class finals were televised by PBS from 1975 until 2004. (Note: World Championship Open Class finals from 1975 to 1991, and Division I finals from 1992 to 2005.) From 2005 to 2007, a two-hour highlights program of World Championship Division I finals was broadcast by ESPN2.

Since 2004, World Championship World Class prelims have been broadcast to movie theaters by Fathom Events under the title Big, Loud & Live. (Note: Prior to 2011, Open Class quarterfinals performances were broadcast. From 2011 onward, performances from the preliminary "all-skate" were broadcast.) In 2011, Fathom Events added the DCI Tour Premiere. DCI previously livestreamed a number of competitions throughout the season, including the entirety of World Championship, via the former "DCI FanNetwork," which operated from 2009 until 2015. Beginning in the 2017 season, FloSports engaged in a multi-year agreement to livestream select competitions via the FloMarching platform. Frequent hosts of the broadcasts and streaming events include former WWAY news anchor Steve Rondinaro, and percussionist Dennis DeLucia.

=== Other programs ===
In 2013, DCI launched two new competitive musical activities for small groups: SoundSport and DrumLine Battle. These activities are not restricted by an age limit, nor do they have the same competitive requirements as drum corps. BANDtastic! began in 2014.

==== SoundSport ====
The stated goal of SoundSport is to provide a competitive performance experience in a low-cost, local setting. Musical ensembles of five or more members, using any musical instruments, perform a 5-7 minute marching music show in an area measuring 30 yards (27 m) × 20 yards (18 m).

Two SoundSport teams Guardians and Watchmen became Open Class member corps in the 2014. Southwind, inactive from 2007 to 2013, competed as a SoundSport team in 2014, and returned to competition as an Open Class member in 2015. Rogues Hollow Regiment was "Best of Show" at the 2019 SoundSport International Music & Food Festival before joining Drum Corps Associates. In 2025, two corps, Memphis Blues and Zephyrus, were transitioning from SoundSport to Open Class, while two more, Minnesota Brass (also known as MBI) and Northern Lights were transitioning from SoundSport to All Age Class.

==== DrumLine Battle ====
Intended for drumlines, or battery percussion ensembles with no wheeled percussion. Competing drumlines are staged in two competitive zones opposite each other, with each demonstrating their skills as an ensemble in alternating rounds of two minutes each. Adjudicators do not restrict their evaluation to technical proficiency, and include showmanship and audience reaction.

In 2014, E-Sarn from Thailand, competed in the DrumLine Battle held during World Championship week, defeating fifteen other competitors. River City Rhythm, from Anoka, Minnesota, also competed in 2014, becoming a touring corps in 2015.

==== BANDtastic! ====
BANDtastic is a program of middle school honor bands sponsored by DCI. The program originated in 2013 with the Indiana "INpact" honor band, organized in conjunction with World Championships. Similar groups have since been organized in Georgia, Tennessee, Texas, Florida, and most recently Minnesota.

The activities are held in conjunction with a local DCI competition, and World Class corps partner.

=== World Championships ===
The week-long championship have been hosted at college or professional sports arenas in eighteen U.S. cities and Montreal. Since 2009, World Class Championships have been hosted at Lucas Oil Stadium in Indianapolis, Indiana. In 2015, DCI announced World Championships would remain in Indianapolis through 2028. In 2023, DCI and Visit Indy announced that they extended the contract through 2033. Championships were traditionally held the third week of August. However, the second week of August has been the preferred date due to trends in scholastic and collegiate schedules which pushed the start of the school year from early-September to late-August. (Note: Drum corps are housed at middle schools and high schools over night, and often rehearse on school grounds prior to competitions.)

In 2009 and 2010, the Open Class preliminary competition was hosted at Ames Field in Michigan City, Indiana with semifinals and finals hosted at Lucas Oil Stadium. From 2011 to 2018 the Open Class preliminaries and finals were hosted at Ames Field. Open Class Championship was moved to Wildcat Stadium on the campus of Indiana Wesleyan University in Marion, Indiana in 2019.

DrumLine Battle and SoundSport competitions were added to the week's activities in 2014.

==== Past championships locations ====
Year	Venue
1972–1973	Warhawk Stadium; University of Wisconsin–Whitewater; Whitewater, Wisconsin
1974	Schoellkopf Field; Cornell University; Ithaca, New York
1975–1976	Franklin Field; University of Pennsylvania; Philadelphia, Pennsylvania
1977–1978	Mile High Stadium; Denver, Colorado
1979–1980	Legion Field; Birmingham, Alabama
1981–1982	Stade olympique Montreal, Canada
1983	Miami Orange Bowl; Miami, Florida
1984	Grant Field; Georgia Tech; Atlanta, Georgia
1985–1987	Camp Randall Stadium; University of Wisconsin; Madison, Wisconsin
1988–1989	Arrowhead Stadium; Kansas City, Missouri
1990	Rich Stadium; Orchard Park, New York
1991	Cotton Bowl; Dallas, Texas
1992	Camp Randall Stadium; Madison, Wisconsin
1993	Veterans Memorial Stadium; Jackson, Mississippi
1994	Foxboro Stadium; Foxborough, Massachusetts
1995	Rich Stadium; Orchard Park, New York
1996–1998	Florida Citrus Bowl; Orlando, Florida
1999	Camp Randall Stadium; Madison, Wisconsin
2000	Byrd Stadium; University of Maryland; College Park, Maryland
2001	Ralph Wilson Stadium; Orchard Park, New York
2002	Camp Randall Stadium; Madison, Wisconsin
2003	Florida Citrus Bowl; Orlando, Florida
2004	Invesco Field; Denver, Colorado
2005	Gillette Stadium; Foxborough, Massachusetts
2006	Camp Randall Stadium; Madison, Wisconsin
2007	Rose Bowl; Pasadena, California
2008	Memorial Stadium; Indiana University; Bloomington, Indiana
2009–present	Lucas Oil Stadium; Indianapolis, Indiana

==== Individual & Ensemble (I&E) ====
The Individual & ensemble festival, also known as I&E, is also hosted near the championship site. Participants from all member corps are eligible to compete demonstrating their ability on their preferred instrument, or as part of a small ensemble or instrument choir. Color guard and dance categories are also available. In 2005, I&E was expanded to include woodwind and vocal categories.

Due to the COVID-19 pandemic, all I&E events were shifted to a digital format in 2020 and 2021. No I&E festival has taken place, in any format, since 2022.

== Classification and adjudication ==
DCI utilizes a single adjudication handbook with corps subdivided by size, and not skill level. A multi-tier classification and adjudication system was in use prior to 2008, with Division I and Division II / III utilizing different handbooks, while also being subdivided by size.

=== Current classes ===
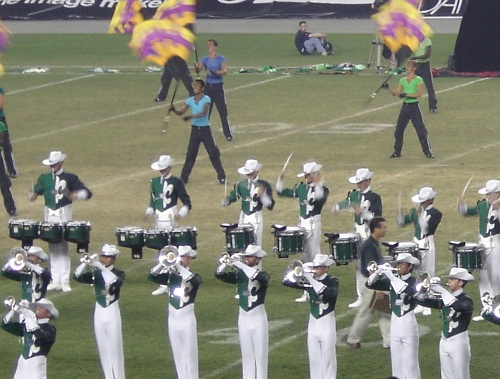
The Madison Scouts Drum and Bugle Corps, a DCI World Class corps and two-time World Champion based in Madison, Wisconsin

Currently, DCI groups corps from the United States and Canada into three classes based on competitive level. Corps from Europe, Asia, Latin America, and anywhere other than the U.S. and Canada are grouped into the International Class. Corps from all classes compete together but are ranked separately. In the past, classes have been fully or partially determined by the number of marching members in each corps; at present, all corps may march up to a maximum of one hundred sixty five (165) members.

World Class (formerly Division I) corps are the groups that have chosen to compete at the highest level and have proven to DCI leadership they have the ability to survive at this level both competitively and financially. The higher a corps is ranked at the DCI Championships, the higher the performance fees they will earn for the following season's performances.

Open Class (formerly Divisions II & III) corps are committed to a lesser competitive level and are generally smaller, although several corps have marched with maximum membership. In September 2007, DCI combined the former Divisions II and III into this new class.

International Class is for corps based outside the U.S. and Canada who wish to compete at sanctioned competitions. Corps in this class are allowed to follow the guidelines of their national governing body, such as: no age restrictions, smaller membership requirements, or the use of woodwind instruments. International corps which abide by DCI rules would be eligible to compete as Open or World Class corps.

All-Age Class is class available to all corps whose members do not meet DCI's age limits. A competitive All-Age Class and All-Age Class Championships were made available for the 2024 and 2025 seasons in partnership with DCA. As of June 2026, DCA-member corps continue to compete at DCI events.

==== Historic classes and divisions ====
1972–1974	1975–1982	1983–1984	1985–1988	1988–1991	1992–2007	2008–2023	2024–present
Open Class	Open Class				Division I	World Class	
Open Class	Class A	Class A	Class A		Division II	Open Class	Open Class
Open Class	All-Girl	Class A	Class A60		Division III	Open Class	All-Age Class
Open Class				International Class			

==== Member limits ====
- From 1972 to 1992, Open Class corps were limited to 128 members.
- Class A corps generally had 90 or fewer members, however the membership limit was 128.
- All-Girl Class was restricted to girls only; there was no equivalent all-boy class.
- Class A60, and the later Division III, required between 15 and 60 members. Between 2004 and 2007 all Division III corps were required to march between 30 and 60 members.
- From 1992 to 2007, Division II had the same membership limit as Division I, however few corps reach this limit.
- In 2004, the Division I membership limit was increased from 128 to 135.
- The membership limit for World Class, the new Open Class, and International Class was increased to 150 in 2007.
- In 2018, the membership limit per corps was increased to 154.
- In 2022, the membership limit per corps was increased to 165. Due to the size of the corps, all on-field judges were limited to the sidelines.
- In 2024, the All-Age class limit was set to 128 members with its inclusion in DCI, the same as it had been with DCA.

=== Adjudication ===
DCI's Adjudication Manual is based on three broad categories, Visual, Music and Effect. Visual and Music categories are further subdivided into three analysis captions. If more than one adjudicator is utilized in any caption, their scores are averaged before being factored. All-age corps may request to be adjudicated using scoring sheets provided by DCA. Before the creation of the DCI All-Age Class, any All-age corps were able to compete exclusively at DCI sanctioned competitions prior to attending the DCA World Championships, which was traditionally hosted on or before Labor Day weekend.

Category	Caption		Caption		Points
Music	Brass (20) / 2	+	Music Analysis (20) / 2	=	30.00
Music	Percussion (20) / 2	+	Music Analysis (20) / 2	=	30.00
Visual	Color Guard (20) / 2	+	Visual Analysis (20) / 2	=	30.00
Visual	Visual Proficiency (20) / 2	+	Visual Analysis (20) / 2	=	30.00
Effect	General Effect 1 (20)	+	General Effect 2 (20)	=	40.00
			Subtotal		100.00
			Timing & Penalties		0.00
			Total		100.00

== Past champions ==
Below is a list of past champions organized by class. DCI realigned its class structure in 1992, and again in 2008. DCI does not record or announce de facto champions.

Year	Open Class	—	—	—
1972 (1st)	Anaheim Kingsmen (California)			
1973 (2nd)	Santa Clara Vanguard (California)			
1974 (3rd)	Santa Clara Vanguard ^{(2)}			
Year	Open Class	A Class	All-Girl	—
1975 (4th)	Madison Scouts (Wisconsin)	Cadets of Greece (New York)	St. Ignatius (New York)	
1976 (5th)	Blue Devils (California)	Wausau Story (Wisconsin)	St. Ignatius ^{(2)}	
1977 (6th)	Blue Devils ^{(2)}	Bengal Lancers (Connecticut)	St. Ignatius ^{(3)}	
1978 (7th)	Santa Clara Vanguard ^{(3)}	Black Watch (Note: The 1978 Class A Champions Black Watch was also known as Black Watch Highland Regiment.) (Washington)	Les Châtelaines (Quebec)	
1979 (8th)	Blue Devils ^{(3)}	Black Watch (New Jersey)	Arbella (Massachusetts)	
1980 (9th)	Blue Devils ^{(4)}	Ventures (Note: In 1980, Class A and All-Girl Class Championships were combined. Only one champion was announced.) (Ontario)		
1981 (10th)	Santa Clara Vanguard ^{(4)}	Southernaires (Louisiana)	Les Châtelaines ^{(2)}	
1982 (11th)	Blue Devils ^{(5)}	Dutch Boy (Ontario)	Les Châtelaines ^{(3)}	
Year	Open Class	A Class	—	—
1983 (12th)	Garfield Cadets (New Jersey)	Les Châtelaines		
1984 (13th)	Garfield Cadets ^{(2)}	Florida Wave (Florida)		
Year	Open Class	A Class	A60 Class	—
1985 (14th)	Garfield Cadets ^{(3)}	Ventures ^{(2)}	St. Francis Xavier Sancians (Massachusetts)	
1986 (15th)	Blue Devils ^{(6)}	Canadian Knights (Ontario)	St. Francis Xavier Sancians ^{(2)}	
1987 (16th)	Garfield Cadets ^{(4)}	Ventures ^{(3)}	Mandarins (California)	
Year	Open Class	A Class	A60 Class	International Class (Note: Prior to 1988, international corps competed in Open Class or Class A.)
1988 (17th)	Madison Scouts ^{(2)}	L'Insolites (Quebec)	Mandarins ^{(2)}	British Crusaders (Note: Dagenham Crusaders of Dagenham (U.K.) competed in Open Class as the British Crusaders and were named the 1988 International Class Champion, ahead of the Blue Eagles of Basildon (U.K.), who competed in Class A at 1998 World Championships.) (United Kingdom)
1989 (18th)	Santa Clara Vanguard ^{(5)}	Ventures ^{(4)}	Blue Stars (Wisconsin)	No champion
1990 (19th)	Cadets of Bergen County ^{(5)} (previously the Garfield Cadets)	Ventures ^{(5)}	Academie Musicale (Quebec)	West Coast Cadets (United Kingdom)
1991 (20th)	Star of Indiana (Indiana)	Southwind (Alabama)	Pioneer (Wisconsin)	No champion
Year	Division I	Division II	Division III	International Class
1992 (21st)	The Cavaliers (Illinois)	Southwind ^{(2)}	Mandarins ^{(3)}	SGI Fuji (Note: SGI Fugi Drum & Bugle Corps is an evangelical outreach program of Soka Gakkai International.) (Japan)
1993 (22nd)	Cadets of Bergen County ^{(6)}	Carolina Crown (North Carolina)	Blue Stars ^{(2)}	Phoenix Regiment (Japan)
1994 (23rd)	Blue Devils ^{(7)}	Pioneer (Wisconsin)	Americanos	Pride of Bristol (United Kingdom)
1995 (24th)	The Cavaliers ^{(2)}	Pioneer ^{(2)}	Academie Musicale (Quebec)	Bay Max (Japan)
1996 (25th)	Blue Devils ^{(8)} (tie); Phantom Regiment (Illinois)	Les Etoiles Dorion Vaudreuil (Quebec)	Mandarins ^{(4)}	Yokohama Scouts (Japan)
1997 (26th)	Blue Devils ^{(9)}	Spartans (New Hampshire)	Mandarins ^{(5)}	Pride of SOKA (Note: Pride of SOKA Drum & Bugle Corps is affiliated with Sōka University in Hachiōji, Japan.) (Japan)
1998 (27th)	Cadets of Bergen County ^{(7)}	East Coast Jazz (Massachusetts) (tie); Spartans ^{(2)}	Mandarins ^{(6)}	No champion
1999 (28th)	Blue Devils ^{(10)} (tie); Santa Clara Vanguard ^{(6)}	Patriots (New York)	Mandarins ^{(7)}	Yokohama Scouts ^{(2)}
2000 (29th)	The Cadets ^{(8)} (previously the Cadets of Bergen County) (tie); The Cavaliers ^{(3)}	Vanguard Cadets (California)	Seattle Cascades (Washington)	Taipei Yuehfu (Taiwan)
2001 (30th)	The Cavaliers ^{(4)}	Mandarins (California)	Blue Stars ^{(3)}	Taipei Yuehfu ^{(2)}
2002 (31st)	The Cavaliers ^{(5)}	Magic of Orlando (Florida)	Revolution (Texas)	Taipei Yuehfu ^{(3)}
2003 (32nd)	Blue Devils ^{(11)}	Esperanza (California)	Blue Stars ^{(4)}	No champion
2004 (33rd)	The Cavaliers ^{(6)}	Spartans ^{(3)} (Division II / III Grand Champion)	Oregon Crusaders (Oregon)	Beatrix (Netherlands)
2005 (34th)	The Cadets ^{(9)}	Spartans ^{(4)} (Division II Champion) East Coast Jazz (Division II / III Grand Champion)	Raiders (New Jersey)	Taipei Yuehfu ^{(4)}
2006 (35th)	The Cavaliers ^{(7)}	The Academy (Arizona)	Impulse (California)	Jubal (Netherlands)
2007 (36th)	Blue Devils ^{(12)}	Spartans ^{(5)}	Memphis Sound (Tennessee)	Yokohama Scouts ^{(3)}
Year	World Class	Open Class	—	International Class
2008 (37th)	Phantom Regiment ^{(2)}	Vanguard Cadets ^{(2)}		Beatrix ^{(2)}
2009 (38th)	Blue Devils ^{(13)}	Blue Devils B (California)		No champion
2010 (39th)	Blue Devils ^{(14)}	Blue Devils B ^{(2)}		Strängnäs (Sweden)
2011 (40th)	The Cadets ^{(10)}	Blue Devils B ^{(3)}		Yokohama Scouts ^{(4)}
2012 (41st)	Blue Devils ^{(15)}	Oregon Crusaders (Oregon)		No champion
2013 (42nd)	Carolina Crown (South Carolina)	Vanguard Cadets ^{(3)}		Taipei Yuehfu ^{(5)}
2014 (43rd)	Blue Devils ^{(16)}	Blue Devils B ^{(4)}		Patria (Guatemala)
2015 (44th)	Blue Devils ^{(17)}	Vanguard Cadets ^{(4)}		Jubal ^{(2)}
2016 (45th)	Bluecoats (Ohio)	Blue Devils B ^{(5)}		No champion
2017 (46th)	Blue Devils ^{(18)}	Vanguard Cadets ^{(5)}		The Company (United Kingdom)
2018 (47th)	Santa Clara Vanguard ^{(7)}	Vanguard Cadets ^{(6)}		Jubal ^{(3)}
2019 (48th)	Blue Devils ^{(19)}	Spartans ^{(6)}		No champion
2020 (—)	Championships cancelled (Note: The 2020 competitive season was cancelled in response to the coronavirus pandemic.)			No champion
2021 (49th)	Non-competitive showcase only.			No champion
2022 (50th)	Blue Devils ^{(20)}	Vanguard Cadets ^{(7)}		Calgary Stampede Showband (Alberta)
2023 (51st)	Blue Devils ^{(21)}	Spartans ^{(7)}		No champion
Year	World Class	Open Class	All-Age Class	International Class
2024 (52nd)	Bluecoats ^{(2)}	Spartans ^{(8)}	Reading Buccaneers (Pennsylvania)	No champion
2025 (53rd)	Boston Crusaders (Massachusetts)	Spartans ^{(9)}	Reading Buccaneers ^{(2)}	The Stampede ^{(2)} (previously the Calgary; Stampede Showband)
2026 (54th)	Bluecoats ^{(3)}	Blue Devils B ^{(6)}	Reading Buccaneers ^{(3)}	Mercedes Marching Band (Costa Rica)

=== All-Age division champions ===
All-Age Class divisions are based on ensemble size, and are similar to class alignments developed by Drum Corps Associates. As of October 2024, the All-Age divisions were as follows:

- All-Age A Class – 40 to 60 members
- All-Age Open Class – 61 to 85 members
- All-Age World Class – 86 to 128 members.

Division championship awards are distinct from the All-Age Class Champion award above.

Year	World Class	Open Class	A Class
2024 (52nd)	Reading Buccaneers (Pennsylvania)	Cincinnati Tradition (Ohio)	Govenaires (Minnesota)
2025 (53rd)	Reading Buccaneers ^{(2)}	Cincinnati Tradition ^{(2)}	Govenaires ^{(2)}
2026 (54th)	Reading Buccaneers ^{(3)}	Cincinnati Tradition ^{(3)}	Govenaires ^{(3)}

== See also ==
- Drum Corps Associates
- Winter Guard International
- Bands of America
