= William Steffe =

American songwriter and businessman (c. 1830 – c. 1890)

- Born: c. 1830; South Carolina, U.S.
- Died: c. 1890 (aged 59–60)
- Occupations: Bookkeeper; insurance agent
- Known for: Collecting and editing the tune for the traditional "Glory Hallelujah" refrain

The Battle Hymn of the Republic
"The Battle Hymn of the Republic", performed by Frank C. Stanley, Elise Stevenson, and a mixed quartet in 1908.

The Battle Hymn of the Republic
"The Battle Hymn of the Republic", Modern Jazz arrangement arranged by Eric Richards, performed by United States Air Force Band Airmen of Note.

William Steffe (c. 1830 – c. 1890) was a Philadelphia bookkeeper and insurance agent. He is credited with collecting and editing the musical tune for a camp-meeting song with the traditional "Glory Hallelujah" refrain, in about 1856. It opened with "Say, brothers, will you meet us / on Canaan's happy shore?" The tune became widely known.

== Early life ==
Steffe was born c. 1830 in South Carolina.

== Career ==
Early in the American Civil War, this tune was used to create the Union army marching song "John Brown's Body", which begins with the lyrics "John Brown's body lies a-mouldering in the grave, but his soul goes marching on."

In November 1861, Julia Ward Howe, having heard this version, used the tune as the basis of her new verse, later known as "The Battle Hymn of the Republic".
