= Donald Grantham =

American composer and music educator (born 1947)

Donald Grantham (born November 9, 1947) is an American composer and music educator.

Grantham was born in Duncan, Oklahoma. After receiving a Bachelor of Music from the University of Oklahoma, he received his MM and DMA from the University of Southern California. For two summers he studied under French composer and pedagogue Nadia Boulanger at the American Conservatory in France. His music has won many awards, including the Prix Lili Boulanger, the ASCAP Rudolf Nissim Prize, and First Prize in the National Opera Association's Biennial Composition Competition. Grantham is the recipient of a Guggenheim Fellowship and three separate grants from the National Endowment for the Arts. The symphony orchestras of Atlanta, Cleveland, and Dallas are among the ensembles that have performed his work. He also collaborated with fellow composer Kent Kennan on the textbook The Technique of Orchestration.

Grantham teaches music composition at the University of Texas at Austin Butler School of Music, where he is the Frank C. Erwin, Jr. Centennial Professor of Music.

Well-known pieces include Southern Harmony and Kentucky Harmony for band. His most famous piece is Baron Cimetiere's Mambo.
