= Santa Clara Vanguard Drum and Bugle Corps =

Junior drum and bugle corps based in Santa Clara, California

- Location: Santa Clara, California
- Division: World Class
- Founded: 1967
- Director: Gio Bastante
- Championship titles: American Legion: 1970; CYO: 1983; VFW: 1971; DCI: 1973; 1974; 1978; 1981; 1989; 1999 (tie); 2018
- Website: www.scvanguard.org

SCV 50th anniversary logo, 2017

Santa Clara Vanguard Drum and Bugle Corps is a competitive drum and bugle corps, based in Santa Clara, California. The Santa Clara Vanguard is one of the thirteen founding member corps of Drum Corps International (DCI) and a seven time DCI World Champion, winning the title most recently in 2018.

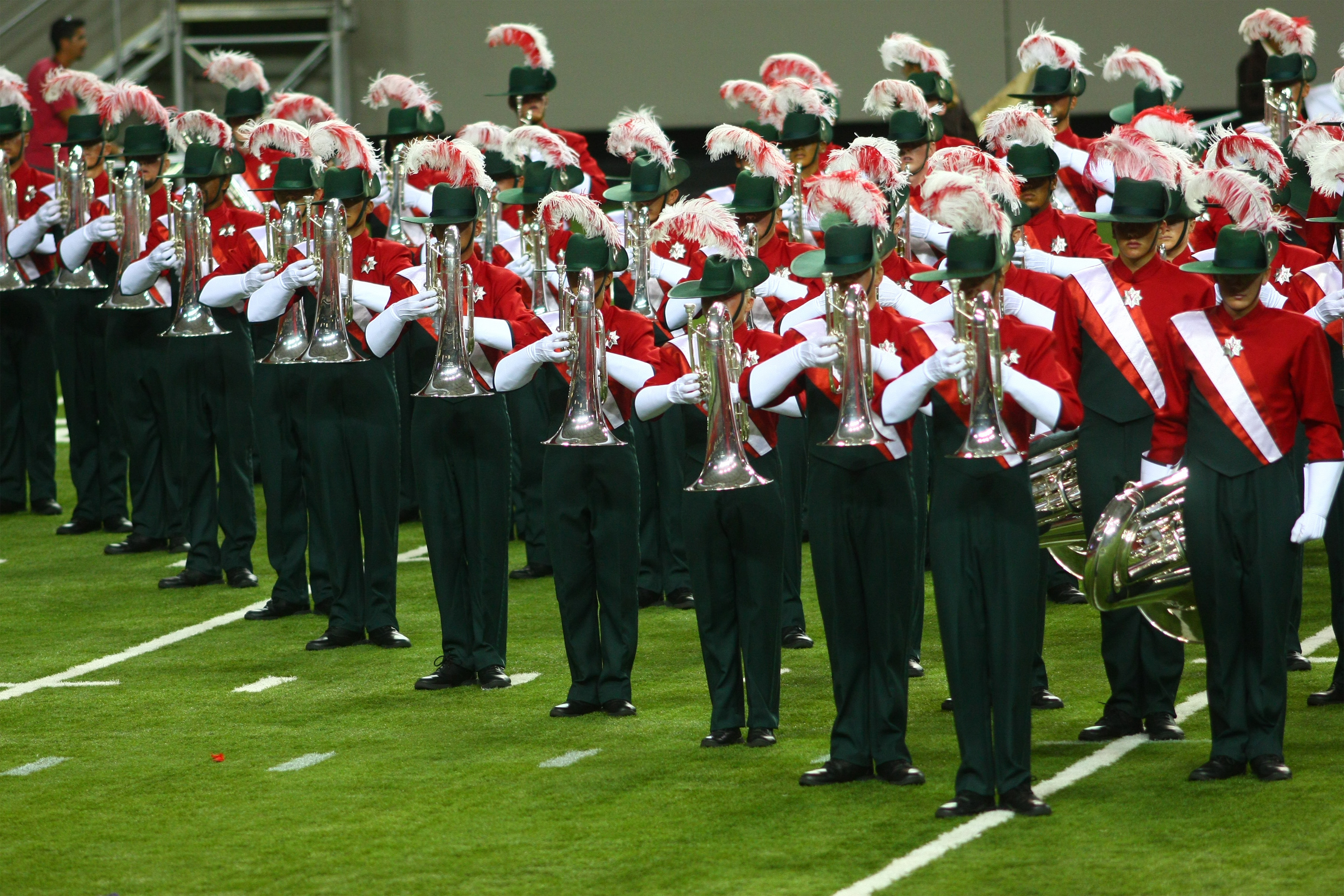
The Santa Clara Vanguard in 2008

== History ==
In March 1967, citing differences of opinion in the artistic direction of the Sparks Drum and Bugle Corps, its parents support group voted to return the corps to its former activity as a drum and lyre corps with majorettes. After the vote, three adults took members aside and asked them if they would prefer to continue as a drum and bugle corps or to return to a drum and lyre corps. After the members chose a drum and bugle corps, their parents immediately started a new booster club to support the new corps. They waited until its members met for rehearsal the following week to select a name. After discussing and rejecting several possible names, the corps chose Santa Clara Vanguard. Gail Royer, a local elementary school music teacher and instructor for the Sparks, was named as the director for the new corps.

In 1968, the corps embarked on its first tour to the Midwest. Although they did not place high at any of the competitions, the tour was a success because of the experience and exposure to the national drum corps scene. The corps also won its first field show that year in August 1968, at the Anaheim Kingsmen's Festival of Music. Santa Clara Vanguard capped off its year by winning the first of many California State Open Championships.

In 1971, the Blue Stars, Cavaliers, Madison Scouts, Santa Clara Vanguard, and the Troopers formed the Midwest Combine. This action was taken in reaction to the rigid rules of the American Legion and VFW and the low or nonexistent performance fees paid for appearing in the various competitions. The corps felt that not only were they having their creative potential as artistic performing groups stifled, but they were being financially starved. A similar group of eastern corps, the United Organization of Junior Corps (also known as the "Alliance"), was formed by the 27th Lancers, Garfield Cadets, Boston Crusaders, Blessed Sacrament Golden Knights, and Blue Rock. The Combine members felt that the corps should be making their own rules, operating their own competitions and championships, and keeping the bulk of the proceeds that those shows earned. For the 1971 season, the corps stuck together, offering show promoters the five corps as a package. Despite pressure on show sponsors, judges, and other drum corps, the Combine was a success.

In 1972, the Santa Clara Vanguard, along with the nine other corps from the Midwest Combine and the Alliance, plus the Anaheim Kingsmen, Argonne Rebels, and De La Salle Oaklands were the founding members of Drum Corps International. At the first DCI World Championships in Whitewater, Wisconsin, Santa Clara Vanguard finished in third place. Santa Clara would remain among DCI's top three corps for the organization's first eight years, winning the World Championships in 1973, 1974, 1978.

Santa Clara Vanguard won its fourth DCI World Championship in 1981. Over the next seven years, Santa Clara Vanguard never placed below third before winning its fifth DCI title in 1989. They won their sixth DCI World Championship in 1999 and their seventh in 2018.

Since Drum Corps International's founding in 1972, Santa Clara Vanguard had been the only corps to appear as a finalist in every World Championship, until in December 2022, Vanguard Music & Performing Arts announced that the Santa Clara Vanguard Drum & Bugle Corps would be placed on hiatus for the 2023 season due to multiple financial issues from the previous season. On September 8, 2023, Santa Clara Vanguard confirmed their plans to return for the 2024 season, alongside the announcement of their management team, design team, and their new CEO, Dr. Russell Gavin.

== Show summary (1972–2026) ==
Key
Pale blue background indicates DCI World Class Finalist (Note: From 1972-1991, Santa Clara Vanguard competed in Open Class; from 1992-2007 in Division I, and since 2008 in World Class. These are the same tier, just renamed.)
Dark gold background indicates DCI World Class Champion

Year	Repertoire	Score	Placement
1972	Fanfare and Allegro by Clifton Williams / Henry V by Sir William Walton / Now Thank We All Our God by Johann Crüger, Martin Rinkart & Catherine Winkworth / Wedding Celebration, The Bottle Dance, If I Were A Rich Man & Chava Ballet Sequence (from Fiddler on the Roof) by Jerry Bock & Sheldon Harnick	87.35	3rd Place; Open Class; Finalist
1973	Fanfare and Allegro by Clifton Williams / Young Person's Guide To the Orchestra by Benjamin Britten / Wedding Celebration, The Bottle Dance & Chava Ballet Sequence (from Fiddler on the Roof) by Jerry Bock & Sheldon Harnick	88.65	1st Place; Open Class; Champion
1974	Siegfried's Rhine Journey (from Götterdämmerung) by Richard Wagner / Young Person's Guide To the Orchestra by Benjamin Britten / Overture to Candide by Leonard Bernstein / A Little Night Music, Weekend in the Country & Send In the Clowns (from A Little Night Music) by Stephen Sondheim / The Bottle Dance (from Fiddler on the Roof) by Jerry Bock & Sheldon Harnick	89.50	1st Place; Open Class; Champion
1975	Entrance of the Emperor and His Court (from the Hary Janos Suite) by Zoltán Kodály / Dance of the Buffoons by Nikolai Rimsky-Korsakov / To Life, If I Were A Rich Man, Sabbath Prayer, Chava Ballet & The Bottle Dance (from Fiddler on the Roof) by Jerry Bock & Sheldon Harnick	91.00	2nd Place; Open Class; Finalist
1976	Hary Janos Suite by Zoltán Kodály / Appalachian Spring by Aaron Copland / Black Orchid by Neal Hefti / Send In the Clowns (from A Little Night Music) by Stephen Sondheim	89.50	3rd Place; Open Class; Finalist
1977	Overture to a New Era by Caesar Giovannini / Appalachian Spring by Aaron Copland / Overture to Candide & Make Our Garden Grow (from Candide) by Leonard Bernstein	89.85	3rd Place; Open Class; Finalist
1978	Overture to a New Era by Caesar Giovannini / Dance of Welcome, Adagio, Lezghinka & Hopak (from Gayane) by Aram Khachaturian / If You Believe (from The Wiz) by Charlie Smalls / The Bottle Dance (from Fiddler on the Roof) by Jerry Bock & Sheldon Harnick	91.55	1st Place; Open Class; Champion
1979	Verdi's Requiem by Giuseppe Verdi / Adagio, Lezghinka & Hopak (from Gayane) by Aram Khachaturian / If You Believe (from The Wiz) by Charlie Smalls / The Bottle Dance (from Fiddler on the Roof) by Jerry Bock & Sheldon Harnick	90.70	3rd Place; Open Class; Finalist
1980	Fanfare Symphony No. 4 Opus 36 by Pyotr Ilyich Tchaikovsky / Procession of the Nobles by Nikolai Rimsky-Korsakov / Stone Ground Seven by Roger Kellaway / Selections from Evita by Andrew Lloyd Webber & Tim Rice / Jupiter (from The Planets) by Gustav Holst	85.60	7th Place; Open Class; Finalist
1981	Northridge by David Schafer / Young Person's Guide To the Orchestra by Benjamin Britten / Slava by Leonard Bernstein / Don't Cry For Me Argentina (from Evita) by Andrew Lloyd Webber & Tim Rice	94.00	1st Place; Open Class; Champion
1982	Third Symphony, Fourth Movement by Vittorio Giannini / Capriccio Espagnol by Nikolai Rimsky-Korsakov / Slava by Leonard Bernstein / Appalachian Spring by Aaron Copland / The Bottle Dance (from Fiddler on the Roof) by Jerry Bock & Sheldon Harnick	93.55	2nd Place; Open Class; Finalist
1983	Third Symphony, Fourth Movement by Vittorio Giannini / On the Town by Leonard Bernstein, Betty Comden & Adolph Green / Appalachian Spring & Dream Sequence (from The Red Pony) by Aaron Copland	92.75	3rd Place; Open Class; Finalist
1984	Fanfare and Allegro by Clifton Williams / Musika Bohema by Zdeněk Lukáš / On the Town by Leonard Bernstein, Betty Comden & Adolph Green / Tender Land by Aaron Copland	97.40	3rd Place; Open Class; Finalist
1985	Festive Overture by Dmitri Shostakovich / Grover's Corner (from Our Town), Tender Land & The Red Pony by Aaron Copland	97.20	2nd Place; Open Class; Finalist
1986	Festive Overture by Dmitri Shostakovich / Pictures at an Exhibition by Modest Mussorgsky	97.00	2nd Place; Open Class; Finalist
1987	Russian Christmas Music by Alfred Reed / Dance of the Tumblers by Nikolai Rimsky-Korsakov / Lezghinka & Lullaby (from Gayane) by Aram Khachaturian / Hut of Baba Yaga & The Great Gate of Kiev (from Pictures at an Exhibition) by Modest Mussorgsky	97.80	2nd Place; Open Class; Finalist
1988	Phantom of the Opera; Music of the Night, Angel of Music, Phantom of the Opera, Masquerade, Wishing You Were Somehow Here Again, Track Down This Murderer & All I Ask Of You; All from The Phantom of the Opera by Andrew Lloyd Webber	96.90	2nd Place; Open Class; Finalist
1989	Phantom of the Opera; Angel of Music, Masquerade, Think of Me, Wishing You Were Somehow Here Again, All I Ask Of You, Track Down This Murderer & Music of the Night; All from The Phantom of the Opera by Andrew Lloyd Webber	98.80	1st Place; Open Class; Champion
1990	Carmen; Prelude and March, Intermezzo, March of the Toreadors, Changing of the Guard, Allegro Moderato, La Habanera & Gypsy Dance; All from Carmen by Georges Bizet	94.00	6th Place; Open Class; Finalist
1991	Miss Saigon; Overture - What's This I Find?, Sun and Moon, Morning of the Dragon, Wedding Ceremony & The Fall of Saigon; All from Miss Saigon by Claude-Michel Schönberg, Alain Boublil & Richard Maltby Jr.	94.40	4th Place; Open Class; Finalist
1992	Fiddler on the Roof; Tradition, Sabbath Prayer, To Life, Chava Ballet, Wedding Celebration & The Bottle Dance; All from Fiddler on the Roof by Jerry Bock & Sheldon Harnick	91.80	7th Place; Division I Finalist
1993	Walton Trilogy; Johannesburg Festival Overture, Richard III & Agincourt Song (from Henry V); All by Sir William Walton	90.40	7th Place; Division I Finalist
1994	The Red Poppy; Hymn to Red October (from The Hunt for Red October) by Basil Poledouris / Triumphal Dance of the Coolies, Chinese Dances, Phoenix & Russian Sailor's Dance (from The Red Poppy) by Reinhold Glière / The Great Gate of Kiev (from Pictures at an Exhibition) by Modest Mussorgsky	92.30	5th Place; Division I Finalist
1995	Not the Nutcracker; The Clock Breaks by Pyotr Ilyich Tchaikovsky / War of the Nuts by Dave Carico / Romance and Seduction, Celebration & The Journey Concludes by Pyotr Ilyich Tchaikovsky	91.90	6th Place; Division I Finalist
1996	La Mer; La Mer, Mvt. 1 by Claude Debussy / Oceans by Goff Richards / The Skyboat (from Waterworld) by James Newton Howard / La Mer, Mvt. 3 by Claude Debussy	92.30	5th Place; Division I Finalist
1997	Fog City Sketches; Lonely Town & Pas de Deux (from On the Town) / Presto Barbaro & City Dreams (from On the Waterfront) / The Masque, Variation 14 Poco più vivace & The Epilogue (from Symphony No. 2: The Age of Anxiety); All by Leonard Bernstein	96.90	3rd Place; Division I Finalist
1998	Copland, The Modernist; Grohg, Dance Panels, Down a Country Lane, Hear Ye! Hear Ye! & Grohg, Part II; All by Aaron Copland	97.90	2nd Place; Division I Finalist
1999	Inventions for a New Millennium; The Canyon by Philip Glass / Symphony No. 2 & Symphony No. 1 by Samuel Barber / Blue Shades by Frank Ticheli	98.40	1st Place; Division I Champion (Note: In 1999, Santa Clara Vanguard and the Blue Devils tied for 1st place.)
2000	Age of Reverence; Prayers of Kierkegaard (Prayer No. 4) by Samuel Barber / String Quartet No. 4, Mvt. 5 & Piano Concerto No. 1, Mvt. 3 by Béla Bartók / Agnus Dei (Adagio for Strings) by Samuel Barber / Stained Glass, Mvt. 1 & 3 by David Gillingham	94.70	4th Place; Division I Finalist
2001	New Era Metropolis; The Alarm by Dean Westman & Jim Casella / Short Ride in a Fast Machine by John Adams / Jug Blues and Fat Pickin' by Don Freund / Variants on a Medieval Tune by Norman Dello Joio / New Era Dance by Aaron Jay Kernis	95.35	4th Place; Division I Finalist
2002	Sound, Shape, and Color; Trivandrum by Gordon Henderson / Symphony No. 2 by Howard Hanson / Symphony for Organ and Orchestra, Mvt. 2 & 3 by Aaron Copland	95.65	4th Place; Division I Finalist
2003	Pathways; Orawa (Part 1) by Wojciech Kilar / One Man Show by Jeff Beal / Anima Mundi by Richard Danielpour / Orawa (Part 2) by Wojciech Kilar	94.70	5th Place; Division I Finalist
2004	Attraction: The Music of Scheherazade; Selections from Scheherazade by Nikolai Rimsky-Korsakov	96.825	3rd Place; Division I Finalist
2005	Russia: Revolution - Evolution 1917 - 1991; Carol (from Russian Christmas Music) by Alfred Reed / Symphony No. 12 by Dmitri Shostakovich / Cathedral Chorus (from Russian Christmas Music) by Alfred Reed	88.65	8th Place; Division I Finalist
2006	Moto Perpetuo; Chains of Reaction, Newton's Cradle, Echoes of Time & Speed of Sight; All from Moto Perpetuo by Key Poulan	92.35	6th Place; Division I Finalist
2007	! (Eureka); Introduction & War Dance (from Daphnis et Chloé) & String Quartet in F Major, Mvt. 2 by Maurice Ravel / Romanian Dance for Orchestra, Sz. 47a by Béla Bartók / St. Gregory the Great (from Church Windows) by Ottorino Respighi / Finale (from Daphnis et Chloé) by Maurice Ravel	94.175	5th Place; Division I Finalist
2008	3HREE Mind, Body and Soul; The Chairman Dances (Foxtrot for Orchestra) by John Adams / The Man in the Bath by Philip Glass / Eclipse by Talvin Singh / Cloudburst by Eric Whitacre	93.025	7th Place; World Class; Finalist
2009	Ballet For Martha; Appalachian Spring by Aaron Copland	95.65	5th Place; World Class; Finalist
2010	Bartók; Concerto for Orchestra & Music for Strings, Percussion, and Celesta by Béla Bartók	92.00	7th Place; World Class; Finalist
2011	The Devil's Staircase; First Essay for Orchestra by Samuel Barber / Piano Sonata No. 2, Mvt. 2 by Avner Dorman / The Eternal Knot by Karl Jenkins / Etude 13: The Devil's Staircase by György Ligeti	92.20	6th Place; World Class; Finalist
2012	Music of the Starry Night; Leonardo Dreams of His Flying Machine by Eric Whitacre / Hymn to a Blue Hour by John Mackey / Jupiter & Mars (from The Planets) by Gustav Holst / Music of The Night (from The Phantom of the Opera) by Andrew Lloyd Webber	94.45	5th Place; World Class; Finalist
2013	Les Misérables; Look Down, At the End of the Day, On My Own, Castle on a Cloud, One Day More, I Dreamed a Dream, Attack on the Rue Plumet, Red and Black, Bring Him Home & Do You Hear the People Sing? All from Les Misérables by Claude-Michel Schönberg, Alain Boublil, Jean-Marc Natel & Herbert Kretzmer	96.85	4th Place; World Class; Finalist
2014	Scheherazade: Words 2 Live By; Selections from Scheherazade by Nikolai Rimsky-Korsakov	96.075	4th Place; World Class; Finalist
2015	The Spark of Invention; Invention in A Minor by Johann Sebastian Bach / Virus Attack by Amin Bhatia / Pure Imagination by Leslie Bricusse & Anthony Newley / Piano Concerto by John Corigliano	93.850	5th Place; World Class; Finalist
2016	Force of Nature; Spring 1 (from Recomposed) by Max Richter / Without Warning by Stephen Melillo / Earth Song by Frank Ticheli / Winter 1 (from Recomposed) by Max Richter / After the Storm by Stephen Melillo	95.300	4th Place; World Class; Finalist
2017	Ouroboros; Interplay for Piano Four Hands and Orchestra by David Gillingham / The Triumph of Time by Peter Graham / Song of Eight Unruly Tipsy Poets by Zhou Long / Into a Virtual World by Amin Bhatia / Remembering the Future (from Wait of the World) by Stephen Melillo	97.600	2nd Place; World Class; Finalist
2018	Babylon; My Body Is a Cage by Arcade Fire, adapted by Peter Gabriel / Journey to the Centre of the Earth & Metropolis 1927 by Peter Graham / Apology by Zacarías M. de la Riva / Club Sound by Billy Bennett & Long Phung (Gent and Jawns)	98.625	1st Place; World Class; Champion
2019	Vox Eversio; Fraternity by Thierry Deleruyelle / Audivi Media Nocte by Oliver Waespi / Nothing Else Matters by James Hetfield & Lars Ulrich (Metallica) / Rise Up by Paul & Sandi Rennick	96.600	3rd Place; World Class; Finalist
2020	Season canceled due to the COVID-19 pandemic		
2021	Wait For Me; Original music by Galen Hooks (Santa Clara Vanguard did not perform live at DCI events in 2021)	No scored competitions	
2022	Finding Nirvana; String Quartet No. 1 (Metamorphoses Nocturnes) - Presto by György Ligeti / Breakfast in Baghdad by Ulf Wakenius / Mata Hari by Al Di Meola / Smells Like Teen Spirit by Nirvana / Ambergris March by Björk / Territorial Pissings by Nirvana	95.000	5th Place; World Class; Finalist
2023	Corps inactive		
2024	Vagabond; United in Grief by Kendrick Lamar / The All-Seeing Sky by John Psathas / With Reckless Abandon by Mikael Karlsson / Mirrorball by Peter Gabriel	93.925	6th Place; World Class; Finalist
2025	The aVANt GUARD; Fratres by Arvo Pärt / 3 Hallucinations: No. 3: Ritual by John Corigliano / String Quartet No. 4 Mvmt IV by Béla Bartók / Epitaph for Moonlight by R. Murray Schafer / Home With You by FKA Twigs / View From Olympus No. 3: Maenads by John Psathas / Send In the Clowns (from A Little Night Music) by Stephen Sondheim	96.700	3rd Place; World Class; Finalist
2026	With Reckless Abandon; Remains (from All Quiet on the Western Front) by Volker Bertelmann / Baiana by Barbatuques / Visit Me (from ZeroZeroZero) by Mogwai / Predator (from Voices at the End) by John Psathas / Addis Ababa (from Ciudades) by Guillermo Lago / Requiem (from Autómata) by Zacarías M. de la Riva / Can You Hear the Music (from Oppenheimer) by Ludwig Göransson	95.025	5th Place; World Class; Finalist

== Caption awards ==
At the annual World Championship Finals, Drum Corps International (DCI) presents named awards to the corps with the high average scores from prelims, semifinals, and finals in five captions. Santa Clara Vanguard has won these caption awards.

Don Angelica Best General Effect Award/Formerly Known: High General Effect

- 1972, 1973, 1974 (tie), 1975, 1978, 1987, 1989, 1999, 2018

John Brazale Best Visual Performance Award/Formerly Known: High Visual

- 1977, 1981, 1984 (tie), 1985, 1987 (tie), 2018

George Zingali Best Color Guard Award/Formerly Known: High Color Guard

- 1974, 1978 (tie), 1981, 2017

Jim Ott Best Brass Performance Award/Formerly Known: High Brass

- 1984 (3 way tie), 1987 (tie), 2018

Fred Sanford Best Percussion Performance Award/Formerly Known: High Percussion

- 1973, 1974, 1975, 1978, 1979, 1988, 1989, 1991 (3 way tie), 1998, 2004, 2014, 2016, 2017, 2018, 2019, 2024

== Vanguard Cadets Drum and Bugle Corps ==
Vanguard Cadets Drum Corps
- Location: Santa Clara, CA
- Division: Open Class
- Founded: 1971
- Director: Rafael Bretado
- Championship titles: DCI Open Class; 2000; 2008; 2013; 2015; 2017; 2018; 2022
- Website: https://www.scvanguard.org/vanguard-cadets/

The Santa Clara Vanguard Cadets Drum Corps, also known as the Vanguard Cadets, is an Open Class competitive junior drum corps. Based in Santa Clara, California, the corps is a member of Drum Corps International (DCI) and is the feeder corps for the Santa Clara Vanguard Drum and Bugle Corps.

The Santa Clara Vanguard Cadets were formed in 1971 as a cadet feeder and training corps for the Santa Clara Vanguard. They began as a parade corps, but by the end of the 1970s, the Vanguard Cadets had become a truly competitive Class A corps. The corps did its first major touring in 1990, and in 1991, they attended their first DCI World Championships in Dallas. In 1993, the corps became the first cadet corps to achieve DCI membership. In 2000, the Vanguard Cadets became the first feeder corps to win a championship in Division II (now Open Class). The corps also qualified for the Division I (now World Class) Semifinals. Despite their cadet status, the Vanguard Cadets won their division in 2000, 2008, 2013, 2015, 2017, 2018, and 2022.

In September 2018, Vanguard Music & Performing Arts, BD Performing Arts, and Drum Corps International announced that the Vanguard Cadets would "be restructured as a California-based drum corps" and that both the Vanguard Cadets and the Blue Devils B Drum and Bugle Corps would not attend DCI Open Class Championships in 2019.

In September 2022, Vanguard Music & Performing Arts announced that the Vanguard Cadets Drum & Bugle Corps will be placed on hiatus for the 2023 season due to multiple unforeseen financial issues that faced both Vanguard corps during the previous season. The Vanguard Cadets did not return to Drum Corps International for the 2024 season.

In July 2026, Vanguard Music & Performing Arts announced the return of the Vanguard Cadets for the 2027 season, consisting of a regional West Coast tour under the direction of Dr. Colby Vasquez, an assistant corps director for the Santa Clara Vanguard.

=== Show summary (1982–2024) ===
Key
Light blue background indicates DCI Open Class Finalist (Note: In 1991, the Vanguard Cadets competed as Class A, from 1992–2007 in Division II, and since 2008 in Open Class. These are the same tier, just renamed.)
Goldenrod background indicates DCI Open Class Champion
Pale green background indicates DCI World Class Semifinalist

Year	Repertoire	World Championships	
Year	Repertoire	Score	Placement
1982	Main Theme & Can You Read My Mind (from Superman) by John Williams / The Eagle and the Hawk by John Denver & Mike Taylor	Did not attend World Championships	
1983	Festive Overture by Dmitri Shostakovich / Main Theme (from Superman) by John Williams / Battle in the Mutara Nebula (from Star Trek II: The Wrath of Khan) by James Horner / When You Wish Upon a Star (from Pinocchio) by Ned Washington / If You Believe (from The Wiz) by Charlie Smalls	Did not attend World Championships	
1984	Festive Overture by Dmitri Shostakovich / Superman Medley by John Williams / Last Chance to Dance by T-Bone Burnett / Black Saddle by Michael Hennagin / If You Believe (from The Wiz) by Charlie Smalls	Did not attend World Championships	
1985	Conquest (from Captain from Castile) by Alfred Newman / Forgotten Dreams by Leroy Anderson / Once in a Lifetime (from Stop The World - I Want to Get Off) by Anthony Newley / Hungarian Dance No. 2 by Johannes Brahms / You'll Never Walk Alone (from Carousel) by Richard Rodgers & Oscar Hammerstein II	Did not attend World Championships	
1986	Land of Make Believe by Chuck Mangione / Baja by Ary Barroso / "You Can't Hurry Love" by Lamont Dozier, Brian Holland & Eddie Holland / Imagine by John Lennon / Black Saddle by Michael Hennagin / Tradition (from Fiddler on the Roof) by Jerry Bock & Sheldon Harnick	Did not attend World Championships	
1987	The Voyage Home (from Star Trek IV: The Voyage Home) by Leonard Rosenman / Echano (from Children of Sanchez) by Chuck Mangione / Clock by John Holt / Land of Make Believe by Chuck Mangione	Did not attend World Championships	
1988	Scenes From the Louvre by Norman Dello Joio / Wild Life Market Street by Yellowjackets / In the Stone by Allee Willis, David Foster & Maurice White / Theme from Dirty Dancing by John Morris / Henry V by Sir William Walton	Did not attend World Championships	
1989	Mutiny on the Bounty by David Cooke / Children's Crusade by Gordon Matthew Thomas Sumner / Hopak (Traditional) / On My Own (from Les Misérables) by Claude-Michel Schönberg, Alain Boublil, Jean-Marc Natel & Herbert Kretzmer	Did not attend World Championships	
1990	Russian Sailor's Dance (from The Red Poppy) by Reinhold Gliere / Who Will Buy (from Oliver!) by Lionel Bart / If You Believe (from The Wiz) by Charlie Smalls	Did not attend World Championships	
1991	Theme from The Big Country by Jerome Moross / In Quiet Dignity & Echoes of Ancient Battles by Checkfield / This is One of Those Moments (from Yentl) by Michel Legrand / Anything but Lonely (from Aspects of Love) by Andrew Lloyd Webber	88.200	4th Place; Class A & A60; Finalist
1991	Theme from The Big Country by Jerome Moross / In Quiet Dignity & Echoes of Ancient Battles by Checkfield / This is One of Those Moments (from Yentl) by Michel Legrand / Anything but Lonely (from Aspects of Love) by Andrew Lloyd Webber	62.200	27th Place; Open Class
1992	Selections from Robin Hood: Prince of Thieves; Overture, Maid Marion, Little John and the Band in the Forest & The Final Battle at the Gallows (all from Robin Hood: Prince of Thieves) by Michael Kamen / Danza Final (from Estancia) by Alberto Ginestera	Did not attend World Championships	
1993	Selections from Far and Away; Land Race, Oklahoma Territory, Blowing Off Steam, The Big Match & Race to the River; All from Far and Away by John Williams	92.600	2nd Place; Division II & III; Finalist
1993	Selections from Far and Away; Land Race, Oklahoma Territory, Blowing Off Steam, The Big Match & Race to the River; All from Far and Away by John Williams	69.300	25th Place; Division I
1994	The Music of Michael Kamen; Courante, Concerto for Saxophone, Estampie, Shining Through & Galliard; All from The Three Musketeers by Michael Kamen	Did not attend World Championships	
1995	The Red Pony by Aaron Copland / Fall River Legend by Morton Gould / Wyatt Earp by James Newton Howard	Did not attend World Championships	
1996	Piano Concerto No. 2, Mvt. 1 by Béla Bartók / Dance of the Comedians by Peter Ilyich Tchaikovsky / Ballet Suite No. 3 by Dmitri Shostakovich / Alexander Nevsky by Sergei Prokofiev	Did not attend World Championships	
1997	Selections from Evita; Latin Chant, Buenos Aires, I'd Be Surprisingly Good For You, And The Money Kept Rolling In, Don't Cry For Me Argentina, Santa Evita & A New Argentina; All from Evita by Andrew Lloyd Webber	Did not attend World Championships	
1998	Selections from the Broadway Musical Titanic; The Boarding: Godspeed Titanic, Barrett's Song, The Proposal & Ship of Dreams; All from Titanic by Maury Yeston	93.700	5th Place; Division II; Finalist
1999	Scenes From the Louvre by Ottorino Respighi / The Gathering of the Ranks at Hebron by David Holsinger / Merry Mount Suite by Howard Hanson	Did not attend World Championships	
2000	Journey From the Darkness; The Dream of Oenghus by Rolf Rudin / Song of Moses by David Holsinger / Message of the Man; The Cave, The Struggle and Man From The Light & Escape...Into The Light! (from Escape From Plato's Cave) by Stephen Melillo	94.350	1st Place; Division II & III; Champion
2000	Journey From the Darkness; The Dream of Oenghus by Rolf Rudin / Song of Moses by David Holsinger / Message of the Man; The Cave, The Struggle and Man From The Light & Escape...Into The Light! (from Escape From Plato's Cave) by Stephen Melillo	74.700	17th Place; Division I Semifinalist
2001	Tempered Steel by Charles Rochester Young / Partita by Philip Sparke / The Gift of Love & Time to Take Back the Knights by Stephen Melillo	Did not attend World Championships	
2002	Molto Ritmico & Lento (from Dance Movements) by Philip Sparke / Timestorm (from Stormworks) by Stephen Melillo / Easter Symphony by David Holsinger	94.350	4th Place; Division II & III; Finalist
2003	Overture to a New Era by Caesar Giovannini / Urban Dances by Richard Danielpour / American Beauty by Thomas Newman / Easter Symphony by David Holsinger	Did not attend World Championships	
2004	Engulfed Cathedral by Claude Debussy / The New Moon in the Old Man's Arms by Michael Kamen / New Beginnings & Celebration Overture by Peter Boyer	94.725	3rd Place; Division II & III; Finalist
2005	Through the Rainforest & The Anaconda (from Amazonian Rainforest) by Key Poulan / Message of The Man (from Escape From Plato's Cave) by Stephan Melillo / Sentenced to Death & The Descent into the Dark Unknown (from The Pit and the Pendulum) & Checkered Flag (from Need for Speed) by Key Poulan	Did not attend World Championships	
2006	Innovations; Mishima: Opening & Primacy of Number (from Naqoyqatsi) by Philip Glass / Water Dances: Gliding by Michael Nyman / The Grid (from Koyaanisqatsi) by Philip Glass	89.525	5th Place; Division II & III; Finalist
2007	Ascension: Music from The Divine Comedy; Purgatory, Inferno, Paradise & Ascension; All from The Divine Comedy by Robert W. Smith	90.400	5th Place; Division II & III; Finalist
2008	Perspectives; Perspectives by James Peterson & Robby Elfman	96.825	1st Place; Open Class; Champion
2009	Love; When I Fall in Love by Edward Heyman / Seasons of Love (from Rent) by Jonathon Larson & Freddie Mercury / Elephant Love Medley (from Moulin Rouge!) by Craig Armstrong & Baz Luhrmann / El Tango de Roxanne (from Moulin Rouge!) by Sting & Mariano Mores / Nessun Dorma (from Turandot) by Giacomo Puccini	94.700	2nd Place; Open Class; Finalist
2010	Chakra; Introduction, Root and Sacral Chakras, Solar and Heart Chakras, Throat Chakra & Head and Crown Chakras; All from Chakra by Key Poulan	Did not attend World Championships	
2011	Balance; Symmetry, Equilibrium, Harmony & Equality; All by Key Poulan, Nate Bourg & Murray Gusseck	94.200	3rd Place; Open Class; Finalist
2011	Balance; Symmetry, Equilibrium, Harmony & Equality; All by Key Poulan, Nate Bourg & Murray Gusseck	72.850	23rd Place; World Class; Semifinalist
2012	Heroes and Legends; Main Title (from Rome) by Jeff Beal / Danse Bacchanale (from Samson & Delilah) by Camille Saint-Saëns / Viva La Vida by Guy Berryman, Jonathan Buckland, William Champion & Chri Martin / Medea's Meditation and Dance of Vengeance (from Medea) by Samuel Barber / Wishing You Were Somehow Here Again (from The Phantom of the Opera) by Andrew Lloyd Webber / Russian Christmas Music by Alfred Reed / The Great Gate of Kiev (from Pictures at an Exhibition) by Modest Mussorgsky	93.800	3rd Place; Open Class; Finalist
2012	Heroes and Legends; Main Title (from Rome) by Jeff Beal / Danse Bacchanale (from Samson & Delilah) by Camille Saint-Saëns / Viva La Vida by Guy Berryman, Jonathan Buckland, William Champion & Chri Martin / Medea's Meditation and Dance of Vengeance (from Medea) by Samuel Barber / Wishing You Were Somehow Here Again (from The Phantom of the Opera) by Andrew Lloyd Webber / Russian Christmas Music by Alfred Reed / The Great Gate of Kiev (from Pictures at an Exhibition) by Modest Mussorgsky	72.750	22nd Place; World Class; Semifinalist
2013	The Art of War; Unto the Breach by Key Poulan / Night on Bald Mountain by Modest Mussorgsky / Elegy for Dunkirk (from Atonement) by Dario Marianelli / Hut of Baba-Yaga (from Pictures at an Exhibition) by Modest Mussorgsky / Adagio for Strings by Samuel Barber / The Promise of Living (from The Tender Land) by Aaron Copland	96.150	1st Place; Open Class; Champion
2013	The Art of War; Unto the Breach by Key Poulan / Night on Bald Mountain by Modest Mussorgsky / Elegy for Dunkirk (from Atonement) by Dario Marianelli / Hut of Baba-Yaga (from Pictures at an Exhibition) by Modest Mussorgsky / Adagio for Strings by Samuel Barber / The Promise of Living (from The Tender Land) by Aaron Copland	77.700	21st Place; World Class; Semifinalist
2014	The Road Not Taken; Kaval Sviri (Bulgarian Traditional) / Meetings Along the Edge by Philip Glass & Ravi Shankar / Forbidden Friendship & Test Drive (from How to Train Your Dragon) by John Powell / Symphony No. 5 by Ludwig van Beethoven / Secrets by Ryan Tedder (OneRepublic)	81.650	2nd Place; Open Class; Finalist
2014	The Road Not Taken; Kaval Sviri (Bulgarian Traditional) / Meetings Along the Edge by Philip Glass & Ravi Shankar / Forbidden Friendship & Test Drive (from How to Train Your Dragon) by John Powell / Symphony No. 5 by Ludwig van Beethoven / Secrets by Ryan Tedder (OneRepublic)	80.200	18th Place; World Class; Semifinalist
2015	On Cloud Nine; Life (from Prometheus) by Harry Gregson-Williams / Awakening (from On Cloud Nine) by Key Poulan, Fred Emory Smith & Casey Brohard / Girl with the Plums (from Perfume: The Story of a Murderer) by Tom Tykwer, Johnny Klimek & Reinhold Heil / Big Hero Six by Henry Jackman	81.225	1st Place; Open Class; Champion
2015	On Cloud Nine; Life (from Prometheus) by Harry Gregson-Williams / Awakening (from On Cloud Nine) by Key Poulan, Fred Emory Smith & Casey Brohard / Girl with the Plums (from Perfume: The Story of a Murderer) by Tom Tykwer, Johnny Klimek & Reinhold Heil / Big Hero Six by Henry Jackman	79.350	16th Place; World Class; Semifinalist
2016	The One; Pines of the Appian Way by Ottorino Respighi / Due Tremonti by Ludovico Einaudi / Iza Ngosmo (Come Tomorrow) by Christopher Tin	78.850	2nd Place; Open Class; Finalist
2016	The One; Pines of the Appian Way by Ottorino Respighi / Due Tremonti by Ludovico Einaudi / Iza Ngosmo (Come Tomorrow) by Christopher Tin	78.000	20th Place; World Class; Semifinalist
2017	In Pieces; Feedback by Francisco Gabas, Francisco Lomeňa, Javier Martin, Marina Abad, Maxwell Wright, Nitin Sawhney, Ramón Giménez, Sergio Ramos & Xavier Turull (Ojos de Brujo) / Temen Oblak by Christopher Tin / Kaleidoscope by Fred Emory Smith / Harvest by John Mackey	80.725	1st Place; Open Class; Champion
2017	In Pieces; Feedback by Francisco Gabas, Francisco Lomeňa, Javier Martin, Marina Abad, Maxwell Wright, Nitin Sawhney, Ramón Giménez, Sergio Ramos & Xavier Turull (Ojos de Brujo) / Temen Oblak by Christopher Tin / Kaleidoscope by Fred Emory Smith / Harvest by John Mackey	81.975	16th Place; World Class; Semifinalist
2018	Off The Wall; Bicycle Race by Freddie Mercury / Sounding Board by Fred Emory Smith & Ryan Adamsons / Fly to Paradise by Eric Whitacre / Rebound by Fred Emory Smith & Ryan Adamsons	80.075	1st Place; Open Class; Champion
2018	Off The Wall; Bicycle Race by Freddie Mercury / Sounding Board by Fred Emory Smith & Ryan Adamsons / Fly to Paradise by Eric Whitacre / Rebound by Fred Emory Smith & Ryan Adamsons	81.025	18th Place; World Class; Semifinalist
2019	What About Us; What About Us by Alecia Moore (Pink), Steve Mac & Johnny McDaid / Primacy of Number (from Naqoyqatsi) by Philip Glass / Downside Up by Peter Gabriel / Three Ring by Fred Emory Smith & Ryan Adamsons / Alone by Christopher Comstock (Marshmello)	Did not attend World Championships	
2020	Season cancelled due to the COVID-19 pandemic		
2021	Opted out of competition for the season		
2022	Somewhere New; Call to Adventure by Fred Smith & Ryan Adamsons / Overture from The Magic Flute by Mozart / Absurd Waltz (from Le Petit Prince) by Richard Harvey & Hans Zimmer / Johanna from Sweeney Todd by Stephen Sondheim / The Escape (from Le Petit Prince) by Richard Harvey & Hans Zimmer	83.550	1st Place; Open Class; Champion
2022	Somewhere New; Call to Adventure by Fred Smith & Ryan Adamsons / Overture from The Magic Flute by Mozart / Absurd Waltz (from Le Petit Prince) by Richard Harvey & Hans Zimmer / Johanna from Sweeney Todd by Stephen Sondheim / The Escape (from Le Petit Prince) by Richard Harvey & Hans Zimmer	81.050	18th Place; World Class; Semifinalist
2023–26	Corps inactive due to budgetary constraints		
