= Seattle Cascades Drum and Bugle Corps =

Junior drum and bugle corps based in Seattle, Washington

Coordinates: 47.7286°N 122.3481°W

- Location: Seattle, WA
- Division: World Class
- Founded: 1966
- Corps Director: Devin Bretz
- Championship titles: DCI Open Class: 2000
- Website: www.seattlecascades.org

The Seattle Cascades Drum and Bugle Corps is a World Class competitive drum and bugle corps. Based in Seattle, Washington, the Cascades is a member corps of Drum Corps International.

== History ==
Cascades 50th Anniversary logo, 2016

The all-male Greenwood Boys Club Drum and Bugle Corps was founded in 1957 by Jack Avery in Seattle’s Green Lake area. In 1958, Roderick Stubbs became the director of the corps and changed the name to the Seattle Thunderbirds. With no other drum corps in their region, the corps existed as a parade and stand-still exhibition unit. The corps raised money to support its operations by holding bingo games at the Green Lake VFW, which became one of the corps’ sponsors. After witnessing the 1963 VFW Junior National Championship in Seattle, the Thunderbirds' leadership decided to put the corps on the competition field.

1964 was a groundbreaking year for the Seattle Thunderbirds. Under the leadership of George Laumin and Jack Little, the corps entered the field with a program of show tunes and modern field drill. They traveled to Cleveland for VFW Nationals, where the corps placed 32nd among 45 corps. Additionally, the corps started a feeder corps and named it the Thunderbird Cadets, under the direction of Rod Stubbs and Jack Avery, with the major performance during its inaugural season being the Rose Festival Parade in Portland, Oregon.

In 1966, Rod Stubbs left the Thunderbird organization, and with some of its marching members, started a new corps, named the Cascade Cadets. In 1970, many staff and marching members of the Seattle Thunderbirds defected to the Cascade Cadets, which then changed its name to the Seattle Cascades, After the 1972 season, the remnants of the Thunderbirds organization were absorbed into the Seattle Cascades. In 1977, for the first time, the Cascades traveled to DCI Finals in Denver, also attending American Legion Nationals in the Denver suburbs. Although they had some competitive success in its early days, some years the organization struggled to put a corps on the field.

In 1985, the corps reorganized as a Class A60 (later Division III) corps. They then returned to marching parades until 1991, when they returned to the competition field in Class A60. In 1992, the corps moved into Division II (DII), moving up to a 6th-place finish in the division in 1996 before taking another year off to reorganize. The corps returned as a DII corps, earning a 9th-place finish in 1998 and 6th in 1999. In 2000, the corps stepped down to DIII and were crowned DCI Division III World Champions. In 2001, the corps membership nearly doubled, and the corps finished a close 2nd to Mandarins in Division II, advanced to the Division I preliminary competition, and gained a 17th-place ranking in DCI.

In 2002, the Seattle Cascades moved into Division I (now World Class) competition and became the first corps from the Pacific Northwest to earn a place in Finals.

== Show summary (1972–2026) ==
Key
Light blue background indicates DCI Open Class Finalist (Note: From 1992–2001, the Seattle Cascades competed in Division II or Division III; both tiers have since been renamed Open Class.)
Goldenrod background indicates DCI Open Class Champion
Pale green background indicates DCI World Class Semifinalist (Note: From 2002–2007, the Seattle Cascades competed in Division I, and have competed since 2008 in World Class. These are the same tier, just renamed.)
Pale blue background indicates DCI World Class Finalist

Year	Repertoire	World Championships	
Year	Repertoire	Score	Placement
1972	She'll Be Coming 'Round the Mountain (Traditional) / Shenandoah (Traditional) / Sweet Betsy from Pike by John A. Stone / Rodeo by Aaron Copland / Wild, Wild West by Richard Markowitz / Rawhide by Dimitri Tiomkin & Ned Washington / Bonanza by David Rose / Promised Land (from How the West Was Won) by Alfred Newman / Seattle (from Here Come the Brides) by Hugo Montenegro, Jack Keller & Ernie Sheldon	Did not attend World Championships	
1973	Entry to the Coliseum by Michael Leckrone / Greensleeves (Traditional) / America, the Beautiful by Samuel A. Ward & Katharine Lee Bates / African Suite by Samuel Coleridge-Taylor / Sabbath Prayer (from Fiddler on the Roof) by Jerry Bock & Sheldon Harnick	Did not attend World Championships	
1974	Soul Sacrifice by David Brown, Marcus Malone, Gregg Rolie & Carlos Santana (Santana) / African Suite by Samuel Coleridge-Taylor / Sabbath Prayer (from Fiddler on the Roof) by Jerry Bock & Sheldon Harnick / El Gato Triste by Chuck Mangione / Requiem for an Era by Truman Crawford	Did not attend World Championships	
1975	Russian Sailor's Dance (from The Red Poppy) by Reinhold Glière / Gospel John by Jill Steinberg / Requiem for an Era by Truman Crawford	Did not attend World Championships	
1976	The Sinfonians by Clifton Williams / Karn Evil 9 – Second Impression by Keith Emerson, Greg Lake & Peter Sinfield / Rain on My Parade (from Funny Girl) by Bob Merrill & Jule Styne / El Gato Triste by Chuck Mangione	Did not attend World Championships	
1977	Nutville by Horace Ward Martin Tavares Silva (Horace Silver) / El Gato Triste by Chuck Mangione / Selections from The Wizard of Oz by Harold Arlen & E.Y. "Yip" Harburg / Home (from The Wiz) by Charlie Smalls	52.300	45th Place; Open Class
1978	The Flintstones Theme by Hoyt Curtin / Send in the Clowns (from A Little Night Music) by Stephen Sondheim / Medley from The Wiz by Charlie Smalls	64.450	34th Place; Open Class
1979	Brand New Day (from The Wiz) by Charlie Smalls / Send in the Clowns (from A Little Night Music) by Stephen Sondheim / If You Believe, Mean Old Lion & Home (from The Wiz) by Charlie Smalls	Did not attend World Championships	
1980–81	Parade corps	Did not attend World Championships	
1982	Explosions / Macarena / Late in the Evening by Paul Simon / Spies in the Night by David Foster & Jay Graydon	Did not attend World Championships	
1983	Explosions / El Gato Triste by Chuck Mangione / Whistling Midgets by Tom Collier & Dan Dean / Stoney End by Laura Nyro / Just Once by Barry Mann & Cynthia Weil	Did not attend World Championships	
1984	When You Wish Upon a Star (from Pinocchio) by Leigh Harline & Ned Washington / Someday My Prince Will Come (from Snow White and the Seven Dwarfs) by Frank Churchill & Larry Morey / Zip-a-Dee-Doo-Dah (from Song of the South) by Allie Wrubel & Ray Gilbert / Alice in Wonderland & Very Good Advice (from Alice in Wonderland) by Sammy Fain & Bob Hilliard	Did not attend World Championships	
1985	Repertoire unavailable	37.000	15th Place; Class A60
1986–88	Corps inactive		
1989–90	Parade corps		
1991	Gershwin; Selections by George Gershwin	60.000	12th Place; Class A60
1992	Kismet; The Sands of Time, Gesticulate, Zubbediyah & Strangers in Paradise; All from Kismet by Robert Wright & George Forrest, adapted from the works of Alexander Borodin	54.200	17th Place; Division II
1993	A Riverboat/Showboat; Ol' Man River (from Show Boat) by Jerome Kern & Oscar Hammerstein II / Waiting for the Robert E. Lee by Lewis F. Muir & L. Wolfe Gilbert / Proud Mary by John Fogerty	70.000	14th Place; Division II
1994	A Day in Paris; La Vie en Rose by Louiguy, Marguerite Monnot & Édith Piaf / Claire de Lune by Claude Debussy / Scherzo by John Cheetham	71.800	17th Place; Division II
1995	Salute to Elton John; Goodbye Yellow Brick Road & Saturday Night's Alright For Fighting by Elton John & Bernie Taupin / Funeral For a Friend by Elton John / Candle in the Wind by Elton John & Bernie Taupin	79.700	10th Place; Division II
1996	Salute to the Beatles; Lucy in the Sky With Diamonds, Magical Mystery Tour & "Eleanor Rigby" by Lennon–McCartney / Imagine by John Lennon	86.600	6th Place; Division II
1997	Corps inactive		
1998	The Music of Chicago; Does Anybody Really Know What Time It Is? & Listen by Robert Lamm / Someday by James Pankow & Robert Lamm / Beginnings by Robert Lamm	83.800	9th Place; Division II
1999	Technological Evolution: A Fable in Four Acts; The Innocents, The March of Civilization, The Mechanized Society & The Awakening; All by Pat Metheney & Lyle Mays	88.800	6th Place; Division II
2000	At the Strongholds of En Gedi; At the Strongholds of En Gedi, Prelude and Rondo & Liturgical Dances by David Holsinger / Endurance by Timothy Mahr / Gymnway's Revenge by David Holsinger	89.700	1st Place; Division II & III; Champion
2000	At the Strongholds of En Gedi; At the Strongholds of En Gedi, Prelude and Rondo & Liturgical Dances by David Holsinger / Endurance by Timothy Mahr / Gymnway's Revenge by David Holsinger	67.500	23rd Place; Division I
2001	The Veneration; Abram's Pursuit, Helm Toccata & The Armies of the Omnipresent Otserf; All by David Holsinger	96.700	2nd Place; Division II & III; Finalist
2001	The Veneration; Abram's Pursuit, Helm Toccata & The Armies of the Omnipresent Otserf; All by David Holsinger	78.300	17th Place; Division I Semifinalist
2002	City Riffs: The Music of Leonard Bernstein; On the Town, Profanation (from The Jeremiah Symphony), Simple Song (from Mass), Riffs (from Prelude, Fugue, and Riffs) & Make Our Garden Grow (from Candide); All by Leonard Bernstein	84.050	12th Place; Division I Finalist
2003	Festiva Danza; Huapango by José Pablo Moncayo / Harp Concerto by Alberto Ginastera / Oblivion & Libertango by Astor Piazzolla / El Salon Mexico by Aaron Copland	81.650	15th Place; Division I Semifinalist
2004	Nature's Confession; Distant Showers by Scott Boerma & Rob Lewis / Savannah River Holiday by Ron Nelson / The Birth by Benoît Jutras / Allegro Impetuoso by Václav Nelhýbel / All Things Bright and Beautiful by John Rutter	81.800	15th Place; Division I Semifinalist
2005	Airborne Symphony; Airborne Symphony by Marc Blitzstein / Aerodynamics by David Gillingham / Weeping Willow by Scott Joplin / Redline Tango by John Mackey / Stairway To Heaven by Jimmy Page & Robert Plant	78.100	17th Place; Division I Semifinalist (Note: In 2005, the Seattle Cascades and the Mandarins tied for 17th place.)
2006	Redemption; Ghosts by Stephen McNeff / Second String Quartet by Béla Bartók / Dance Movement No. 1 by Russ Newbury / Lux Arumque by Eric Whitacre / Ra! by David Dzubay	75.525	19th Place; Division I
2007	Three; Postcards by Frank Ticheli / Sleep by Eric Whitacre / V2 Schneider by Philip Glass	80.100	18th Place; Division I
2008	Corps inactive		
2009	Beyond the Forest; Into The Forest / Selections from Pan's Labyrinth by Javier Navarrete / Tangiers (from The Bourne Ultimatum) by John Powell / Not While I'm Around (from Sweeney Todd) by Stephen Sondheim / Make Our Garden Grow (from Candide) by Leonard Bernstein	74.950	22nd Place; World Class
2010	Silver Lining; Cloudsplitter Fanfare by Jack Stamp / Allegro Impetuoso (from Two Symphonic Movements) by Václav Nelhýbel / River Flows in You by Yiruma / Hope Awakes by Josh Hinkle / The Sun Will Come Out Tomorrow by Charles Strouse & Martin Charnin	74.600	22nd Place; World Class
2011	Pandora, a Dark Gift; Pandora - A Dark Gift by Josh Hinkle & Chris Grant / My Immortal by Ben Moody & Amy Lee	72.200	24th Place; World Class; Semifinalist
2012	Shinto; Kingfishers Catch Fire by John Mackey / Panda Po (from Kung Fu Panda) by Hans Zimmer / Shogun by John Powell	68.750	25th Place; World Class; Semifinalist
2013	Inescapable; Solar Sailor (from Tron: Legacy) by Guy-Manuel de Homem-Christo & Thomas Bangalter (Daft Punk) / Original Music by Lewis Norfleet	69.850	27th Place; World Class
2014	Turn; Summertime (from Porgy and Bess) by George Gershwin / Firebird by Igor Stravinsky / Turn! Turn! Turn! by Pete Seeger / Carol of the Bells by Mykola Leontovych & Peter J. Wilhousky / Dies Irae (from Requiem) by Giuseppe Verdi / The Rite of Spring by Igor Stravinsky / Simple Gifts by Joseph Brackett	72.250	26th Place; World Class
2015	Intergalactic; Mars (from The Planets) by Gustav Holst / Enterprising Young Men (from Star Trek) by Michael Giacchino / Short Ride in a Fast Machine by John Adams / Black Hole Sun by Chris Cornell / Venus, Mercury & Jupiter (from The Planets) by Gustav Holst / Intergalactic by Michael Diamond, Adam Yauch & Adam Horovitz (Beastie Boys) and Mario Caldato Jr. / To Boldly Go (from Star Trek) by Michael Giacchino / Theme from Star Trek by Alexander Courage	71.075	24th Place; World Class; Semifinalist
2016	O Apollo Unleashed from Symphony No. 2 by Frank Ticheli / The Moment I Said It by Imogen Heap / Orawa by Wojciech Kilar	75.150	22nd Place; World Class; Semifinalist
2017	Set Free; 1000 Airplanes on the Roof, Labyrinth & Scenes of Memory by Philip Glass / Symphony No. 10, Mvt. 2 by Dmitri Shostakovich / Bird Set Free by Sia / Free Bird by Allen Collins & Ronnie Van Zant (Lynyrd Skynyrd) / Fly to Paradise by Eric Whitacre / Caged Bird (Poem) by Maya Angelou	74.125	26th Place; World Class
2018	What Goes Around; Wound Up, Spin Moves, Infinite Echoes & Unraveled by Key Poulan, Micah Brusse, Alex Brinkley & Kaela Shoe / Ave Maria by Franz Schubert / What Goes Around... Comes Around by Justin Timberlake, Tim Mosley & Nathaniel Hills / Around the World by Guy-Manuel de Homem-Christo & Thomas Bangalter (Daft Punk)	71.963	27th Place; World Class
2019	Off the Grid; Off the Grid by Brandon Smith / Asphalt Cocktail by John Mackey / I've Got the World on a String by Harold Arlen & Ted Koehler / Never Gonna Give You Up by Matt Aitken, Mike Stock & Pete Waterman / Nitro by Frank Ticheli / High Wire by John Mackey	73.275	25th Place; World Class; Semifinalist
2020	Season cancelled due to the COVID-19 pandemic		
2021	Opted out of competition for the season		
2022	Corps inactive		
2023	Revival; Bad Moon Rising by Mourning Ritual / Stained Glass by David Gillingham / Angels in the Architecture by Frank Ticheli / I Will Follow You Into the Dark by Death Cab for Cutie / Revival (Interlude) by Eminem	73.925	25th Place; World Class; Semifinalist
2024	Sky Above; Across The Universe by The Beatles / Out of The Blue by Nigel Westlake / Kaval Sviri (The Flute Plays) by Bulgarian State Television Female Vocal Choir / Sky Above by Jacob Collier / Imagine by John Lennon	76.075	23rd Place; World Class; Semifinalist
2025	Primary; Yellow by Coldplay / Butterfly by BTS / Love You like a Love Song by Selena Gomez / A Million Miles Away (from Belle) by Mamoru Hosoda, Kaho Nakamura & Taisei Iwasaki / Original music by Jeff Chambers & Eric Yahrmarkt / Usseewa by Ado / Shikabane no Odori by Kikuo / My Universe by Coldplay & BTS	77.075	23rd Place; World Class; Semifinalist
2026	Against the Grain; Heart Shaped Box by Nirvana / Man in the Box by Alice in Chains / Rite of Spring by Igor Stravinsky / Smells Like Teen Spirit by Nirvana	78.563	21st Place; World Class; Semifinalist
