= Richard Aaker Trythall =

American Italian composer (1939–2022)

- Born: 25 July 1939; Knoxville, Tennessee, U.S.
- Died: December 21, 2022 (aged 83); Rome, Italy
- Education: University of Tennessee; Princeton University; Berlin University of the Arts
- Occupations: Composer, pianist, educator
- Spouse: Marisa Patulli
- Children: 1
- Musical career
- Genres: Classical, Ragtime
- Instrument: Piano
- Labels: Composers Recordings, Inc. Thorofon Records; Centaur Records; New World Records
- Website: richardtrythall.com

Richard Aaker Trythall (July 25, 1939 – December 21, 2022) was an American-born Italian composer and pianist of contemporary classical music.

== Early life and education ==
Trythall was born on July 25, 1939, in Knoxville, Tennessee, the younger brother of composer Gil Trythall. His family, related to composer Edvard Grieg, has Welsh and Norwegian ancestry, and moved to the United States from Norway.

He attended Central High School in Knoxville and in 1958 he enrolled at the University of Tennessee, where he studied under David Van Vactor graduating with a Bachelor of Music in 1961. His interest in composition was fostered by Van Vactor, at the time conductor of the Knoxville Symphony Orchestra and founder of the University of Tennessee School of Music. He was then admitted to Princeton University in 1961 where he studied under Earl Kim, Roger Sessions, Milton Babbitt, and Edward T. Cone obtaining a Master of Fine Arts in 1963. He completed his music studies attending, that same year, advanced composition courses at the Berlin University of the Arts where he studied with Boris Blacher under a Fulbright-Hays Scholarship.

Trythall was part of the group of David Van Vactor's notable students named the Van Vactor Five together with Gil Trythall, David P. Sartor, Jesse Ayers, and Doug Davis.

== Career ==
Trythall was invited by Lukas Foss and Lejaren Hiller to join the faculty of the Center of the Creative and Performing Arts of the State University of New York at Buffalo where he taught from 1972 to 1973. He was also on the faculty of the University of California, Davis in 1976.

He has been a member of the Gruppo di Improvvisazione Nuova Consonanza from his creation in 1964 until his dissolution in 1980. He has also given seminars on electronic and American music for the United States Information Agency. In 1993 he was a guest lecturer on the music of Charles Ives at the Sapienza University of Rome.

Trythall was a fellow (FAAR) of the American Academy in Rome since 1967, was made a resident (RAAR) in 1971, and served at the Academy as an advisor in musical composition. He was awarded the Rome Prize in musical composition twice, in 1964 and 1971. He also won the first prize in the Kranichsteiner Competition for Interpreters of Contemporary Piano Music at Darmstadt, in 1969, performing Karlheinz Stockhausen's Klavierstücke IX, Olivier Messiaen's Ile de feu I from Quatre études de rythme, and Pierre Boulez's Sonata No. 1. In 1973 he won the Walter W. Naumburg Foundation Recording Award with his work Coincidences (1969) together with Mario Davidovsky and Tison Street.

During his three-year fellowship at the Academy, he composed three orchestral works: Composition for Piano and Orchestra (1965), Penelope's Monologue for soprano and orchestra (1966) and Costruzione (1967). Trythall's was the last three-year fellowship awarded in music composition.

Trythall was selected twice, in 1960 and 1968, to take part to the Tanglewood Music Festival, where he performed his works Twelve Duets for Treble Instruments and Continuums.

Continuums (1968) was commissioned by the Fromm Music Foundation at Harvard University. The premiere took place at the Tanglewood Music Center in Lenox, Massachusetts, and was conducted by Gunther Schuller. Variations on a Theme by Haydn (1976) was commissioned by the Dorian Wind Quintet and premiered in Rome that same year. Parts Unknown, an hour-long composition for piano articulated in twelve sections, was composed between 1989 and 1991 and premiered in Rome, at the Ghione Theater, on December 9, 1991.

Trythall was the Italian correspondent for the American magazine Keyboard and wrote several articles on American music for various Italian publications. In 1995 he organized and directed the American Country Music Festival at the Palazzo delle Esposizioni in Rome. He is also on the faculty of the New York University Florence program, where he teaches music theory.

He is chair of the Department of Arts and director of the school choir at St. Stephen's International School in Rome, Italy where he started teaching music in 1966.

Trythall was a member of the jury of the 1988 and 2011 editions of the Viotti International Music Competition and president of the jury of the 2003 International Ettore Pozzoli Piano Competition. His compositions have been performed all over in the world, including at Carnegie Hall, the Cooper Union, the Auditorium Parco della Musica, the Aspen Music Festival and School, the Brooklyn Academy of Music, the Gaudeamus Festival, and the Venice Biennale.

Trythall also maintained strong collaborations with many composers along his career, including Lei Liang and Curt Cacioppo.

== Personal life ==
Trythall lived in Italy since 1964 until his death. In addition to his American citizenship, he acquired Italian citizenship in 1996. He lived in Rome with his wife, Marisa, an historian specialized in Holy See–United States relations. They have a daughter. Trythall died on December 21, 2022, at the age of 83.

== Awards ==
United States Department of State, Fulbright-Hays Scholarship – 1963
American Academy in Rome, Rome Prize in Musical Composition – 1964
John Simon Guggenheim Memorial Foundation, Guggenheim Fellowship for Music Composition – 1967
Kranichsteiner Competition for Interpreters of Contemporary Piano Music, First Prize – 1969
American Academy in Rome, Rome Prize in Musical Composition – 1971
Walter W. Naumburg Foundation, Recording Award – 1973

== Compositions ==
- 1958 – Twelve Duets for Treble Instruments
- 1959 – Theme and Variations for Piano and Orchestra
- 1960 – String Quartet
- 1961 – Symphonic Movement, for orchestra
- 1962 – Four Songs, for soprano and piano
- 1962 – Three Pieces, for piano
- 1963 – Piece for Small Orchestra
- 1963 – Trio for Violin, Cello, and Piano
- 1965 – Composition for Piano and Orchestra
- 1966 – Penelope's Monologue, for soprano and orchestra
- 1966 – Study, for synket and tape recorder
- 1967 – Costruzione, for orchestra
- 1968 – Continuums, for orchestra
- 1969 – Coincidences, for piano
- 1970–71 – Verse, multimedia event for slides, film, and tape
- 1973 - Suite for Harpsichord and Two Channel Tape on Music by Domenico Scarlatti
- 1974 – A Christmas Cantata, for chorus and instruments
- 1975 – Omaggio a Jerry Lee Lewis, for tape
- 1975 – Three Fantasias of an Old Shoemaker, for baritone and chorus
- 1975 – Mountain Songs, for chorus and guitars
- 1976 – Variations on a Theme by Haydn, for woodwind quintet and tape
- 1976 – Salute to the Fifties, for percussionist and tape
- 1978 – Dance Music, for tape
- 1979 – Bolero, for four percussionists
- 1979–81 – Recital One, twelve compositions for piano
- 1982–83 – Ballad, for piano and orchestra
- 1983 – Arabesque 2, for piano
- 1984 – Capriccio, ballet for three percussionists, tape, and dancers
- 1985–89 – Mirage, nine compositions for piano
- 1989 – Aria, for flute and piano
- 1989–91 – Parts Unknown, twelve compositions for piano
- 1996 – Two Haitian Ritual Dances, for prepared piano
- 1997 – Five Pieces in African-American Styles, for piano
- 2000 – Marisa, suite for piano
- 2001 – Out of Bounds, eleven remixes from Mirage and Solo Piano, for piano
- 2002 – Memories are Made of This, for string quintet, flute, clarinet, and piano four hands
- 2004 – Sweet, Sweet Memories, percussion quartet for xylophone, vibraphone, and marimba
- 1973–2007 – Dialogo tra ragione e follia, suite for harpsichord and pre-recorded sounds
- 2007 – The Education of Ebenezer Scrooge, for chorus, soloists, and readers
- 2009 – Sir Roger de Coverley, jig for two pianos, eight hands
- 2013 – Little Abat-jour, revue operetta

== Discography ==
- Inflexions, Chacona, Coincidences, String Quartet 1972, Composers Recordings, Inc., (1973)
- Players and Tape, American Contemporary, (1977)
- Solo Piano, Aspen Records, (1986)
- CMCD, Six Classic Concrete, Electroacoustic and Electronic Works 1970–1990, RēR Megacorp, (1991)
- X-Pression, Percussion Art Quartett, Thorofon Records, (1996)
- Charles Ives: Sonata No. 2 Concord, Mass., Centaur Records, (1996)
- Remember, Minstrel Records, (1997)
- Music from St. Stephen's School in Rome, St. Stephen's International School, (2001)
- Jelly Roll Morton Piano Music, CD Baby, (2002)
- Parts Unknown, Atopos, (2004)
- CMCD, Six Classic Concrete, Electroacoustic and Electronic Works 1970–1990, RēR Megacorp, (2004)
- Out of Bounds, CD Baby, (2005)
- The Education of Ebenezer Scrooge, CD Baby, (2008)
- Davidovsky, Street, Trythall, New World Records, (2010)
- Trythall, Hudson, McClellan, New World Records, (2011)
- Ragged Times, Historical, Opensound Music, (2013)
