= Gil Trythall =

- Born: Harry Gilbert Trythall; October 28, 1930; Knoxville, Tennessee, U.S.
- Died: February 17, 2023 (aged 92); Dallas, Texas, U.S.
- Education: University of Tennessee; Northwestern University; Cornell University
- Occupations: Composer, pianist, educator
- Spouses: Jean Marie Slater (m. 1951; div. 1976) Carol King (m. 1985)
- Children: 2
- Musical career
- Genres: Classical, Electronic
- Instrument: Piano
- Label: Grosset & Dunlap
- Website: musicstudy.com

Harry Gilbert Trythall (October 28, 1930 – February 17, 2023) was an American composer, electronic music pioneer, keyboardist, pianist of jazz and contemporary classical music, a lifelong educator, and a multimedia enthusiast. He often collaborated with artists (notably Prof. Don Evans (Vanderbilt-Nashville) to create engrossing public experiences. Dr. Trythall founded the Electronic Music Plus Festival in the late 1960s and hosted events at universities across the United States. As a musician, Trythall is best known for his experiments and compositions in electronic music. For instance, "Planet" by Four Tet and "myriad.industries" by Oneohtrix Point Never sample his 1980 compositions "Echospace" and "Luxicon II".

As a twentieth century composer of both traditional and electronic works, Gilbert Trythall combined the large scale sonorities reminiscent of Paul Hindemith and Wallingford Riegger with the expanded capabilities of both electronic and conventional instruments. His Symphony No. 1 (1958) is a demanding work for large orchestra, and his Hecuba and Polyxena of the same period is a severe, brilliant twelve-tone work. Beginning with the Moog synthesizer in the early 1960s, Trythall made increasing use of electronic and computerized resources and in the 1990s taught composition to students worldwide via his own Internet site from West Virginia University. Following his retirement in 1999, Trythall embarked upon a two-year program to develop courses in music and composition in Brazil.

Trythall's works are archived in the University of Tennessee's Music College.

== Early life and education ==
Harry Gilbert Trythall Jr. was born on October 28, 1930, in Knoxville, Tennessee, the older brother of composer and pianist Richard Aaker Trythall. He attended Central High School in Knoxville and, in 1948, he enrolled at the University of Tennessee where he studied under David Van Vactor graduating with a Bachelor of Arts in 1951. He was then admitted, that same year, to Northwestern University where he studied under Wallingford Riegger obtaining a Master of Music in 1952.

Trythall served in the United States Air Force from 1953 to 1957 (playing jazz piano to entertain troops). He then completed his music studies attending advanced composition courses in 1959-60 Cornell University where he studied under Robert Moffat Palmer obtaining a Doctor of Musical Arts degree.

Trythall was part of the group of David Van Vactor's notable students named the Van Vactor Five together with Richard Aaker Trythall, David P. Sartor, Jesse Ayers, and Doug Davis.

== Career ==
Trythall started his academic career as a graduate assistant during his studies at Cornell University after which he served as an assistant professor at Knox College in Galesburg, Illinois, from 1960 to 1964 where he was director of the Knox-Galesburg Symphony Orchestra. He was then appointed professor of music theory and composition at Peabody College in Nashville, Tennessee, where he taught from 1964 to 1975. During his academic tenure he also served as chairman of the Department of Music from 1973 to 1975. He was then appointed dean of the Creative Arts Center at West Virginia University in Morgantown, West Virginia, from 1975 to 1981.

Following his retirement in 1996, he was a visiting professor of music at the Federal University of Espírito Santo in Vitória, Brazil from 1999 to 2001, where he taught courses in music.

== Personal life and death ==
Trythall married Jean Marie Slater on December 28, 1951, but the couple divorced in 1976. He then married Carol King on September 19, 1985. Trythall had two daughters from his first marriage, Linda Marie and Karen Elizabeth.

Gil Trythall died in Dallas, Texas on February 17, 2023, at the age of 92.

== Compositions ==
- 1960 – Symphony no. 1
- 1958 – A Solemn Chant, for strings
- 1960 – The Music Lesson
- 1961 – Fanfare and Celebration
- 1961 – A String Quartet
- 1962 – Surfaces, for wind ensemble, tape, and lights
- 1963 – A Harp Concerto
- 1964 – Dionysia, for chamber orchestra
- 1964 – A Flute Sonata
- 1966 – A Vacuum Soprano, for brass quintet and tape
- 1967 – Entropy, for stereo brass, improvisation group, and stereo tape
- 1968 – In the Presence, for chorus and tape
- 1969 – The Electronic Womb, for tape
- 1971 – Echospace, for brass, tape, and film
- 1971 – A Time to Every Purpose, for chorus and tape
- 1975 – Cyndy the Synth (Minnie the Moog), for synthesizer and string orchestra
- 1981 – Luxikon II, for tape
- 1982 – The Terminal Opera
- 1988 – Mass in English and Spanish, for congregation, organ, and descant
- 1989 – Sinfonia Concertante
- 1990 – From the Egyptian Book of the Dead, for soprano, saxophone or wind controller, and synthesizer
- 1993 – The Pastimes of Lord Chaitanya, for jazz soprano and synthesizer
- 1994 – Intermission, for soprano and synthesizer

== Discography ==
- Symphony No. 1 , Knoxville Symphony Orchestra, David Van Vactor, Composers Recordings, Inc. (1961)
- Yakety Moog / Foggy Mountain Breakdown , Athena Records, (1970)
- Switched On Nashville (Country Moog), Athena Records, (1972)
- Nashville Gold (Switched On Moog), Summit Records Australia, (1973)
- Principles and Practice of Electronic Music, Grosset & Dunlap, (1973)
- Luxikon II / Echospace, Pandora Music, (1980)
- Country Moog + Nashville Gold, Vroom Sound Records, (2003)
- Country Moog (Switched On Nashville) / Nashville Gold (Switched On Moog), The Omni Recording Corporation, (2007)

== Publications ==
- Principles and Practice of Electronic Music, Grosset & Dunlap, 1973
- Eighteenth Century Counterpoint, Brown & Benchmark, 1993
- Sixteenth Century Counterpoint, Brown & Benchmark, 1994
