= Peter Graham (composer) =

British brass band composer

Peter Graham (born 1958) is a prolific British composer for brass band.

Graham was born in Lanarkshire, Scotland. He studied at the University of Edinburgh and then undertook postgraduate studies with Edward Gregson at Goldsmiths College, University of London. He holds a PhD in composition.

From 1983 until 1986, he lived in New York City, where he worked as a freelance composer/arranger and as a publications editor with the S.A. Music Bureau. Since his return to the U.K., he has worked regularly as an arranger for BBC Television and Radio and has specialised in composition for brass band. Since the publication of Dimensions (1983), he has carved out a niche as an outstanding arranger for brass bands, and a leading figure amongst contemporary band composers. His original compositions, which include The Essence of Time, Montage and Journey to the Centre of the Earth, are performed worldwide and have been selected as test pieces for National Championships in Australia, New Zealand, North America and across Europe.

His music for wind and concert band has been recorded and performed by many of the world’s leading ensembles, including the Tokyo Kosei Wind Orchestra and the Royal Norwegian Navy Band. Harrison's Dream, commissioned by the United States Air Force Band, Washington D.C., won the 2002 American Bandmasters Association Ostwald Award for composition. Commissioned by BMG/RCA Red Label to arrange and compose an album of xylophone music for virtuoso Evelyn Glennie, the resulting recording was nominated as Best Classical Crossover Album at the 1999 Grammy Awards held in Los Angeles.

Graham's music for brass has also been arranged for various ensembles, from fanfare orchestras of the Benelux countries to marching bands of the US. The Blue Knights Drum and Bugle Corps’ highest-ranked show to date (a 6th-place finish from their 2000 production entitled Colors of Brass and Percussion) was built entirely around his compositions The Essence of Time and Montage. The 2006 Bands of America Grand National Champions from Broken Arrow High School featured his music Harrison's Dream. Both the Santa Clara Vanguard Drum and Bugle Corps and Blue Devils Drum and Bugle Corps performed excerpts from Triumph of Time in their 2017 shows (entitled Ouroboros and Metamorph, respectively), while Vanguard performed excerpts from Metropolis 1927 and Journey to the Centre of the Earth in their award-winning championship 2018 show.

Graham has held posts as Music Associate with the Black Dyke Band (1997–2004), and as composer-in-residence with Her Majesty's Coldstream Guards Band. He lives in Cheshire, England, with his wife and children. He is currently Professor of Composition at the University of Salford, specializing in arranging and composing for the brass and wind band lineup.

== Discography ==
- Peter Graham
- Call of the Cossacks
- Gaelforce
- The Red Machine
- The Peter Graham Collection
