= Anthony Iannaccone =

American composer and conductor (born 1943)

Anthony Joseph Iannaccone (born October 14, 1943 in Brooklyn, New York) is an American composer and conductor. His music has been performed by major orchestras and chamber ensembles, and he has conducted numerous regional and metropolitan orchestras in the United States and in Europe. He was a conductor and professor at Eastern Michigan University, from which he retired at the end of the winter semester of 2013.

He studied with Aaron Copland (1959–1964); with David Diamond, Vittorio Giannini, and Ludmila Ulehla at the Manhattan School of Music, from which he earned a master's degree (1962–1968); and with Samuel Adler at the Eastman School of Music, from which he earned a doctoral degree. During the 1960s he supported himself as an orchestral violinist, and taught at the Manhattan School of Music from 1966 to 1968. He taught at Eastern Michigan University from 1971, where he founded an electronic music studio, taught composition, and for 30 years conducted the Collegium Chamber Orchestra and Chorus, focusing on late eighteenth- and early nineteenth-century repertory.

He won first prize from the National Band Association in 1988 for Apparitions, won the SAI/C.F. Peters Competition in 1990 for Two-Piano Inventions, and won American Bandmasters Association's Ostwald Award in 1995 for Sea Drift. His Waiting for Sunrise on the Sound was chosen as one of five finalists in the 2001 London Symphony Orchestra Masterprize Competition from an international field of 1151 orchestral works submitted.

== Selected works ==
Iannaccone has published approximately fifty works, including:

- Parodies for woodwind quintet (1958)
- Piano Trio (1959)
- Sonata for viola and piano (1961)
- Symphony No. 1 "Passage to Whitman" (1965)
- Symphony No. 2 (1966)
- Remembrance for viola and piano (1968)
- Walt Whitman Song (1980)
- Divertimento for orchestra (1983)
- A Whitman Madrigal (1984)
- Two-Piano Inventions (1990)
- Night Rivers, Symphony No. 3 (1990–92)
- Waiting for Sunrise on the Sound for orchestra (1998)
- From Time to Time (2000)
- Clarinet Quintet (2002); written on commission for clarinetist Richard Stoltzman
- The Labyrinth (2003)
