= Andrew David Perkins =

American composer (born 1978)

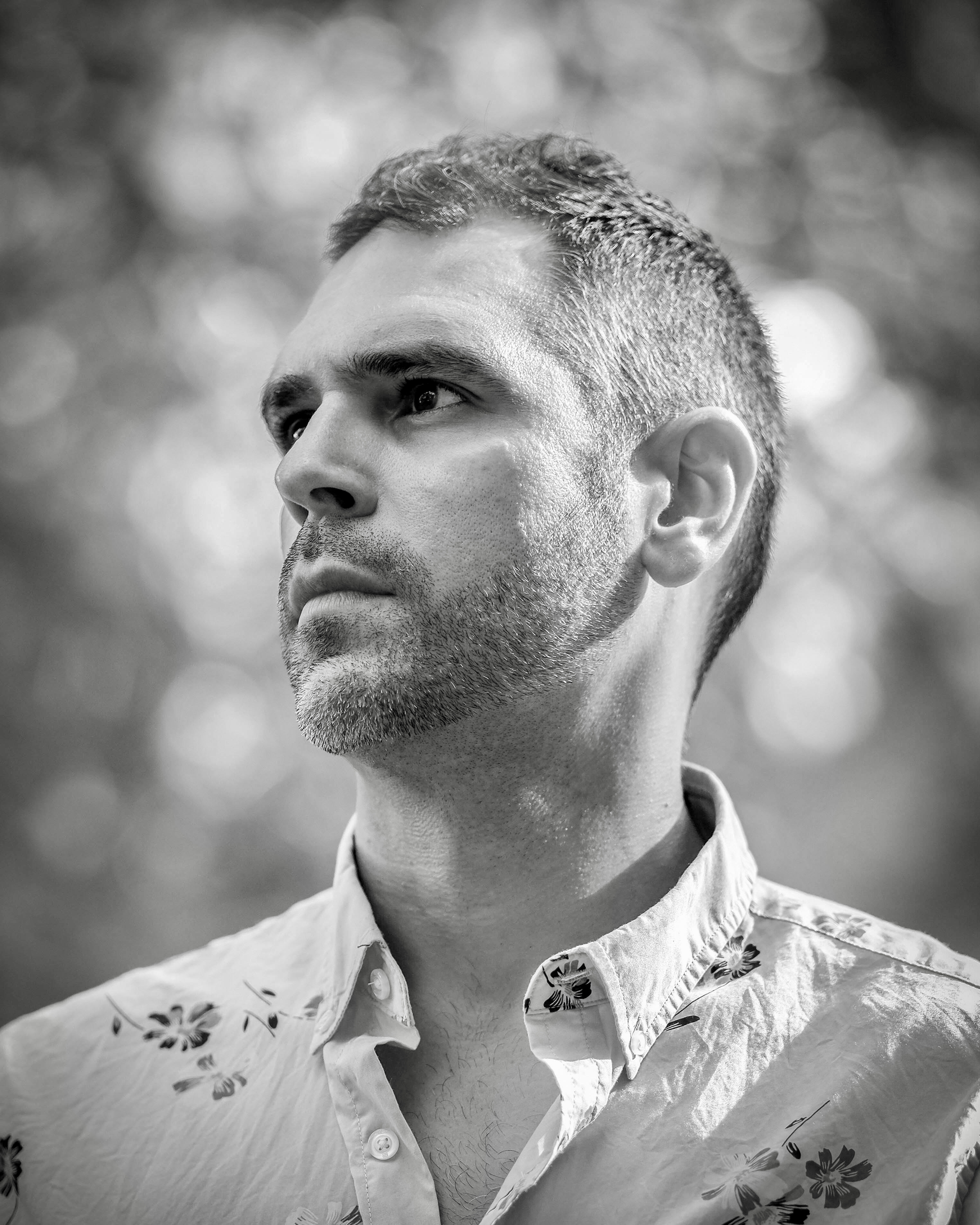

Background information
- Born: December 31, 1978 (age 47); Royal Oak, Michigan
- Genres: Contemporary, classical
- Occupations: Composer, conductor, music educator, clinician
- Website: www.andrewdavidperkins.com

Andrew David Perkins (born December 31, 1978) is an American music educator, conductor and composer of contemporary classical music, with an emphasis on music for wind band.

== Background ==
Born in Royal Oak, Michigan, Perkins grew up in Rochester Hills, Michigan, where he attended Rochester Adams High School and graduated in 1997. He spent the summers of 1995 and 1996 at the Interlochen Arts Camp in Michigan’s Northern Lower Peninsula before earning a Bachelor of Fine Arts degree from Michigan State University in 2002. In 2007 he received a Master of Music degree from the University of Michigan, followed by a specialist certificate in Orchestration from the Berklee College of Music in 2012. Perkins spent several seasons as a marching member and conductor of The Phantom Regiment Drum and Bugle Corps from Rockford, Illinois. His compositions for band have been finalists for The National Band Association’s William D. Revelli Memorial Composition Contest & Merrill Jones Award, and the Ravel International Composition Prize. His composition “Gradients” was the winner of the 2018 National Band Association/Alfred Publishing Young Band Composition Contest. In 2023, Perkins' concert band suite "TUEBOR" was selected as the winner of the American Bandmasters Association Sousa/Ostwald Composition Contest.

Perkins was an adjunct professor of Film Scoring at Madonna University in Livonia, Michigan as well as the Director of Instrumental Music and Music Technology at Fenton Area Public Schools in Fenton, Michigan. He has held the position of Music Director and Conductor of the Fenton Community Orchestra since 2011. Perkins is a member of the American Society of Composers Authors and Publishers (ASCAP) and has received multiple ASCAP Plus awards from the organization, as well as a 2017 nomination for the GRAMMY Music Educator’s Award.

== The Birds ==
In 2015, Perkins composed a full-length orchestral score to accompany Alfred Hitchcock’s 1963 Universal Pictures film The Birds, which was originally released without musical underscore. The music was performed live by the Fenton Community Orchestra synchronously with the film in February 2016 at the Fenton Cultural & Community Center, and encore performances were held in October of the same year. Composed in the compositional style of Bernard Herrmann, Perkins’ score reinterpreted the experience of the movie from an aesthetic perspective, drawing the film into the reality of the audience and the live music being performed.

== Works ==
=== Concert Band ===
- Kaufman’s Cove (2026)
- Jet Set (2025)
- Craig an Tuirc (2024)
- Unified Field Theory (2024)
- From Ould Inishowen (2024)
- Malleus Maleficarum (2023)
- Burn After Reading (2023)
- Mackinac Island Suite (2023)
- The Praetorian (2023)
- Hymnsong (2022)
- Escher Sketches (2022)
- Skeletonic (2022)
- Whyclops?! (2022)
- Société Blue (2022)
- Vox Nostra (2022)
- Left Of Boom (2022)
- Helioscape (2021)
- Among The Leaves So Green (2021)
- On Shoulders Of Giants (2021)
- Horror Vacui (2020)
- Empire Bluff (2020)
- Tuebor Suite (2020), American Bandmasters Association Sousa/Ostwald Award 2023 Winner
- Clutch. (2019),
- Kodachrome (2018)
- Until The Night Collapses (2018)
- The Raptor Rides The Whale (2018), National Band Association/Merrill Jones Award 2018 Finalist
- Gradients (2017), National Band Association/Alfred Publishing Young Band Composition Contest 2018 Winner
- Asylum (2017), National Band Association William D. Revelli Memorial Composition Contest 2018 Finalist, Ravel International Composition Prize 2017 Finalist
- Conspiracy Theories (2016)
- Prayers in Villefranche (2016)
- Southeast by Northwest (2016)
- Trip The Light Fantastic (2015)
- Alcatraz (2014)

=== Full Orchestra ===
- The Praetorian (2023)
- Rushlight (2018)
- Prayers in Villefranche (2016)
- The Birds (2015)
- Percussion Concerto (2013)
- Projections (2012)

=== String Orchestra ===
- Bauhaus (2019)
- Kodachrome (2018)
- Prayers in Villefranche (2016)

=== Small Ensemble ===
- Float (2023)
- In Three (2023)
- Cease & Desist (2023)
- Thinking about the immortality of the crab (2023)
- Some Assembly Required (2022)
- Noble Gases (2017)
