= Martin Mailman =

American classical composer

Martin S. Mailman (30 June 1932, in New York City – 18 April 2000, in Denton, Texas) was an American composer noted for his music for orchestra, chorus, multimedia, and winds.

== Biography ==
Mailman was born in New York City on June 30, 1932.

He studied composition at the Eastman School of Music at the University of Rochester earning a bachelor's degree in music composition in 1954, a master's degree in music composition in 1955, and a PhD in music composition in 1960. His teachers at Eastman included Louis Mennini, Wayne Barlow, Bernard Rogers, and Howard Hanson.

He served for two years in the United States Navy.

He was among the first group of young contemporary American composers chosen in 1959 to participate in the Young Composers Project, sponsored by the Ford Foundation and the National Music Council. As a result, he spent two years teaching in the schools of Jacksonville, Florida. From 1961 to 1966, he served as the first Composer in Residence at East Carolina University in Greenville, North Carolina. From 1966 until 2000, he was Composer in Residence, Coordinator of Composition, and later, Regents Professor at the University of North Texas College of Music in Denton, Texas. In November 2000, the University of North Texas Board of Regents awarded emeritus status to Mailman posthumously.

Mailman received numerous awards, among which include two American Bandmasters Association/Ostwald Awards for composition, the National Band Association/Band Mans Company prize for composition, the Edward Benjamin Award, Composer of the Year by the Texas Music Teachers Association, and the 1982 Queen Marie-Jose Prize for composition for his Concerto for Violin and Orchestra (Variations), Op. 68. His works include chamber music, band, choral, and orchestral music, film scores, television music, an opera, and a requiem for chorus, orchestra, and soloist. A frequently sought-after clinician and teacher, Mailman served as guest conductor-composer at more than ninety colleges and universities across the United States and Europe.

He was a leader in promoting comprehensive musicianship programs through MENC throughout his career and gave presentations at conventions and schools across the country. Instead of featuring his own music, he focused on music in general and the impact it has on students and professionals alike. He was particularly intrigued by the compositional process and the concept of music as "organized sound over time with intent."

Mailman's musical holdings are now handled by his son, Dr. Matthew Mailman, professor of Conducting in the Wanda L. Bass School of Music at Oklahoma City University.

His widow, Mary Nan Mailman (1929–2016), established two endowed scholarships in his name: the Martin Mailman Excellence in Band Endowed Scholarship in the Wanda L. Bass School of Music at Oklahoma City University, and the Martin Mailman Memorial Composition Scholarship Endowment in the College of Music at the University of North Texas.

== List of works ==
Burlesque for Trumpet & Piano, Op. 1 (1951)

Dance in Two Moods for Orchestra, Op. 2 (1952)

Promenade for Brass & Percussion, Op. 3 (1953)

Autumn Landscape for Orchestra, Op. 4 (1954)

Jubliate for Orchestra, Op. 5 (1955)

Elegy for Orchestra, Op. 6 (1955)

West Wind for Soprano & Piano, Op. 7 (1956)

Holy, Holy, Holy for Chorus & Organ, Op. 8 (1957)

Cantiones for Orchestra, Op. 9 (1957)

Partita for Band, Op. 10 (1958)

The Hunted: An opera in one act, Op. 11 (1959)

Christmas Music for Chorus & Orchestra, Op. 12 (1959)

Prelude and Fugue No. 1 for Orchestra, Op. 13 (1959)

Commencement March for Band, Op. 14 (1960)

Alleluia for Chorus & Band, Op. 15 (1960)

Three Madrigals for Chorus alone, Op. 16 (1960)

Partita for String Orchestra, Op. 17 (1960)

Gateway City Overture for Orchestra, Op. 18 (1960)

Four Miniatures for Band, Op. 19 (1960)

Genesis Resurrected for Narrator, Chorus & Orchestra, Op. 20 (1960)

Petite Partita for Piano, Op. 21 (1961)

Geometrics No. 1 for Band, Op. 22 (1961)

Suite in Three Movements for Orchestra, Op. 23 (1961)

Brevard Fanfare for Brass, Op. 24 (1961)

Hosanna for Chorus, Op. 25 (1961)

String Quartet in one movement, Op. 26 (1962)

Alarums for Band, Op. 27 (1962)

Four Songs for Soprano & Piano, Op. 28 (1962)

Geometrics in Sound (Geometrics No. 2) for Band, Op. 29 (1962)

Prelude and Fugue No. 2 for Orchestra, Op. 30, #1 (1963)

Leaves of Grass for Narrator, Chorus & Band, Op. 30, #2 (1963)

Concertino for Trumpet & Band, Op. 31 (1963)

To Everything There is a Season for Chorus alone, Op. 32 (1963)

Liturgical Music for Band, Op. 33 (1964)

Sinfonietta for Orchestra, Op. 34 (1964). May 8, 1966 premiere, East Carolina College (i.e. East Carolina University), Wright Auditorium, Greenville, NC, Martin Mailman conducting.

Moby Dick: Music for the Play, Op. 35 (1965)

Four Variations in Search For a Theme for Narrator & Band, Op. 36 (1965)

Geometrics No. 3 for Band, Op. 37 (1965)

Theme Music for Concepts, Op. 38 (1965)

Variations on a Short Theme for piano, Op. 39 (1966)

Four Divisions for Percussion Ensemble, Op. 40 (1966)

The Rise and Fall: A Choral Fable, Op. 41 (1966)

The Whaleman’s Chapel from Moby Dick, Op. 41A (1966)

Partita No. 4 for nine players, Op. 42 (1967)

Geometrics No. 4 for Band, Op. 43 (1968)

Shakespearean Serenade for Chorus & four instruments, Op. 44 (1968)

Association No. 1 for Band, Op. 45 (1968–69)

Symphony No. 1 for Orchestra, Op. 46 (1969)

Generations 2 for 3 String Orchestras & Percussion, Op. 47 (1969)

Martha’s Vineyard for Piano, Op. 48 (1969)

Two Fanfares for Brass, Op. 49 (1970)

In Memoriam Frankie Newton for Lab Band, Op. 50 (1970)

Requiem, Requiem for Chorus, Orchestra & Soloists, Op. 51 (1970)

Shouts, Hymns, and Praises for Band, Op. 52 (1972)

A Simple Ceremony (In Memoriam John Barnes Chance) for Band & Chorus, Op. 53 (1973)

Decorations (Music for a Celebration) for Band, Op. 54 (1974)

In Memoriam Silvio Scionti, Op. 55 (Piano) (1974)

Let Us Now Praise Famous Men, Op. 56 (Band, Narrators, & Solo Voice) (1975)

Wind Across the Nations, Op. 57 (Solo Voice, Piano, Percussion, Flute, & Guitar) (1975)

Geometrics 5 for Band, Op. 58 (1976)

Generations 3: Messengers, Op. 59 (Children Choirs, Solo Tenor, & Stage Band) (1977)

A Choral Sampler, Op. 60 (1977)

Clastics: Formations for Solo Cello, Op. 61 (1977)

Clastics 2 for Euphonium & Percussion, Op. 62 (1979)

Symphony No. 2 for Orchestra, Op. 63 (1979)

Soft Sounds for a Wordless Night, Op. 64 (Chorus) (1979)

Clastics 3: Music for Two Pianos, Op. 65 (1980)

Night Vigil for Band, Op. 66 (1980)

Exaltations for Band, Op. 67 (1981)

Concerto for Violin and Orchestra (Variations), Op. 68 (1982)

Secular Hours for Chorus, Op. 69 (1982)

Symphony No. 3 (Fantasies) for Orchestra, Op. 70 (1983)

Cantata for Jazz Choir, Soloists, & large Jazz Ensemble, Op. 71 (1984)

Nocturne for Trumpet Choir, Op. 72 (1985)

Trio for Violin, Cello, and Piano, Op. 73 (1985)

Elegy for String Orchestra, Op. 74 (1985)

Liturgy for Four Cities (summer, 1985) for Voice & Piano, Op. 75 (1985)

Mirrors: A Multimedia Theater Piece, Op. 76 (1986)

Mirror Music for Orchestra, Op. 77 (1987)

The Jewel in the Crown (A Ceremonial March) for Band, Op. 78 (1987)

Clastics 4: Music for Solo Viola, Op. 79 (1988)

For precious friends hid in death’s dateless night for Wind Ensemble, Op. 80 (1988)

Six Brief Obituaries for Piano, Op. 81 (1988)

Toward the Second Century for Band/opt. Strings, Op. 82 (1989)

Concertino for Clarinet and Band, Op. 83 (1990)

Three Choral Praises, Op. 84 (1990)

Love Letters from Margaret for Soprano & Orchestra, Op. 85 (1991)

Surfaces for Woodwind Quintet, Op. 86 (1991)

Bouquets for Band, Op. 87 (1991)

This Fragile Day for Chorus, Op. 88 (1992)

Concerto for Wind Orchestra (Variations), Op. 89 (1993)

Secular Litanies for Band, Op. 90 (1993)

Agnus Dei for Choir & Organ, Op. 91 (1994)

Two Fanfares for Brass Choir, Op. 92 (1997)

Fanfare Folio for Brass, Op. 92 (1994/1997)

String Quartet No. 2: 1995, Op. 93 (1995)

Colleagues Remembered for Chorus, Op. 94 (1995)

Work incomplete (Opus 95) (1995)

Dance Imageries for Orchestra, Op. 96 (1998)

Choral Greetings, Op. 97 (1998)

Pledges for Band, Op. 98 (1998)

Vocalise for Solo Soprano (or solo tenor voice or alto saxophone) & Piano, Op. 99 (1999)
