= E. Anne Schwerdtfeger =

American composer

Elizabeth Anne Schwerdtfeger (1 February 1930 - 11 September 2008) was an American composer, choral conductor, educator, and Fulbright scholar who spent several years as a Dominican nun and was also known as Sister Mary Ernest O.P. (Ordo Praedicatorum). She was known professionally as E. Anne Schwerdtfeger.

Schwerdtfeger was born in Galveston, Texas, to Frances McLaughlin and Ernest Paul Schwerdtfeger. In 1950, she lived in a Dominican convent and studied at the Dominican College in Houston. She earned a Bachelor of Music degree at the University of Texas in 1953 and a Master of Music degree at the University of Notre Dame in 1963. Her teachers included Arthur Hall, Clifton Williams, and Carl Hager. She received a Fulbright scholarship to study in France in 1963 and 1964. In 1969, the Dominican Sisters of Houston, Texas, commissioned Schwerdtfeger to compose Two Pieces for women's voices based on text by Rabindranath Tagore. She chaired the Dominican College music department until 1972.

In 1975, Schwerdtfeger earned a B. Oriental Liturgy from the Pontifical Oriental Institute in Rome, and a Lic. Oriental Liturgy in 1977. She remained in Rome until her death in 2008. Her compositions included:

== Chamber ==
- Modal Suite (harp and tuba)
- Variations on an Irish Air (six harps)

== Orchestra ==
- Christus Rex (chamber orchestra)
- Exaudi Domine (string orchestra)
- Symphony in One Movement

== Organ ==
- Fugue (organ)

== Piano ==
- Charivari
- Modal Suite
- Three Pieces
- Toccatina

== Vocal ==
- Amo Christum (women's chorus)
- Ave Maria Stella (women's chorus)
- Cantata
- Hymn of St. Francis (women's chorus)
- Mass of St. Martin de Porres (unison voices and organ)
- O Sacrum Convivium (women's chorus)
- Two Pieces (women's chorus and organ; text by Tagore)
