= Sousa/Ostwald Award =

American music award

The Sousa/Ostwald Award is an annual award given by the American Bandmasters Association for a composition for concert band. It was first awarded in 1956, after band uniform suppliers Ernest and Adolph Ostwald established the ABA/Ostwald Award for the best band composition written in the previous year. Previous rules allowed for compositions of grades 1-6, but the rules are undergoing a transition to focus on grades 1-4 (in 2011) and 5-6 (in 2012). The award was renamed from the Ostwald Award in 2011.

== Recipients ==
Year	Composition	Composer
1956	Fanfare and Allegro	J. Clifton Williams
1957	Symphonic Suite	J. Clifton Williams
1958	Portrait of the Land	J. Mark Quinn
1959	Introduction and Scherzo	Maurice Weed
1960	Overture in G	Florian Mueller
1961	Cumberland Gap Overture	Joseph Willcox Jenkins
1962	Concertino for Band	Fritz Velke
1963	Concert Suite	Frederic H. Ashe
1964	Symphony for Band	Robert E. Jager
1965	Overture for Band	Frederick Beyer
1966	Variations on a Korean Folk Song	John Barnes Chance
1967	Daedalic Symphony	Lawrence Weiner
1968	Diamond Variations	Robert E. Jager
1969	Aria and Toccata	Richard Willis
1970	Toccata	Fisher Tull
1971	Divertimento for Concert Band	Karl Kroeger
1972	Sinfonietta	Robert E. Jager
1973	Festival Fanfare March	Roger Nixon
1974	Visions	James S. Sclater
1975	Jubiloso	Robert M. Panerio, Sr.
1976	Todesband	Lorette Jankowski
1977	Danses Sacred and Profane	William H. Hill
1978	Symphony, Opus 35	James Barnes
1979	(No Winner Chosen)	
1980	Mutanza	James E. Curnow
1981	Visions Macabre	James Barnes
1982	Armies of the Omnipresent Otserf	David R. Holsinger
1983	Exaltations	Martin Mailman
1984	Symphonic Variants for Euphonium and Band	James E. Curnow
1985	Symphony for Winds and Percussion	Joseph H. Downing
1986	In the Spring, at the Time When the Kings Go Off to War	David R. Holsinger
1987	Synergistic Parable	David Sartor
1988	Piece of Mind	Dana Wilson
1989	For Precious Friends Hid in Death's Dateless Night	Martin Mailman
1990	Fire Works	Gregory Youtz
1991	The Soaring Hawk	Timothy Mahr
1992	Endurance	Timothy Mahr (Commission)
1993	Passacaglia (Homage on B-A-C-H)	Ron Nelson
1994	Chaconne (In Memoriam)	Ron Nelson (Commission)
1995	Sea Drift	Anthony Iannaccone
1996	Psalms for a Great Country	Anthony Iannaccone (Commission)
1997	Zion	Dan Welcher
1998	Circular Marches	Dan Welcher (Commission)
1999	Fantasy Variations	Donald Grantham
2000	Southern Harmony	Donald Grantham (Commission)
2001	(No Winner Chosen)	
2002	Harrison's Dream	Peter Graham
2003	(No Contest Held)	
2004	(No Contest Held)	
2005	Redline Tango	John Mackey
2006	(No Contest Held)	
2007	Raise the Roof	Michael Daugherty
2008	(No Contest Held)	
2009	Aurora Awakes	John Mackey
2010	(No Contest Held)	
2011	Songs for Wind Ensemble	Yo Goto
2012	Flourishes and Meditations	Michael Gandolfi
2013	Pale Blue on Deep	Aaron Perrine
2014	Concerto for Alto Saxophone	Steven Bryant
2015	Only Light	Aaron Perrine
2016	Masks and Machines	Paul Dooley
2017	A Cypress Prelude	Christopher Lowry
2018	Symphony No. 2 "Voices"	James Stephenson
2019	Unquiet Hours	David Biedenbender
2020	The Seer	Erik Santos
2021	Perpetua	Peter Meechan
2022	Sinfonia	Zhou Tian
2023	Tuebor Suite	Andrew David Perkins
2024	River of Time	David Biedenbender
2025	Concerto for Euphonium and Band	Tom Davoren
