= Timothy Mahr =

- Timothy Mahr

Background information
- Born: Timothy Mahr; March 20, 1956 (age 70); Reedsburg, Wisconsin
- Genres: Wind Literature
- Occupations: Composer, Conductor, Clinician, Musician
- Years active: 1990–present
- Website: St. Olaf Biography

Timothy Mahr (born March 20, 1956) is an American composer and conductor. He previously conducted the St. Olaf Band for 29 years before his retirement in 2023.

== Early life ==
Mahr was born in Reedsburg, Wisconsin. He earned a Bachelor of Music degree in Theory and Composition in 1977 and a Bachelor of Arts degree in Music Education in 1978, both from St. Olaf College in Northfield, Minnesota. In 1983 he completed a Master's degree at the University of Iowa in Trombone Performance. He completed his doctorate Musical Arts in Instrumental Conducting in 1995, also at the University of Iowa.

== Professional work ==
He is Past President of the North Central Division of the College Band Directors National Association (1999–2001) and has served on the board of directors of the National Band Association and the Minnesota Band Directors Association. Mahr remains active as a guest conductor and clinician, in demand as a guest composer/conductor on over 35 college and university campuses.

Mahr's compositions have been performed by ensembles worldwide, and many have been published. The first recipient of a commission from the American Bandmasters Association Commissioning Project, Mahr continues to be commissioned by universities, colleges, high schools, state band associations and community groups nationally. Notable commissions include works for the Music Educators National Conference, the Kappa Kappa Psi/Tau Beta Sigma National Intercollegiate Band, the 50th anniversary of the American School Band Directors Association and the United States Air Force Band. He received the 1991 ABA/Ostwald Award for his work "The Soaring Hawk." Mahr was elected to membership in the American Bandmasters Associations in 1993.

Mahr conducted the Massachusetts All-State band at Symphony Hall in Boston (2000). This performance featured his outstanding original score, "Endurance," based on Shackleton's attempt to reach the South Pole.

In 2010, Mahr was a clinician for the 50th anniversary of the WELS National Band Festival in Onalaska, WI at Luther High School. He composed the piece "Tres Solas" (which has not been released yet) specifically for this event.

In 2023, he retired from his position as a professor of music at St. Olaf College and conductor of the St. Olaf Band.

== Accomplishments ==
Mahr is perhaps best known for his compositions for concert band, including the highly descriptive tone poem "The Soaring Hawk" (1990), and "Endurance" (1991) (commissioned by the American Bandmasters Association Commissioning Project). His compositions are often performed by high school and university symphony bands and wind ensembles, but professional groups, such as the Minnesota Symphonic Winds and the United States Air Force Band also perform his works.

Mahr's perhaps most famous work, Dig Down Deep, Grade 3, has been performed and loved by many, including the St. Olaf Band. In January 2018, the St. Olaf Band performed this piece on a joint concert with an elementary summer band, and the performance was adored by all who came to listen.

== Family life ==
He is married to Jill Mahr, music performer and educator, and they have two children, Jenna and Heron.
