= David Holsinger =

American composer and conductor (born 1945)

- Born: December 26, 1945 (age 80); Hardin, Missouri
- Occupations: Conductor, composer
- Years active: 1966 - present

David Rex Holsinger is an American composer and conductor writing primarily for concert band. Holsinger is a graduate of Hardin-Central High School in Hardin, Missouri, Central Methodist University, the University of Central Missouri, and the University of Kansas.

== Conducting positions ==
In February 1992, Holsinger guest conducted the District VI Symphonic Band in Virginia.

In 1999, following 15 years of service as music minister, worship leader, and composer in residence to Shady Grove Church in Grand Prairie, Texas, he joined the School of Music faculty at Lee University, Cleveland, Tennessee, creating the Lee University Wind Ensemble, which he conducted until 2023. Holsinger’s duties included teaching advanced instrumental conducting and composition.

In 1999, Holsinger conducted the Kentucky All-State Symphonic Band. Some of his works that were played and recorded included To Tame The Perilous Skies, Consider the Uncommon Man, and On An American Spiritual.

In the spring of 2000, Holsinger conducted the Georgia Southern Symphonic Band and the Georgia Southern Symphonic Wind Ensemble in Statesboro, GA.

Over the past several years, Holsinger has been named a National Patron of Delta Omicron Music Fraternity, awarded the Distinguished Music Alumni Award from Central Missouri State University, Phi Mu Alpha Sinfonia’s Orpheus Award, as well as, honorary memberships in Kappa Kappa Psi National Band Fraternity and the Women’s National Band Directors Association.

In April 2003, Holsinger was presented the Distinguished Alumni Award from Central Methodist College, and the following month, at Graduation Ceremonies, Paul Conn, President of Lee University presented the composer with the university’s prestigious “Excellence in Scholarship” faculty award for his continued achievement in musical composition.

In February 2009, Holsinger conducted the District VIII Symphonic Band in Virginia. In the spring of 2009, Holsinger guest conducted the District V Honor Band in Georgia.

In the spring of 2010, Holsinger guest conducted the West Virginia All-State Band in which he has composed a piece for titled "Coal Mountain Portrait.". This is the second time Holsinger has guest conducted the West Virginia All-State Band, the first in the spring of 2007.

In February 2011, Holsinger guest conducted the district VII Symphonic Band in Virginia, where he premiered his new piece titled "Solemn Hymn & Rowdy Dance."

In February 2015, Holsinger guest conducted the "Tennessee Band" in the 36th West Virginia University Invitational High School Honor Bands.

He currently serves as the conductor of the Lee University Wind Ensemble at Lee University, Cleveland, Tennessee.

In July 2015, Holsinger suffered two strokes while he was in New Orleans conducting the Phi Mu Alpha International Honors Band at their convention. Upon his return to Chattanooga, he was admitted to Memorial Hospital and was diagnosed, medicated and treated. He was then moved to Siskin Rehabilitation Hospital where he received physical therapy. He soon returned home and back to teaching at Lee University, although on a limited schedule, with his recovery going well.

In January 2019, Holsinger conducted the Louisiana District VI Senior High Honor Band.

== Compositions ==
Holsinger has served as Visiting Composer in Residence at many American colleges or universities, and held the Acuff Chair of Excellence in the Creative Arts at Austin Peay State University, Clarksville, Tennessee. In 1999, the Christian Instrumental Directors Association awarded Holsinger its “Director of the Year” citation.

Compositions by Holsinger receiving outstanding reviews include The Easter Symphony, a three-movement, 55-minute chorale symphony based on the Passion of Christ and commissioned by The Gustavus Band in 1995, and To Tame the Perilous Skies, commissioned by the U.S. Air Force Tactical Air Command Band. Reviewers have also given high marks to the memorial work, Consider the Uncommon Man; Praises, a six-movement ballet suite; Scrappy Bumptoe’s Picture Cards and Ragtag Diary, composed for the Kansas Brass Quintet; Sinfonia Voci for band and choir; and The Song of Moses, a four movement band/choral work premiered by the United States Air Force Band and Singing Sergeants and selected for broadcast nationally on a National Public Radio Special Project on Vocal Music in August, 1997.

Other oft-played works in Holsinger’s catalogue include The War Trilogy: 1971, a special edition of the Kent State contest winner; Abram’s Pursuit; a rollicking overture based on a story from the Book of Genesis; and Adagio, which was composed in the memory of a departed friend.

== Works ==
His works include:

- Abram's Pursuit, an overture based on a story of Abram from the Book of Genesis
- At The Strongholds of En Gedi
- A Childhood Hymn, which is based on the hymnsong "Jesus Loves Me"
- Adagio, composed in memory of a departed friend; an emotional synthesis of joy and pain.
- American Faces, an overture celebrating the diversity of America
- Ballet Exaltare, a Grade 5 piece written in a somewhat more classical style for Holsinger
- Ballet Sacra, commissioned by the 1990 North Hills High School Symphony Band in Pittsburgh, Pennsylvania, is a 15-minute work that includes a short choir part in the middle section
- Battle Music (2001), a work inspired by Revelations 12:7; “And there was war in Heaven ..”
- The Case of the Mysterious Stranger
- Cityscapes
- Cluster Fluster Bluster March
- Coal Mountain Portrait, commissioned by the WV Bandmasters Association for the 2010 WV All-State Band which he conducted in its debut on March 6, 2010
- Consider The Uncommon Man, a memorial work
- Divertimented Dances, a series of seven dances composed for the 2006 Massachusetts All-State Festival
- Deerpath Dances
- The Easter Symphony, a three-movement, 55 minute chorale symphony based on the Passion of Christ
- Elegy on an American Folktune: Remembering Erin Suzanne Hutchison
- Every Morning New
- Falcon Attack!
- Fanfare for Brass and Tympani
- Fantasy on a Gaelic Hymnsong
- Festiva Jubiloso
- Fort Canterbury March
- The Gathering of the Ranks at Hebron
- Gears Pulleys Chains (2005), a playful tribute to the mechanical history of Shelby, Ohio
- Graysondance (1995), written for Holsinger's son, Grayson; the piece is characterized by a jazzy mood, featuring walking bass lines
- Gmyway's Revenge! (1994) This piece is a three-movement work for symphonic band. It was written for the tenth anniversary of the Greater Milwaukee Youth Wind Ensemble, reflected in the name of the piece. The first movement of the piece is entitled "Alla Brashly Bravura: 'Enter the Hero, Sir Gmyway of Vordak,'" characterized by its rather whimsical nature. The second movement, "Intermezzo? Thoughtso!: 'The Beguiling Countess Adnil,'" is a considerable shift in character, beginning with a lonesome flute solo and slowly augmenting to include the rest of the band. The third, and perhaps most infamous (among band students, horn players, esp.), movement is entitled "Presto Zoomissimo-issimo-issimo!:'In Pursuit of Rattazinski, der Villain!'" It is perpetually kinetic, often characterized by a syncopated 5/4 rhythm. The names of these movements have significance in the context of the premiere of the piece. "Vordak" is a rearrangement of "Dvorak," the surname of the conductor of this piece's premiere. "Adnil" is simply Dvorak's wife's first name (Linda) spelled backward. Finally, "Rattazinski" refers to a rival conductor. Gmyway's Revenge is considered a staple of the concert band literature.
- Gypsydance
- Havendance (1985) overture for concert band, written for Holsinger's daughter, Haven; the piece is arguably the most musically eclectic of the "Holsinger children" pieces
- Helm Toccata
- Hero Music (2005), commissioned to celebrate the life of a well loved Tennessee band director
- Homage: Three Tapestries, Holsinger's tribute to composer Vaclav Nelhybel
- In The Spring, at the Time When Kings Go Off to War A roughly 13 minute piece The composition is based on I Chronicles 20, verses 1 through 3. This short scripture tells of the gathering of King David’s armies under the command of Joab; the legions attack and siege of the land of the Amonites; the subsequent capture and execution of the Ammonite kings; the plunder and slavery of the surviving foe; and the triumphant return of David’s army to Jerusalem. This piece has the signature time variations with a main tune not dissimilar to his other work "To Tame the Perilous Skies"
- Lake Canterbury Regatta
- Liturgical Dances is subtitled Benedecamus Socii Domine which translates "Let us (all), as companions, Praise the Lord!"
- The Maelstrom, Commissioned for the L'Anse Creuse High School Wind Symphony in Harrison Township, Michigan.
- March of the Combat Patrol
- Mobbusters!
- Nilesdance (1987), written for Holsinger's son, Niles, characterized by a short repeating phrase
- On an American Spiritual is based upon the African hymnsong "Were you there?"
- On Ancient Hymns and Festal Dances
- On a Hymnsong of Lowell Mason is based on Lowell Mason's 1832 work Olivet (My Faith Looks Up To Thee).
- On a Hymnsong of Philip Bliss (1989) is Holsinger's translated American hymn “It is Well with my Soul”. It is his largest selling work and has been used in several televised memorial performances in recent years, including commemorative services for the Challenger astronauts, Ronald Reagan, and the fallen heroes of the American armed forces. This piece was written to honor Rev. Steve Edel, the retiring principal of Shady Grove Christian Academy, and was presented to him as a gift by the academy's concert band.
- On a Hymnsong of Robert Lowry
- On a Southern Hymnsong
- On The Grand Prairie Texas
- On The Overland Stage to El Paso
- One Day In a Small Town... (2004), a four-movement piece commissioned by the Fayette (Mo.) High School Music Boosters for director Roy "Skip" Vanedelicht after his 25th year at the school. First movement, titled "On a Breeze That Drifts About Courthouse Square" includes strains from "Barnum and Bailey's Favorite", the school song from Holsinger's alma mater, Central Methodist University. The song is played by marching band in all parades, and all parades will follow a route that goes around the courthouse square in Fayette. The second movement, titled "Dancing and Mischief in Liberty Park" is named for a city park located on the south side of the town. The third movement, titled "An Immeasurable Hero", is in reference to Vandelicht. The fourth movement, titled "Chasing the Band Bus on MO240" includes "Washington and Lee Swing", the fight song for Fayette High School. Missouri Route 240 goes through Fayette.
- Partita Allegro, for woodwind choir
- Peasant Dance Village
- Prelude and Rondo (1966), his first published piece.
- Prairie Dances It contains many alternating time signatures.
- Praises, a six-movement ballet suite
- Riding With the Frontier Battalion Commissioned by the Association of Texas Small School Bands for the 2000 ATSSB Symphonic Band. Holsinger conducted the premier performance.
- Scaling the North Wall
- Scootin’ on Hardrock, a jazz suite for concert band. Commissioned by the Grand Island, NY music program for the Grand Island, NY High School Wind Ensemble. Holsinger conducted the premier performance.
- Scrappy Bumptoe's Picture Cards and Ragtag Diary, composed for the Kansas Brass Quintet
- Solemn Hymn & Rowdy Dance, debuted at the Virginia District 7 All-District Band Concert on February 5, 2011 by the Senior Symphonic Band
- The Song of Moses, a four movement band/choral work premiered by the United States Air Force Band and Singing Sergeants and selected for broadcast nationally on a National Public Radio Special Project on Vocal Music in August 1997
- Sinfonia Voci for band and choir
- Symphonic Movement, commissioned by the Missouri Bandmasters Association for the 25th Anniversary of the Missouri All-State Band in 2001.
- Texas Promenade, celebrating the 50th Anniversary Convention of the Texas Bandmasters Association
- To Tame the Perilous Skies was commissioned by the 564th Tactical Air Command Band, United States Air Force, located in Virginia, and received its premiere performance in the fall of 1990. Although it leaves the storyline completely to the listener's imagination, "Perilous Skies" was conceived as a programmatic work literally depicting two opposing forces colliding in battle. The elongated canonic introduction presents a six-pitch intervallic display that is used throughout the composition, both as an intact melodic statement and a fragmented germative device, to depict every extra-musical element from serenity to air war to triumphal deliverance. Little did Holsinger realize the prophetic nature of the work, when at the time of its premiere the United Nations forces were assembling in the Persian Gulf; it was only a few months later that the world watched as modern technological air power "tamed the perilous skies" over Iraq and Kuwait. Then, in retrospect, this work is dedicated not only to the exceptional men and women of the Tactical Air Command, but to the spirit of the modern military aviator, taming the perilous skies that all men might live free of tyranny and oppression.
- The War Trilogy: 1971, a special edition of the Kent State University contest winner
- Zinphonia, premiered by the Virginia Wind Symphony at the 2017 Midwest Clinic in honor of Dennis Zeisler.
- Audrey Goes Exploring, premiered by the Lee University Student Honor Band at the 2021 Student Concert in honor of his granddaughter.

== Recordings ==
- The Symphonic Wind Music of David R. Holsinger, (Mark Recording Studios, Clarence, New York) feature major professional and university performing organizations in both live and studio sessions with the composer. Volumes 1 through 12 are available, and further volumes are planned. The first two discs were released in 1995. Volume 12 was released in 2016.
- Havendance was recorded in 1987 on "Yale University Concert Band in Japan, Denon 32CG-1877 (Yale Concert Band, dir. Thomas Duffy)

== Awards and recognition ==
- Holsinger was twice awarded the prestigious Sousa/Ostwald Award of the American Bandmasters Association.
- The April 1999 issue of The Instrumentalist magazine featured an interview with Holsinger and two articles concerning his compositions.
- Holsinger has been named a National Patron of the Delta Omicron Music Fraternity.
- He was awarded the Distinguished Music Alumni Award from the University of Central Missouri (formerly Central Missouri State University).
- He received Phi Mu Alpha Sinfonia’s Orpheus Award.
- He is an honorary member of Kappa Kappa Psi National Music Fraternity.
- He is an honorary member of the Women’s National Band Directors Association
- Holsinger was awarded an honorary Doctor of Humane Letters for lifetime achievement in composition by Gustavus Adolphus College, and presented the Gustavus Fine Arts Medallion, the division’s highest award.
- In April 2003, Holsinger was presented the Distinguished Alumni Award from Central Methodist University (formerly Central Methodist College)
- In May 2003, Lee University presented Holsinger with the university’s "Excellence in Scholarship" faculty award
- In November 2004, Holsinger was named the "2004 Honorary Alumnus of the Year" by the Alumni Association of Lee University.
- December 2010 - Awarded the Al G. Wright Award from the International Woman Banddirectors Association.
- 2011 - Outstanding Bandmaster of the year by Phi Beta Mu Band Fraternity.

== Drum and Bugle Corps ==
Holsinger's works have been very popular in the world of drum and bugle corps since the 1987 Cavaliers (3rd place) first put "Liturgical Dances" on the field. In 1992 Holsinger — himself a former marching band director — spent time with the Cadets to help them understand the music they were portraying with To Tame the Perilous Skies (2nd place). He then provided the compositions for the Cadets' 1993 gold medal win with In the Spring, at the Time When Kings Go Off to War, Ballet Sacra, and On a Hymnsong of Philip Bliss, defeating the Star of Indiana Drum and Bugle Corps by only one-tenth of a point. Other performances include: Prelude and Rondo (1981 Southwind), At the Strongholds of En Gedi (2000 Seattle Cascades), In the Spring, When Kings go off to War and On a Hymnsong of Philip Bliss (Both 1993 Cadets, 1st place), On an American Spiritual, Havendance, On a Hymnsong of Philip Bliss, Nilesdance, and On a Southern Hymnsong (all 1997 Sunrisers, 4th place DCA), Symphonia Resurrectus from Easter Symphony) (2002 Spirit and 2003 Magic of Orlando), The Symphonic Cantata (1993 The Cavaliers, 5th place), Abram's Pursuit (2001 Seattle Cascades, 2003 Magic of Orlando), as well as Battle Music (2007 Bluecoats, 7th place) and Scootin' on Hard Rock (2012 Fusion Core, 9th place DCA). Many of his works have been performed by Junior (DCI) and Senior (DCA) corps frequently since 1981.

== Other interests ==
Holsinger is also an active model railroader.
