= David P. Sartor =

American classical composer

- Born: 25 May 1956; Nashville, Tennessee
- Occupations: Composer, Conductor, Educator
- Years active: 1978–present
- Spouse: Nancy Sartor

David Sartor (rhymes with "Carter") is an American composer, conductor, and educator, and is the founder and music director of the Parthenon Chamber Orchestra.

== Composing and Conducting ==
Sartor is the composer of Synergistic Parable for symphonic band, which won the American Bandmasters Association's Ostwald Award for Symphonic Band Music, and of Polygon, for brass quintet, which received the National Fine Arts Award.

Other notable works include Metamorphic Fanfare, commissioned by the Knoxville Symphony Orchestra; Thy Light Is Come for chorus, organ, brass and timpani, commissioned by Christ Episcopal Church in Nashville and showcased at the Washington National Cathedral by the Cathedral Choral Society; Black Ball Counts Double for string orchestra, which received a commendation in England's Oare International Composing Competition; Reveries, for string orchestra, winner of the Burlington (Vermont) Chamber Orchestra's 2009 Composer Competition as well as a finalist in the Fauxharmonic Orchestra's Adagio Composition Contest; and Concerto for Orchestra, a finalist in the Columbia Symphony Orchestra's American Composer Competition. A fourteen-time honoree in the American Prizes, national awards celebrating American excellence in the arts, Sartor won Third Place nationally in their 2021 Competition for Orchestral Conducting - making him the only person to date to win American Prizes in three major categories: Conducting, Composition and Orchestral Performance. He has been designated as an "Honored Artist of the American Prize” in recognition of “sustained excellence” in the prestigious competitions.

Compositions by Sartor have been recognized with more than four dozen awards from ASCAP, Meet The Composer, Delta Omicron, and New Music for Young Ensembles, among others. His music has been featured at the Tanglewood and Aspen Music Festivals, the International Double Bass Festival, the Percussive Arts Society International Convention, the International Music Festival in San Jose Costa Rica, The World's Largest Organ Concert, the Sewanee Summer Music Festival, and at Carnegie Hall, with broadcast performances on National Public Radio and local affiliates.

His engagements as guest composer, conductor and lecturer include the Washington National Cathedral, the Knoxville Symphony Orchestra, the Chattanooga Symphony Orchestra, the Indiana Wind Symphony, the Nexus Chamber Orchestra, the Vanderbilt University Orchestra, Illinois State University, Middle Tennessee State University, Trevecca Nazarene University, the Knoxville Brass Choir, the University of Tennessee Brass Choir, the Dogwood Arts Festival Chamber Orchestra, and a conducting “mini-residency” at California State University sponsored by New York City’s Meet The Composer Foundation. He appears regularly as orchestra conductor at Bachanalia, an annual six-hour regional festival of works by Johann Sebastian Bach in downtown Nashville and is a frequent conductor of the Nashville Concerto Orchestra, featuring local and area soloists. He has been inducted as a National Patron of Delta Omicron International Music Fraternity in recognition of his accomplishments as a conductor and composer, alongside notable individuals such as Samuel Barber, William Schuman and Robert Shaw. In addition to his concert music activities Sartor is an alumnus of the Steven Scott Smalley Film Scoring Workshop as well as a recent workshop with Richard Glasser & Aaron Zigman, and has scored more than two dozen video documentaries and features.

Sartor's works are recorded on the Nexus label and are published by E.C. Schirmer, Shawnee Press, and Metamorphic Music and distributed worldwide by J. W. Pepper Music. He currently resides in Tennessee with his wife, author Nancy Sartor.

== Early life ==
Sartor was born May 25, 1956, in Nashville. Sartor attended McGavock High School in Nashville, where he was a charter member of the school's award-winning Wind Ensemble and marching band under the direction of Kenton J. Hull Jr. Both Hull and Mrs. Bobby Jean Frost, the school's piano and music theory teacher, encouraged Sartor's development as a composer, performer and conductor. While a student at McGavock he was Principal Trumpet in the Nashville Youth Symphony, the Middle Tennessee Honor Band and the Tennessee All-State Orchestra.

== Education and Teaching ==
Sartor studied at the Blair School of Music, the University of Cincinnati College-Conservatory of Music and the University of Tennessee, studying composition with John Anthony Lennon and David Van Vactor and conducting with Donald Neuen, and at Middle Tennessee State University, studying composition with Paul Osterfield and conducting with Carol Nies. His additional conducting study includes private instruction with Karen Lynne Deal and workshops with Kenneth Schermerhorn, John Morris Russell, and Diane Wittry. Sartor has served on the music faculties of Belmont University, Middle Tennessee State University, Cumberland University, and Trevecca Nazarene University, teaching Applied Composition, Music Theory, Form and Analysis, Music History, and General Music courses.

== Musical Philosophy ==
"Composition is an act of faith. While most composers strive for artistic excellence in their work, music also serves to communicate. Without willing players and attentive audiences, any composition is merely a complex set of instructions. Every piece of music, whether new or historical, is a testament to its composer's faith in the partnership among composer, performers, and audience."

(From Mr. Sartor's web site. Used by permission.)

== Major Compositions ==
UNACCOMPANIED SOLO

Sixes and Sevens, for solo cello

Medieval Manifesto, for solo contrabass

Variants, for solo trombone

ORGAN

Prelude on William Billings' "When Jesus Wept"

Simple Blessing

Open Door

SOLO WITH KEYBOARD ACCOMPANIMENT

Sonata for trumpet and piano

Celebration, for trumpet and organ

Remembrance, for flute and piano

Meditation, for cello and piano

TRIOS

Thrice-Told Tales of the Pomegranate Forest, for trumpet, violin, and bass clarinet

Scarab, for flute, bassoon, and harp

Prologue, fanfare for three trumpets

QUARTETS

Black Ball Counts Double, for string quartet

Passages, for string quartet

Diplomatic Solution, for cello quartet

Diplomatic Summit, for contrabass quartet

Diplomatic Immunity, for two violas and two cellos

Fanfare a4, for two trumpets and two trombones

QUINTETS

Aspirations, for woodwind quintet

Affectations, for brass quintet

Polygon, for brass quintet

BRASS ENSEMBLE / BRASS WITH PERCUSSION

Cat's Eye, for brass ensemble

Ascension, for brass and timpani

Parabola, for brass and timpani

Dies Irae, for brass and timpani

Crimson, for brass, timpani, percussion and optional organ

The Saints of Sewanee, for brass, timpani, percussion and optional organ

PERCUSSION ENSEMBLE

Illusions

VOCAL

Thy Light Is Come, for mixed choir, SATB, and organ, with optional brass and timpani

We Will Be Glad, for mixed choir, SATB, organ, brass, and timpani

Psalm 67, for mixed choir, SATB, organ, and trumpet

Welcome, Christmas Day! for mixed choir, SATB, and percussion (or piano)

Crown Him! for mixed choir, SATB, and orchestra (with optional organ)

Search Your Heart for Christmas, for mixed choir, SATB, and cello

Amid the Cruel Winter's Snow, for mixed choir, SATB, and harp

The Fog, for unaccompanied baritone

BAND / WIND ENSEMBLE

Vision

Synergistic Parable

Governor's Cup March

Veni Emmanuel: Fantasy of Abstractions

STRING ORCHESTRA

Reveries

Black Ball Counts Double

FULL ORCHESTRA

Metamorphic Fanfare

Portent and Apotheosis (aka Concerto for Orchestra)

O Worship the King
