= Clifton Williams (composer) =

American composer (1923–1976)

- Born: James Clifton Williams, Jr. March 26, 1923; Traskwood, Arkansas, US
- Died: February 12, 1976 (aged 52) Miami, Florida, US
- Genre: Symphonic music
- Occupation: Composer
- Instruments: Piano, French horn, mellophone

James Clifton Williams, Jr. (26 March 1923 Traskwood, Arkansas — 12 February 1976 Miami, Florida) was an American composer, pianist, French hornist, mellophonist, music theorist, conductor, and teacher. Williams was known by symphony patrons as a virtuoso French hornist with the symphony orchestras of Baton Rouge, New Orleans, Houston, Oklahoma City, Austin, and San Antonio. The young composer was honored with performances of Peace, A Tone Poem and A Southwestern Overture by the Houston and Oklahoma City symphony orchestras, respectively. He remains widely known as one of America's accomplished composers for the wind ensemble and band repertory.

== Education ==
Williams began playing French horn, piano, and mellophone in his childhood and played in the band at Little Rock High School. His senior class of 600 voted him as most outstanding in artistry, talent, and versatility.

Williams graduated from Louisiana State University (B.M., 1947), where he was a pupil of Helen L. Gunderson. He then attended the Eastman School of Music (M.M., 1949), where he studied with Bernard Rogers and Howard Hanson. It was Hanson who counseled Williams to write for wind band rather than the orchestra, advising him that he would get larger audiences, and a larger range of organizations to perform his music, by doing so.

During his post-war studies at Louisiana State University, Williams joined the fraternity Phi Mu Alpha Sinfonia, the largest and oldest musical fraternity in America. Later he would honor the fraternity with a symphonic concert march, The Sinfonians, that remains a staple of the concert band repertory today.

== Life and career highlights ==
Following the Japanese attack on Pearl Harbor in 1941, Williams left school after completing his first year at Louisiana Tech University to enlist in the United States Army Air Corps for the duration of World War II. He attended the Army Music School and then served in the 679th Army Air Corps (AAC) band at Louisiana's Selman Field and the 619th AAC band at Houston's Ellington AFB, even while composing in his spare time. A sympathetic officer recognized and encouraged Williams's diverse musical talents, including arranging and composing, and the onetime private ultimately left the service with the rank of staff sergeant. In 1947, having returned to civilian life and his musical studies, he married Maxine Holmes Friar of Beaumont, Texas.

On completing his studies in 1949, Clifton Williams joined the composition department of the School of Music at the University of Texas at Austin. He taught there until, in 1966, he was appointed Chair of the Theory and Composition Department at University of Miami School of Music. Williams retained this position until his death from cancer in 1976. His composition students included W. Francis McBeth, Lawrence Weiner, Robert Sheldon, Kenneth Fuchs, Ron Miller, Robert X. Rodriguez, E. Anne Schwerdtfeger, Thomas Wells, Gordon Richard Goodwin, and John Barnes Chance. He was a close colleague of fellow composer Alfred Reed while the two worked at the University of Miami, their offices being only steps apart in the music building at UM.

== Prizes, commissions, and publications ==
Williams' early compositions were for orchestra, but he would later achieve his greatest success writing for concert band. One of his earliest works, Fanfare and Allegro, was completed in 1954 but was considered, at the time, exceptionally difficult by the bands (including some military bands) that attempted to perform it. In particular, a military band struggled mightily with the work at a performance at the 1954 Brownsville, Texas Music Festival. Thus, Williams laid the work aside for some time.

The American Bandmasters Association then announced its first Ostwald Composition Prize in the winter of 1955. Williams slightly revised Fanfare and Allegro and entered it into this contest. Fanfare and Allegro won the inaugural American Bandmasters Association's Ostwald Award for original band literature in 1956. The first performance of the revised work, at the 1956 ABA convention, won rave reviews and the work moved rapidly to the forefront of serious wind literature.

Williams won the award again in 1957 for his Symphonic Suite. Williams entered the competition for a third time in 1958 with an earlier work, his Symphonic Essays of 1953, but withdrew from the competition the day before the winner was to be announced, feeling that winning a new competition a third consecutive time would discourage other equally worthy composers. It was not revealed until several years later that Symphonic Essays was, in fact, set to be the winner of the 1958 ABA prize.

The Minnie Stevens Piper Foundation commissioned Williams to compose a work celebrating the 25th anniversary of the San Antonio Symphony Orchestra (circa its 1964–1965 season). He composed a set of five symphonic dances, of which he would later transcribe two for concert band: Nr. 2, "The Maskers", and Nr. 3, "Fiesta". His protégé W. Francis McBeth, in 2000, recast the first dance ("Comanche Ritual") for band; the parts for it remain in manuscript in the possession of Williams' daughter, Michelle Williams Hanzlik. Dances 4 and 5 ("Square Dance" and "New Generation") also have been adapted for band, so that since 2007 a few performances of the entire set of five dances have been given.

The primary publishers of Williams's wind music have included Southern Music, Summy Birchard, Piedmont, C. L. Barnhouse, and University of Miami Music Publications. As of 2011, ten more of his band compositions have been published by Maestro & Fox Music by arrangement with the composer's estate. These previously unknown works include Dramatic Variations, Sonata Allegro, Show Tune, Caprice Americana, Postwar Prelude, Louisiana Tech Band's March, Roll of Honor March, "Symphonic Essays", Hall of Fame March, Ballade, "Pandean Fable", and The Hero March.

More first-time publications were slated for the 2010s, some four decades after the composer's death. The New Jersey City University's Symphony of Winds and Percussion revived Williams's unpublished Symphonic Essays in the spring of 2013.

Clifton Williams considered The Ramparts his favorite work. Commissioned by the United States Air Force Academy, the work contains an a cappella hymn, "What Greater Thing", that has become the unofficial alma mater song and has been performed at every USAFA commencement ceremony since 1965. Williams's wife, Maxine, wore a charm bracelet adorned with six charms, each one representing a significant band work by her husband; the charm for The Ramparts made up the central piece.

== Compositions ==
The following is a partial list of Clifton Williams's band compositions. Works marked with an asterisk are unpublished.

- Academic Processional (1960)
- Air Force Band of the West (1964)
- Arioso (1958)
- Ballade (1944)
- Band of the Hour (1968)*
- Border Festival (1966)
- Caccia and Chorale (1976)
- Cadets on Parade (1965)
- Caprice Americana (1944)
- Castle Gap (1964)
- Concertino for Percussion and Band (1958)
- Dedicatory Overture (1964)
- Dramatic Essay (1958)
- Dramatic Variations (1975)
- Fanfare and Allegro (1954, rev 1956)
- Festival (1961)
- Future Music Leaders of America March (1974)
- Hall of Fame March (1940)
- Henderson Festival (1967)
- Hermitage (1975)
- Hero March, The (1938)
- Hill Country Ballad (1956)
- Killian (1968)
- Laredo (1963)
- Louisiana Tech Band March, The (1940)
- Lyric Psalm (1957)*
- March Lamar (1964)
- Pandean Fable (1965)
- Pastorale (1958)
- Patriots (1970)
- Postwar Prelude (1943)
- Ramparts (1965)
- Regal Procession (1957)
- Roll of Honor March (1939)
- Show Tune (1944)
- The Sinfonians (1960)
- Solemn Fugue (1960)
- Sonata Allegro (1949)
- Songs of Heritage (1975, completed by W. Francis McBeth in 1978 at the request of the composer's widow)
- Strategic Air Command March (1965)
- Symphonic Dances (1963–1965; Nrs. 2 and 3 published)

Nr. 1: "Comanche Ritual"
Nr. 2: "Military Ball: The Maskers"
Nr. 3: "Fiesta"
Nr. 4: "Square Dance"
Nr. 5: "New Generation"

- Symphonic Essays (1953)
- Symphonic Suite (1957)

I: Intrada
II: Chorale
III: March
IV: Antique Dance
V: Jubilee

- Texas Bands (1969)*
- Toccata (1953)*
- Trail Scenes (1968)

I: Round Up
II: Nighthawk
III. Railhead

- Tribute to Barney Chance (ms, 1973)*
- Trilogy for Band (1964)

I: Declamation
II: Elegy
III: Quickstep March

- Variation Overture (1962)
