= Caesar Giovannini =

American pianist, arranger and composer

Caesar Giovannini (February 26, 1925 – September 23, 2017) was an American pianist, band arranger and composer.

Born in Chicago Illinois, Giovannini began piano studies at the age of five. He attended the Alfred Nobel Grammar School in Chicago and the Lane Technical High School. He graduated from the Chicago Conservatory of Music in 1948 with a Bachelor of Music and a master's degree in composition. While serving in the Navy, he was appointed in the US Navy Band in Washington, DC. From 1949 to 1956 he joined NBC in Chicago and gained fame through appearances on the Dave Garroway and Ransom Sherman shows. During 1956 and 1957 he was music director for the Kukla, Fran and Ollie television show. In 1958 he joined ABC Chicago. His instrumental compositions for Concert Band include Alla Barocco, El Torero, Overture in B-Flat, Overture to a New Era, and Chorale and Capriccio (with orchestrations by Wayne Robinson).

From 1961 to 1976, he played piano on many movie soundtracks including The World of Henry Orient (1964), Wait Until Dark (1967), The Fox (1967), The Shoes of the Fisherman (1968), Shaft's Big Score (1972) and Raid on Entebbe (1976).

== Discography ==
- Silk, Satin and Strings (Concertapes, Inc) 1957
- Holiday on the Riviera (Argo) 1959
- Caesar Plays (Concertapes, Inc) 1961
- The Brilliant Sound of Pianos and Percussion (Mercury) 1961
- The Magic Fingers of Caesar Giovannini (Mercury)
- Stella By Starlight (Mercury) 1974

With Pete Rugolo

- The Original Music of Thriller (Time, 1961)
