= David Van Vactor =

American composer

- Born: May 8, 1906; Plymouth, Indiana, United States
- Died: March 24, 1994 (aged 87); Los Angeles, California, United States
- Education: Northwestern University
- Occupations: composer, conductor
- Notable work: Symphony in D; seven symphonies; nine concertos

David Van Vactor (May 8, 1906 – March 24, 1994) was an American composer of contemporary classical music.

He was born in Plymouth, Indiana, and received Bachelor of Music (1928) and Master of Music (1935) degrees from Northwestern University. He studied with Arne Oldberg, Mark Wessel, Ernst Nolte (composer), Leo Sowerby, Paul Dukas, Franz Schmidt, and Arnold Schoenberg.

He was the assistant conductor of the Chicago Civic Orchestra (1933–34) and was both the flute section leader and assistant conductor of the Kansas City Philharmonic Orchestra from 1943 to 1947. He served as the conductor of the Knoxville Symphony Orchestra from 1947 until 1972. He also appeared as guest conductor with the New York Philharmonic-Symphony Orchestra, the Cleveland Orchestra, the Chicago Symphony Orchestra, the London Philharmonic Orchestra, the Frankfurt Radio Symphony, and the orchestras of Rio de Janeiro and Santiago, Chile.

He composed well over one hundred major works, including seven symphonies, nine concertos, five large pieces for chorus and orchestra, many orchestral, chamber and vocal works, and four pieces for symphonic band. In 1938 his Symphony in D won the Second Annual Competition of the New York Philharmonic-Symphony Society for a major symphonic work by a U. S. composer (his former teacher Mark Wessel received the sole Honorable Mention in the same competition). The Symphony was premiered on January 19, 1939, by the Philharmonic-Symphony, conducted by the composer. His music was recorded by the conductor William Strickland.

He was Professor of Composition and Flute at the University of Tennessee, Knoxville. His notable students include the "Van Vactor Five": Gilbert Trythall, Richard Trythall, David P. Sartor, Jesse Ayers, and Doug Davis. He was named Composer Laureate of the State of Tennessee by the Tennessee State Legislature and was succeeded in that position by another of his composition students, Michael Kurek in 2022. See: List of music students by teacher: T to Z#David Van Vactor. He died in Los Angeles, California, in 1994.

The David Van Vactor Collection is held by the University of Tennessee Special Collections Library in Knoxville, Tennessee.

== Discography ==
- 1958 – Fantasia, Chaconne, and Allegro. (With N. V. Bentzon, Pezzi sinfonici, op.109, and Walter Piston, Serenata). Louisville Orchestra, Robert Whitney, cond. Louisville LP, LOU-58-6.
- 1969 – The Music of David Van Vactor (Everest)
- 1970 – Concerto a quattro; Concerto for Viola and Orchestra. Willy Schmidt, Werner Peschke, Karl Hermann Seyfried, flutes; Charlotte Cassedanne-Haase, harp; Hans Eurich, viola; Hessischer Rundfunk Sinfonieorchester, David Van Vactor, cond. Orion LP ORS 7024
- 1976 – American Music for Flute and Piano (includes Van Vactor's Sonatina for Flute and Piano), Keith Bryan, flute; Karen Keys, piano. Orion LP, ORS 76242.
- 1995 – The Music of David Van Vactor. Symphony No. 1; Symphony No. 3; Recitativo and Saltarello, for orchestra; Sinfonia Breve. Frankfurt Radio Symphony Orchestra (Symphony No. 1); Hessischer Rundfunk Sinfonieorchester, David Van Vactor, cond. CRI CD 702. Material originally released on LPs, by CRI SD 169 (1963) and SD 225 (1968), and by Orion ORS 6910 (1969)
- 2006 – Episodes—Jesus Christ. The Knoxville Choral Society and Orchestra, J. B. Lyle, cond. CD Baby 103615.
