= John Mackey (composer) =

American composer (born 1973)

- Born: October 1, 1973 (age 53); New Philadelphia, Ohio
- Occupation: Composer
- Website: johnmackey.com

John Mackey (born October 1, 1973) is an American composer of contemporary classical music, with an emphasis on music for wind band, as well as orchestra. For several years, he focused on music for modern dance and ballet.

== Biography ==
John Mackey was born in New Philadelphia, Ohio and grew up in Westerville, Ohio, where he attended Westerville South High School. Though musicians themselves, Mackey's parents did not provide him with music lessons, and he never formally studied an instrument. His grandfather, however, taught him to read music and introduced him to digital music notation. Through experimentation with programs intended for entertainment rather than education, Mackey began to compose his own music. He wrote his first piece, Lacrimosa, at age 11, after being inspired by the film Amadeus. As a young composer, he took some lessons from one of his mother's friends, who had a Ph.D. in music.

Mackey received a Bachelor of Fine Arts degree in 1995 from the Cleveland Institute of Music, where he studied with Donald Erb. He then studied with John Corigliano at Juilliard, receiving a Master of Music degree in 1997. Mackey has stated his support for these institutions' policies of not requiring composers to perform an instrumental audition, as many composers, like himself, do not play an instrument. On this subject, Mackey has said, "There are obviously ways to compose music without playing a formal instrument."

Mackey lived in New York City from 1995 to 2005, where he collaborated frequently with choreographers such as David Parsons, Robert Battle, and Igal Perry. Mackey moved to Los Angeles in 2005. In April 2008, he announced on his blog his intention to move to Austin, Texas, explaining that much of his income is a result of commissions and other appearances in the Texas area. Then in March 2011, Mackey posted a blog to announce his move to Cambridge, Massachusetts in order for his wife to attend graduate school. In 2019, he moved with his wife to San Francisco, California, where he currently resides.

== Concert band ==
Mackey's first professional work was writing for dance companies. However, after attending the College Band Directors National Association conference in Minneapolis, he received a commission to reorchestrate his 2003

luctantly accepting, he completed the concert band version in 2005, and it became a great success. Today, most of his works from the past decade have been for concert band. He regularly receives commissions from high school bands, college bands, and professional wind ensembles in the United States and Asia.

== List of works ==
=== Orchestra ===
- Do Not Go Gentle Into That Good Night (1993)
- Concerto for Percussion and Orchestra (2000)
- Redline Tango (2003) (Note: Adaptation of Mackey's "Breakdown Tango".)
- Antiphonal Dances (2003)
- Under the Rug (2004)
- Harvest: Concerto for Trombone and Orchestra without Strings (2009)
- Aurora Awakes (2019) (Note: Transcription of concert band version. Transcription by the composer.)
- Songs from the End of the World (2019) (Note: Transcription of chamber ensemble version. Transcription by the composer.)

=== Wind ensemble/concert band ===
- Redline Tango (2005); (Note: Transcription of orchestra version. Transcription by the composer.) won the ABA Ostwald Award
- Sasparilla (2005)
- Turbine (2006)
- Strange Humors (2006) (Note: Transcription of string quartet version. Transcription by the composer.)
- Turning (2006)
- Kingfishers Catch Fire (2007)
- Concerto for Soprano Saxophone and Wind Ensemble (2007); a piano reduction is available as of 2013.
- Clocking (2007)
- Undertow (2008)
- Asphalt Cocktail (2009)
- Aurora Awakes (2009); won the ABA Ostwald Award and the NBA William D. Revelli Memorial Composition Contest
- Harvest: Concerto for Trombone and Orchestra without Strings (2009)
- Xerxes (2010)
- Hymn to a Blue Hour (2010)
- Foundry (2011)
- Drum Music: Concerto for Percussion and Wind Ensemble (2011)
- Sheltering Sky (2012)
- High Wire (2012)
- The Frozen Cathedral (2013)
- The Soul Has Many Motions (2013)
- Night on Fire (2013), movement II of "The Soul Has Many Motions" (available separately)
- Unquiet Spirits (2013), (Note: Transcription of saxophone quartet version. Transcription by the composer.) movement III of "The Soul Has Many Motions" (available separately)
- (Redacted) (2013)
- Wine-Dark Sea: Symphony for Band (2014)
- The Ringmaster's March (2014)
- Lightning Field (2015) (Note: An adaptation of "The attentions of souls", the third movement of Mackey's "Wine-Dark Sea: Symphony for Band".)
- Fanfare for Full Fathom Five (2015), for brass and percussion ensemble (and optional organ)
- Liminal (2016)
- This Cruel Moon (2017) (Note: An adaptation of "Immortal Thread, So Weak", the second movement of Mackey's "Wine-Dark Sea: Symphony for Band".)
- Antique Violences: Concerto for Trumpet and Wind Ensemble (2017)
- The Night Garden (2017)
- Snarl (2018)
- The Rumor of a Secret King (2018) (Note: Transcription of choir version. Transcription by the composer.)
- Until the Scars (2019) (Note: An adaptation of "Hubris", the first movement of Mackey's "Wine-Dark Sea: Symphony for Band".)
- Places we can no longer go (2019), for vocal soprano and wind ensemble; text by A. E. Jaques
- Sacred Spaces (2019)
- Some treasures are heavy with human tears (2021)
- Let Me Be Frank With You (2022)
- A deep reverberation fills with stars (2022)
- Divine Mischief: Concerto for Clarinet and Wind Ensemble (2022)
- Fission (2024)
- Haunted Objects (2024)
- Teeth of the Mechanism (2025 - Written for the James Fenimore Cooper Middle School's Symphonic Band)
- The isle is full of noises: Symphony No. 2 (2026)

=== Adaptable Ensemble ===
- This Cruel Moon – adaptable (2020), minimum 5-parts (SAATB)
- Strange Humors – adaptable (2020), minimum 4-parts (SATB) plus djembe
- Let Me Be Frank With You (2020), minimum 4-parts (SATB) plus drum set
- Sheltering Sky – adaptable (2020), minimum 4-parts (SATB)
- Night on Fire – adaptable (2021), minimum 4-parts (SATB) plus one percussionist

=== Choir ===
- Alleluia (1992), for 5-part choir (S1, S2, A, T, B)
- The Rumor of a Secret King (2017), for SATB choir; text by A. E. Jaques
- Cradle Song (2021), for SATB choir; text by A. E. Jaques

=== Chamber ensemble ===
- Elegy and Fantasie (1989, 1991), for violin and piano
- Tango (1991), for viola and two pianos
- Mom Song (1991), for flute, guitar, cello, and harpsichord
- Piano Trio in Two Movements (1992), for violin, cello, and piano
- The Other Side (1994), for double bass or cello and piano
- Mood Indigo (1996), for piano and drum set
- Strange Humors (1998), for string quartet and djembe
- Damn (1998), for amplified clarinet and four percussionists
- Voices and Echoes (1999), for string quartet
- Rush Hour (1999, revised 2000), for clarinet, electric string quartet, and drum set
- Breakdown Tango (2000), for clarinet, violin, cello, and piano
- Juba (2003), for electric string quartet and percussion
- Wrong-Mountain Stomp (2004), for violin, viola, and cello
- Mass (2004), for percussion ensemble
- Strange Humors (2008), for saxophone quartet and djembe
- Sultana (2009), for saxophone and piano
- Strange Humors (2012), for clarinet quartet and djembe
- Unquiet Spirits (2012), for saxophone quartet
- Hymn to a Blue Hour (2012), for trombone ensemble
- Songs from the End of the World (2015), (Note: Third movement, "At Sea", is a transcription of "Immortal Thread, So Weak", the second movement of Mackey's "Wine-Dark Sea: Symphony for Band". Transcription by the composer.) for vocal soprano and mixed chamber ensemble; (Note: Flute, Alto Flute, Oboe, English Horn, 2 Clarinets in Bb, 2 Bass Clarinets, Contrabass Clarinet, 2 Bassoons, Double Bass, Harp, Piano, 3 percussionists (marimba, vibraphone, bass drum, and suspended cymbal)) text by A. E. Jaques; a piano reduction is available as of 2017.
- Hymn to a Blue Hour (2021), for minimum 16-part ensemble (Note: Flute, Oboe, Bassoon, 2 Clarinets, Bass Clarinet, Optional Contrabass Clarinet, 2 Alto Saxes, Tenor Sax, Optional Baritone Sax, 2 Trumpets, horn, 2 Trombones, Euphonium, Tuba, and Optional Bass Drum)

=== Musical theater ===
- Score and songs for Shakespeare's Twelfth Night, Dallas Theater Center (2001)

== Bibliography ==
- Meet the Composer: John Mackey with UK Bands Meet the Composer: John Mackey with UK Bands UKNow (University of Kentucky)
- John Mackey: The Composer, His Compositional Style and a Conductor's Analysis of Redline Tango and Turbine Rebecca L Philips' doctoral dissertation
- JW Pepper long-form interview with John Mackey
