= American Bandmasters Association =

The American Bandmasters Association
- Abbreviation: ABA
- Formation: July 5, 1929
- Founder: Edwin Franko Goldman
- Type: Learned society
- Legal status: Society
- Purpose: Educational
- Region served: Worldwide
- Members: music education professionals
- Official language: English
- President: Bobby R. Francis
- Main organ: General Assembly
- Website: www.americanbandmasters.org

The American Bandmasters Association (ABA) was formed in 1929 by Edwin Franko Goldman to promote concert band music. Goldman sought to raise esteem for concert bands among musicians and audiences. The reputations of concert bands suffered in comparison to symphony orchestras due to factors including "the concert band’s concert venue, often out-of-doors, the difficulty of conductors to obtain a quality music education, a limited repertoire that with the exception of marches was largely borrowed from the libraries of the orchestra, and a lack of camaraderie among the leading bandmasters/conductors of the period."

The ABA's current Constitution states that the organization shall:

- honor outstanding achievement by invitation to membership;
- encourage prominent composers of all countries to write for the concert band;
- by example and leadership further enhance the concert band and its music within our cultural heritage.

Membership is extended to the leaders of the wind band movement and is considered to be the highest honor given within the wind studies realm. The current president is Michael J. Colburn. Previous presidents include Goldman, Karl King, Charles O'Neill, Herbert L. Clarke, Henry Fillmore, and William D. Revelli. John Philip Sousa was the first honorary life president. Membership is extended through invitation to conductors/teachers/directors considered to be exemplary professionals within the field. Associate Membership is available through invitation to "firms, organizations, and individuals engaged in the music industry or related field" who are closely affiliated with the ABA.

The association has contributed to the wind and percussion band community through the spheres of literature, performance, and pedagogy. The ABA is responsible for the commissioning of many of the wind band's most revered works, including Lincolnshire Posy by Percy Grainger, Pageant by Vincent Persichetti, Strange Humors by John Mackey, and Endurance by Timothy Mahr.

A list of the current and historical officers and membership can be found in the publication Lest We Forget, which is updated regularly.

The ABA sponsors the Sousa/Ostwald Award, which rewards compositions for bands. The organization also produces the Journal of Band Research.
