= Boston Crusaders Drum and Bugle Corps =

Junior drum and bugle corps based in Boston, Massachusetts

- Location: Boston, Massachusetts
- Division: World Class
- Founded: 1940; 86 years ago
- Director: Jack Kaplan
- Championship titles: CYO: 1964; 1966; 1967; DCI: 2025
- Website: inspirearts.org bostoncrusaders.org

The Boston Crusaders Drum and Bugle Corps is a competitive World Class drum and bugle corps. Based in Boston, Massachusetts, the Boston Crusaders are a charter member of Drum Corps International (DCI). They have won one DCI World Class Championship, winning the title for the first time in 2025.

== History ==
The Boston Crusaders were founded in 1940 as the Most Precious Blood Crusaders, a youth activity of the Most Precious Blood Catholic parish in the Hyde Park section of Boston. The Corps and the parish parted ways in 1956, and the corps took a new name, the Hyde Park Crusaders. During this period, two ardent, if unofficial supporters of the corps were two of the Kennedy brothers, John F. and Edward M. "Ted". Although John is often credited, Ted was responsible for acquiring West Point uniforms that the Crusaders converted to their own colors. The corps was honored by the newly elected President Kennedy by being invited to be the first drum and bugle corps to march in a Presidential Inauguration Parade. The corps' tight financial situation prevented their attendance in 1961, but the corps marched in President Lyndon B. Johnson's Inauguration Parade in 1964. JFK was formally made an honorary member of the corps only 34 days before his assassination.

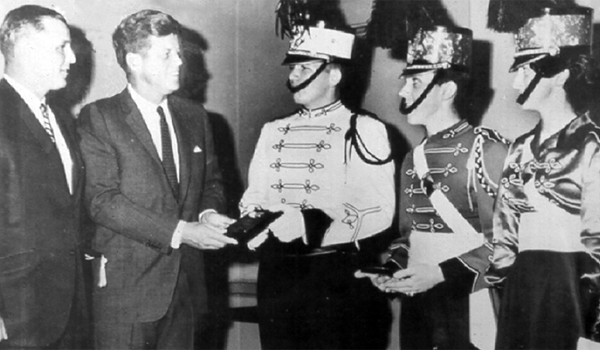
Drum majors of the Boston Crusaders make President John F. Kennedy an honorary member of their corps in 1963

By 1959, the corps had become the Boston Crusaders, although they often were (and still are) referred to as "BAC" or the Boston Area Crusaders, and BAC was one of the East Coast powerhouse corps of the 1960s. They won the first CYO National Drum and Bugle Championship in 1964 and repeated as CYO champions in 1966 & 1967. In 1966 and again in 1967 the Boston Crusaders were crowned World Open (class A) Champions. The corps was a finalist in National Championships from 1964 through 1971, placing second in the American Legion in 1966 & 1967, and second in the VFW in 1970.

In 1971, the Boston Crusaders, along with the 27th Lancers, Blessed Sacrament Golden Knights, Blue Rock, and Garfield Cadets formed the United Organization of Junior Corps (also known as the "Alliance"). This action was taken in reaction to the rigid, inflexible rules of the American Legion and VFW (the primary rule makers and sponsors of both corps and shows) and the low or nonexistent performance fees paid for appearing in the various competitions. The corps felt that not only were they having their creative potential as artistic performing groups stifled, but they were being financially starved. (A similar group of Midwestern corps, the Midwest Combine, was formed by the Blue Stars, Cavaliers, Madison Scouts, Santa Clara Vanguard, and the Troopers.) The Alliance members felt that the corps should be making their own rules, operating their own competitions and championships, and keeping the bulk of the monies those shows earned. For the 1971 season, the corps stuck together, offering show promoters the five corps as a package. Despite pressure on show sponsors, judges, and other drum corps, the corps were booked into a number of shows together.

In 1972, the Boston Crusaders, along with the nine other corps from the Alliance and the Midwest Combine, plus the Anaheim Kingsmen, Argonne Rebels, and De La Salle Oaklands were founding members of Drum Corps International, which remains as the sanctioning body for junior corps in North America. That summer, there was a fire in the corps hall that destroyed much of the corps' equipment. The corps was forced to withdraw from many of its scheduled contests, and at one point, could claim only nineteen active members. Rather than attending the first DCI World Championship in Whitewater, Wisconsin, BAC returned to the field to compete at CYO Nationals, where they finished ninth of thirteen corps and solidified their reputation as, "the corps that would not die."

Disaster struck again a decade later when, while on a 1982 tour in the United Kingdom, the corps' funds were embezzled, leaving members and staff stranded and financially insolvent in England. The Corps made it back home with the assistance of the US State Department for members under the age of 18, and all others paid their own way or received assistance from a handful of very generous supporters. The airline involved filed a receivership action, and several alumni stepped in to negotiate the release of title to the Corps' assets. Once more, the corps refused to die, fielding a small unit in 1983 as the Boston Drum and Bugle Corps. The instructional staff produced a first-class program, working tirelessly without compensation. During that year, the Corps marched in every parade possible within a day's drive of Boston, and repaid all of the Corps' debts, with the exception of the airline, which was never pursued. Three years later, the Corps resumed the use of the Boston Crusaders name.

Through the years, BAC had fostered a image of toughness. Prior to DCI Prelims in Miami in 1983, a gang of street thugs was harassing corps as they prepared to enter the Miami Orange Bowl. The Boston Crusaders, "...as adept with fists as with bugles..." solved the problem by chasing the gang away. However, this attitude was not conducive to attracting sufficient numbers of talented members to be a truly competitive corps, and in combination with a reputation for being troublemakers, the corps was relegated to middling rankings within DCI through the 1980s and '90's.

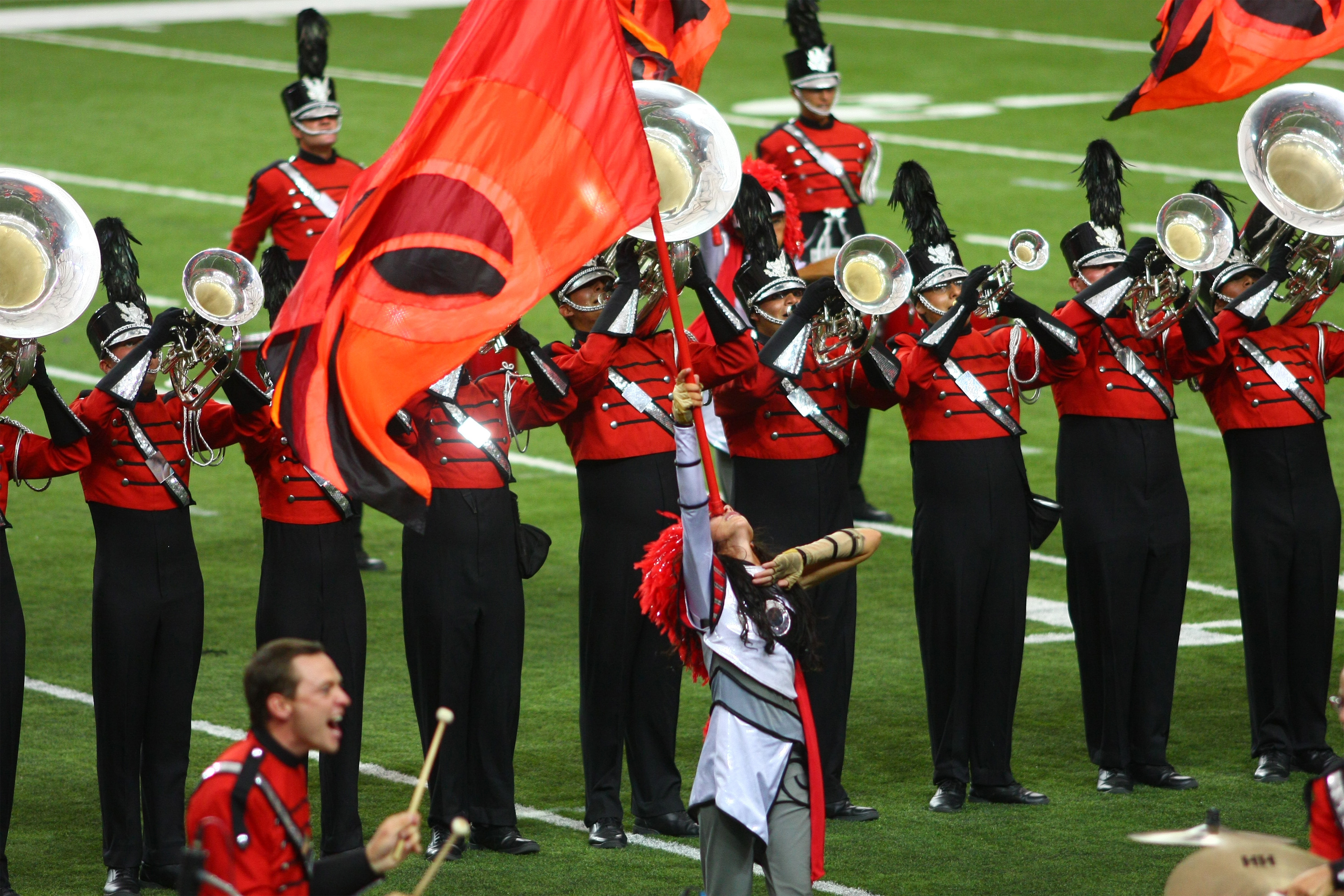
Traditional Boston Crusaders uniform, 2008

Under corps director Jim Cronin from 1996 to 2000, the corps adopted a new philosophy of "professionalism, accountability, and responsibility" for its members. In 1999, the Boston Crusaders finally earned a place among DCI's Top Twelve Finalists. They have returned to Finals in every year since, placing as high as fifth in 2000 & 2002 & 2018. In 2022 the corps had its best ever showing finishing in a 2nd place tie.

Historically, the Boston Crusaders have often been drum corps innovators. They were the first corps to march double tenor drums in 1967; the first to march tympani in 1968 (as the Majestic Knights of nearby Charlestown also did); the first with slides on their horns to allow playing a chromatic scale; and, although they were penalized for it in every show, the first to use a synthesizer in 1985.

On January 21, 2013, the corps marched in President Barack Obama's second inauguration parade.

The Boston Crusaders experienced one of its most competitive and successful seasons in the summer of 2018. The corps finished in 5th place at the 2018 Drum Corps International World Championships, with the color guard winning the George Zingali caption award for Best Guard--- the first time the Boston corps had ever won a caption at the world championships. This was followed in 2019 by a 6th place finish, despite an improved score, and a second successive Zingali Award. In 2022, Boston received their third Zingali and finished 2nd place tying with the Bluecoats Drum and Bugle Corps. After winning another silver medal in 2024, Boston finally won their first DCI World Championship in 2025, also winning their first Fred Sanford Award for Best Percussion and their first Jim Ott Award for Best Brass, and again earning the George Zingali Award for Best Color Guard.

== Alumni corps ==
The Crusaders Senior Drum and Bugle Corps of Boston was founded in 1991 as the alumni corps of the Boston Crusaders. It was founded by twin brothers Neil and Terry Connolly, both alumni of the Boston Crusaders. The first Senior Crusader performance took place in 1992, at the Patriots' Day Parade in Medford, Massachusetts.

The first home for the “Saders” (now officially renamed the Crusaders Senior Drum and Bugle Corps of Boston) was at the City Hall in Waltham, Massachusetts, though, over the years, the corps has had numerous practice facilities in the greater Boston area. The corps now calls the Lt. Norman Prince VFW Post (also known as Prince Palace) in Melrose, Massachusetts its home.

== Show summary (1972–2026) ==
Key
Pale green background indicates DCI World Class Semifinalist (Note: From 1973-1991, the Boston Crusaders competed in Open Class; from 1992-2007 in Division I, and since 2008 in World Class. These are the same tier, just renamed.)
Pale blue background indicates DCI World Class Finalist
Dark gold background indicates DCI World Class Champion

Year	Repertoire	World Championships	
Year	Repertoire	Score	Placement
1972	Opening Scene (from Boris Godunov) by Modest Mussorgsky / Yankee Doodle by Richard Shuckburgh / Zorba the Greek by Mikis Theodorakis / Beginnings by Robert Lamm / Make Me Smile by James Pankow / Persian Market by Albert Ketèlbey	Did not attend World Championships	
1973	El Capitan by John Philip Sousa / Yankee Doodle by Richard Shuckburgh / Man of La Mancha by Mitch Leigh & Joe Darion / War March & Battle Hymn of the Vikings by Alfred Reed / Cast a Giant Shadow by Elmer Bernstein / Hava Nagila (Traditional) / Meat And Metal Shoes / California Dreamin' by John Phillips & Michelle Phillips / Conquest (from Captain from Castile) by Alfred Newman	51.85	39th Place; Open Class
1974	Oklahoma Crude by Henry Mancini / Pop Goes the Weasel (Traditional) / Tubular Bells by Mike Oldfield / Hatikvah (Israeli National Anthem) by Naftali Herz Imber & Shmuel Cohen / Theme from The Man by Jerry Goldsmith / "California Dreamin'" by John Phillips & Michelle Phillips / Conquest (from Captain from Castile) by Alfred Newman	62.60	37th Place; Open Class
1975	Lohengrin by Richard Wagner / Tubular Bells by Mike Oldfield / Cast a Giant Shadow by Elmer Bernstein / Sader Stomp / Captain from Castile by Alfred Newman / Eberhard / Love's Theme by Aaron Schroeder / Conquest (from Captain from Castile) by Alfred Newman	67.20	27th Place; Open Class
1976	Coronation March by Pyotr Ilyich Tchaikovsky / Love's Theme by Aaron Schroeder / Simple Song & Kyrie (from Mass) by Leonard Bernstein / Hatikvah (Israeli National Anthem) by Naftali Herz Imber & Shmuel Cohen / Hava Nagila (Traditional) / Sabre Dance by Aram Khachaturian / When Will I See You Again by Kenny Gamble & Leon Huff / Conquest (from Captain from Castile) by Alfred Newman	75.20	20th Place; Open Class
1977	Symphony No. 5 by Dmitri Shostakovich / Coronation March by Pyotr Ilyich Tchaikovsky / Samba de Haps by Mark Taylor / Spanish Fantasy by Chick Corea / Hava Nagila (Traditional) / Conquest (from Captain from Castile) by Alfred Newman	81.15	17th Place; Open Class
1978	Finale (from Symphony No. 5) & Festive Overture by Dmitri Shostakovich / Hatikvah (Israeli National Anthem) by Naftali Herz Imber & Shmuel Cohen / Hava Nagila (Traditional) / Spanish Fantasy by Chick Corea / Threshold by Patrick Williams / Conquest (from Captain from Castile) by Alfred Newman	78.50	15th Place; Open Class
1979	Coronation of Boris Gudonov by Modest Mussorgsky / Symphony No. 9 (Ode to Joy) by Ludwig van Beethoven / Threshold by Patrick Williams / Birdland by Josef Zawinul / Fantasy by Maurice White, Verdine White & Eddie del Barrio / Time for a Change by Hank Levy / Conquest (from Captain from Castile) by Alfred Newman	74.75	19th Place; Open Class
1980	Aristophanic Suite (The Wasps) by Ralph Vaughan Williams / Kid Charlemagne by Walter Becker & Donald Fagen / And on the Sixth Day by Patrick Williams / Symphony No. 9 (Ode to Joy) by Ludwig van Beethoven / Time for a Change by Hank Levy / Conquest (from Captain from Castile) by Alfred Newman	63.90	25th Place; Open Class
1981	Coronation of Boris Gudonov by Modest Mussorgsky / Best Coast by John LaBarbera / Flamenco by Chick Corea / Wacky Dust by Oscar Levant & Stanley Adams / And on the Sixth Day, Threshold & Lady Beside Me by Patrick Williams / Conquest (from Captain from Castile) by Alfred Newman	66.55	25th Place; Open Class
1982	Samson and Delilah by Camille Saint-Saëns / Threshold by Patrick Williams / Kitty's Back by Bruce Springsteen / Spain by Chick Corea / While My Guitar Gently Weeps by George Harrison / Conquest (from Captain from Castile) by Alfred Newman	65.30	26th Place; Open Class
1983	Mexicali Nose by Harry Betts / Billie Jean by Michael Jackson / Symphony No. 9 (Ode to Joy) by Ludwig van Beethoven / Conquest (from Captain from Castile) by Alfred Newman	63.75	21st Place; Open Class; Semifinalist
1984	Mexicali Nose by Harry Betts / The Rainmaker by Earl Klugh / Moments in Japan / "California Dreamin'" by John Phillips & Michelle Phillips / Conquest (from Captain from Castile) by Alfred Newman	76.20	19th Place; Open Class; Semifinalist
1985	Symphony No. 2 by Howard Hanson / Turquoise / Exception to the Rule / Axel F (from Beverly Hills Cops) by Harold Faltermeyer / The Rainmaker by Earl Klugh / "California Dreamin'" by John Phillips & Michelle Phillips / Conquest (from Captain from Castile) by Alfred Newman	74.40	20th Place; Open Class; Semifinalist
1986	Symphony No. 5 by Dmitri Shostakovich / Coronation March by Pyotr Ilyich Tchaikovsky / Smooth Operator by Sade & Ray St. John / Bluesette by Toots Thielemans / Conga by Enrique García / Conquest (from Captain from Castile) by Alfred Newman	79.90	16th Place; Open Class; Semifinalist
1987	Music for Wind and Percussion by Elliot del Borgo / Havalah / Hava Nagila (Traditional) / "Unsquare Dance" by Dave Brubeck / Hello Again by Chick Corea / Conquest (from Captain from Castile) by Alfred Newman	82.80	14th Place; Open Class; Semifinalist
1988	Music for Wind and Percussion by Elliot del Borgo / At the End of the Day, Attack on Rue Plumet, One Day More & Do You Hear the People Sing? (all from Les Misérables) by Claude-Michel Schönberg, Alain Boublil, Jean-Marc Natel & Herbert Kretzmer / Conquest (from Captain from Castile) by Alfred Newman	77.60	20th Place; Open Class; Semifinalist
1989	Man of La Mancha by Mitch Leigh & Joe Darion / A Whiter Shade of Pale by Gary Brooker, Keith Reid & Matthew Fisher / Conquest (from Captain from Castile) by Alfred Newman	78.80	17th Place; Open Class; Semifinalist
1990	Coronation of Boris Gudonov by Modest Mussorgsky / Conquest (from Captain from Castile) by Alfred Newman	84.05	15th Place; Open Class; Semifinalist
1991	Selections from Rocky; War (from Rocky IV), Conquest & Vigil (from Rocky II), & Training Montage (from Rocky IV); All by Bill Conti	81.00	16th Place; Open Class; Semifinalist
1992	Pictures at an Exhibition; Promenade, Hut of Baba-Yaga, Tuileries, Ballet of the Unhatched Chicks, The Old Castle, Market Place at Limoges & The Great Gate of Kiev; All from Pictures at an Exhibition by Modest Mussorgsky	82.20	14th Place; Division I Semifinalist
1993	Compositions by Nikolai Rimsky-Korsakov; Russian Easter Overture, Scheherazade: The Prince and the Princess & Scheherazade: Festival in Baghdad; All by Nikolai Rimsky-Korsakov	82.40	14th Place; Division I Semifinalist
1994	Russian Cameos; Russian Easter Overture by Nikolai Rimsky-Korsakov / Troika & Romance (from Lieutenant Kijé Suite) by Sergei Prokofiev / Russian Sailor's Dance (from The Red Poppy) by Reinhold Glière	82.60	13th Place; Division I Semifinalist
1995	Pat Metheny Music; Are We There Yet? by Lyle Mays / Beat 70 by Pat Metheny & Lyle Mays / Cathedral in a Suitcase by Pat Metheny / The First Circle by Pat Metheny & Lyle Mays	74.40	16th Place; Division I Semifinalist
1996	Portraits of Our Homeland: The East; God Save the Queen (Traditional) / America the Beautiful by Samuel A. Ward & Katharine Lee Bates / Festival Overture on the Star Spangled Banner by Dudley Buck / Grover's Corner (from Our Town) by Aaron Copland / Children's Dance (from Merry Mount) by Howard Hanson / Times Square (from On the Town) by Leonard Bernstein	74.70	17th Place; Division I Semifinalist
1997	Portraits of Our Homeland: Conflicts & Resolution; Original Fanfare by Michael Klesch & Thom Hannum / Chester Overture by William Howard Schuman / Lincoln Portrait by Aaron Copland / Eternal Father by Johan Lindegren / Navy Hymn by John Bacchus Dykes / Victory at Sea by Richard Rodgers	80.50	15th Place; Division I Semifinalist
1998	Seascapes: From the Big Screen; The Sea Hawk by Erich Wolfgang Korngold / Captain from Castile & Conquest (from Captain from Castile) by Alfred Newman	81.20	15th Place; Division I Semifinalist
1999	A Collection of Symphonic Dances; Armenian Dances by Alfred Reed / Allegro Risoluto & Vivace (from English Dances) & Allegretto (from Four Scottish Dances) by Malcolm Arnold / Prelude (from La Fiesta Mexicana) by H. Owen Reed / Symphonic Dance No. 3 – Fiesta by Clifton Williams	88.60	9th Place; Division I Finalist
2000	RED; Bolero by Maurice Ravel / Intensity by Marty McCartt / Time To Say Goodbye by Francesco Sartori & Lucio Quarantotto / Day Danse by Chick Corea / Symphonic Dance No. 3 – Fiesta by Clifton Williams	92.35	5th Place; Division I Finalist
2001	Harmonium; Wild Nights (from Harmonium) by John Adams / Marimba Spiritual by Minoru Miki / Brothers & Gabriel's Oboe (from The Mission) by Ennio Morricone / Dance of the New World & Shakata: Singing the World into Existence by Dana Wilson / Original Music by Marty McCartt & Rich Viano	88.80	9th Place; Division I Finalist
2002	You Are My Star; Introduction to Appalachian Spring by Aaron Copland / The American President by Marc Shaiman / Allegro (from Appalachian Spring) by Aaron Copland / America / Clarinet Concerto by Artie Shaw / You Are My Star by Robert Seeley / Simple Gifts (from Appalachian Spring) by Aaron Copland	92.40	5th Place; Division I Finalist (tie) (Note: In 2002, the Boston Crusaders and Phantom Regiment tied for 5th place.)
2003	BRAVO! Bolero by Maurice Ravel / Danzas de Pasión by Jay Kennedy, Rich Viano & Jerry Carpenter / La Oración (The Prayer) by Carole Bayer Sager & David Foster / Spanish Fantasy by Chick Corea / Malagueña by Ernesto Lecuona	90.95	6th Place; Division I Finalist
2004	The Composition of Color; Introduction, Colored Rhythms, Colored Harmonies, Colored Dynamics, Colored Combinations & Closing; All original music by the staff of the Boston Crusaders	90.525	9th Place; Division I Finalist
2005	Ode to Joy; Jesu, Joy of Man's Desiring by Johann Sebastian Bach / Overture to Candide by Leonard Bernstein / The Promise of Living (from The Tender Land) by Aaron Copland / Sing Sang Sung by Gordon Goodwin / Symphony No. 9 (Ode to Joy) by Ludwig van Beethoven	88.40	9th Place; Division I Finalist
2006	Cathedrals of the Mind blue cathedral & Concerto for Orchestra by Jennifer Higdon / The Windmills of Your Mind (from The Thomas Crown Affair) by Michel Legrand / Original Music by Jay Kennedy, Rich Viano & Jerry Carpenter	87.325	10th Place; Division I Finalist
2007	A Picasso Suite; In Pace by Patrick Doyle / Cruzados by Jay Kennedy, Rich Viano & Jerry Carpenter / Oblivion by Astor Piazzolla / La Fiesta by Chick Corea	89.10	9th Place; Division I Finalist
2008	Neocosmos; Also Sprach Zarathustra by Richard Strauss / Kingfishers Catch Fire by John Mackey / Moondance by Van Morrison / August Rhapsody (from August Rush) by Mark Mancina / Burly Brawl (from The Matrix) by Don Davis & Juno Reactor	87.275	10th Place; World Class; Finalist
2009	The Core of Temptation; Bacchanale (from Samson and Delilah) by Camille Saint-Saëns / Salome by Richard Strauss / Belkis, Regina di Saba by Ottorino Respighi / Dance of the Maenads (from View from Olympus) by John Psathas / Myst by Steve Zuckerman / Oceana by Osvaldo Golijov	90.70	7th Place; World Class; Finalist
2010	Thy Kingdom Come; Throne Procession and Fanfare by Jay Kennedy / Symphony No. 10, Mvt. 2 by Dmitri Shostakovich / Power Shift by Jay Kennedy / Planet Damnation by John Psathas / Rhapsody on a Theme of Paganini (Variation 18) by Sergei Rachmaninoff / The Quest for Glory by Jay Kennedy	89.35	9th Place; World Class; Finalist
2011	Revolution; Do You Hear the People Sing, I Dreamed a Dream, The Attack on Rue Plumet, On My Own, Bring Him Home, & One Day More (all from Les Misérables) by Claude-Michel Schönberg, Alain Boublil, Jean-Marc Natel & Herbert Kretzmer / 1812 Overture by Pyotr Ilyich Tchaikovsky	90.65	8th Place; World Class; Finalist
2012	The Titans; The Pines of Rome & Roman Festivals by Ottorino Respighi / Symphony No. 10 by Dmitri Shostakovich / Evey Reborn (from V for Vendetta) by Dario Marianelli / War Dance (from Belkis, Regina di Saba) by Ottorino Respighi / Symphony No. 1 (Titan) by Gustav Mahler	89.10	7th Place; World Class; Finalist
2013	Rise; Sit Down, Stand Up by Thom Yorke / Water Night by Eric Whitacre / Falling Slowly (from Once) by Glen Hansard & Markéta Irglová / Lean on Me by Bill Withers / Test Drive (from How to Train Your Dragon) by John Powell / Time (from Inception) by Hans Zimmer / Original Music by Ryan George	90.40	8th Place; World Class; Finalist
2014	Animal Farm; The Battle on the Ice (from Alexander Nevsky) by Sergei Prokofiev / Polyuska Polye (O Field, My Field) & Symphony No. 4 in D Minor by Lev Knipper / Symphony No. 11, Mvt. 2 by Dmitri Shostakovich / Concert Românesc, Mvt. 4 by György Ligeti / Concerto for Violin and Orchestra by Samuel Barber / Original Music by Ryan George	88.950	10th Place; World Class; Finalist
2015	Conquest; Game of Thrones Theme by Ramin Djawadi / Conquest (from Captain from Castile) by Alfred Newman / Palladio by Karl Jenkins / Take What is Ours (from Assassin's Creed IV: Black Flag) by Brian Tyler / Five Variants of Dives and Lazarus by Ralph Vaughan Williams / The Battle (from Gladiator) by Hans Zimmer / Original Music by Ryan George & Ellis Hampton	86.800	10th Place; World Class; Finalist
2016	Quixotic "The Impossible Dream (The Quest)", Man of La Mancha (I, Don Quixote) & Dulcinea (all from Man of La Mancha) by Mitch Leigh & Joe Darion / Asturias (Leyenda) from Suite España, Op. 47 by Isaac Albéniz / Kiriki Film (from Iris) by Danny Elfman / Quixotic by Ryan George, Ellis Hampton & Marty O'Donnell	84.800	12th Place; World Class; Finalist
2017	Wicked Games; Moonlight Sonata by Ludwig van Beethoven / The Adoration of Veles and Ala (from Scythian Suite) by Sergei Prokofiev / Whispers by Colin McNutt, Iain Moyer & Michael Zellers / Cortege Macabre (from Grohg) by Aaron Copland / Wicked Game by Chris Isaak / Toccata (from Piano Concerto No. 1) by Alberto Ginastera / The Verdict by Ryan George, Colin McNutt & Iain Moyer	92.963	6th Place; World Class; Finalist
2018	S.O.S. Salvation Is Created by Pavel Chesnokov / A Breathless Alleluia by Philip Wilby / Marimba Spiritual by Minoru Miki / Sensemaya by Silvestre Revueltas / Extinguished by Ryan George, Colin McNutt, Iain Moyer & Michael Zellers / End Credits (from Cast Away) by Alan Silvestri / Amazing Grace by John Newton, adapted by William Walker	94.3125	5th Place; World Class; Finalist
2019	Goliath; Enough of Our Machines by Ryan Lott (Son Lux) / Everybody Wants to Rule the World by Roland Orzabal, Ian Stanley & Chris Hughes (Tears for Fears) / On the Shoulders of Giants by Peter Graham / Giant Steps by John Coltrane / My Shot (from Hamilton) by Lin-Manuel Miranda / Fanfare for Rocky by Bill Conti / Once Upon a Castle by Michael Daugherty	94.488	6th Place; World Class; Finalist
2020	Season cancelled due to the COVID-19 pandemic		
2021	Zoom; Lights Out by Ryan George, Colin McNutt & Iain Moyer / The Green Hornet by Billy May / Mercury (from The Planets) by Gustav Holst / With or Without You by Bono, The Edge, Adam Clayton & Larry Mullen Jr. (U2) / The Distance by Gregory P. Brown / Short Ride in a Fast Machine by John Adams	No scored competitions	
2022	Paradise Lost; A Child’s Garden of Dreams by David Maslanka / What a Wonderful World by Bob Thiele & George Weiss / Bad Hombres (y mujeres) by Antonio Sanchez / Can’t Take My Eyes Off You by Bob Crewe & Bob Gaudio / Symphony No. 7, Mvt. 3 by David Maslanka / Requiem in D Minor, K. 626: VII. Lacrimosa by Wolfgang Amadeus Mozart	97.325	2nd Place; World Class; Finalist (tie) (Note: In 2022, the Boston Crusaders and the Bluecoats tied for 2nd place.)
2023	White Whale; Fantasia on a Theme by Thomas Tallis, arranged by Ralph Vaughan Williams / Out to Sea by Ryan George, Colin McNutt, Iain Moyer & Mike Zellers / The Whale by Colin McNutt, Iain Moyer & Mike Zellers / Swallowtail Jig (Traditional) / The Wellerman (Traditional) / Show Me the Way to Go Home by Jimmy Campbell & Reg Connelly / Shipping Up To Boston by Dropkick Murphys / On the Waterfront by Leonard Bernstein	96.925	4th Place; World Class; Finalist
2024	Glitch; Shaker Loops by John Adams / G-Spot Tornado by Frank Zappa / Orchestral Suite #2 by Johann Sebastian Bach / Take Five by Paul Desmond / True Colors by Tom Kelly and Billy Steinberg / State of Independence by Evangelos Odysseas Papathanassiou and Jon Anderson / Worm Hole by Ryan George, Colin McNutt, Iain Moyer & Mike Zellers	97.413	2nd Place; World Class; Finalist
2025	BOOM; The Kingdom by Tigran Hamasyan / Red, White, and Black Worlds by Tigran Hamasyan / Whatchamacallit by Juan García Esquivel / Malambo No. 1 by Yma Sumac / The Commuter by Les Baxter / Shooting Star by Les Baxter / Once Upon Another Time by Sara Bareilles / No Time For Caution by Hans Zimmer / Now, Then, and Beyond by Ryan George, Colin McNutt, Iain Moyer, & Mike Zellers	98.425	1st Place; World Class; Champion
2026	Blurred Lines; Original Music / Outro by M83	95.675	4th Place; World Class; Finalist

== Caption awards ==
At the annual World Championship Finals, Drum Corps International (DCI) presents awards to the corps with the highest average scores from prelims, semifinals, and finals in five captions. The Boston Crusaders have won these caption awards:

George Zingali Best Color Guard Award

- 2018, 2019, 2022, 2024, 2025

Jim Ott Best Brass Award

- 2025

Fred Sanford Best Percussion Award

- 2025

== Traditions ==
=== "Conquest" ===
The Boston Crusaders first performed Alfred Newman's "Conquest" from the 1947 swashbuckling motion picture, Captain from Castile, in 1969 and repeated it in 1970. The corps brought the tune back in 1973 and 1974, then performed it as a part of their show every year from 1976 through 1990. Since then, "Conquest" had become a signature piece for the Crusaders.

=== Waldo ===
The Boston Crusader's symbol is King Richard's split-tailed lion. Affectionately known as "Waldo", the lion can be seen on all of the corps' vehicles, on the corps members' jackets, on corps merchandise, and as tattoos on many members and alumni of the Crusaders.

=== "Giant" ===
The Crusaders' corps song "Giant" is based on the main theme from the 1956 movie, Giant.
