= Drum Corps International World Class Champions =

2002 Drum Corps International finals awards ceremony at Camp Randall Stadium in Madison, Wisconsin. The DCI member corps line up on the field as The Commadant's Own drum corps performs from the stands.

At the end of the summer season, Drum Corps International (DCI) World Class corps compete to earn the title of DCI World Class Champion (formerly DCI Division I World Champion). The championships consist of three rounds—Preliminaries, Semifinals, and Finals—held on the first or second Thursday, Friday, and Saturday of August. Through 2010, all active World Class corps (21 corps as of 2024) competed in the Quarterfinals, with the top 17 advancing to the Semifinals. The top 12 corps from Semifinals then advanced to the Finals. Since the 2011 season, all active DCI corps (Open and World Class) have been permitted to compete for the championship. In this format, about 40 corps compete in Preliminaries, while the top 25 advances to Semifinals, with the top-scoring 12 advances to Finals. The champion is determined by the overall high score in the Finals competition. Due to the COVID-19 pandemic in 2020, the DCI World Championship and tour were cancelled. In 2021, to mark the return of drum corps, there were no scores given during the season, and the season concluded with a three-day celebratory event at Lucas Oil Stadium consisting of exhibition performances.

Only 11 corps have ever won the title (including 3 ties):

- Blue Devils – 21 titles (2 ties - 1996, 1999)
- The Cadets – 10 titles (1 tie - 2000)
- The Cavaliers – 7 titles (1 tie - 2000)
- Santa Clara Vanguard – 7 titles (1 tie - 1999)
- Bluecoats – 3 titles
- Madison Scouts – 2 titles
- Phantom Regiment – 2 titles (1 tie - 1996)
- Anaheim Kingsmen – 1 title
- Boston Crusaders – 1 title
- Carolina Crown – 1 title
- Star of Indiana – 1 title

The Anaheim Kingsmen, Star of Indiana, and The Cadets are no longer active.

Year	Champion & Repertoire	Score
2026	Bluecoats (Canton, Ohio): Gravity and Grace; Familiarity; The Wheel Has Come Full Circle; Don't Look Down; Ritual Being; fullmoon; God Only Knows; Inhale Exhale; Hot Saturn; I've Seen All Good People	99.100
2025	Boston Crusaders (Boston, Massachusetts): BOOM; The Kingdom; Red, White, and Black Worlds; Whatchamacallit; Malambo No 1; The Commuter; Shooting Star; Once Upon Another Time; No Time For Caution; Now, Then, and Beyond	98.425
2024	Bluecoats (Canton, Ohio): Change is Everything; Change is Everything; Foreplay/Long Time; The Four Sections; Agape; Love/Lover/Friend; Threshold; Dymaxion; Lost It to Trying	98.750
2023	Blue Devils (Concord, California): The Cut-Outs; The Rise; Caves; Jojo's Bizarre Adventure; Stardust Crusaders “Jotaro's Theme"; Resistance; Both Sides Now; Of Energy; Incident in Jazz; Grand Canyon Fanfare	98.975
2022	Blue Devils (Concord, California): Tempus Blue; Lapis Lazuli; Divine Blue; Carnival of Venice; Moon River; Hands And Feet; Silk Sonic Intro; Tank!; Home Of The Brave	98.750
2021	No scored competitions	
2020	Season cancelled due to the COVID-19 pandemic	
2019	Blue Devils (Concord, California): Ghostlight; Discombobulate; Don't Think; Rhythm Song; A True Passion; Stroke of Genius; Symphony No. 3; Ghostlight; Circus	98.325
2018	Santa Clara Vanguard (Santa Clara, California): Babylon; My Body is a Cage; Journey to the Center of the Earth; Metropolis 1927; Apology; Club Sound	98.625
2017	Blue Devils (Concord, California): Metamorph; Birth of Eternity; Dreamscape; Facing Future; The Triumph of Time; Flight of the Bumblebee; Everything Must Change; Crystal	98.538
2016	Bluecoats (Canton, Ohio): Down Side Up; Jose/beFORe JOHN5; Heat of the Day; Raga Raja; Udacrep Akubrad; The Great Gig in the Sky; Down Slide Up; Todo Tiende	97.650
2015	Blue Devils (Concord, California): Ink; Dark Forest; Sweeney Todd; The Giant Attack; The Mad Hatter's Tea Party; I Like You; Children Will Listen; Last Midnight	97.650
2014	Blue Devils (Concord, California): Felliniesque; Act 1 - Fellini's Religion; Old Toys; La Strada; Act 2 - Fellini's Circus; The Clowns; Circo Compagnia; Act 3 - Fellini's Fantasy; Be Italian; Movie Studio	99.650
2013	Carolina Crown (Fort Mill, South Carolina): e=mc^{2}; Einstein on the Beach; Also Sprach Zarathustra; Walking With Heroes; The Devil's Bridge; The Abyss; The Light Fantastic; The Dark Side of the Moon	98.300
2012	Blue Devils (Concord, California): Cabaret Voltaire; Harmonielehre; Morrison Mania; Children's Hour of Dream; Symphonies: V; Bird and Bela in B Flat; Gymnopedies Amazon; Ballet Mecanique; Peppy and George (from The Artist); Dr. Bones; New Arrival (from Corpse Bride); Tevot; Rhapsody in Blue	98.700
2011	The Cadets (Allentown, Pennsylvania): Between Angels and Demons; Angels in the Architecture; 160 BPM (from Angels and Demons); Doxology/Amazing Grace; Finale	98.350
2010	Blue Devils (Concord, California): Through a Glass, Darkly; City of Glass Suite; Conflict; Mirage; Trajectories; Incident in Jazz; Laura; La Suerte De Los Tontos	98.900
2009	Blue Devils (Concord, California): 1930; Get Happy; Happy Days Are Here Again; Playing Love; Piano Variations; Rialto Ripples; I Got Rhythm; Piano Concerto in F; Caravan; Rhapsody in Blue	99.050
2008	Phantom Regiment (Rockford, Illinois): Spartacus; Ein Heldenleben; Selections from Spartacus; Toccata from Piano Concerto No.1; Dance of Ecstasy; Battlefield from KÀ (Cirque du Soleil)	98.125
2007	Blue Devils (Concord, California): Winged Victory; Pegasus Fantasy; Ascension; Heaven	98.000
2006	The Cavaliers (Rosemont, Illinois): Machine; Genesis; Wired; Premonition; The Machine Age	97.200
2005	The Cadets (Allentown, Pennsylvania): The Zone: Dreamscapes in Four Parts with a Door; Twisted Nerve from Kill Bill; Liquid; Overture to a New World (from Dancer in the Dark); Cvalda (from Dancer in the Dark); Vertigo; False Mirrors	99.150
2004	The Cavaliers (Rosemont, Illinois): 007; Goldeneye; Welcome to Cuba (from Die Another Day); Hovercraft (from Die Another Day); For Your Eyes Only (from For Your Eyes Only); Live and Let Die (from Live and Let Die); Tomorrow Never Dies	98.700
2003	Blue Devils (Concord, California): The Phenomenon of Cool; Concierto de Aranjuez; Take Five; Blue Rondo A La Turk; Unsquare Dance	98.800
2002	The Cavaliers (Rosemont, Illinois): Frameworks; Melody; Harmony; Rhythm	99.150
2001	The Cavaliers (Rosemont, Illinois): Four Corners	98.350
2000	The Cadets (Bergen County, New Jersey): We Are the Future; Disney Millennium Celebration; The Cavaliers (Rosemont, Illinois): Niagara Falls; Niagara Falls; Richard Saucedo Original Composition	97.650
1999	Blue Devils (Concord, California): Rhythms...At the Edge of Time; Estancia Ballet (Rhythm 1 – Afrocuban/Malambo); Powerhouse: Rhumba for Orchestra (Rhythm 2 – Rhumba); Powerhouse: Rhumba for Orchestra (Rhythm 3 – Samba); Adios Nonino (Rhythm 4 – Tango); Unchained Melody (Rhythm 5 – Jazz); The Dirty Boogie (Rhythm 6 – Swing); Santa Clara Vanguard (Santa Clara, California): Inventions for a New Millennium: Music by Samuel Barber and Frank Ticheli; The Canyon; Symphony No. 2; Symphony No. 1; Blue Shades	98.400
1998	The Cadets (Bergen County, New Jersey): Jan Van der Roost's Stonehenge; Stonehenge; Canterbury Chorale	98.400
1997	Blue Devils (Concord, California): As Time Goes By...; Casablanca; Bangkok; A Night in Tunisia; As Time Goes By	98.400
1996	Blue Devils (Concord, California): Club Blue: A Gangster Chronicle; Children's Hour of Dream; Desi; Tess' Theme (from Dick Tracy); Trouble (from Mission Impossible); Phantom Regiment (Rockford, Illinois): A Defiant Heart: The Music of Dmitri Shostakovich; Fourth Ballet Suite; First Symphony, Second Movement; Fifth Symphony, Fourth Movement	97.400
1995	The Cavaliers (Rosemont, Illinois): The Planets; Mars; Venus; Mercury; Jupiter	98.300
1994	Blue Devils (Concord, California): My Spanish Heart; Spanish Fantasy Part I; Night Streets; Day Danse; My Spanish Heart; Spanish Fantasy Part 4	98.400
1993	The Cadets of Bergen County (Bergen County, New Jersey): In the Spring, At the Time When Kings Go Off to War; In the Spring, When Kings Go Off to War; Ballet Sacra; On a Hymnsong of Philip Bliss	97.400
1992	The Cavaliers (Rosemont, Illinois): Revolution and Triumph; Gavorkna Fanfare; Cornish Dances, 4th Movement; English Dances, 4th Movement; Peterloo Overture	97.500
1991	Star of Indiana (Bloomington, Indiana): Roman Images: The Music of Ottorino Respighi; Roman Festivals – Movement I; The Pines of Rome – Movement I; Roman Festivals – Movement II; Roman Festivals – Movement III; Roman Festivals – Movement IV	97.000
1990	The Cadets of Bergen County (Bergen County, New Jersey): A Bernstein Celebration; Overture to Candide; Mass; Somewhere (from West Side Story); Fancy Free Ballet	97.700
1989	Santa Clara Vanguard (Santa Clara, California): Phantom of The Opera; Angel of Music; Masquerade; Wishing You Were Somehow Here Again; Track Down this Murderer	98.800
1988	Madison Scouts (Madison, Wisconsin): Concerto For Guitar and Jazz Orchestra; Malagueña	97.100
1987	Garfield Cadets (Garfield, New Jersey): Appalachian Spring	97.900
1986	Blue Devils (Concord, California): Channel One Suite; Conquistador; Spanish Fantasy; Chick Corea Suite	98.400
1985	Garfield Cadets (Garfield, New Jersey): Jeremiah Symphony; Overture to Candide; Make Our Garden Grow (from Candide)	98.400
1984	Garfield Cadets (Garfield, New Jersey): Selections from West Side Story	98.000
1983	Garfield Cadets (Garfield, New Jersey): Rocky Point Holiday; Mass	94.400
1982	Blue Devils (Concord, California): T.O.; Pegasus; Paradox; One More Time Chuck Corea; People Alone (from The Competition)	95.250
1981	Santa Clara Vanguard (Santa Clara, California): Northridge; A Young Person's Guide to the Orchestra; Slava; Don't Cry For Me Argentina (from Evita)	94.000
1980	Blue Devils (Concord, California): New York Fantasy; Ya Gotta Try; Pegasus; Free; La Suerte de Los Tontos (from Cuban Fire Suite); Pauper in Paradise; Dindi	90.600
1979	Blue Devils (Concord, California): Chicago III Suite; La Suerte de Los Tontos (from Cuban Fire Suite); My Heart Belongs to Me	93.550
1978	Santa Clara Vanguard (Santa Clara, California): Overture to a New Era; Dance of Welcome (from Gayane Ballet); Adagio (from Gayne Ballet); Lezghinka (from Gayne Ballet); Gopak (from Gayne Ballet); If You Believe (from The Wiz); Bottle Dance (from Fiddler on the Roof)	91.550
1977	Blue Devils (Concord, California): Channel One Suite; Spanish Fantasy; Gonna Fly Now (from Rocky)	92.050
1976	Blue Devils (Concord, California): Channel One Suite; Legend of the One-Eyed Sailor; Chase the Clouds Away	92.700
1975	Madison Scouts (Madison, Wisconsin): Slaughter on 10th Avenue (from On Your Toes); MacArthur Park; Rhapsody in Blue; Dueling Banjos; The Way We Were	92.500
1974	Santa Clara Vanguard (Santa Clara, California): Siegfried's Rhine Journey (from Die Götterdammerung); A Young Person's Guide to the Orchestra; Overture to Candide; A Little Night Music; Weekend in the Country (from A Little Night Music); Send in the Clowns (from A Little Night Music)	89.500
1973	Santa Clara Vanguard (Santa Clara, California): Fanfare and Allegro; A Young Person's Guide to the Orchestra; Wedding Celebration & Bottle Dance (from Fiddler on the Roof); Chava Ballet (from Fiddler on the Roof)	88.650
1972	Anaheim Kingsmen (Anaheim, California): March from Folk Song Suite; When Johnny Comes Marching Home; Mickey Mouse Club March; Ritual Fire Dance (from El Amor Brujo); Sing Sing Sing; Exodus; King of Kings	88.100
