= Blue Devils Drum and Bugle Corps =

Junior drum and bugle corps based in Concord, California

The Blue Devils
- Location: Concord, California, United States
- Division: World Class
- Founded: 1957
- Director: Patrick Seidling
- Senior Executive Advisor: David Gibbs
- Chief Executive Officer: Jim Verrett
- Championship titles: CYO: 1976; 1978; 1980; DCI: 1976; 1977; 1979; 1980; 1982; 1986; 1994; 1996 (tie); 1997; 1999 (tie); 2003; 2007; 2009; 2010; 2012; 2014; 2015; 2017; 2019; 2022; 2023
- Website: www.bluedevils.org

The Blue Devils Drum and Bugle Corps is a competitive junior drum and bugle corps based in Concord, California. The Blue Devils are members of Drum Corps International and currently compete in the World Class division. They have finished in the top four at the DCI World Championships since 1992, and have placed no lower than fifth since 1975. They also hold the record for the highest score in DCI history, winning the 2014 DCI World Championships with a score of 99.65. The Blue Devils hold a record of twenty-one titles to date.

== History ==
In 1957, Tony and Ann Odello and the Concord VFW post assumed control of the Martinettes, a defunct drum corps and drill team. They reorganized the unit as the Blue Devils. Initially, the group performed as an all-boy drum corps with an all-girl drill team. In 1958, the Blue Devils added glockenspiels, becoming a drum and bell corps, while the girls became a separate baton twirling troupe, the Majorettes. The two units continued to perform together, winning numerous state and local competitions between 1957 and 1970. In 1961, the Blue Devils added a flag section to the unit that was then competing in the state's Junior division. In 1968, the drum and bell corps moved into Senior Division competition, and the new junior corps, Blue Devils B, was founded.

In 1970, a group of buglers was added to the Blue Devils drums and flags, and the corps entered its first competition as the Blue Devils Drum and Bugle Corps. By 1972, the unit, now with over seventy members, advanced from Class B competition to Class A and traveled on tour outside California for the first time. The summer of 1973 marked the Blue Devils first national tour and their first appearance at the Drum Corps International World Championships in Whitewater, Wisconsin. The younger Blue Devils C Drum and Bugle Corps was also formed in 1973. In 1976, the Blue Devils won the first of the corps' twenty-one DCI World Championship titles.

Over the years, the Devils have often made use of jazz and Latin music repertoires, notably Bill Reddie's Channel One Suite (made famous by Buddy Rich) and charts from the music of Chick Corea and Chuck Mangione and that written for Stan Kenton's big band. Since 1994, the percussion caption head has been Scott Johnson.

In 2014, the Blue Devils won their sixteenth DCI World Championship. At the DCI Finals in Indianapolis on August 9, the corps received a record high score of 99.650.

In the Blue Devils' 2017 program, voiceovers were used from a newly discovered audio tape recording of the late former director Jerry Seawright addressing the crowd at the Blue Devils' first appearance as a drum and bugle corps in 1972.

The Blue Devils Drumline was featured in the soundtrack of the 2013 animated film Monsters University. In 2020, the Drumline partnered with Extreme Music to release Bang To Rights, an album consisting of 16 distinct drumline grooves.

== Sponsorship ==
The Blue Devils Drum and Bugle Corps is sponsored by BD Performing Arts, a 501(c)(3) musical organization.

BD Performing Arts also sponsors the Blue Devils B, the Blue Devils C, the Blue Devils Open Class and A Class Winter Guards programs, the Diablo Wind Symphony, and BD Entertainment.

In 2015, BD Performing Arts added the Blue Devils International Corps, a 97-member unit made up of alumni of the Blue Devils and 8 other DCI World Class corps. The corps spent more than a month traveling and performing in the Netherlands, the United Kingdom, France, Italy, and Switzerland, concluding with 9 days and 15 performances of their show at the Basel Tattoo in Switzerland. A similar tour was planned for 2020, with stops in Germany, France, Italy, the Netherlands, and the Basel Tattoo in Switzerland, but was canceled due to the COVID-19 pandemic.

== Show summary (1972–2026) ==
Key
Pale blue background indicates DCI World Class Finalist (Note: From 1972-1991, the Blue Devils competed in Open Class; from 1992-2007 in Division I, and since 2008 in World Class. These are the same tier, just renamed.)
Dark gold background indicates DCI World Class Champion

Year	Repertoire	World Championships	
Year	Repertoire	Score	Placement
1972	Strike Up the Band (from Strike Up the Band) by George Gershwin & Ira Gershwin / Ave Maria by Franz Schubert / Venus by Robbie van Leeuwen / The Man I Love & I Got Rhythm (from Girl Crazy) by George Gershwin & Ira Gershwin / Day in the Life of a Fool by Luiz Bonfá & Antônio Maria, adapted by Carl Sigman	Did not attend World Championships	
1973	Chant and Jubilo by W. Francis McBeth / Jupiter (from The Planets) by Gustav Holst / Ave Maria by Franz Schubert / This Could Be the Start of Something Big by Steve Allen / Miserlou (Traditional), adapted by Nicholas Roubanis / Caravan by Juan Tizol / Morning of the Carnival by Luiz Bonfá & Antônio Maria	66.100	24th Place; Open Class
1974	Chant and Jubilo by W. Francis McBeth / Porgy and Bess by George Gershwin, DuBose Heyward & Ira Gershwin / Legend of the One-Eyed Sailor, Chase the Clouds Away & Feel of a Vision by Chuck Mangione / One Touch of Venus by Kurt Weill & Ogden Nash / Lady Sings the Blues by Billie Holiday & Herbie Nichols	79.150	9th Place; Open Class; Finalist
1975	Space Shuttle by John LaBarbera / Love's Been Gone So Long by Bruce Conte / What Is Hip by Emilio Castillo & Stephen Kupka / Squib Cakes by Chester Thompson / Legend of the One-Eyed Sailor, Feel of a Vision & Chase the Clouds Away by Chuck Mangione	88.600	3rd Place; Open Class; Finalist
1976	Channel One Suite by Bill Reddie / Legend of the One-Eyed Sailor & Chase the Clouds Away by Chuck Mangione	92.700	1st Place; Open Class; Champion
1977	Channel One Suite by Bill Reddie / Spanish Fantasy by Chick Corea / Gonna Fly Now (from Rocky) by Bill Conti	92.050	1st Place; Open Class; Champion
1978	Chicago III Suite (Canon by James Pankow; Mother by Robert Lamm; Once Upon a Time by James Pankow & Free by Robert Lamm), adapted by Stan Kenton / Spanish Fantasy by Chick Corea / Legend of the One-Eyed Sailor by Chuck Mangione	91.200	3rd Place; Open Class; Finalist
1979	Chicago III Suite (Canon by James Pankow; Mother by Robert Lamm; Once Upon a Time by James Pankow & Free by Robert Lamm), adapted by Stan Kenton / La Suerte de Los Tontos (from Cuban Fire Suite) by Johnny Richards / A Pauper in Paradise by Gino Vannelli / My Heart Belongs to Me by Alan Gordon	93.550	1st Place; Open Class; Champion
1980	New York Fantasy by Wayne Downey / Ya Gotta Try by Sammy Nestico / Pegasus by Hank Levy / Free by Robert Lamm / La Suerte de Los Tontos (from Cuban Fire Suite) by Johnny Richards / A Pauper in Paradise by Gino Vannelli / Dindi by Antônio Carlos Jobim & Aloísio de Oliveira, adapted by Ray Gilbert	90.600	1st Place; Open Class; Champion
1981	New York Fantasy by Wayne Downey / Ya Gotta Try by Sammy Nestico / La Danse du Bonheur by John McLaughlin & L. Shankar / One More Time Chuck Corea by Gene Puerling / Johnny One Note (from Babes in Arms) by Richard Rodgers & Lorenz Hart / Dindi by Antônio Carlos Jobim & Aloísio de Oliveira, adapted by Ray Gilbert	93.700	2nd Place; Open Class; Finalist
1982	T.O. by Rob McConnell / Pegasus by Hank Levy / Paradox by Kerry Livgren & Steve Walsh / One More Time Chuck Corea by Gene Puerling / People Alone (from The Competition) by Lalo Schifrin & Will Jennings	95.250	1st Place; Open Class; Champion
1983	T.O. by Rob McConnell / Everybody Loves the Blues by Maynard Ferguson & Nick Lane / Paradox by Kerry Livgren & Steve Walsh / One More Time Chuck Corea by Gene Puerling / A New Beginning by Wayne Downey	93.800	2nd Place; Open Class; Finalist
1984	Bacchanalia by Steve Spiegl / Latin Implosion by Hank Levy / Karn Evil 9 by Keith Emerson, Greg Lake & Peter Sinfield / La Fiesta by Chick Corea / Like a Lover by Dori Caymmi, Nelson Motta, Alan Bergman & Marilyn Bergman	97.900	2nd Place; Open Class; Finalist
1985	Liferaft Earth by Marius Nordal / Trilogy by Keith Emerson & Greg Lake / Karn Evil 9 by Keith Emerson, Greg Lake & Peter Sinfield / Piano Concerto No. 1 by Keith Emerson / First Circle by Pat Metheny & Lyle Mays	97.100	3rd Place; Open Class; Finalist
1986	Channel One Suite by Bill Reddie / Conquistador by Jay Chattaway & Maynard Ferguson / Spanish Fantasy & Chick Corea Suite by Chick Corea	98.400	1st Place; Open Class; Champion
1987	Spanish Dreams; Fanfare for the New by Hugo Montenegro / Harlem Nocturne by Earle Hagen & Dick Rogers / Echidna's Arf (Of You) by Frank Zappa / Free by James Pankow / Spanish Dreams by Phil Kelly	94.400	4th Place; Open Class; Finalist
1988	Happy Days Are Here Again by Milton Ager & Jack Yellen / That Old Black Magic by Harold Arlen & Johnny Mercer / Goodbye Yesterday by Don Piestrup / Since I Fell For You by Buddy Johnson	96.300	3rd Place; Open Class; Finalist
1989	Ya Gotta Try by Sammy Nestico / If We Were In Love (from Yes, Giorgio) by John Williams, Alan Bergman & Marilyn Bergman / Allegre by Claude Bolling / Johnny One Note (from Babes in Arms) by Richard Rodgers & Lorenz Hart	95.900	4th Place; Open Class; Finalist
1990	Selections from Tommy; Sparks, See Me Feel Me, Tommy Can You Hear Me, Pinball Wizard, Underture, Listening To You & Overture Finale; All from Tommy by Pete Townshend (The Who)	95.300	4th Place; Open Class; Finalist (Note: In 1990, the Blue Devils and Phantom Regiment tied for 4th place.)
1991	Conversations in Jazz; Commencement (from Adventures in Time) by Johnny Richards / Bird and Bela in B-Flat, Mvts. 2 & 3 by Don Sebesky	93.800	5th Place; Open Class; Finalist
1992	Big, Bad and Blue; Blue Light, Red Light (Someone's There) by Harry Connick Jr. & Ramsey McLean / El Congo Valiente, Fuego Cubano & La Suerte de Los Tontos (from Cuban Fire Suite) by Johnny Richards / "When a Man Loves a Woman" by Percy Sledge	95.400	4th Place; Division I Finalist
1993	A Don Ellis Portrait; Open Wide & Great Divide by Don Ellis / Chain Reaction by Hank Levy / Strawberry Soup & Niner-Two by Don Ellis	95.100	4th Place; Division I Finalist
1994	My Spanish Heart; Spanish Fantasy, Part 1; Night Streets; Day Danse; My Spanish Heart & Spanish Fantasy, Part 4 All from My Spanish Heart by Chick Corea	98.400	1st Place; Division I Champion
1995	Carpe Noctem; Buleria (from Jazz Pana) by Vince Mendoza / Conquistador by Jay Chattaway & Maynard Ferguson / Coronation of the Dead Queen, Mvt. 4 & Ines, Mvt. 2 (from The Legend of Alcobaca) by Jim Sochinski / No Heroes by Rick Tait / Commencement (from Adventures in Time) by Johnny Richards / Caribe (from One More Once) by Michel Camilo / Day Danse by Chick Corea / Dom Pedro's Revenge, Mvt. 5 (from The Legend of Alcobaca) by Jim Sochinski	96.700	3rd Place; Division I Finalist
1996	Club Blue: A Gangster Chronicle; The Children's Hour of Dream by Charles Mingus / Desi by Michael Daugherty / Tess' Theme (from Dick Tracy) & Trouble (from Mission: Impossible) by Danny Elfman	97.400	1st Place; Division I Champion (Note: In 1996, the Blue Devils and Phantom Regiment tied for 1st place.)
1997	As Time Goes By... Casablanca by Max Steiner / One Night In Bangkok by Benny Andersson, Björn Ulvaeus & Tim Rice / A Night in Tunisia by Dizzy Gillespie & Frank Paparelli / As Time Goes By by Herman Hupfeld	98.400	1st Place; Division I Champion
1998	One Hand, One Heart... Romeo and Juliet by Pyotr Ilyich Tchaikovsky / West Side Story by Leonard Bernstein & Stephen Sondheim	97.700	3rd Place; Division I Finalist
1999	Rhythms... At the Edge of Time; Rhythm 1 – Afrocuban/Malambo: Estancia by Alberto Ginastera; Rhythm 2 – Rhumba: Rhumba for Orchestra – Rhumba by Graeme Koehne; Rhythm 3 – Samba: Rhumba for Orchestra – Samba by Graeme Koehne; Rhythm 4 – Tango: Adios Nonino by Astor Piazolla; Rhythm 5 – Jazz: Unchained Melody by Graeme Koehne; Rhythm 6 – Swing: The Dirty Boogie by Brian Setzer	98.400	1st Place; Division I Champion (Note: In 1999, the Blue Devils and Santa Clara Vanguard tied for 1st place.)
2000	Methods of Madness; Prelude & Blues (from Taxi Driver: A Night Piece For Orchestra), Prelude (from On Dangerous Ground), Prelude (from Psycho), Scène d'Amour (from Vertigo) & The Wild Ride (from North by Northwest); All by Bernard Hermann	96.900	3rd Place; Division I Finalist
2001	Awayday Blue; Awayday by Adam Gorb / Fantasy Variations (on George Gershwin's Second Prelude for Piano) by Donald Grantham / Paganini Variations by Philip Wilby	97.600	2nd Place; Division I Finalist (Note: In 2001, the Blue Devils and the Cadets tied for 2nd place.)
2002	Jazz: Music Made in America; Ragtime, adapted by Randy Newman / I Got Rhythm (from Girl Crazy) & Fascinating Rhythm by George Gershwin & Ira Gershwin / House of the Rising Sun (Traditional) / Channel One Suite by Bill Reddie	97.300	2nd Place; Division I Finalist
2003	Phenomenon of Cool; Concierto de Aranjuez by Joaquin Rodrigo / Take Five by Paul Desmond / Blue Rondo à la Turk & "Unsquare Dance" by Dave Brubeck / Cool Fugue and Prologue (from West Side Story) by Leonard Bernstein	98.800	1st Place; Division I Champion
2004	The SummerTrain Blues MIX; The Ghost Train Triptych by Eric Whitacre / Summertime (from Porgy and Bess) by George Gershwin, DuBose Heyward & Ira Gershwin / Take the A Train by Billy Strayhorn / Calling the Indians Out by Wynton Marsalis	98.525	2nd Place; Division I Finalist
2005	Dance Derby of the Century; Redline Tango by John Mackey / Brother Can You Spare A Dime by Jay Gorney & E.Y. Harburg / Prelude Fugue and Riffs & On the Town by Leonard Bernstein / In Wartime by David Del Tredici	95.250	4th Place; Division I Finalist
2006	The Godfather, Part BLUE; Selections from The Godfather by Nino Rota & Carmine Coppola / Symphony No. 6 by Carl Vine / Two Symphonic Movements by Václav Nelhýbel / Symphony No. 1 by William Alwyn / La Doma (from Estancia) by Alberto Ginastera / La Strada by Nino Rota	96.550	3rd Place; Division I Finalist
2007	Winged Victory; Bird and Bela in B Flat, Mvt. 2 by Don Sebesky / Celebrare Celeberrime by Carl Vine / Introduction to Rite of Spring by Igor Stravinsky / Pegasus by Hank Levy / The Firebird Suite by Igor Stravinsky / The Kiss by Michael Torke	98.000	1st Place; Division I Champion
2008	Constantly Risking Absurdity; Main Theme from Sweeney Todd by Stephen Sondheim / Phrygian Gates by John Adams / Bach 2 Part Invention in D Minor by Johann Sebastian Bach, adapted by Gordon Goodwin / Serenada Schizophrana, Mvt. 1 by Danny Elfman / I Will Wait For You by Michel Legrand / The Untouchables by Ennio Morricone	98.100	2nd Place; World Class; Finalist
2009	1930; Get Happy by Harold Arlen & Ted Koehler / Happy Days Are Here Again by Milton Ager & Jack Yellen / Playing Love (from The Legend of 1900) by Ennio Morricone / Piano Variations by Aaron Copland / Rialto Ripples by George Gershwin / I Got Rhythm (from Girl Crazy) by George Gershwin & Ira Gershwin / The Strength of the Righteous (from The Untouchables) by Ennio Morricone / Piano Concerto in F by George Gershwin / Caravan by Juan Tizol / Rhapsody in Blue by George Gershwin	99.050	1st Place; World Class; Champion
2010	Through a Glass, Darkly; City of Glass Suite by Bob Graettinger / Conflict & Mirage by Pete Rugolo / Trajectories by Franklyn Marks / Incident In Jazz by Bob Graettinger / Laura by David Raksin & Johnny Mercer / La Suerte de los Tontos by Johnny Richards	98.900	1st Place; World Class; Champion
2011	The Beat My Heart Skipped; A House Is Not a Home, Summer of 77, Walk On By, One Less Bell To Answer, Woman, I Say A Little Prayer, Wives and Lovers & God Give Me Strength; All by Burt Bacharach	97.800	2nd Place; World Class; Finalist
2012	Cabaret Voltaire; Harmonielehre by John Adams / Main Title (from Apollo 13) by James Horner / The Children's Hour of Dream by Charles Mingus / Symphonies: V by Andre Souris / Bird and Bela in B Flat by Don Sebesky / Gymnopédies by Erik Satie / Ballet Mécanique by George Antheil / Peppy and George (from The Artist) by Ludovic Bource / Dr. Bones by Steve Perry / New Arrival by Danny Elfman / Tevot by Thomas Ades / Rhapsody in Blue by George Gershwin	98.700	1st Place; World Class; Champion
2013	The Re:Rite of Spring; The Rite of Spring by Igor Stravinsky / The Rite of Spring by Don Sebesky / The ReWrite of Spring by Darryl Brenzel	98.050	2nd Place; World Class; Finalist
2014	Felliniesque; Act 1 – Fellini's Religion: Old Toys (from Iris) by Danny Elfman / La Strada Theme by Nino Rota; Act 2 – Fellini's Circus: The Clowns by Nino Rota / Circo Compagnia by Gordon Goodwin; Act 3 – Fellini's Fantasy: Be Italian (from Nine) by Maury Yeston / Movie Studio (from Iris) by Danny Elfman	99.650 (Note: To date, this is the highest score received by any corps at DCI World Championships.)	1st Place; World Class; Champion
2015	Ink; Dark Forest by Dave Glyde / The Ballad of Sweeney Todd & The Giant Attack (from Into the Woods) by Stephen Sondheim / The Mad Hatter's Tea Party by Gordon Goodwin / I Like You by J.Y. Park (GOT7) / Children Will Listen & Last Midnight (from Into the Woods) by Stephen Sondheim	97.650	1st Place; World Class; Champion
2016	As Dreams Are Made On; Cape Fear (Prelude) by Bernard Herrmann / Stormy Weather by Harold Arlen & Ted Koehler / Ariel Attack by Gordon Goodwin / Where Are Ü Now by Sonny Moore, Thomas Wesley Pentz, Justin Bieber, Jason Boyd, Karl Rubin Brutus & Jordan Ware / Main Title (from The Impossible) by Fernando Velázquez / Prospero's Magic by Dave Glyde / Mishima by Philip Glass	97.250	2nd Place; World Class; Finalist
2017	Metamorph; Birth of Eternity, Dreamscape & Facing Future by Dave Glyde / The Triumph of Time by Peter Graham / Flight of the Bumblebee by Nikolai Rimsky-Korsakov / Everything Must Change by Benard Ighner / Diamonds by Rihanna / STAY. (from Interstellar) by Hans Zimmer / Who Knows One? (Traditional) / Crystal by Simon Dobson	98.538	1st Place; World Class; Champion
2018	Dreams and Nighthawks; Laura by David Raksin & Johnny Mercer / Harlem Nocturne by Earle Hagen & Dick Rogers / Smooth Criminal by Michael Jackson / Natural Woman by Gerry Goffin, Carole King & Jerry Wexler / Jacob's Bakery by James Newton Howard / City Noir by John Adams / Blade Hawks by Simon Dobson / Night Runner by Paul Lovatt-Cooper / Gotham City by Dave Glyde / Konakkol Duet by Vidwan B. R. Somasheker Jois & Kumari V. Shivapriya / Playing Love (from The Legend of 1900) by Ennio Morricone	97.350	2nd Place; World Class; Finalist
2019	Ghostlight; Discombobulate (from Sherlock Holmes) by Hans Zimmer / Don't Think by Slamb / Rhythm Song by Paul Smadbeck / Cycle Song by Imogen Heap / A True Passion & Stroke of Genius by Lorne Balfe / Symphony No. 3 by Aram Khachaturian / Ghostlight by Dave Glyde / Circus by Lukasz Sebastian Gottwald (aka Dr.Luke), Claude Kelly & Benjamin Joseph Levin (aka Benny Blanco)	98.325	1st Place; World Class; Champion
2020	Season canceled due to the COVID-19 pandemic		
2021	Other Worlds; Selections from 2017 to 2019 productions / Killing Me by Boris Brejcha (The Blue Devils did not perform live at DCI events in 2021)	No scored competitions	
2022	Tempus Blue; Lapis Lazuli & Divine Blue by Dave Glyde / Carnival Of Venice by Niccolo Paganini / Moon River by Henry Mancini, arranged by Jacob Collier / Hands and Feet by Michel Camilo / Silk Sonic Intro by Bruno Mars / Tank! by Yoko Kanno / Home of the Brave by Thomas Bergersen	98.750	1st Place; World Class; Champion
2023	THE CUT-OUTS; Proverb by Steve Reich / The Rise by Dave Glyde / Caves by Cody Fry / Jojo's Bizarre Adventure by Tominaga, Fujibayashi, Tanaka / Stardust Crusaders (Jotaro's Theme) by Yugo Kanno / Resistance by Dave Glyde / Both Sides Now by Joni Mitchell / Of Energy by TesseracT / Incident In Jazz by Bob Graettinger / Grand Canyon Fanfare by James Newton Howard	98.975	1st Place; World Class; Champion
2024	The Romantics; Romantics Whisper by Dave Glyde / And the Heavens Shall Tremble by Russell Brower and Matt Uelmen / Fable Legends (Title Theme) by Russell Shaw / Merry Go Round by Joe Hisaishi / Battle! (Trainer Battle) (from Pokémon Black and White) by Junichi Masuda & Go Ichinose / Shattered Pixel by Dave Glyde / Game Girl by Dave Glyde / Jungle Base (from Streets of Rage 2) by Yuzo Koshiro & Motohiro Kawashima / Time by Billy Porter / Distance by Dave Glyde / Can You Hear the Music by Ludwig Goransson / Poor Things (Finale) by Jerskin Fendrix	97.075	3rd Place; World Class; Finalist
2025	Variations on a Gathering; Uninvited by Alanis Morissette / Atoms & Molecules by Dave Glyde / Kashmir by John Bonham, Jimmy Page & Robert Plant / Little Wing by Jimi Hendrix / Blue Rondo á La Turk by Dave Brubeck / Quantum Energy Entanglement by Dave Glyde / Fuse by Nick Omiccioli / True Love by Hans Zimmer / BIRDS OF A FEATHER by Billie Eilish / Terraforming by Dave Glyde / Detach by Hans Zimmer	95.788	4th Place; World Class; Finalist
2026	ZEI; Mishima/Opening by Philip Glass / Turbine by John Mackey / I Just Had to Hear Your Voice by Allan Rich and Jud Friedman / Assembly by Dave Glyde / The Triumph of Time by Peter Graham / By Three They Come by Ryan Amon / Nevesk by Ted Reedy / Escape by Hans Zimmer and Richard Harvey / POSTERITY by Ludwig Göransson	97.500	2nd Place; World Class; Finalist

== Caption awards ==
At the annual World Championship Finals, Drum Corps International (DCI) presents awards to the corps with the high average scores from prelims, semifinals, and finals in five captions. The Blue Devils have won these caption awards:

Don Angelica Best General Effect Award/Formerly Known: High General Effect

- 1976, 1977, 1979, 1981, 1982, 1986, 1994, 2003, 2007, 2009, 2010, 2012, 2014, 2017, 2022, 2023

John Brazale Best Visual Performance Award/Formerly Known: High Visual

- 1976, 1978, 1982, 1986, 1994, 1995, 1996, 1997, 1999, 2001, 2003, 2007, 2008, 2009, 2010, 2012 (tie), 2014, 2015, 2017, 2019, 2022, 2023

George Zingali Best Color Guard Award/Formerly Known: High Color Guard

- 1979 (tie), 1982, 1984, 1986, 1990, 1992, 1995, 1997, 1998, 1999, 2001, 2003, 2006, 2008, 2009, 2010, 2011, 2012, 2013, 2014, 2015, 2023

Jim Ott Best Brass Performance Award/Formerly Known: High Brass

- 1976, 1977, 1979, 1980, 1981, 1982, 1984 (3-way tie), 1985 (tie), 1986, 1988, 1991 (tie), 1993 (tie), 1994, 1995 (3-way tie), 1997, 1998, 1999, 2001, 2003, 2004, 2007, 2008, 2010, 2014, 2022

Fred Sanford Best Percussion Performance Award/Formerly Known: High Percussion

- 1976, 1977, 1983, 1984, 1985, 1986, 1994, 1996, 1997, 2007, 2009, 2012, 2015

== Blue Devils B Drum and Bugle Corps ==
The Blue Devils "B" Drum and Bugle Corps
- Location: Concord, CA
- Division: Open Class
- Founded: 1968
- Director: Lainey Braatz
- Championship titles: VFW: 1982; DCI Open Class: 2009; 2010; 2011; 2014; 2016; 2026

The Blue Devils B Drum and Bugle Corps are an Open Class competitive junior drum and bugle corps based in Concord, California. The corps is a member of Drum Corps International and has grown from a feeder corps for the Blue Devils Drum and Bugle Corps to a full-fledged Drum Corps in its own right. The corps has won the DCI Open Class World Championship five times.

=== History ===
In 1968, the original Blue Devils corps moved up from B Class competition to A Class, and the Blue Devils B was started as a younger cadet corps. In 1973, the Blue Devils B converted from a drum and bell corps to a drum and bugle corps.

As a cadet corps, the unit performed for years almost exclusively on the West Coast. Only when the World Championships were held in Pasadena, California did the Blue Devils B become a regular competitor in the Division II & III (now Open Class) Championships. The Blue Devils B won the first of three consecutive Open Class World Championships in Indianapolis in 2009. In 2011, the corps also competed in World Class preliminaries, finishing in 19th place and earning membership in DCI.

On September 5, 2018, BD Performing Arts, Vanguard Music & Performing Arts, and Drum Corps International announced that the Blue Devils B had "decided to travel and compete only in California for the 2019 season" and that both the Blue Devils B and the Vanguard Cadets Drum and Bugle Corps would not attend DCI Open Class Championships in 2019.

In 2026, BD Performing Arts, announced that the Blue Devils B would be for performers aged 18 - 21.

=== Show summary (1977–2026) ===
Key
Light blue background indicates DCI Open Class Finalist (Note: From 1997–2007, Blue Devils B competed in Division II; and since 2008 in Open Class. These are the same tier, just renamed.)
Goldenrod background indicates DCI Open Class Champion
Pale green background indicates DCI World Class Semifinalist

Year	Repertoire	World Championships	
Year	Repertoire	Score	Placement
1977	Repertoires unavailable	39.050	19th Place; Class A
1978	Repertoires unavailable	41.010	14th Place; Class A
1979–80	Repertoires unavailable	Did not attend World Championships	
1981	Malaguena by Ernesto Lecuona / Ozark by Lyle Mays & Pat Metheny / Sphinx's Lair (Unknown) / Home (from The Wiz) by Charlie Smalls / Antioch Fantasy by Jim McFarland	Did not attend World Championships	
1982	Malaguena by Ernesto Lecuona / Samba de Haps by Mark Taylor	Did not attend World Championships	
1983–88	Repertoires unavailable	Did not attend World Championships	
1989	Suncats (Unknown) / Night Flight by Steve Robertson & Terry Shalberg	Did not attend World Championships	
1990	Flight of the Condor by Dave Grusin / Bossa Corona by Bill Wiedrich / San Juan by Claus Ogerman / Samba de Haps by Mark Taylor / Don't Let Me be Lonely Tonight by James Taylor	Did not attend World Championships	
1991	Flight of the Condor by Dave Grusin / Call on Me by Lee Loughnane / Jack Miraculous by Gino Vannelli / At Seventeen by Janis Ian / São Paulo by Antônio Maria, Benny Carter, David Benoit, Jay Hoggard & Kenny Dorham	84.300	4th Place; Class A60
1992	Payload (Unknown) / Night of the Capricorn Moon by Mike Vax / Bossa Corona by Bill Wiedrich	Did not attend World Championships	
1993	The Sorcerer by Herbie Hancock / Sunrise Lady by Bruce Johnstone / Late in the Evening by Paul Simon	Did not attend World Championships	
1994	Baroque Samba by Darmon Meader / Space Shuttle by John LaBarbera / Now or Never by Caprice Fox, Darmon Meader, Kim Nazarian, Peter DeRose, Peter Eldridge & Sara Krieger (New York Voices)	Did not attend World Championships	
1995	Selections from the Mambo Kings	Did not attend World Championships	
1996	From This Moment On (from Kiss Me Kate) by Cole Porter / City Gate by Chick Corea / The Rumble (from West Side Story) by Leonard Bernstein / You Can't Fall Up (You Just Fall Down) by Emilio Castillo, Skip Knape & Stephen "Doc" Kupka / Scott & Fran's Paso Doble (from Strictly Ballroom) by David Hirschfelder	Did not attend World Championships	
1997	Nutville by Horace Silver / Guaguancó by Arturo Sandoval / Night of the Capricorn Moon by Mike Vax / Minuano by Pat Metheny & Lyle Mays / Scott and Fran's Paso Doble (from Strictly Ballroom) by David Hirschfelder	86.000	4th Place; Division II; Finalist
1998	There's No Place Like Home; The Wiz Medley & Believe in Yourself (from The Wiz) by Charlie Smalls / On Dangerous Ground Medley by Bernard Herrmann / Witches' Themes (from the Wizard of Oz) by Herbert Stothart / Night on Bald Mountain by Modest Mussorgsky / Symphonie Fantastique by Hector Berlioz / Over the Rainbow (from The Wizard of Oz) by Harold Arlen & E.Y. Harburg / So You Want to See The Wizard, Home & Brand New day (from The Wiz) by Charlie Smalls	Did not attend World Championships	
1999	Something Old, Something New, Something Borrowed, Something Blue; Pontieo by Edu Lobo & José Carlos Capinam / Tom by Michael John LaChiusa / Baby Moon by Adam Guettel / Way Back to Paradise by Michael John LaChiusa / Dindi by Antônio Carlos Jobim & Aloysio de Oliveira, adapted by Ray Gilbert	Did not attend World Championships	
2000	Music of Chicago; Make Me Smile by James Pankow / 25 or 6 to 4 & Beginnings by Robert Lamm / Call on Me by Lee Loughnane	Did not attend World Championships	
2001	Dance Movements by Philip Sparke	Did not attend World Championships	
2002	Scootin' on Hardrock by David Holsinger	Did not attend World Championships	
2003	Chronometry: The Study of Time; The First Circle by Pat Metheny & Lyle Mays / Letter From Home by Pat Metheny / Kinetic by Colin Greenwood, Jonny Greenwood, Ed O'Brien, Phil Selway & Thom Yorke (Radiohead)	Did not attend World Championships	
2004	Blue Fusion: The Music of the New York Voices and Pat Metheney; Baroque Samba by Darmon Meader / The Sultan Fainted by Darmon Meader & Peter Eldridge / Third Wind by Lyle Mays & Pat Metheny / Letter From Home by Pat Metheny / Minuano by Lyle Mays & Pat Metheny	88.375	7th Place; Division II; Finalist
2005	3 Generations; Grandparents, Parents & Children; All by John Meehan	Did not attend World Championships	
2006	Chain Reactions; Fission by John Meehan, Vinnie Angelo & Mark Higgenbotham / Propagation & Mutual Excitation by John Meehan & Vinnie Angelo / Fusion by John Meehan, Vinnie Angelo & Mark Higgenbotham	89.350	6th Place; Division II; Finalist
2007	Trilogy; Trilogy, Jerusalem & C'est la Vie by Keith Emerson & Greg Lake / Piano Concerto No. 1 by Keith Emerson / Karn Evil 9 by Keith Emerson, Greg Lake & Peter Sinfield	90.875	4th Place; Division II; Finalist
2008	Flight; Flight by John Meehan & John Mackey / Turbine by John Mackey / Through the Night, Turbulence & Final Approach and Landing by John Meehan & John Mackey	96.775	2nd Place; Open Class; Finalist
2009	Pursuit... Original Music by John Meehan & John Mapes / Hide and Seek by Imogen Heap	95.500	1st Place; Open Class; Champion
2010	Space; Introduction and March & Battle: Planning the Attack; Return Fire & The Last Missile (from Interstellar Suite) by Amin Bhatia / Lux Arumque by Eric Whitacre / Aha! by Imogen Heap / Original Music by John Meehan	97.550	1st Place; Open Class; Champion
2011	Syncronicity; Synchronicity I by Sting / Kaleidoscope Heart by Sara Bareilles / Murder by Numbers by Sting / Krump by Scott McAllister / Synchronicity II by Sting / Original Music by John Meehan	95.000	1st Place; Open Class; Champion
2011	Syncronicity; Synchronicity I by Sting / Kaleidoscope Heart by Sara Bareilles / Murder by Numbers by Sting / Krump by Scott McAllister / Synchronicity II by Sting / Original Music by John Meehan	76.450	19th Place; World Class; Semifinalist
2012	Ecstatic Waters; Ecstatic Waters by Steven Bryant / Kingfishers Catch Fire by John Mackey / Over the Edge, Splashdown & River's End by John Meehan, Brian Dinkle & John Mapes	93.850	2nd Place; Open Class; Finalist
2012	Ecstatic Waters; Ecstatic Waters by Steven Bryant / Kingfishers Catch Fire by John Mackey / Over the Edge, Splashdown & River's End by John Meehan, Brian Dinkle & John Mapes	73.600	21st Place; World Class; Semifinalist
2013	Warped; Dom Pedro's Revenge (5th Mvt. of The Legend of Alcobaca) by Jim Sochinski / Bizarro by Michael Daugherty / Serenada Schizophrana by Danny Elfman / Original Music by John Meehan	95.700	2nd Place; Open Class; Finalist
2013	Warped; Dom Pedro's Revenge (5th Mvt. of The Legend of Alcobaca) by Jim Sochinski / Bizarro by Michael Daugherty / Serenada Schizophrana by Danny Elfman / Original Music by John Meehan	77.950	20th Place; World Class; Semifinalist
2014	Noir [nuvo] Young and Beautiful (from The Great Gatsby) by Lana Del Rey / Brute Force (from The Naked City) by Miklós Rózsa / Theme (from The Usual Suspects) by John Ottman / Children's Hour of Dreams by Charles Mingus / Asphalt Cocktail by John Mackey / Film Noir/Pursuit (from Iris) by Danny Elfman	82.650	1st Place; Open Class; Champion
2014	Noir [nuvo] Young and Beautiful (from The Great Gatsby) by Lana Del Rey / Brute Force (from The Naked City) by Miklós Rózsa / Theme (from The Usual Suspects) by John Ottman / Children's Hour of Dreams by Charles Mingus / Asphalt Cocktail by John Mackey / Film Noir/Pursuit (from Iris) by Danny Elfman	82.325	15th Place; World Class; Semifinalist
2015	Prismatic; Luminosity by James Whitbourn / The Analog Kid by Neil Peart, Alex Lifeson & Geddy Lee (Rush) / You Know Where to Find Me by Imogen Heap / I Am the Doctor (from Doctor Who) by Murray Gold	80.325	2nd Place; Open Class; Finalist
2015	Prismatic; Luminosity by James Whitbourn / The Analog Kid by Neil Peart, Alex Lifeson & Geddy Lee (Rush) / You Know Where to Find Me by Imogen Heap / I Am the Doctor (from Doctor Who) by Murray Gold	77.175	19th Place; World Class; Semifinalist
2016	To The Moon; Claire de Lune by Claude Debussy / Leonardo Dreams of His Flying Machine by Eric Whitacre / Space Race by John Meehan / Hostility: Intruder Alert & The Attack by Amin Bhatia / Symphony No. 10, Mvt. 2 by Dimitri Shostakovich / Countdown and Launch by Maverick Peterson & Dave Glyde / Adagio from Spartacus by Aram Khachaturian / Main Title (from Apollo 13) by James Horner	79.900	1st Place; Open Class; Champion
2016	To The Moon; Claire de Lune by Claude Debussy / Leonardo Dreams of His Flying Machine by Eric Whitacre / Space Race by John Meehan / Hostility: Intruder Alert & The Attack by Amin Bhatia / Symphony No. 10, Mvt. 2 by Dimitri Shostakovich / Countdown and Launch by Maverick Peterson & Dave Glyde / Adagio from Spartacus by Aram Khachaturian / Main Title (from Apollo 13) by James Horner	83.325	15th Place; World Class; Semifinalist
2017	The World the Children Made; Satellite by Jono Grant, Tony McGuinness, Paavo Siljamäki & Justine Suissa (Above & Beyond) / Spiritual Planet by Wataru Hokoyama / Pure Imagination by Leslie Bricusse & Anthony Newley / Original Music by John Meehan, Dave Glyde & Maverick Peterson / Worlds (Narration and Voice Samples) by Porter Robinson	79.625	2nd Place; Open Class; Finalist
2017	The World the Children Made; Satellite by Jono Grant, Tony McGuinness, Paavo Siljamäki & Justine Suissa (Above & Beyond) / Spiritual Planet by Wataru Hokoyama / Pure Imagination by Leslie Bricusse & Anthony Newley / Original Music by John Meehan, Dave Glyde & Maverick Peterson / Worlds (Narration and Voice Samples) by Porter Robinson	80.050	19th Place; World Class; Semifinalist
2018	The Other Side; Dance Macabre by Camille Saint-Saëns / The Carnival of the Animals by Camille Saint-Saëns / Dead Man's Party by Danny Elfman / Hello by Adele Adkins & Greg Kurstin / Come Together by John Lennon & Paul McCartney / The Ecstasy of Gold by Ennio Morricone / A Time for Us (from Romeo and Juliet) by Nino Rota	79.600	2nd Place; Open Class; Finalist
2018	The Other Side; Dance Macabre by Camille Saint-Saëns / The Carnival of the Animals by Camille Saint-Saëns / Dead Man's Party by Danny Elfman / Hello by Adele Adkins & Greg Kurstin / Come Together by John Lennon & Paul McCartney / The Ecstasy of Gold by Ennio Morricone / A Time for Us (from Romeo and Juliet) by Nino Rota	80.037	19th Place; World Class; Semifinalist
2019	Re:Calling; 1000 Airplanes on the Roof by Philip Glass / Hello by Lionel Richie / Phrygian Gates by John Adams / Visionary by Ken Froelich	Did not attend World Championships	
2020	Season canceled due to the COVID-19 pandemic		
2021	Opted out of competition for the season		
2022	I AM; Original Music by John Meehan, Sean Clark & Chavadith Tantavirojn	81.588	3rd Place; Open Class; Finalist
2022	I AM; Original Music by John Meehan, Sean Clark & Chavadith Tantavirojn	78.375	22nd Place; World Class; Semifinalist
2023	Fathers of Electricity; Original Music by John Meehan, Sean Clark & Chavadith Tantavirojn	Did not attend World Championships	
2024	Sacred Geometry; Ordo Virtutum by Hildegard von Bingen / O Magnum Mysterium by Tomas Luis de Victoria / Geometry by Sean Clark and Chavadith Tantavirojn / Primacy of Number by Philip Glass / Stabat Mater by Jean-Charles Gandrille / The Laws of Nature by Sean Clark and Chavadith Tantavirojn / Once Upon a Castle by Michael Daugherty	82.475	2nd Place; Open Class; Finalist
2024	Sacred Geometry; Ordo Virtutum by Hildegard von Bingen / O Magnum Mysterium by Tomas Luis de Victoria / Geometry by Sean Clark and Chavadith Tantavirojn / Primacy of Number by Philip Glass / Stabat Mater by Jean-Charles Gandrille / The Laws of Nature by Sean Clark and Chavadith Tantavirojn / Once Upon a Castle by Michael Daugherty	81.075	20th Place; World Class; Semifinalist
2025	Lethologica; Music by John Meehan, Chavadith Tantavirojn, and Sean Clark / Signal Fires by Fred Sturm / Enjoy the Silence by Depeche Mode / Free Bird by Lynyrd Skynyrd	Did not attend World Championships	
2026	Mise En Place; Everything in Its Right Place by Radiohead / Fly With Me by Ibrahim Maalouf / Alone in a Crowd by Jeff Beal / Come What May (from Moulin Rogue!) by David Baerwald & Kevin Gilbert / Rush by Seatbelts / Closing Time by Dan Wilson (Semisonic)	81.725	1st Place; Open Class; Champion
2026	Mise En Place; Everything in Its Right Place by Radiohead / Fly With Me by Ibrahim Maalouf / Alone in a Crowd by Jeff Beal / Come What May (from Moulin Rogue!) by David Baerwald & Kevin Gilbert / Rush by Seatbelts / Closing Time by Dan Wilson (Semisonic)	81.375	18th Place; World Class; Semifinalist

== Blue Devils C Drum and Bugle Corps ==
The Blue Devils C Drum and Bugle Corps are an Open Class competitive junior drum and bugle corps and a feeder corps for the Blue Devils Drum and Bugle Corps.

As a junior cadet corps, with members aged 8–14, the unit for many years performed only as a parade and exhibition unit, not entering actual competition. The corps began entering field competitions in 2001, but the corps still performs almost exclusively on the West Coast.

In 2026, BDC changed the age requirement, focused on high-school students, aged 14-18. BD Juniors was formed for members aged 8-14.
