= Monsters University (soundtrack) =

Monsters University (Original Soundtrack)

Soundtrack album by Randy Newman
- Released: June 18, 2013
- Recorded: 2012–2013
- Studios: Sony Scoring Stage, Sony Pictures; Eastwood Scoring Stage, Warner Bros.
- Genre: Film soundtrack
- Length: 55:11
- Label: Walt Disney
- Producers: Randy Newman; David Boucher

Randy Newman chronology
Toy Story 3 (2010)	Monsters University (Original Soundtrack) (2013)	Cars 3 (2017)

Monsters University (Original Soundtrack) is the soundtrack to the 2013 film Monsters University directed by Dan Scanlon. The album accompanies 20 tracks featuring musical score composed and conducted by Randy Newman and the original song "Roar" performed by Axwell and Sebastian Ingrosso from the Swedish House Mafia. The soundtrack was released through Walt Disney Records on June 18, 2013.

== Development ==
Monsters University featured music composed by longtime Pixar collaborator Randy Newman who scored Monsters, Inc. Scanlon felt that music was important to capture the "fun, freewheeling college atmosphere". The titular themes were recorded by the Pixar Canada studio team who were projected as the alma mater for the voices of the monster students. Newman used the clarinet for Mike's theme which changes as his character arc evolves, while the Oozma Kappa fraternity's music being represented with the accordion as a laidback shuffle to introduce Sulley.

Newman collaborated with the Blue Devils Drum and Bugle Corps group Blue Devils Entertainment to incorporate the percussion music so that it makes up for a collegiate sound; the percussions were recorded at the Skywalker Ranch and were written by Blue Devils percussion caption head Scott Johnson. Johannes Brahms' "Academic Festival Overture" is incorporated in the sequence when Mike is riding the pig. The 112-piece orchestra was recorded at the Sony Scoring Stage in Sony Pictures Studios and at the Eastwood Scoring Stage in Warner Bros. Studios.

"It's really a fun song. I remember watching the animator work on this scene. As he played back the song, the artist at the next desk—who wasn't even working on the movie—couldn't help moving his feet. Obviously, that guy had been hearing that song for days, but yet the second he heard it, he just had to move his feet."

— Dan Scanlon, on the song "Roar"

Axwell and Sebastian Ingrosso from the electronic supergroup Swedish House Mafia wrote the original song "Roar", that was featured in a frat party dance sequence and was the first electronic dance number composed for a Pixar film. According to Axwell, "We wanted to keep it funny, funky and at the same time a bit cool with a hint of monsters in it".´

The instrumental piece "Scare Pig" features bars from "Gaudeamus igitur", a popular academic graduation and commercium song in many European countries and universities.

== Release ==
Walt Disney Records released the soundtrack on June 18, 2013, three days prior to the film's release. The song "Roar" was preceded as the single on June 4, that was accompanied with the remixes of the track by Style of Eye and Yogi.

== Critical reception ==
Filmtracks.com wrote "while it would have been nice to hear the Monsters, Inc. score extended and better defined in the prequel, it's clear that a completely new musical direction was intended for Monsters University. Unfortunately, while the overarching thematic continuity is improved, the general personality of the work fails to really grab you, much like the original." Corey Hall of Metro Times wrote "the jubilant marching band-inspired soundtrack, are enough to keep kids enthralled and parents amused." Martin Barratt of The Salvation Army wrote "The soundtrack from Oscar winner Randy Newman was especially enjoyable. The jazzed-up drumline marching band music has a wide range of emotions and really adds to the film." Kimberley Jones of The Austin Chronicle summarized "composer Randy Newman keeps the energy level high with his drumline-heavy score."

== Track listing ==
All music is composed by Randy Newman.

Monsters University (Original Soundtrack) track listing
No.	Title	Length
1.	"Main Title"	0:52
2.	"Young Michael"	3:58
3.	"First Day at MU"	4:32
4.	"Dean Hardscrabble"	3:19
5.	"Sulley"	0:48
6.	"Scare Pig"	2:00
7.	"Wasted Potential"	1:16
8.	"Oozma Kappa"	3:16
9.	"Stinging Glow Urchin"	2:34
10.	"Field Trip"	3:57
11.	"Rise and Shine"	3:00
12.	"The Library"	3:44
13.	"Roar" (Axwell and Sebastian Ingrosso of Swedish House Mafia)	2:55
14.	"The Scare Games"	6:00
15.	"Did You Do This?"	2:00
16.	"Human World"	2:07
17.	"The Big Scare"	3:02
18.	"Goodbyes"	3:11
19.	"Mike and Sulley"	1:12
20.	"Monsters University"	1:34
Total length:		55:15

== Personnel ==
Credits adapted from liner notes.

- Music – Randy Newman
- Music producer – David Boucher, Randy Newman
- Recording and mixing – David Boucher
- Mastering – Bob Ludwig
- Music editor – Bruno Coon
- Assistant music editor – Brenda Heins
- Executive producer – Chris Montan
- Musical assistance – Jill Heffley
- Music co-ordinator – Ashley Chafin
- Music supervisor – Tom MacDougall

Orchestra

- Orchestration – Dan Higgins, J.A.C. Redford, Jeremy Lamb, Jonathan Sacks, Randy Newman
- Concertmaster – Bruce Dukov
- Orchestra conductor and leader – Randy Newman
- Orchestra contractor – Gina Zimmitti, Sandy DeCrescent
- Music preparation – JoAnn Kane Music Service

Instruments

- Accordion – Dart Zubis, Nicholas Ariondo
- Bass – Bruce Morgenthaler, Christian C. Kollgaard, Chuck Berghofer, David Parmeter, Ed Meares, Nico Abondolo, Oscar Hidalgo, Drew Dembowski
- Bass Guitar – Bob Glaub, Davey Faragher
- Bassoon – Kenneth Munday, Rose M. Corrigan, Michael O'Donovan
- Cello – Antony Cooke, Armen Ksajikian, Cecilia Tsan, Christine Ermacoff, David Speltz, George Kim Scholes, Giovanna M. Clayton, John Walz, Paul A. Cohen, Stephen J. Erdody, Timothy E. Landauer, Dennis Karmazyn
- Clarinet – Benjamin E. Lulich, Gary Bovyer, Ralph W. Williams, Stuart Clark
- Drums – Matt Hankle, Pete Thomas
- Flute – Benjamin M. Smolen, Jennifer L. Olson, Steve Kujala, Heather Clark
- French horn – Daniel Kelley, David L. Everson, Mark Adams, Phillip Yao, Steven Becknell, James Thatcher
- Guitar – George Doering, Timothy May, Val McCallum
- Harp – JoAnn Turovsky, Marcia Dickstein
- Oboe – Lara K. Wickes, Leslie Reed, Phillip Ayling
- Organ – Mitchell Froom
- Percussion – Alex Acuña, Don Williams, Luis Conte, Peter Limonick, Steven Schaeffer, Alan Estes
- Piano – Alan Steinberger, Randy M. Kerber
- Saxophone – Bill Liston, Daniel Higgins, Gregory Huckins, John Yoakum, Rusty Higgins
- Timpani – Gregory Goodall
- Trombone – Alex Iles, William Reichenbach, George B. Thatcher, William Booth
- Trumpet – Barry E. Perkins, Daniel R. Fornero, David Washburn, Jon Lewis, Malcolm McNab
- Tuba – Douglas Tornquist, James Self
- Viola – Alma Fernandez, David Walther, Erik Rynearson, Keith Greene, Marlow Fisher, Matthew J. Funes, Michael Nowak, Robert A. Brophy, Roland Kato, Scott C. Hosfeld, Shawn P. Mann, Thomas M. Diener, Victoria E. Miskolczy, Brian Dembow
- Violin – Aimee Kreston, Alyssa Park, Amy Hershberger, Ana Landauer, Anatoly Rosinsky, Aroussiak G. Baltaian, Dimitrie J. Leivici, Eun-Mee Ahn, Grace Oh, Helen Nightengale, Irina Voloshina, Jacqueline Brand, Jay Rosen, Jeanne Evans, Jeanne Skrocki, Julie Gigante, Lisa Sutton, Lorenz Gamma, Marc Sazer, Maria Newman, Natalie Leggett, Phillip I. Levy, Rafael Rishik, Richard Altenbach, Roger Wilkie, Sara Parkins, Sarah Thornblade, Serena McKinney, Tamara L. Hatwan, Tereza Stanislav

== Accolades ==
Accolades for Monsters University (Original Soundtrack)
Award	Date of ceremony	Category	Result
Annie Awards	February 1, 2014	Music in an Animated Feature Production	Nominated
