= Phantom Regiment Drum and Bugle Corps =

Junior drum and bugle corps based in Rockford, Illinois

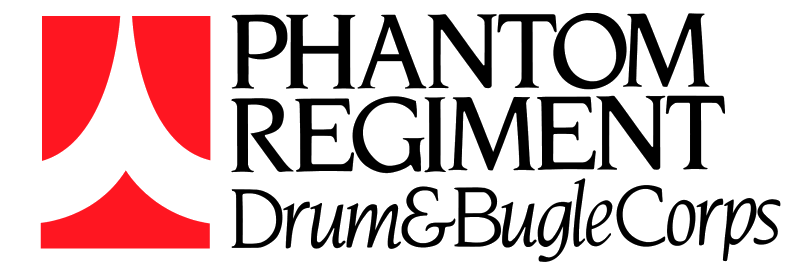
- Location: Rockford, Illinois
- Division: World Class
- Founded: 1956
- Director: Dwight Emmert
- CEO: Amanda Hamaker
- Championship titles: DCI: 1996 (tie); 2008

Phantom Regiment Drum and Bugle Corps (commonly referred to as "Phantom") is a World Class competitive drum and bugle corps based in Rockford, Illinois, USA. The corps is a long-standing member of Drum Corps International (DCI), having been a DCI World Championship Top Twelve Finalist every year since 1974 and DCI World Champions in 1996 (tie) and 2008.

== History ==
The corps was founded in 1956 by Alex Haddad, a member of the Col. Thomas G. Lawler VFW Post 342. Under his direction, the corps was named the Rockford Rangers, with all-male drum and bugle sections and an all-female color guard named the Rangerettes. However, when many of the charter members were impressed by the recording of the Syracuse Brigadiers performing the Leroy Anderson composition The Phantom Regiment, the name was changed before the unit made its debut, with the color guard renamed the Phantomettes.

In its early years, the Phantomettes and a corps-sponsored all-boy color guard called the Raiders were competitively successful. The drum and bugle corps, however, struggled. In 1962, the corps bought a set of high quality bugles that had belonged to the Commonwealth Edison Knights of Light Drum and Bugle Corps, which had folded two years earlier. With the new instruments and a new brass arranger, the corps began to improve. The old set of bugles went to the newly formed Phantom Regiment Cadets.

Despite the Phantomettes having placed second at the 1962 color guard national championships, in 1963, Phantom Regiment fielded an all-male corps, including the color guard. When scores fell behind those of the previous season, the Phantomettes returned to the corps for 1964. With the girls back in the corps, successful recruitment, and new uniforms, the corps had its best season until that time, including a finish of 15th among 45 corps at the VFW National Championship preliminaries in Cleveland. The Phantomettes were honored in the graphic on the City of Rockford's 1964 vehicle registration stickers. But on August 21, 1964, Regimental Hall, the corps' home base, was badly damaged by a fire. The organization was forced to sell its instruments and uniforms to pay off its debts.

Financially unable to field a corps in 1965 through 1967, alumni and former staff members reorganized and officially incorporated on September 11, 1967. At the first meeting of the newly restructured corps in January, there were 28 members. The Regiment's 1968 drum and horn lines dressed in black pants and a red windbreaker with a black and white vertical stripe on the left side; the guard wore the same windbreaker, black Bermuda shorts and an "Aussie" style hat. The season consisted mostly of parades, with few field contests. The corps owned one vehicle; a red step van to carry the equipment. In that first year of the corps' return, perhaps the corps' greatest asset was its new musical arranger, Phantom Regiment alumnus and future DCI Hall of Fame member, Jim Wren, who would go on to arrange the unit's brass music for the next 32 years.

By 1970, Phantom was able to outfit the corps in new uniforms; a cadet-style jacket with a red diagonal sash dividing the black right side from the white left side, black pants with a white stripe, white buck shoes, and a shako with a 12-inch plume. The corps had grown to 89 members with 40 horns, 14 drums, 24 flags, 12 rifles, and a drum major.

In 1971, Wren started adding the classical music pieces that would become Phantom's trademark along with the usual pop music that most corps were playing.

Prior to the founding of DCI in 1972, the Phantom Regiment, like most corps of the time, was strictly a local organization. The members and the staff came from Rockford and its surrounding suburbs. Travel to contests was limited to perhaps a few hours of driving. The only "National" competition the corps had ever entered had been the 1964 VFW championships in Cleveland. The corps attended the first DCI competition, in Whitewater, Wisconsin, placing 23rd of 39 corps in prelims. In 1973, The corps returned to Whitewater and moved up to 14th place among 48 corps.

In 1974, Phantom presented its first full program of all-classical musical selections. The corps had grown to DCI's maximum of 128 members, and it took its first extended tour, travelling to Kentucky, Ohio, Pennsylvania, and Massachusetts en route to the DCI Championships in Ithaca, New York. The corps was beating many of the activity's traditional powers and earning a reputation as a power in its own right. At DCI, the Regiment earned its first Top Twelve Finalist placement, beginning a string that has held through 2026. In prelims, the corps shocked many by placing 8th, although they fell back to 11th at Finals.

Once the corps became a DCI Finalist, it also became a consistent contender, placing 10th in 1975, 4th in 1976, and having a frustrating run of second-place finishes in 1977, 1978 and 1979 with the corps scoring within tenths of a point from the title.

A fall to a 10th-place finish in 1986 led the corps to take a new approach. Three years of improvement, culminated in 1989 with another second-place finish, with Phantom's score of 98.400 tying the previous DCI highest score ever.

From 1975, Phantom Regiment's field visual shows had been designed by Norm Wheeler through 1979, when in 1980 future DCI Hall of Fame member John Brazale would move from Color Guard caption Head to Visual program Design Caption. Returning home after the 1992 DCI Championships, Brazale had complained of having severe headaches during the last few weeks, and was soon diagnosed with an inoperable brain tumor, and died within months.

In 1996, Phantom Regiment tied the Blue Devils of Concord, California for its first Drum International World Championship. Jim Wren arranged for the corps from 1967 through the 1999 season, and then retired as the corps' musical arranger. Michael Klesch took over arranging duties in 2000 and 2001, and was then followed by alumnus J.D. Shaw, who arranged the corps' music from the 2002 season through the 2011 season. After spending the 2012–2019 seasons with the Santa Clara Vanguard, J.D. Shaw returned to Phantom Regiment after the 2019 season.

In 2008, with its performance of "Spartacus", Phantom Regiment defeated the Blue Devils Drum and Bugle Corps by a margin of 0.025 to win its second Drum International World Championship.

Through 2019, Phantom Regiment has continued to be a consistent finalist, with the streak extending through 45 consecutive top-12 finishes. In 2022, the first year of competition since the COVID-19 Pandemic, Phantom Regiment returned with their highest placement since 2016, and highest score since 2014.

== Show summary (1972–2026) ==
Key
Pale blue background indicates DCI World Class Finalist (Note: From 1972-1991, Phantom Regiment competed in Open Class; from 1992-2007 in Division I, and since 2008 in World Class. These are the same tier, just renamed.)
Dark gold background indicates DCI World Class Champion

Year	Repertoire	World Championships	
Year	Repertoire	Score	Placement
1972	March (from La damnation de Faust) by Hector Berlioz / The Phantom Regiment by Leroy Anderson / America the Beautiful by Katherine Lee Bates & Samuel A. Ward / Funeral March of a Marionette by Charles Gounod / Poet & Peasant Overture by Franz von Suppé / Shot in the Dark by Henry Mancini / Spellbound Concerto by Miklós Rózsa	64.400	23rd Place; Open Class
1973	Night on Bald Mountain by Modest Mussorgsky / The Lord's Prayer (from King of Kings) by Miklós Rózsa / MacArthur Park by Jimmy Webb / Poet and Peasant Overture & Light Cavalry Overture by Franz von Suppé / Jubilance by James Swearingen	74.700	14th Place; Open Class
1974	Festive Overture & Fifth Symphony by Dmitri Shostakovich / Poet and Peasant Overture by Franz von Suppé / Night on Bald Mountain by Modest Mussorgsky / Romeo and Juliet by Pyotr Ilyich Tchaikovsky / Les Préludes by Franz Liszt	76.250	11th Place; Open Class; Finalist
1975	American Overture by Joseph Willcox Jenkins / Hungarian Dance No. 5 by Johannes Brahms / Barber of Seville by Gioachino Rossini / An American in Paris by George Gershwin / Pilgrim's Chorus (from Tannhäuser) by Richard Wagner	81.30	10th Place; Open Class; Finalist
1976	Finale (from Symphony No. 7) by Gustav Mahler / Symphony No. 6 by Pyotr Ilyich Tchaikovsky / Tocatta and Fugue in D Minor by Johann Sebastian Bach / An American in Paris by George Gershwin / Pilgrim's Chorus (from Tannhäuser) by Richard Wagner	87.75	4th Place; Open Class; Finalist
1977	New World Symphony by Antonín Dvořák / Piano Concerto No. 1 by Pyotr Ilyich Tchaikovsky / Pagliacci by Ruggero Leoncavallo / Flight of the Bumblebee by Nikolai Rimsky-Korsakov / Ode to Joy (from Symphony No. 9) by Ludwig van Beethoven	90.300	2nd Place; Open Class; Finalist
1978	Firebird, Rite Of Spring, Petrouchka, Dance Infernale & Sherzo A La Russe by Igor Stravinsky / Piano Concerto in A Minor by Edvard Grieg / Flight of the Bumblebee by Nikolai Rimsky-Korsakov / Ode to Joy (from Symphony No. 9) by Ludwig van Beethoven	91.450	2nd Place; Open Class; Finalist
1979	Third Symphony by Camille Saint-Saëns / Malambo (from Estancia) by Alberto Ginastera / Morning Mood (from Peer Gynt Suite No. 1), Piano Concerto in A Minor, Hall of the Mountain King (from Peer Gynt Suite No. 1) & March of the Dwarfs (from Lyric Suite) by Edvard Grieg / Elsa's Procession to the Cathedral (from Lohengrin) by Richard Wagner	92.750	2nd Place; Open Class; Finalist
1980	Russian Easter Overture by Nikolai Rimsky-Korsakov / Romany Life (from The Fortune Teller) by Victor Herbert / Polovetsian Dances (from Prince Igor) by Alexander Borodin / Masquerade Suite by Carl Nielsen / Carmen Suite by Georges Bizet, adapted by Ernest Guiraud	88.450	5th Place; Open Class; Finalist
1981	Spartacus; Triumph of Rome, Gladiator Fight, Dance of the Rebels, Prelude to Battle, Battle, Sunrise & Apotheosis; All from Spartacus by Aram Khachaturian	90.850	5th Place; Open Class; Finalist
1982	Spartacus; Triumph of Rome, Slave Dance, Gladiator Fight, Mourning and Uprising, Prelude to Battle, Battle, Sunrise & Apotheosis; All from Spartacus by Aram Khachaturian	92.150	4th Place; Open Class; Finalist
1983	Serenade for Strings, Cossack Dance, Dance Neapolitan & 1812 Overture; All by Pyotr Ilyich Tchaikovsky	91.450	4th Place; Open Class; Finalist
1984	Scythian Suite by Sergei Prokofiev / Armenian Dances by Alfred Reed / Trypitch by Anthony J. Cirone / 1812 Overture by Pyotr Ilyich Tchaikovsky	95.600	4th Place; Open Class; Finalist
1985	Symphony Fantastique; Symphony Fantastique by Hector Berlioz	90.100	8th Place; Open Class; Finalist
1986	Carnival Overture by Antonín Dvořák / Alborada Del Gracioso by Maurice Ravel / Sir Lancelot and the Black Knight & Merlin The Magician by Rick Wakeman / Symphony No. 2 by Gustav Mahler	85.000	10th Place; Open Class; Finalist
1987	Songs from the Winter Palace; Selections from Swan Lake & The Nutcracker by Pyotr Ilyich Tchaikovsky	94.300	5th Place; Open Class; Finalist
1988	Romeo and Juliet; Selections from Romeo and Juliet by Pyotr Ilyich Tchaikovsky and Sergei Prokofiev	93.500	6th Place; Open Class; Finalist
1989	From The New World... Into A New Age; Symphony No. 9, Mvts. 1 & 2; Slavonic Dances No. 1; Symphony No. 9, Mvt. 4 All by Antonín Dvořák	98.400	2nd Place; Open Class; Finalist
1990	Dreams of Desire; Symphony No. 3, "Organ Symphony", Mvt. 4; The Elephant & Finale (from The Carnival of the Animals) & Bacchanale (from Samson and Delilah); All by Camille Saint-Saëns	95.300	4th Place; Open Class; Finalist (tie) (Note: In 1990, Phantom Regiment and the Blue Devils tied for 4th place.)
1991	Phantom Voices; Nessun Dorma (from Turandot) by Giacomo Puccini / Pagliacci by Ruggero Leoncavallo / Bacchanale (from Samson and Delilah) by Camille Saint-Saëns	95.400	3rd Place; Open Class; Finalist
1992	War and Peace; Marche Slav by Pyotr Ilyich Tchaikovsky / La Marseillaise by Claude Joseph Rouget de Lisle / 1812 Overture by Pyotr Ilyich Tchaikovsky	91.500	8th Place; Division I Finalist
1993	The Modern Imagination; The Landworkers, The Wheat Dance & Danza Final (from Estancia) by Alberto Ginastera / The Fire of Eternal Glory (Novorossik Chimes) by Dmitri Shostakovich / Death Hunt (from On Dangerous Ground) by Bernard Herrmann	96.200	3rd Place; Division I Finalist
1994	Songs for a Summer Night; Ritual Fire Dance (from El amor brujo) by Manuel de Falla / Claire De Lune by Claude Debussy / Talking Drums (from White Witch Doctor), Theme from North by Northwest & Death Hunt (from On Dangerous Ground) by Bernard Herrmann	96.200	3rd Place; Division I Finalist
1995	Adventures Under a Darkened Sky; Symphonic Dances, Rhapsody on a Theme of Paganini (Variation 18), Piano Concerto No. 2 & Capriccio Bohemian; All by Sergei Rachmaninoff	94.100	5th Place; Division I Finalist
1996	A Defiant Heart: The Music of Dmitri Shostakovich; Ballet Suite No. 4; Symphony No. 1, Mvt. 2 & Symphony No. 5, Mvt. 4 All by Dmitri Shostakovich	97.400	1st Place; Division I Champion (tie) (Note: In 1996, Phantom Regiment and the Blue Devils tied for 1st place.)
1997	The Ring; Hagen's Call to the Clan (from Götterdämmerung), Magic Fire Music (from Die Walküre), Hammering of the Ring (from Das Rheingold) & Die Götterdämmerung (from Götterdämmerung); All from Der Ring des Nibelungen by Richard Wagner	94.200	4th Place; Division I Finalist
1998	Songs from the Eternal City: The Music of Rome; Roman Carnival Overture by Hector Berlioz / Un Bel Di (from Madama Butterfly) by Giacomo Puccini / Pines of the Villa Borghese & Pines of the Appian Way by Ottorino Respighi	90.400	8th Place; Division I Finalist
1999	Tragedy and Triumph; Symphony No. 4, Symphony No. 5, Mvt. 2 & Symphony No. 6 All by Pyotr Ilyich Tchaikovsky	91.200	8th Place; Division I Finalist
2000	The Masters of Mystique: The Dawn of Modern Music; Jeux by Claude Debussy / Petrouchka by Igor Stravinsky / Transfigured Night by Arnold Schoenberg / Rite of Spring by Igor Stravinsky	90.650	7th Place; Division I Finalist
2001	Virtuoso; Finale & Game of Pairs (from Concerto for Orchestra) by Béla Bartók / Festive Overture by Dmitri Shostakovich	91.900	6th Place; Division I Finalist
2002	Heroic Sketches: The Passion of Shostakovich; Symphony No. 10, Mvt. 2; Piano Concerto No. 2, Mvt. 2; Piano Concerto No. 2, Mvt. 1 & Symphony No. 7, Mvt. 4 All by Dmitri Shostakovich	92.400	5th Place; Division I Finalist (tie) (Note: In 2002, Phantom Regiment and the Boston Crusaders tied for 5th place.)
2003	Harmonic Journey; Sanctus (Canon in D) by Johann Pachelbel / Wild Nights (from Harmonium) by John Adams / The Lord's Prayer (from King of Kings) by Miklós Rózsa / Ostinato (from Mikrokosmos) by Béla Bartók	94.750	4th Place; Division I Finalist
2004	Apasionada 874; Buenos Aires Hora Cero, La Muerte del Angel, Oblivion, Imagines 676, Adios Nonino & Tres Minutos con la Realidad; All by Ástor Piazzolla	93.575	5th Place; Division I Finalist
2005	Rhapsody; An American in Paris & Rhapsody in Blue by George Gershwin	96.825	3rd Place; Division I Finalist
2006	Faust; Scythian Suite by Sergei Prokofiev / Ave Maria by Franz Biebl / Piano Concerto by John Corigliano / Symphony No. 2 by Gustav Mahler	96.850	2nd Place; Division I Finalist
2007	On Air; Vespertine Formations by Christopher Deane / 1000 Airplanes on the Roof by Philip Glass / Flower Duet (from Lakmé) by Léo Delibes / Suggestion Diabolique by Sergei Prokofiev / Finale (from The Firebird) by Igor Stravinsky	94.850	4th Place; Division I Finalist
2008	Spartacus; Ein Heldenleben by Richard Strauss / Toccata (from Piano Concerto No. 1) by Alberto Ginastera / Dance of Ecstasy (from Danses Fantastiques) by Loris Tjeknavorian / Spartacus by Aram Khachaturian / Battlefield (from Kà) by René Dupéré	98.125	1st Place; World Class; Champion
2009	The Red Violin; Theme from The Red Violin by John Corigliano / Fantasy Variations on a Theme by Nicolo Paganini by James Barnes / Paganini Variations by Witold Lutoslawski / Rhapsody on a Theme of Paganini by Sergei Rachmaninoff / Caprice XXIV by Benny Goodman / Paganini Variations by Philip Wilby	89.900	9th Place; World Class; Finalist
2010	Into the Light; The New Moon in the Old Moon's Arms by Michael Kamen	93.150	6th Place; World Class; Finalist
2011	Juliet; East of Eden by Lee Holdridge / Requiem by Giuseppe Verdi / Lacrimosa dies illa & Confutatis maledictis (from Requiem) by Wolfgang Amadeus Mozart / Love Theme from Romeo & Juliet by Nino Rota / Romeo and Juliet by Sergei Prokofiev / Elsa's Procession to the Cathedral (from Lohengrin) by Richard Wagner	95.050	5th Place; World Class; Finalist
2012	Turandot; Popolo di Pechino!; Indietro, cani; Gira la cote!... Perche tarda la luna?; O mondo, o mondo... O tigre, o tigre!; Gravi, enormi ed imponenti; Gloria, gloria; Tre enigmi m'hai & Nessun dorma! All from Turandot by Giacomo Puccini	96.550	3rd Place; World Class; Finalist
2013	Triumphant Journey; Music from Elizabeth: The Golden Age by A. R. Rahman & Craig Armstrong / Cape Fear by Bernard Herrmann / Four Sea Interludes by Benjamin Britten / Enigma Variations: Nimrod by Edward Elgar / Symphony No. 11 by Dmitri Shostakovich	93.250	6th Place; World Class; Finalist
2014	Swan Lake; Swan Lake by Pyotr Ilyich Tchaikovsky / La Péri by Paul Dukas / Dracula (Act III) by Philip Feeny / A Fateful Meeting, Beauty Killed the Beast, & Tooth and Claw (from King Kong) by James Newton Howard / Mother and Child (from Flightplan) by James Horner	91.425	7th Place; World Class; Finalist
2015	City of Light; I Love Paris by Cole Porter / Horoscope by Constant Lambert / Claire de Lune by Claude Debussy / Piano Concerto in C♯ Minor by Francis Poulenc / An American in Paris by George Gershwin / Symphony No. 3 (Organ Symphony) by Camille Saint-Saens	90.325	7th Place; World Class; Finalist
2016	Voice of Promise; Preludes for Piano Op. 34, No. 14 by Dmitri Shostakovich / The Chairman Dances by John Adams / Ave Verum Corpus by Colin Mawby / The Darkest Moment by Rob Ferguson & Bret Kuhn / Hymne Des Fraternises: I'm Dreaming of Home by Phillipe Rombi / Young Person's Guide to the Orchestra by Benjamin Britten	89.963	8th Place; World Class; Finalist
2017	Phantasm; Finlandia by Jean Sibelius / Symphony No. 12 by Dmitri Shostakovich / Entering the Nightmare (from Dreamscape) by Maurice Jarre / Piano Concerto No. 2 by Sergei Rachmaninoff / Symphony No. 3 by Aram Khachaturian	88.125	9th Place; World Class; Finalist
2018	This New World; Finale (from Mr. Magorium's Wonder Emporium) by Aaron Zigman & Alexandre Desplat / Piano Concerto No. 3 by Sergei Prokofiev / A Child's Garden of Dreams by David Maslanka / Picture Studies by Adam Schoenberg / New World Symphony by Antonín Dvořák	86.950	11th Place; World Class; Finalist
2019	I Am Joan; Carmina Burana by Carl Orff / Audivi Media Nocte by Oliver Waespi / Zohar by Jonathan Leshnoff / Fire of Eternal Glory & Lady McBeth of Mtsensk by Dmitri Shostakovich / Vox Populi by Jared Leto (30 Seconds to Mars) / Unleashed by Thomas Bergersen (Two Steps from Hell)	87.238	12th Place; World Class; Finalist
2020	Season canceled due to the COVID-19 pandemic		
2021	Harmonic Journey; Sanctus (Canon in D) by Johann Pachelbel / Wild Nights (from Harmonium) by John Adams / The Lord's Prayer (from King of Kings) by Miklós Rózsa / Ostinato (from Mikrokosmos) by Béla Bartók	No scored competitions	
2022	No Walk Too Far; Before Time by Thomas Bergersen / Godspeed! & The Chosen by Stephen Melillo / Eli's Theme (from Let the Right One In) by Johan Söderqvist / Symphony No. 5 by Gustav Mahler	90.675	8th Place; World Class; Finalist
2023	Exogenesis; The 2nd Law: Isolated System & Supremacy by Muse / As If A Voice Were In Them by Oliver Waespi / to wALk Or ruN in wEst harlem by Andy Akiho / Piano Concerto No. 2 by Sergei Rachmaninoff / For I Have Fought the Good Fight by Stephen Melillo	92.988	7th Place; World Class; Finalist
2024	Mynd; Moonlight Sonata by Ludwig van Beethoven / Surfacing by Dave Hall / Equilibrium by Paul Lovatt-Cooper / Fly or Die by Gilles Rocha / Pillar 3 by Andy Akiho	95.225	4th Place; World Class; Finalist
2025	Raindrop Prelude by Frédéric Chopin / Fuse by Nick Omiciolli / Funeral by the Sea by Ramin Djawadi / Transcend by Tyler Sammons & Matt Penland / Breath of Souls by Paul Lovatt-Cooper	94.300	6th Place; World Class; Finalist
2026	Bloodline; The Yeti by Magnus Brandseth / Exit Music (For A Film) by Radiohead / 1-2 Beaucoup by Trilok Gurtu / Z 1920 by Peter Graham	92.600	7th Place; World Class; Finalist

== Caption awards ==
At the annual World Championship Finals, Drum Corps International (DCI) presents awards to the corps with the high average scores from prelims, semifinals, and finals in five captions. Phantom Regiment has won these caption awards.

Don Angelica Best General Effect Award/Formerly Known: High General Effect

- 1991 (tie), 1996, 2008

Fred Sanford Best Percussion Performance Award

- 2006, 2008, 2010

Prior to 2000 and the adoption of the current scoring format, Phantom Regiment won these captions:

High Visual Award

- 1979, 1980, 1989, 1990 (tie)

High Color Guard Award

- 1977, 1979, 1988

High Brass Award

- 1978, 1989, 1996
