= BD Performing Arts =

Corporate entity that manages several performance groups in Concord, California

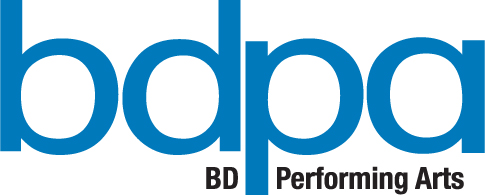
The logo of BD Performing Arts

BD Performing Arts is the corporate entity that manages several performance groups in Concord, California. Included in these groups are the three Blue Devils Drum & Bugle Corps, designated "A", "B", and "C"; the Blue Devils International Corps; the Blue Devils Open Class, A Class, and Special Needs Winter Guards; BD Winds (formally the Diablo Wind Symphony); RCC Indoor Percussion, Thesis Percussion, and BD Entertainment.

== History ==
=== 20th century ===
In 1957, Tony and Ann Odello and the Concord VFW post assumed control of the Martinettes, a defunct drum corps and drill team. They reorganized the unit as The Blue Devils, taking the name from the V.F.W.'s color (blue) and a local landmark, Mt. Diablo (devil). In its first season, the group performed as an all-boy drum corps with an all-girl drill team. In 1958, the Blue Devils added glockenspiels, becoming a drum and bell corps, while the girls became a separate a baton twirling troupe, the Majorettes. In 1961, the Blue Devils added a flag section to the unit that was then competing in the state's Junior division. Jerry Seawright succeeded Tony Odello as corps manager in 1964. In 1968, the drum and bell corps moved into Senior Division competition, becoming the Blue Devils "A" corps, and a new Blue Devils "B" Junior corps was begun. With all units of the Blue Devils organization enjoying success, the decision was made to transform the "A" drum and bell corps into a drum and bugle corps (D&B).

In 1970, a group of ten buglers was added to the Blue Devils drums and flags, and the corps entered its first competition as the Blue Devils Drum and Bugle Corps. In 1972, the unit advanced from Class B competition to Class A and made its first trip on tour outside California, competing in the Pacific Northwest.

In 1973, the organization incorporated as the Blue Devils Parents Association, a California non-profit 501(c)(3) corporation, and that summer, the Blue Devils "A" corp made its first national tour, concluding with its first appearance at the Drum Corps International World Championships in Whitewater, Wisconsin, where the corps finished 24th of 48 corps and earned Associate membership in DCI. Also in 1973, the Junior drum and bell corps became the Blue Devils B D&B Corps and the younger Blue Devils C D&B Corps was formed.

In 1974, the Blue Devils finished in 9th place at the DCI Championships; in 1975, advanced to 3rd place; and in 1976, won the first of the corps' record 21 DCI World Championship titles. Since 1991, the corps has been under the direction of Dave Gibbs, a former marching member and drum major. In 2009, the Blue Devils "B" corps won the first of 5 successive DCI Open Class World Championships.

=== 21st century ===
In 2008, the board of directors changed the name of the organization from the Blue Devils Parents Association to BD Performing Arts in order to more accurately reflect 1) the new corporate governance structure, and 2) a more encompassing name.

== Sponsored Units ==
Among the programs sponsored by BD Performing Arts are:

- The Blue Devils Drum and Bugle Corps (also known as the Blue Devils "A" Corps) - an internationally competitive drum and bugle corps founded in 1957 having 150 members between the ages of 17 and 21. The most decorated corps in the history of Drum Corps International (DCI), The Blue Devils "A" has never placed below 5th place since 1975, and have won twenty-one DCI World Championship titles.
- The Blue Devils B Drum and Bugle Corps - Founded as a cadet corps to the "A" corps in 1968, The BDB involves more than one hundred young people, aged 14–21, from throughout California. The corps won the DCI Open Class World Championships for 2009, 2010, 2011, 2014, 2016, and most recently in 2026.
- The Blue Devils C Drum and Bugle Corps - With 60 members from Contra Costa, Alameda, and Solano counties, BDC is a beginning-level music, dance, and marching activity for ages 8 to 14 founded in 1973.
- The Blue Devils International Corps - 97 member corps made up of alumni of the Blue Devils and 8 other DCI World Class corps that was organized in 2015 to spend more than a month traveling and performing in the Netherlands, United Kingdom, France, Italy, and Switzerland, concluding with 9 days and 15 performances of their 7–minute show at the Basel Tattoo in Switzerland.
- BD Winds - Established in 1996 as the Diablo Wind Symphony, the group of 60 to 80 local students, ages 14 to 21, performs concert of major wind and percussion compositions. Designed to work in cooperation with school music programs, the DWS offers a positive learning environment, master classes with professional music clinicians, and an annual concert season performing with internationally renowned soloists.
- the Blue Devils Winter Guards - A competitive program that combines music, dance, and props into a theatrical production performed on the floor of a gymnasium. The Blue Devils offer programs in both the Open Class (ages 14–23), A Class (ages 8–14) and also a Special Needs Guard, all involving more than 50 young performers.

BD Performing Arts is the owner of the System Blue Trademark and a supplier of educational programming and products for performance groups in the pageantry arts, such as drum and bugle corps, marching bands, and winter guards.

== Management ==
BD Performing Arts is a 501 (c)(3) musical organization and the corporate entity that manages the Blue Devils "A" Corps, the Blue Devils "B" Corps, the Blue Devils "C" Corps, the Blue Devils Open Class and A Class Winter Guards program, BD Winds (formally the Diablo Wind Symphony) RCC Percussion, Thesis Percussion, and BD Entertainment. The CEO of BD Performing Arts is Jim Verrett.

== Awards ==
=== Summary ===
BD Performing Arts organization has attained numerous International Championships in various performing arts activities, including:

- 21 International Drum and Bugle Corps Championships - World Class
- 5 International Drum and Bugle Corps Championships - Open Class
- 1 World Music Contest
- 4 Winter Guard International Championships
- 2 World Team Twirling Championships
- 3 CYO National Championships
- 12 National Team Twirling Championships
- 6 National Corps Twirling Championships

=== World, National, Regional & Local Titles ===
DCI World Champions: 1976, '77, '79, '80, '82*, '86, '94*, '96 (tie), '97, '99, 2003, '07, '09*, '10*, '12*, '14*, '15, '17, ’19, ’22*, ’23*

DCI Open Class Champions: 2009*-11, '14, '16, '26

World Music Contest Championship: 2005

Catholic Youth Organization National Champions: 1976, '78, '82

WGI Champions: 1995-98

World Team Twirling Champions: 1983 & '84

DCI 2nd Place: 1981, '83, '84, 2001, '02, '04, '08, '11, '13, '16, '18

DCI 3rd Place: 1975, '78, '85, '88, '95, '98, 2000, '06, '24

DCI Preview of Champions: 1994-'98

DCI South Champions: 1983, '87, 2004, '06-09

DCI Midwest Champions: 1976, '82, '86, '88, 2003, '04, '06, '07

DCI North Champions: 1976, '94, '95, 2004–07

DCI East Champions: 1978, '79, '86, '88, '96, '97, '99, 2001, '03, '04, '06, '07, '09, '10

DCI Mid-America Champions: 1995, 2000, '04, '06, '07

DCI Southwest Champions: 1998, '99, 2001, '07, '09, '10

DCI Canada Champions: 1980, '85, '90

DCI West Champions: 1976–79, 2008–10

Drums Along The Rockies Champions: 1980,'82, '83, '86, '88, '90, '92, '98, 2003, '08-10

Drum Corps East Champions: 1994

Drum Corps West Champions: 1996–98, 2007

World Open Champions: 1976, '78

U.S. Open Champions: 1979, '92

Pacific Procession Champions: 1980–83, '85, '86, '88, '90-98, 2001–04, '06

Precision West Champions: 1975–86, 1988–98, 2000-07^{See:Note A}

Undefeated seasons indicated by *.

In 2009, The Concord Blue Devils went undefeated and won their 13th World Championship with a record score (for the corps) of 99.05. This was also the first time an organization won both World and Open Class Championships with the Blue Devils B also going undefeated and winning their 1st World Championship.

In 2010, The Concord Blue Devils and Blue Devils B repeated their 2009 feat by once again winning the World and Open Class championships and the A corps completing back-to-back undefeated seasons, a first in DCI history. The B corps only lost one show in 2010.

In 2011, Blue Devils "B" repeated for a third straight year as Open Class World Champions, narrowly beating the Oregon Crusaders. The Crusaders beat BDB only days before the finals, providing their only loss of the season. In a changed format that year, Blue Devils "B" went on to place 19th at the World Class semifinals, beating out five World Class Corps (Jersey Surf, Cascades, Teal Sound, Mandarins, and Pioneer).

Note A: The 1999 Precision West show counted only as an exhibition show due to the city losing power halfway through the Blue Devils performance after the Santa Clara Vanguard had performed first. This show is unofficially referred to as the "Lights Out Show" and is considered by some to be one of the loudest and longest standing ovations in DCI history, given as a result of the members not stopping their performance when the lights went out. The power failed about a minute into the ballad section of the show, and the members continued to play and march to the end of the show in very dim and fading light. Many of the members in the corps feel that the "Lights Out Show" was a turning point for them, and that it had bonded the corps, eventually leading them to winning their 10th DCI World Championship.

Note B: The Blue Devils B-Corps won the DCI Open-Class Championship title for three consecutive years: 2009, 2010, and 2011, giving the organization another championship "Three-peat", the first for one of the organizations' drum corps. The Blue Devils Winter Guard won the Winter Guard International Independent World Championship from 1995 through 1998. The Twirling Corps won 6 National Corps and 12 National Team championships between 1977 and 1997.
