= Elliot del Borgo =

American composer and music educator

Elliot Del Borgo
- Born: October 27, 1938 (United States) Port Chester, New York, U.S.
- Died: May 30, 2013 (aged 74)
- Occupation: Composer

Elliot Del Borgo (October 27, 1938 – May 30, 2013) was an American composer and music educator.

Born in Port Chester, New York, Del Borgo earned a Bachelor of Science degree from the State University of New York at Potsdam (SUNY Potsdam) in 1960. He continued his music studies at Temple University, from which he received a Master of Education degree, and the Philadelphia Conservatory of Music, where his teachers included Vincent Persichetti (composition) and Gilbert Johnson (trumpet), and from which he earned a Master of Music degree. Del Borgo subsequently was a music teacher in the Philadelphia public schools.

In 1966, Del Borgo returned to SUNY Potsdam to join the faculty of the Crane School of Music. He taught at the Crane School of Music until 1995. SUNY granted Del Borgo doctoral equivalency in 1973. During his tenure, he served as the first chair of the Department of Music Theory, History and Composition, and directed the Crane Wind Ensemble. In 1993, the American Bandmasters Association elected Del Borgo to membership.

As a composer, Del Borgo wrote over 600 works, including music for the closing ceremony of the 1980 Winter Olympics in Lake Placid. His teaching compositions included two volumes titled Foundations for Strings. He also held membership in ASCAP.

Del Borgo married Nancy Withington on 20 June 1970. The couple had two daughters, Anne and Laura. His widow and daughters, two grandchildren, his brother Anthony, and his sister Gloria all survive him.
