= Scott Johnson (percussionist) =

American music educator and percussionist

Scott Johnson (sometimes referred to as ScoJo) is an American percussionist and music educator best known as the percussion director for the Blue Devils Drum and Bugle Corps. He is cited as one of the most influential members within the development of marching percussion. In 2012, He was inducted into the Drum Corps International Hall of Fame and the Winter Guard International Hall of Fame. In 2015, he was inducted into the World Drum Corps Hall of Fame.

From Hayward, California, Johnson began drumming at the age of four before joining the snare drum line of the Blue Devils as a teenager in 1976. He performed with the corps until 1979 and instructed the group as an assistant instructor until 1989. After leaving to teach at the Santa Clara Vanguard Drum and Bugle Corps, Johnson rejoined the Blue Devils to become the percussion arranger and director in 1994. Alongside his role in drum corps, he was also an instructor for the Riverside City College drumline.

He collaborated with Randy Newman to arrange the drumline tracks heard in the film Monsters University.
