= Space Escapade =

Studio album by Les Baxter and His Orchestra
- Released: 1958
- Genre: Space age pop; exotica; lounge
- Label: Capitol

Les Baxter and His Orchestra chronology
Pharaoh's Curse (1957)	Space Escapade (1958)	Selections from Rodgers and Hammerstein's South Pacific (1958)

Space Escapade is an album by Les Baxter and His Orchestra. It was released in 1958 on the Capitol label (catalog no. T-968). Baxter also composed the music.

AllMusic later gave the album a rating of four-and-a-half stars. Reviewer Matthew Greenwald wrote: "A real period piece, Space Escapade is a definitive slice of lounge/bachelor pad music. The music, of course, is a bit dated, although it certainly shows off Baxter's chops as a big-band leader."

== Track listing ==
Side 1

1. "Shooting Star"
2. "Moonscape"
3. "Mr. Robot"
4. "The City"
5. "A Distant Star"
6. "The Commuter"

Side 2

1. "Winds of Sirius"
2. "The Other Side of the Moon"
3. "A Look Back at Earth"
4. "Earth Light"
5. "The Lady Is Blue"
6. "Saturday Night on Saturn"
