= Apollo 13 (soundtrack) =

Apollo 13: Music From The Motion Picture

Soundtrack album by James Horner
- Released: June 27, 1995
- Genre: Soundtrack
- Length: 77:41
- Label: MCA
- Producer: James Horner

James Horner chronology
Braveheart (1995)	Apollo 13 (2019)	Jade (1995)

Apollo 13: Music From The Motion Picture is the soundtrack to the 1995 film Apollo 13 featuring an original score composed, conducted and orchestrated by James Horner, and performed by the Hollywood Studio Symphony. The soundtrack was released on June 27, 1995, by MCA Records that compiled seven tracks of score, eight period songs used in the film, and seven tracks of dialogue by the actors at a running time of nearly 78 minutes.

The score was a critical success and was nominated for Best Original Dramatic Score at the 68th Academy Awards, along with Horner's other score for Braveheart, released at the same year. In 2019, the full score was released by Intrada Records at an expanded edition along with the original release, and remastered editions of Horner's full score.

== Track listing ==
All music is composed by James Horner, except where noted.

Apollo 13: Original Motion Picture Soundtrack
No.	Title	Length
1.	"Main Title"	1:32
2.	"One Small Step"	0:42
3.	"Night Train" (performed by James Brown, written by Jimmy Forrest, Lewis Simpkins and Oscar Washington)	3:27
4.	"Groovin'" (performed by The Young Rascals)	2:26
5.	"Somebody to Love" (performed by Jefferson Airplane)	2:55
6.	"I Can See for Miles" (performed by The Who)	4:09
7.	"Purple Haze" (performed by The Jimi Hendrix Experience)	2:48
8.	"Launch Control"	3:28
9.	"All Systems Go/The Launch"	6:39
10.	"Welcome to Apollo 13"	0:38
11.	"Spirit in the Sky" (performed and written by Norman Greenbaum)	3:50
12.	"House Cleaning/Houston, We Have a Problem"	1:34
13.	"Master Alarm"	2:54
14.	"What's Going On?"	0:34
15.	"Into the L.E.M."	3:43
16.	"Out of Time/Shut Her Down"	2:20
17.	"The Darkside of the Moon" (performed by Annie Lennox)	5:09
18.	"Failure is Not an Option"	1:18
19.	"Honky Tonkin'" (performed and written by Hank Williams)	2:42
20.	"Blue Moon" (performed by The Mavericks, written by Richard Rodgers and Lorenz Hart)	4:09
21.	"Waiting for Disaster/A Privilege"	0:43
22.	"Re-Entry & Splashdown"	9:05
23.	"End Titles" (performed by Annie Lennox)	5:34

== Reception ==
Tom Demalon of AllMusic gave four out of five stars and wrote "The orchestrated score manages to capture the drama of the events in a manner that ranges from quietly stirring to sweepingly epic, with Eurythmic Annie Lennox adding her distinctive, ethereal vocal accompaniment to several of the cuts." A review from Filmtracks.com gave five-stars to the album ranking "easily among the best of the 1990s". Writing for Tracksounds, Christopher Coleman rated 9/10 to the album and summarised "This score obviously inspired David Kneupper's work for the Apollo/ Saturn V Exhibit and who could blame him. Horner's score, like the story of the Apollo 13 mission, has inspired countless and continues to inspire today."

Zanobard Reviews rated 9/10 to the album and commented "James Horner's score to Apollo 13 is nothing short of “out of this world”. His expert use of instrumentation and vocals make the score the perfect accompaniment to the film, and his near masterful use of tone and emotion is what gets the music to truly stand out from the crowd. The main theme is fantastic, setting an appropriately heroic and patriotic tone for the score while at the same time keeping up tension and drama when they are needed. I do feel that the motif is perhaps a tad overused at times, which makes its appearances at critical moments in the film somewhat less impactful than they should be, but honestly this is a nitpick more than anything else." Music critic Jonathan Broxton wrote "Apollo 13 reveals Horner's genius in both conception and execution, a score which inspires, rouses, yet also frightens us." James Southall of Movie Wave wrote "It is respectfully heroic and noble but still carries a real dramatic thrust and the emotional climax is wonderful. In the film, every note of the music is perfectly judged; away from it, a constant source of pleasure."

Sean Wilson of MFiles wrote "Horner really hit his peak in the mid-90s with scores such as Apollo 13. Titanic may have scooped the Oscar glory a couple of years later but this is arguably a far more accomplished work, having to bridge the dialogue heavy sections of the movie with graceful verve, and without reducing the film's narrative to the level of tawdry melodrama. In an outstanding year for film music, Horner's work on Apollo 13 soared with the best of them."

== Live performance ==
Four years after Horner's death in June 2015, the American Youth Symphony orchestra performed the entire score live to picture (along with the special screening of the film) at the Royce Hall in University of California, Los Angeles on November 16, 2019.

== Limited edition ==
On January 15, 2019, Intrada Records released the expanded edition of the score album, containing Horner's full score for the film.

Disc 1
No.	Title	Length
1.	"Main Title" (film version)	1:53
2.	"Lunar Dreams"	2:40
3.	"A Son's Worries And Simulator Crash"	4:37
4.	"Night Visitors"	1:08
5.	"All Systems Go – The Launch"	10:19
6.	"Docking"	2:26
7.	"Master Alarm" (film version)	3:31
8.	"Into The L.E.M." (film version)	5:10
9.	"The Dark Side Of The Moon"	5:18
10.	"Carbon Dioxide"	5:45
11.	"Manual Burn"	1:56
12.	"A War Story"	1:06
13.	"Four More Amps"	3:22
14.	"L.E.M. Jettison"	1:37
15.	"Re-Entry And Splashdown" (film version)	9:15
16.	"End Credits" (film version)	6:55
17.	"Marilyn's Nightmare"	0:58
18.	"Canister Explosion"	0:24
19.	"Reactant Valves"	1:09
20.	"Out Of Control"	1:08
21.	"Power Off"	0:57
22.	"A Square Peg"	3:49
23.	"Cosmic Connection"	0:44
Total length:		76:07

Disc 2
No.	Title	Length
1.	"Main Title"	2:40
2.	"Lunar Dreams"	2:41
3.	"All Systems Go – The Launch"	10:21
4.	"Docking"	2:26
5.	"Master Alarm"	3:06
6.	"Into the L.E.M"	5:10
7.	"The Dark Side Of The Moon"	5:17
8.	"Carbon Dioxide"	5:45
9.	"Manual Burn"	1:57
10.	"Four More Amps"	3:20
11.	"Re-Entry And Splashdown"	9:15
12.	"End Credits"	6:59
Total length:		58:57

== Personnel ==
Credits adapted from CD liner notes.

Album credits

- Music composed, conducted and orchestrated by – James Horner
- Performed by – The Hollywood Studio Symphony
- Music editor – Thomas Drescher
- Supervising music editor – Jim Henrikson
- Assistant music editor – Kristen Johnson
- Mixed by – Shawn Murphy
- Orchestrated by – Don Davis, Steve Bramson
- Orchestra contractor – Sandy de Crescent
- Music consultant – Joe Sikoryak
- Music co-ordinator – Frank K. DeWald
- Production co-ordinator (Universal Music Enterprises) – Sean Kennedy
- Soundtrack album co-ordinator (Universal Pictures) – Andy Kalyvas, Nikki Walsh
- Copyist – Robert Bornstein, Robert W. Joles, David A. Izzard, Emmett Estren, Jeffrey Hoyt Jones, Jon K. Marquart, Kendall Schmidt, Kirby Furlong, Laurie Robinson, Margaret J. Maryatt, Roy Wood, Steven Juliani, Victor Sagerquist
- Executive producer – Brian Grazer, Kathy Nelson, Ron Howard, Todd Halliwell
- Executive in charge of music (Universal Pictures) – Mike Knobloch
- Music business affairs (Universal Pictures) – Steven Griesemer, Tanya Perara
- Product manager (Universal Music Enterprises) – Gene Zacharewicz
- Production manager – Regina Fake
- Art direction – Kay Marshall
- Liner notes – John Takis

Performer credits

- Bass – Arni Egilsson, Bruce P. Morgenthaler, Charles Domanico, Drew D. Dembowski, Edward Meares, Nico C. Abondolo, Paul J. Zibits, Richard Feves, Steve Edelman, Susan A. Ranney, Timothy C. Barr
- Bassoon – John Steinmetz, Kenneth E. Munday, Michael R. O'Donovan, Patricia Kindel-Haimerl, Rose Corrigan
- Cello – J. Antony Cooke, Armen Ksajikian, Barbara George, Barbara Jane Hunter, Christine Ermacoff, Dane R. Little, David Low, David Speltz, Dennis Karmazyn, Douglas L. Davis, Earl Madison, John Walz, Matthew Cooker, Rowena Hammill, Sebastian Toettcher, Timothy E. Landauer, Todd Hemmenway
- Clarinet – Emily Bernstein, Gary S. Bovyer, Gary G. Gray, James M. Kanter, Michele Zukovsky
- Flute – David Shostac, James R. Walker, Louise M. Di Tullio, Sheridon W. Stokes
- French horn – Brian D. A. O'Connor, David A. Duke, James W. Thatcher, John A. Reynolds, Richard J. Todd, Steven B. Becknell, Todd L. Miller
- Harp – Gayle Levant, Jo Ann Turovsky
- Keyboards, synth – Ian R. Underwood, Michael Fisher, Ralph E. Grierson, Randy M. Kerber, Ronald Aston
- Oboe – Barbara Northcutt, Kathleen T. Robinson, Phillip Ayling, Thomas G. Boyd
- Percussion – Alan Estes, Robert J. Zimmitti, Dale L. Anderson, Donald J. Williams, Gregory Goodall, Jerry D. Williams, Peter Limonick, Thomas D. Raney
- Trombone – Alan L. Kaplan, Robert F. Sanders, Richard Nash, William C. Booth
- Trumpet – George Burnette Dillon, Warren H. Luening Jr., Timothy G. Morrison
- Tuba – James M. Self
- Viola – Brian Dembow, Carrie Holzman Little, Dan Lionel Neufeld, Donald McInnes, Janet Lakatos, Keith Greene, Linn Subotnick, Maria L. Newman, Marlow G. Fisher, Michael Nowak, Mihail Zinovyev, Miriam Dye, Pamela Goldsmith, Rick Gerding, Robin R. Ross Chineduh, Roland Kato, Scott Haupert, Steven A. Gordon, Victoria E. Miskolczy
- Violin – Alan H. Grunfeld, Anatoly Rosinsky, Arnold Belnick, Berj Garabedian, Bonnie J. Douglas, Bruce Dukov, Claudia Parducci, Clayton Haslop, David Ewart, Dimitrie Leivici, Endre Granat, Eun Sun Lee, Eun-Mee Ahn, Galina Golovin Zherdev, Gregory D. Moore, Haim Shtrum, Isabella Lippi, Jay Rosen, Julie Ann Gigante, Karen Jones, Katia K. Popov, Kenneth Yerke, Lily Ho Chen, Miran Haig Kojian, Patricia Johnson, Paul C. Shure, Polly H. Sweeney, Rachel Robinson, Rafael Rishik, Ralph Morrison III, Rene M. Mandel, Richard L. Altenbach, Robert L. Brosseau, Robin Olson, Roger D. Wilkie, Ronald Folsom, Sheldon Sanov, Sheryl Staples Centanni, Sid Page, Tamara L. Hatwan Chang
- Vocals – Annie Lennox

== Accolades ==
Year	Award	Category	Recipient	Result	Ref.
1996	Academy Awards	Best Original Dramatic Score	James Horner	Nominated	
1996	Chicago Film Critics Association	Best Original Score	James Horner	Nominated	
2019	International Film Music Critics Association	Best Archival Release of an Existing Score – Re-Release or Re-Recording	James Horner, Mike Matessino, Kay Marshall and John Takis	Nominated	
