= John LaBarbera =

American jazz musician

- Born: November 10, 1945 (age 80); Warsaw, New York, U.S.
- Genres: Jazz
- Instrument: Trumpet

John LaBarbera (born November 10, 1945) is an American trumpeter, composer and arranger who worked with the Buddy Rich Orchestra during the late 1960s.

== Early life ==
LaBarbera was born in Warsaw, New York, on November 10, 1945. His home town is Mount Morris, New York. He studied music with "his father and at Potsdam (New York) State Teachers College (1963-1965) and the Berklee School of Music (1965–67)".

== Later life and career ==
LaBarbera joined Buddy Rich's band in 1968, but moved to Buddy DeFranco's Glenn Miller Band later that year, before rejoining Rich in 1971 as his principal arranger. He started arranging when with DeFranco, and continued with Rich until Buddy's death in 1987.

"In the 1980s and 1990s he worked principally as a composer and an arranger, supplying new scores for college and high-school big bands and fulfilling commissions for films, television, and commercials". In the area of jazz education, he "directed jazz ensembles at Cornell University in Ithaca, New York, from 1988 to 1991 and then joined the faculty in the jazz studies program at the University of Louisville and is now retired as professor emeritus".

His On the Wild Side was nominated for a Best Large Jazz Ensemble Album Grammy award in 2004.
