= Estancia (Ginastera) =

Ballet by Alberto Ginastera

Estancia (Op. 8) is the second ballet composed by Argentinian composer Alberto Ginastera premiered in 1952 commissioned by American writer Lincoln Kirstein. Ginastera took inspiration for the ballet's plot from the epic Martin Fierro by Argentine writer José Hernández, incorporating the nationalist themes and language into his musical score. The ballet was created the same year the composer had made his acquaintance with American composer Aaron Copland. The ballet began its life as a four-part orchestral suite in 1941 before being turned in a one-act ballet.

The ballet form is approximately one-half hour in length and tells the story of the love between a boy living in the city and the daughter of a rancher. The girl finds the boy lacking in courage when compared to the gauchos. However, by the end of the ballet, he wins her over by outdancing the gauchos in a competition.

== History ==
Ginastera's ballet was a commissioned project by Kirstein for the American Ballet Caravan, with choreography ostensibly provided by Russian choreographer George Balanchine. The ballet company had involved themselves in another Western-inspired ballet at the time, Copland's Billy the Kid (1938). While on tour in Argentina with the company, Copland met Ginastera and a deep friendship ensued.

However, the ballet company disbanded in 1942, nullifying the opportunity for the ballet to be performed. Further, the onset of World War II stopped the project entirely and performance of the ballet would not occur until after the war in 1945. Kirstein had originally hoped to have the ballet performed as early as possible but the war effort and the company's dissolution stopped his plans.

As an interim solution, Ginastera extracted four dances from the ballet and created an orchestral suite for concert performance, with the final ("Malambo"), based on the Argentine dance style, being the most well-known of the four.

Ultimately, the work was premiered. In 1952, the Colon Theater Ballet held the ballet's official premiere, with choreography supplied by the Russian choreographer Michel Borovsky. The lead dance role was performed by Enrique Lommi who is said to have asked for simpler footwork as the orchestra had begun to drown his sounds out.

In 2010, the New York City Ballet reconceptualized the work. The work was choreographed by English choreographer Christopher Wheeldon with set design by Spanish architect Santiago Calatrava.

== Scenes ==
1. Dawn (El amanecer)
  - Introduction and Scene (Introducción y escena)
  - Little Dance (Pequeña danza)
2. Morning (La mañana)
  - Wheat Dance (Danza del trigo)
  - Farm Workers (Los trabajadores agrícolas)
  - The peons of the hacienda – Entrance of the little horses (Los peones de la hacienda – Entrada de los caballitos)
  - Villagers (Los puebleros)
3. Slow (El lento)
  - Sad Pampas (Triste pampeano)
  - Church (La doma, Rodeo)
  - Idyll at Twilight (Idilio en el crepúsculo)
4. Night (La noche)
5. Dawn
  - Scene (Escena)
  - Final Dance (Danza final, Malambo)

== Recordings ==
- Ginastera, A.: Panambi / Estancia (complete ballets) (Naxos, 2006)
