= George Zingali =

American choreographer (1951 – 1992)

George Michael Zingali (December 1, 1951 – March 6, 1992) was an American choreographer and drill designer for several top drum and bugle corps, including the 27th Lancers, The Cadets, the Star of Indiana, and the Blue Knights.

== Career ==
Zingali became well known within the marching arts community for his radical approach to drill design. During the early days of modern drum corps, drill was highly symmetrical and straightforward, reminiscent of actual military formations. Zingali broke tradition by incorporating curvilinear, asymmetrical designs that could enhance the musical selections of the given show concept, often inspired by modern artists. This brought a challenge where Zingali needed to connect large sets that differed greatly from each other through smaller drill movements. Because of this, Zingali became one of the first drill designers to give a large emphasis on transitions. This led to some of the most celebrated drill moves in the marching arts, such as the "Z-Pull" (a signature of The Cadets that was first performed in 1983) and—his final design before his death—the "Cross-to-Cross" (performed by the Star of Indiana in 1991).

In 1980, the 27th Lancers were invited to play at the opening and closing ceremonies of the Winter Olympics in Lake Placid. Through his role as visual designer for the 27th Lancers, Zingali was given wide berth to choreograph these parts of the Olympics. The color guard award given at the end of each Drum Corps International season is named in his honor.
