= Drum Corps Associates Open Class World Champions =

During Labor Day Weekend, Drum Corps Associates (DCA) Open Class corps compete to earn the title of DCA Open Class World Champion. The championships consist of 2 rounds (Prelims and Finals) held on 2 consecutive nights (the Saturday and Sunday nights of Labor Day weekend). All corps compete at Prelims, with the top 10 Open Class and top 4 Class A corps competing at Finals. The champion is determined by the overall high score in the Finals competition. There are also a number of caption awards (high brass, high percussion, high visual, etc.), though the process of determination for those awards has changed from year to year.

Only eleven corps have won at least one DCA title (including 2 ties):

- Reading Buccaneers – 17 titles
- Hawthorne Caballeros – 10 titles
- Bushwackers – 6 titles (1 tie)
- Long Island Sunrisers – 6 titles (1 tie)
- Empire Statesmen – 5 titles (1 tie)
- Syracuse Brigadiers – 5 titles (1 tie)
- Connecticut Hurricanes – 3 titles
- Skyliners – 3 titles
- Minnesota Brass – 1 title
- Westshoremen – 1 title
- Cadets2 – 1 title

As of the conclusion of the 2019 competitive season, the Buccaneers, Bushwackers, Caballeros, Hurricanes, Skyliners, and Sunrisers remain in active Open Class competition. The Cadets2, Minnesota Brass, Brigadiers, Empire Statesmen, and Westshoremen are inactive.

== 1965 ==
- Champion: Reading Buccaneers of Reading, Pennsylvania
- Repertoire:
  - Burke's Law
  - From This Moment On
  - Portrait of My Love
  - Maria
  - This Had Better Be The Night
  - El Cid
  - After You've Gone
  - Beyond the Sea
- Score: 84.50
- Location: Milford, Connecticut
- Venue: Jonathan Law Field
- Date: September 11

== 1966 ==
- Champion: New York Skyliners of New York, NY
- Repertoire:
  - Charlie Welch (from Mr. Wonderful)
  - Columbia the Gem of the Ocean (from Thousands Cheer)
  - That Old Black Magic (from Bus Stop)
  - Flight of the Bumblebee
  - Once in Love with Amy (from Where's Charley?)
  - Hava Nagila
  - Oklahoma (from Oklahoma!)
- Score: 84.53
- Location: Bridgeport, Connecticut
- Venue: JFK Stadium
- Date: September 4

== 1967 ==
- Champion: Connecticut Hurricanes of Derby, Connecticut
- Repertoire:
  - You Gotta Start Off Each Day With A Song
  - Just One Of Those Songs
  - Under the Double Eagle
  - National Emblem March
  - America I Love You
  - Rhapsody in Blue
  - Fiddler On the Roof
  - Return Of The Magnificent Seven
- Score: 85.583
- Location: Bridgeport, Connecticut
- Venue: JFK Stadium
- Date: September 3

== 1968 ==
- Champion: Reading Buccaneers of Reading, Pennsylvania
- Repertoire: Unavailable
- Score: 82.15
- Location: Rochester, New York
- Venue: Aquinas Stadium
- Date: September 1

== 1969 ==
- Champion: Connecticut Hurricanes of Derby, Connecticut
- Repertoire:
  - Queen of Sheba March
  - Hallelujah Chorus
  - Rhapsody in Blue
  - Walk on the Wild Side
  - Hang 'Em High
  - Magnificent Seven
  - Also Sprach Zarathustra (from 2001: A Space Odyssey)
- Score: 79.745
- Location: Rochester, New York
- Venue: Aquinas Stadium
- Date: August 31

== 1970 ==
- Champion: Hawthorne Caballeros of Hawthorne, New Jersey
- Repertoire:
  - Captain From Castile
  - Ted Meets Johnny
  - Sabre Dance
  - 1812 Overture
  - Samba de Orpheo
- Score: 82.775
- Location: Rochester, New York
- Venue: Aquinas Stadium
- Date: September 6

== 1971 ==
- Champion: New York Skyliners of New York, NY
- Repertoire:
  - NY Montage
  - Little Old New York (from Tenderloin)
  - Longest Day
  - Alabama Jubilee
  - Lucretia McEvil
  - Comes Love
  - Slaughter on 10th Avenue (from On Your Toes)
  - Little Old New York (from Tenderloin)
  - East Side-West Side Fanfare
- Score: 91.5
- Location: Rochester, New York
- Venue: Aquinas Stadium
- Date: September 5

== 1972 ==
- Champion: Hawthorne Caballeros of Hawthorne, New Jersey
- Repertoire:
  - El Gato Montes
  - Captain From Castile
  - Theme from Patton
  - Everybody's Everything
  - Sabre Dance
  - Flamenco Cha-Cha
  - Samba de Orpheo
- Score: 90.6
- Location: Jersey City, New Jersey
- Venue: Roosevelt Stadium
- Date: September 3

== 1973 ==
- Champion: Hawthorne Caballeros of Hawthorne, New Jersey
- Repertoire:
  - Man of La Mancha
  - South Rampart Street Parade
  - Everybody's Everything
  - Sabre Dance
  - Flamenco Cha-Cha
  - Harmonica Man
- Score: 89.85
- Location: Rochester, New York
- Venue: Aquinas Stadium
- Date: September 2

== 1974 ==
- Champion: Hawthorne Caballeros of Hawthorne, New Jersey
- Repertoire:
  - Man of La Mancha
  - Sweet Gypsy Rose
  - Soul Train
  - Mac Arthur Park
  - Flamenco Cha-Cha
  - Harmonica Man
- Score: 83.5
- Location: Rochester, New York
- Venue: Aquinas Stadium
- Date: September 1

== 1975 ==
- Champion: New York Skyliners of New York, NY
- Repertoire:
  - How Could You Believe Me When I Said I Loved You
  - Hymn to Victory (from Victory at Sea)
  - West Side Story Medley
  - The Elks' Parade
  - Give My Regards to Broadway (from Yankee Doodle Dandy)
  - East Side-West Side Fanfare
- Score: 91.28
- Location: Rochester, New York
- Venue: Holleder Memorial Stadium
- Date: August 31

== 1976 ==
- Champion: Hawthorne Caballeros of Hawthorne, New Jersey
- Repertoire:
  - Bully
  - Brazil (from The Gang's All Here)
  - Echano (from Children of Sanchez)
  - Flamenco Cha-Cha
  - Hill Where the Lord Hides
- Score: 92.5
- Location: Rochester, New York
- Venue: Holleder Memorial Stadium
- Date: September 5

== 1977 ==
- Champion: Long Island Sunrisers of Long Island, New York
- Repertoire:
  - English Folk Song Suite by Ralph Vaughan Williams
  - Spain
  - Ol' Man River (from Show Boat) by Jerome Kern
  - Eli's Coming by Hoyt Axton
  - Dance Of The Wind-Up Toys (drum solo) by Chuck Mangione
  - Evergreen (from A Star is Born) by Paul Williams
- Score: 94.15
- Location: Allentown, Pennsylvania
- Venue: J. Birney Crum Stadium
- Date: September 3

== 1978 ==
- Champion: Long Island Sunrisers of Rockland County, New York
- Repertoire:
  - English Folk Song Suite by Ralph Vaughan Williams
  - Malaga by Bill Holman (musician)
  - Farandole by Bizet, Georges
  - Evergreen (from A Star is Born) by Williams, Paul
- Score: 90.85
- Location: Allentown, Pennsylvania
- Venue: J. Birney Crum Stadium
- Date: September 3

== 1979 ==
- Champion: Reading Buccaneers of Reading, Pennsylvania
- Repertoire:
  - Russian Sailor's Dance (from The Red Poppy) by Gliere, Reinhold
  - Fantasy by Earth, Wind and Fire
  - El Gato Triste by Mangione, Chuck
  - Feels So Good by Mangione, Chuck
  - Sylvia by Dilibes
- Score: 90.5
- Location: Hershey, Pennsylvania
- Venue: Hershey Park Stadium
- Date: September 2

== 1980 ==
- Champion: Reading Buccaneers of Reading, Pennsylvania
- Repertoire:
  - The Sea Hawk by Korngold, Erik Wolfgang
  - Russian Sailor's Dance (from The Red Poppy) by Gliere, Reinhold
  - Spanish Dreams by Severinsen, Doc
  - Sambandrea Swing by Menza, Don
  - One Voice by Manilow, Barry
  - Sylvia by Dilibes
- Score: 91.3
- Location: Hershey, Pennsylvania
- Venue: Hershey Park Stadium
- Date: August 31

== 1981 ==
- Champion: Connecticut Hurricanes of Derby, Connecticut
- Repertoire:
  - Queen of Sheba March by Respighi, Ottorino
  - Swing, Swing, Swing (from 1941) by Williams, John
  - Salute to Freedom by Statham, Frank
  - Devil Went Down to Georgia by Daniels, Charlie
  - It's My Turn by Sondheim, Stephen
  - Magnificent Seven by Bernstein, Elmer
- Score: 89.65
- Location: Philadelphia, Pennsylvania
- Venue: Franklin Field
- Date: September 6

== 1982 ==
- Champion: Long Island Sunrisers of Rockland County, New York
- Repertoire:
  - God Save the Queen by Ives, Charles
  - English Suite for Military Band by Vaughan Williams, Ralph
  - Barnum's Revenge by Coleman, Cy
  - Tiger of San Pedro by La Barbera, John
  - Legend of the One-Eyed Sailor by Mangione, Chuck
  - Send in the Clowns (from A Little Night Music) by Sondheim, Stephen
  - Come Follow the Band (from Barnum) by Coleman, Cy
- Score: 89.85
- Location: Allentown, Pennsylvania
- Venue: J. Birney Crum Stadium
- Date: September 5

== 1983 ==
- Champion: Long Island Sunrisers of Rockland County, New York
- Repertoire:
  - Russian Meadowlands by Knipper, Lev
  - Alexander's Ragtime Band by Berlin, Irving
  - Legend of the One-Eyed Sailor by Mangione, Chuck
  - Peasant Dance by Hirschberg, David
  - Send in the Clowns (from A Little Night Music) by Sondheim, Stephen
  - Come Follow the Band (from Barnum) by Coleman, Cy
- Score: 91.45
- Location: Allentown, Pennsylvania
- Venue: J. Birney Crum Stadium
- Date: September 4

== 1984 ==
- Champion: Hawthorne Caballeros of Hawthorne, New Jersey
- Repertoire:
  - Concierto de Aranjuez by Rodrigo, Joaquin
  - Nothing But D. Best by Best, Denzel de Costa
  - Malaguena by Lecuona, Ernesto
  - Don't Cry for Me Argentina (from Evita)
- Score: 92.4
- Location: Allentown, Pennsylvania
- Venue: J. Birney Crum Stadium
- Date: September 3

== 1985 ==
- Champion: Hawthorne Caballeros of Hawthorne, New Jersey
- Repertoire:
  - Corre Nina by Purim, Flora
  - Upstart by Ellis, Don
  - Malaguena by Lecuona, Ernesto
  - L.A. Is My Lady by Jones, Quincy
  - Espana Cani by Marquina, Narro Pascual
- Score: 92.5
- Location: Allentown, Pennsylvania
- Venue: J. Birney Crum Stadium
- Date: September 1

== 1986 ==
- Champion: Bushwackers of Harrison, New Jersey
- Repertoire:
  - Santos by Bellson, Louis
  - Quensabe Los Suertas de Los Tontos (from Cuban Fire Suite) by Richards, Johnny
  - La Suerte de Los Tontos (from Cuban Fire Suite) by Richards, Johnny
  - Egyptian Danza by Di Meola, Al
  - Ayres Eyes
- Score: 92.45
- Location: Allentown, Pennsylvania
- Venue: J. Birney Crum Stadium
- Date: August 31

== 1987 ==
This championships were noted by rain so severe during Prelims that Final were cancelled (due to extensive damage to the grass field) and the standing Prelims stood as the Finals results

- Champion: Long Island Sunrisers of Rockland County, New York
- Repertoire:
  - Adventures on Earth (from E.T.) by Williams, John
  - Jupiter (from The Planets) by Holst, Gustav
- Score: 94.84
- Location: Allentown, Pennsylvania
- Venue: J. Birney Crum Stadium
- Date: September 6

== 1988 ==
- Champion: Bushwackers of Harrison, New Jersey / Long Island Sunrisers of Rockland County, New York
- Bushwackers Repertoire:
  - Pellet Suite by McDougal, Ian
  - Inner Crisis by Willis, Larry
  - Mira, Mira by Ferguson, Maynard
  - Out of Africa (from Congo) by Bergman, Marilyn
- Sunrisers Repertoire:
  - Savannah River Holiday by Nelson, Ron
  - Concerto in F by Gershwin, George
  - An American in Paris by Gershwin, George
- Score: 96.36
- Location: Hershey, Pennsylvania
- Venue: Unavailable
- Date: September 5

== 1989 ==
- Champion: Bushwackers of Harrison, New Jersey
- Repertoire:
  - Time Check by Menza, Donald
  - In Her Family by Metheny, Pat
  - No Pasaran by Schanzer, Jeffrey
  - Mira, Mira by Ferguson, Maynard
- Score: 95.1
- Location: Allentown, Pennsylvania
- Venue: J. Birney Crum Stadium
- Date: September 3

There was actually a tie with the Sunrisers both had a score of 95.00 and Bush was given an extra .1 due to caption placements.

== 1990 ==
- Champion: Bushwackers of Harrison, New Jersey
- Repertoire:
  - Prototype by Stephen Melilo
- Score: 96.9
- Location: Allentown, Pennsylvania
- Venue: J. Birney Crum Stadium
- Date: September 2

== 1991 ==
- Champion: Empire Statesmen of Rochester, New York
- Repertoire:
  - Begin the Beguine (from Night and Day) by Porter, Cole
  - Sophisticated Lady by Ellington, Duke
  - American Patrol by Miller, Glenn
  - Don't Sit Under The Apple Tree by Miller, Glenn
  - In the Mood by Miller, Glenn
  - America the Beautiful by Ward, Samuel A.
  - Battle Hymn of the Republic by Steffe, William
- Score: 96.7
- Location: Scranton, Pennsylvania
- Venue: Lackawanna County Stadium
- Date: September 1

== 1992 ==
- Champion: Bushwackers of Harrison, New Jersey
- Repertoire:
  - The Ballad of Sweeney Todd) by Sondheim, Stephen
  - My Friends (from Sweeney Todd) by Sondheim, Stephen
  - Worst Pies in London (from Sweeney Todd) by Sondheim, Stephen
  - History of the World
  - Epiphany (from Sweeney Todd) by Sondheim, Stephen
  - Nothin's Gonna Harm You (from Sweeney Todd) by Sondheim, Stephen
- Score: 96.7
- Location: Scranton, Pennsylvania
- Venue: Lackawanna County Stadium
- Date: September 6

== 1993 ==
- Champion: Bushwackers of Harrison, New Jersey
- Repertoire:
  - Sunday in the Park with George
    - Putting It Together (from Sunday in the Park with George) by Sondheim, Stephen
    - Color and Light (from Sunday in the Park with George) by Sondheim, Stephen
    - Sunday in the Park (from Sunday in the Park with George) by Sondheim, Stephen
    - Sunday by Sondheim, Stephen
- Score: 96.6
- Location: Scranton, Pennsylvania
- Venue: Lackawanna County Stadium
- Date: September 6

== 1994 ==
- Champion: Empire Statesmen of Rochester, New York
- Repertoire:
  - The Music of Frank Sinatra
    - Ol' Man River (from Show Boat) by Kern, Jerome
    - I've Got the World on a String (from I'll Get By) by Arlen, Harold
    - April in Paris (from The Helen Morgan Story) by Duke, Vernon
    - My Way by Anka, Paul
- Score: 96.0
- Location: Scranton, Pennsylvania
- Venue: Lackawanna County Stadium
- Date: September 3

== 1995 ==
- Champion: Hawthorne Caballeros of Hawthorne, New Jersey
- Repertoire:
  - Spanish Fantasies
    - Malaguena by Lecuona, Ernesto
    - Conquistador by Chattaway, Jay
    - Spanish Fantasy by Corea, Chick
    - Concierto de Aranjuez by Rodrigo, Joaquin
    - Espana Cani by Marquina, Narro Pascual
- Score: 97.7
- Location: Scranton, Pennsylvania
- Venue: Lackawanna County Stadium
- Date: September 3

== 1996 ==
- Champion: Westshoremen of Harrisburg, Pennsylvania
- Repertoire:
  - Suite for Westshore
    - Granada Smoothie
    - All the Things You Are
    - Explosion!
    - Marching Season
    - Carnival (from La Fiesta Mexicana)
    - Suite for Jazz Orchestra
    - Blues in the Night
- Score: 96.9
- Location: Rochester, New York
- Venue: Frontier Field
- Date: September 1

== 1997 ==
- Champion: Empire Statesmen of Rochester, New York / Syracuse Brigadiers of Syracuse, New York
- Empire Repertoire:
  - Miss Saigon
    - Overture
    - Heat is On in Saigon
    - Sun and Moon
    - Dragon
    - Fall of Saigon
- Brigadiers Repertoire:
  - Night and Day: A Tribute to Cole Porter
    - In the Still of the Night (from Night and Day)
    - Love for Sale (from Night and Day)
    - Night and Day
    - It's Alright With Me (from Can-Can)
- Score: 96.3
- Location: Allentown, Pennsylvania
- Venue: J. Birney Crum Stadium
- Date: August 31

== 1998 ==
- Champion: Empire Statesmen of Rochester, New York
- Repertoire:
  - West Side Story
    - Fanfare
    - The Jets
    - Maria
    - America
    - Cool
    - The Rumble
    - Somewhere
- Score: 97.9
- Location: Allentown, Pennsylvania
- Venue: J. Birney Crum Stadium
- Date: September 6

== 1999 ==
- Champion: Syracuse Brigadiers of Syracuse, New York
- Repertoire:
  - On the Town with Buddy and Mel
    - Channel One Suite by Reddie, Bill
    - Harlem Nocturne by Hagen, Earl
    - Mercy Mercy Mercy by Ochs, Michael
- Score: 97.5
- Location: Allentown, Pennsylvania
- Venue: J. Birney Crum Stadium
- Date: September 5

== 2000 ==
- Champion: Syracuse Brigadiers of Syracuse, New York
- Repertoire:
  - City Rhythms
    - Slaughter on 10th Avenue (from On Your Toes) by Rodgers, Richard
    - Ballet in Brass by Brown, Les; Schoen, Victor
    - Artistry in Rhythm by Kenton, Stan
    - Harlem Nocturne by Hagen, Earle
- Score: 98.0
- Location: Syracuse, New York
- Venue: P & C Stadium
- Date: September 3

== 2001 ==
- Champion: Syracuse Brigadiers of Syracuse, New York
- Repertoire:
  - Jazz Street, After Hours
    - Seven Year Itch by Newman, Alfred
    - Come Back to Me (from On A Clear Day You Can See Forever) by Lane, Burton
    - God Bless the Child by Herzog, Jr., Arthur; Holiday, Billy
    - Mac Arthur Park by Webb, Jimmy
- Score: 97.95
- Location: Syracuse, New York
- Venue: P & C Stadium
- Date: September 2

== 2002 ==
- Champion: Syracuse Brigadiers of Syracuse, New York
- Repertoire:
  - Picasso Sketchbook
    - Spanish Fantasy by Corea, Chick
    - Day Danse by Corea, Chick
    - Guaganco by Sandoval, Arturo
    - All Or Nothing At All by Porter, Cole
- Score: 98.6
- Location: Scranton, Pennsylvania
- Venue: Lackawanna County Stadium
- Date: September 1

== 2003 ==
- Champion: Hawthorne Caballeros of Hawthorne, New Jersey
- Repertoire:
  - El Toro Nuevo
    - El Toro Rojo by Poulan, Key
    - The Prayer by Bayer, Carol; Foster, David
    - El Toro Furioso by Poulan, Key
- Score: 97.375
- Location: Scranton, Pennsylvania
- Venue: Lackawanna County Stadium
- Date: August 31

== 2004 ==
- Champion: Empire Statesmen of Rochester, New York
- Repertoire:
  - Go Hollywood!
    - Prologue and Theme (from City of Angels) by Coleman, Cy
    - With Every Breath I Take (from City of Angels)
    - Funny (from City of Angels)
- Score: 96.513
- Location: Scranton, Pennsylvania
- Venue: Lackawanna County Stadium
- Date: September 5

== 2005 ==
- Champion: Reading Buccaneers of Reading, Pennsylvania
- Repertoire:
  - Variations in "B" – Music by Barber, Bartók, Bizet, and Britten
    - Farandole
    - Adagio for Strings
    - String Quartet #5 – Movement 4
    - A Young Person's Guide to the Orchestra
- Score: 98.45
- Location: Scranton, Pennsylvania
- Venue: Lackawanna County Stadium
- Date: September 4

== 2006 ==
- Champion: Reading Buccaneers of Reading, Pennsylvania
- Repertoire:
  - Exotic Impressions
    - Bolero
    - Capriccio Espagnol
    - Claire de Lune
    - Scheherazade
- Score: 97.238
- Location: Rochester, New York
- Venue: PAETEC Park
- Date: September 3

== 2007 ==
- Champion: Reading Buccaneers of Reading, Pennsylvania
- Repertoire:
  - Blue Era
    - New Era Dance
    - The Promise of Living
    - Malambo
    - Rhapsody in Blue
- Score: 98.313
- Location: Rochester, New York
- Venue: PAETEC Park
- Date: September 2

== 2008 ==
- Champion: Reading Buccaneers of Reading, Pennsylvania
- Repertoire:
  - The Pursuit of Joy
    - Canon in D
    - Abram's Pursuit
    - Nessun Dorma
    - Ode to Joy
- Score: 97.913
- Location: Rochester, New York
- Venue: PAETEC Park
- Date: August 31

== 2009 ==
- Champion: Reading Buccaneers of Reading, Pennsylvania
- Repertoire:
  - Demons & Angels
    - Dies Irae
    - A Simple Song
    - Ritual Fire Dance
    - Symphonia Resurrectus
- Score: 99.025
- Location: Rochester, New York
- Venue: PAETEC Park
- Date: September 6

== 2010 ==
- Champion: Reading Buccaneers of Reading, Pennsylvania
- Repertoire:
  - Rome MMX
    - Pines of the Appian Way (fourth Movement from Pines of Rome)
    - Games at the Circus Maximus (Movement I from Roman Festivals)
    - Adagio from Spartacus
    - The Epiphany (Movement IV from Roman Festivals)
- Score: 98.263
- Location: Rochester, New York
- Venue: PAETEC Park
- Date: September 6

== 2011 ==
- Champion: Minnesota Brass of St. Paul, Minnesota
- Repertoire:
  - Valhalla
    - Immigrant Song by Led Zeppelin
    - Children's Hour of Dream by Charles Mingus
    - Imagine by John Lennon
    - Ride of the Valkyries by Richard Wagner
- Score: 98.35
- Location: Rochester, New York
- Venue: Sahlen's Stadium
- Date: September 4

== 2012 ==
- Champion: Reading Buccaneers of Reading, Pennsylvania
- Repertoire:
  - The Black Symphony
    - Warm Colors by Mark Lortz
    - The Four Sections for Orchestra, Mvt. IV by Steve Reich
    - New World (from Dancer in the Dark) by Björk
    - 1812 Overture by Pyotr Ilyich Tchaikovsky
- Score: 99.03
- Location: Annapolis, Maryland
- Venue: Navy–Marine Corps Memorial Stadium
- Date: September 2

== 2013 ==
- Champion: Reading Buccaneers of Reading, Pennsylvania
- Repertoire:
  - Higher, Faster, Stronger
    - Symphony No. 11, Mvt IV by Dmitri Shostakovich
    - Original Composition by Mark Lortz
    - Chevaliers de Sangreal (from the film The Da Vinci Code) by Hans Zimmer
    - Danse Bacchanale (from the opera Samson and Delilah) by Camille Saint-Saëns
- Score: 98.43
- Location: Annapolis, Maryland
- Venue: Navy–Marine Corps Memorial Stadium
- Date: September 1

== 2014 ==
- Champion: Reading Buccaneers of Reading, Pennsylvania
- Repertoire:
  - Break On Through
    - Break On Through (To the Other Side) by The Doors
    - Fourth Ballet Suite by Dmitri Shostakovich
    - Orawa for String Orchestra by Wojciech Kilar
    - Heat of the Day by Pat Metheny
    - Original Composition by Mark Lortz, Johnny Trujillo, and Greg Tsalikis
- Score: 97.55
- Location: Rochester, New York
- Venue: Sahlen's Stadium
- Date: August 31

== 2015 ==
- Champion: Reading Buccaneers of Reading, Pennsylvania
- Repertoire:
  - Twist It
    - Pagliacci by Ruggero Leoncavallo
    - Palladio by Karl Jenkins
    - Moonlight Sonata by Ludwig van Beethoven
    - Going the Distance (from Rocky) by Bill Conti
    - William Tell Overture by Gioachino Rossini
- Score: 97.58
- Location: Rochester, New York
- Venue: Sahlen's Stadium
- Date: Sep 7

== 2016 ==
- Champion: Cadets2 of Allentown, Pennsylvania
- Repertoire:
  - Full Circle
    - The Heat of the Day by Pat Matheny
    - First Circle by Pat Matheny
    - Third Wind by Pat Matheny
    - Both Sides Now by Joni Mitchell
- Score: 97.95
- Location: Rochester, NY
- Venue: Capelli Sport Stadium
- Date: Sep 4

== 2017 ==
- Champion: Reading Buccaneers of Reading, Pennsylvania
- Repertoire:
  - Behind the Suit
- Score: 98.93
- Location: Rochester, NY
- Venue: Capelli Sport Stadium
- Date: Sep 3

== 2018 ==
- Champion: Reading Buccaneers of Reading, Pennsylvania
- Repertoire:
  - Here to There
- Score: 98.00
- Location: Williamsport, PA
- Venue: STA Stadium
- Date: Sep 2

== 2019 ==
- Champion: Reading Buccaneers of Reading, Pennsylvania
- Repertoire:
  - Dans Ma Chambre
    - "Benedictus" by Karl Jenkins
    - "Ruslan and Lyudmila Overture" by Mikhail Glinka
    - "Flashdance What a Feeling" by Irene Crane
    - "Bohemian Rhapsody" by Queen
- Score: 98.225
- Location: Williamsport, PA
- Venue: STA Stadium
- Date: Aug 31 (Prelims & Finals)
