= Kenton Clarke =

American entrepreneur (born 1951)

Kenton J. Clarke
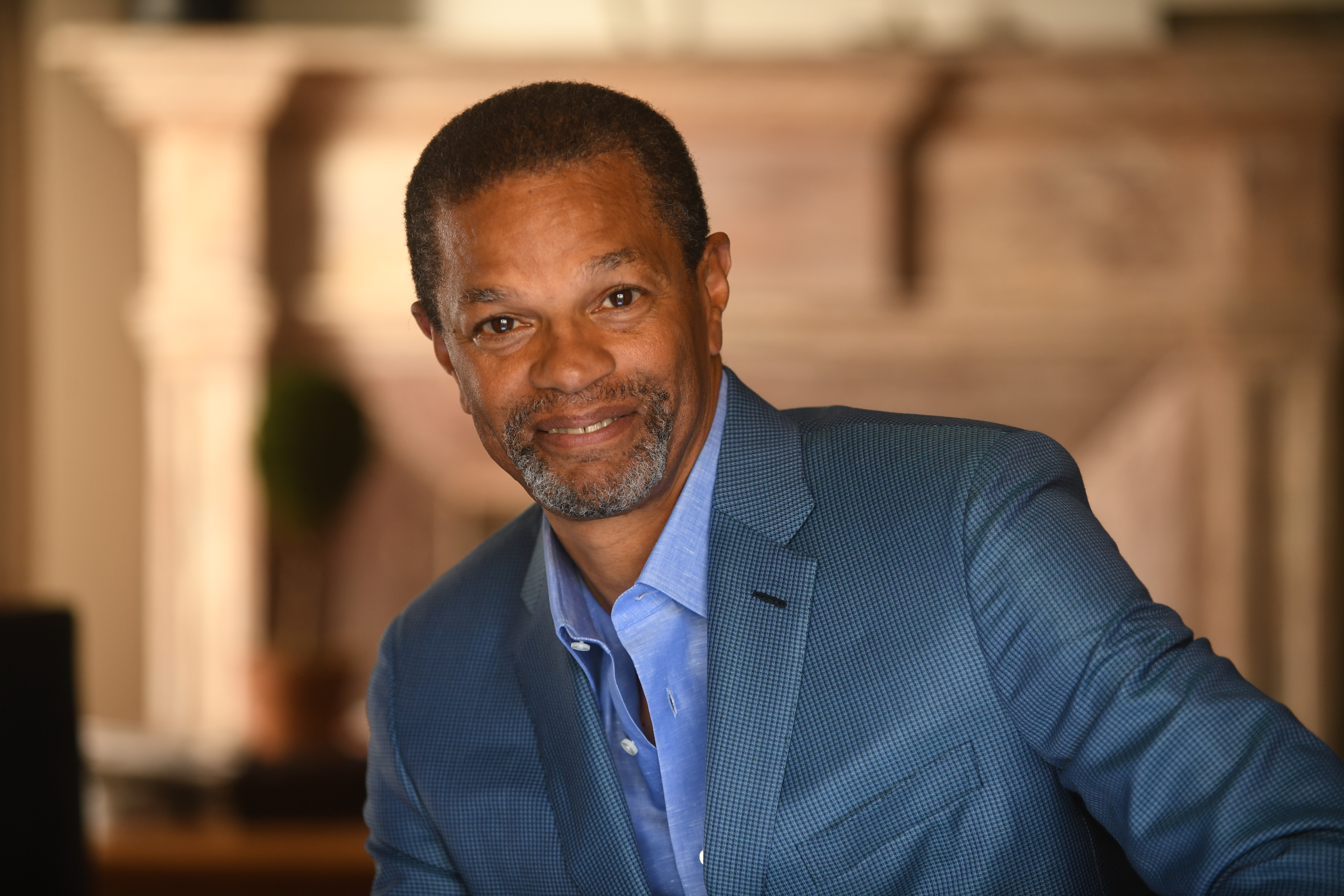
- Born: November 7, 1951 (age 74); Connecticut, United States
- Occupation: Entrepreneurial Businessman

Kenton J. Clarke (born November 7, 1951) is an American entrepreneur and musician. He graduated from Norwalk State Technical College in 1972 and the University of New Haven in 1979. He is the founder of Computer Consulting Associates International and Omnikal.

== Early life ==
Born in Bridgeport, CT, Clarke was one of 12 siblings. His father was Haywood D. Clarke Sr., WWII veteran and member of the United States Colored Troops and Clarke's grandfather, George Mason Clarke, owned and operated a rubbish removal company, one of the first to be owned by African-Americans. Clarke's first entrepreneurial venture began at the age of 17 when he formed Collegiate Painters, a house painting company that employed college students.

== Business career ==
Clarke became an early adopter of computer technology through his degree from Norwalk State Technical College, now known as Norwalk Community College. Clarke began his initial career in computer technology beginning at Sikorsky Aircraft (now Lockheed Martin) in their computer programming group.

=== Computer Consulting Associates International ===
Clarke earned his bachelor's degree in Operations Management from the University of New Haven. In 1980, Clarke founded CCAii based in Southport, CT. CCAii which grew to one of New England's largest information technology consulting firms.

=== Omnikal ===
Clarke formed Omnikal (formerly DiversityBusiness.com) in 1999. While providing a big data technology platform, Omnikal works to connect businesses for resources in a Business to Business matchmaking process. The Omnikal Business Summit brings small to medium-sized business owners together for connection, training and mentorship. Omnikal provides recognition to top US corporations for their efforts in diversity and inclusion through The Omni50. This award is a listing of the top 50 corporate and government buyers of products and services from an inclusive supply chain throughout the country. Omnikal provides a scholarship with Norwalk Community College addressing the lack of opportunities for African American males entering professional fields in technology. The Norwalk Community College African American STEM Scholarship is awarded annually to ten African American male students in a Science, Technology, Engineering or Mathematics (STEM) field currently enrolled or applying for admission to Norwalk Community College.

== Recognition ==
- 2006 'Top Black Entrepreneur' award from US Black Engineer & Information Technology magazine
- 2005 Distinguished Alumni award from the University of New Haven
- 2001 United States Small Business Administration, Regional Minority Small Business Person of the Year
- 2000 Outstanding Business Achievement of America's most successful African-American-Owned Companies, Black Enterprise, Magazine June 2000

== Music career ==
Clarke's music career began with his membership as a performer in the Drum and Bugle Corps organization in Fairfield, Connecticut, during his early school years. Clarke became a member of the brass section of his local corps and began playing the bugle at age eight. From 1960 until the late 1970s Clarke performed as a featured soloist on bugle for Connecticut and New York based Drum and Bugle Corps including; St. Raphael's Golden Buccaneers, Connecticut Hurricanes Drum and Bugle Corps where Clarke is listed as a Hurricane of Distinction, Connecticut Yankees and the New York Skyliners. Clarke was the 1970 All American National Individual Champion on bugle. In 2001, Clarke founded the Buglers Hall of Fame, and still serves as board chairman. Today, Clarke is an active member of the Alumni Corps in Bridgeport as well as the Stratford Community Concert Band who performs throughout Connecticut at community gatherings, fundraisers for many organizations. Most recently Clarke was inducted in 2015 to the World Drum Corps Hall of Fame and remains a member of the Buglers Hall of Fame alongside such notable award winners as Louis Armstrong.
