= Drum Corps Associates =

Governing drum corps body

- Merged into: Drum Corps International (2023)
- Founded: September 1963; 63 years ago
- Type: Performing arts governing body
- Location: South Orange, New Jersey, U.S
- President: John Carr
- Website: dcacorps.org

Drum Corps Associates (DCA) was a governing body for modern all-age and senior drum and bugle corps in North America. Its responsibilities included sanctioning competitions, certifying adjudicators, maintaining and enforcing rules of competition, and hosting an annual World Championship during Labor Day weekend. Historically, DCA members were referred to as "senior corps" in contrast to the "junior corps", who limit participants to a maximum 22 years of age. As DCA had no age restriction, the term "all-age corps" has come into common use.

On May 31, 2023, Drum Corps International and DCA announced a partnership to create an all-age class for the 2024 and 2025 competitive seasons. In August 2023, DCA announced that the all-age drum corps platform will fully exist and operate within DCI from 2024 onward. As such, 2023 was the final year of the Drum Corps Associates World Championships.

== History ==
In August 1963, Almo Sebastianelli, sponsor of the annual Parade of Champions drum corps competition, approached Henry Mayer, then-director of the New York Skyliners, to discuss problems affecting show sponsors and competing corps. Following their discussions, Sebastianelli and Mayer organized a meeting later that month, which was attended by representatives from the Archer-Epler Musketeers, Reading Buccaneers, Yankee Rebels, and the New York Skyliners. Five areas of concern were identified during the meeting:

- Conflicting contest dates.
- Inconsistent contest formats.
- Inconsistent adjudication.
- Uneven distribution prize money.
- Need to promote better relationships between competing corps.

At a second meeting held sometime in September 1963, by-laws for a new governing body were adopted, as well as the adoption of the name Drum Corps Associates. Mayer was elected the first DCA president. Charter members were: Reading Buccaneers, Connecticut Hurricanes, Interstatesmen, Archer-Epler Musketeers, Pittsburgh Rockets, Yankee Rebels, and the New York Skyliners.

DCA sanctioned one event in 1964, the 12th Annual Tournament of Drums in Waverly, New York. The first DCA World Championship was held in Milford, Connecticut on September 11, 1965. The Reading Buccaneers won the first of their 16 championship titles at this inaugural event.

Hawthorne Caballeros joined DCA in 1966, along with the Sunrisers, and Brigadiers. The Rochester Crusaders joined in 1967. Two decades later, in 1987, the number of corps competing in Open Class grew to 23. In 2008, twenty-four corps competed at World Championship, twelve in Open Class and Class A each.

Corps from Canada had been frequent competitors since DCA's founding, such as Les Metropolitains from Montreal, and Les Dynamiques from Buckingham, Quebec. The Kingston Grenadiers, from Toronto, competed in 2010. Yokohama Inspires, from Japan, competed in 2005. The last competitors from the United Kingdom were Kidsgrove Scouts from Kidsgrove in 2017, and Cadence from Guildford in 2018.

=== Past championship locations ===
Year	Venue
1965	Jonathan Law Field; Milford, Connecticut
1966–1967	John F. Kennedy Stadium; Bridgeport, Connecticut
1968–1971	Holleder Memorial Stadium; Rochester, New York
1972	Roosevelt Stadium; Jersey City, New Jersey
1973–1976	Holleder Memorial Stadium; Rochester, New York
1977–1978	J. Birney Crum Stadium; Allentown, Pennsylvania
1979–1980	Hershey Park Stadium; Hershey, Pennsylvania
1981	Franklin Field; Philadelphia, Pennsylvania
1982–1987	J. Birney Crum Stadium; Allentown, Pennsylvania
1988	Hershey Park Stadium; Hershey, Pennsylvania
1989–1990	J. Birney Crum Stadium; Allentown, Pennsylvania
1991–1995	Lackawanna County Stadium; Scranton, Pennsylvania
1996	Frontier Field; Rochester, New York
1997–1999	J. Birney Crum Stadium; Allentown, Pennsylvania
2000–2001	P & C Stadium; Syracuse, New York
2002–2005	Lackawanna County Stadium; Scranton, Pennsylvania
2006–2011	PAETEC Park; Rochester, New York
2012–2013	Navy–Marine Corps Memorial Stadium; Annapolis, Maryland
2014–2017	Rochester Rhinos Stadium; Rochester, New York
2018–2019	Williamsport Area High School; Williamsport, Pennsylvania
2020	Championships cancelled (Note: The 2020 DCA World Championships were cancelled in response to the coronavirus pandemic.)
2021	Virtual Championships
2022–2023	Rochester Community Sports Complex; Rochester, New York

== Classification and adjudication ==
DCA assigned all competing corps to four classes. No arrangements are made for corps from outside North America, as the same classification and adjudication applies to all competing corps. With the exception of mini-corps, all field corps performed in competition as one continuous flight, but scores and rankings were given by class.

=== Current Classes ===
World Class corps typically marched between 86 and 128 members who compete at the highest level.

Open Class corps typically marched between 65 and 85 members.

A Class (Note: A Class is often written as Class A on official materials, score recaps, and summaries.) corps were small, often young and developing groups, who typically marched between 24 and 64 members.

Mini-corps was a special class reserved for very small groups consisting of horns, and percussion or rhythm sections. These groups typically competed on a theater stage, and not on a football field, and were often no larger than twenty members. A Mini-corps championships was held the day before World Championship prelims.

==== Historical classes and divisions ====
DCA realigned its competitive classes in 1997, and again in 2001. In 2022, DCA realigned its competitive classes based on ensemble size—World, Open, and A classes.

1965–1997	1997–2001	2001–2021	2022–2023
Open Class	Open Class		World Class
Open Class	Open Class		Open Class
Open Class	A Class		
		Mini-corps	

=== Adjudication ===
DCA's Adjudication Manual was based on three broad categories, Visual, Music and Effect. Visual and Music categories were further subdivided into three reference criteria, or captions: one caption for each of a corps' sections, and two ensemble performance captions. Unlike other adjudication manuals, DCA's manual included captions for individual or ensemble analysis, or design or effect analysis.

The manual included definitions for appropriate, and achievement, in lieu of proficiency, or attempt. This vocabulary reflects the style of programming utilized by modern all-age corps. Audience entertainment and engagement are also important factors in adjudication as well. Prior to 2011, nine adjudicators were required for each competition, using a different manual. The "European Music Games" adjudication manual published by Drum Corps Europe (DCE) was adapted from the previous DCA format.

Category	Caption	+	Caption	=	Points
Music	Brass (20) / 2	+	Music Ensemble (20) / 2	=	30.00
Music	Percussion (20) / 2	+	Music Ensemble (20) / 2	=	30.00
Visual	Color Guard (20) / 2	+	Visual Ensemble (20) / 2	=	20.00
Effect	Music Effect (25)	+	Visual Effect (25)	=	50.00
			Subtotal		100.00
			Timing & Penalties		0.00
			Total		100.00

== Past champions ==
Below is a list of past champions organized by class. DCA realigned its championships classes in 1997 with the introduction of A Class, and again in 2000 with the introduction of Mini-corps into competition. In 2022, DCA realigned classes based on ensemble size which split DCA member corps between three new divisions—World, Open, and A classes.

At the 2022 World Championships, the Hurricanes won their fourth class championship: three championships in Open Class between 1967 and 1981, and a fourth as champions of the new Open Class. Also in 2022, the Buccaneers won World Class bringing their premier class championships to eighteen, and Fusion Core won their second championship in A Class.

2023 marked the final year of the Drum Corps Associates World Championships, in which the Buccaneers, Hurricanes, Rogues Hollow Regiment, and Freelancers took first in World Class, Open Class, A Class, and Mini-corps respectively.

Year	Open Class	—	—	—
1965 (1st)	Buccaneers (Pennsylvania)			
1966 (2nd)	Skyliners (Note: The Skyliners were then called the New York Skyliners, based in New York City.) (New York)			
1967 (3rd)	Hurricanes (Connecticut)			
1968 (4th)	Buccaneers ^{(2)}			
1969 (5th)	Hurricanes ^{(2)}			
1970 (6th)	Caballeros (New Jersey)			
1971 (7th)	Skyliners ^{(2)}			
1972 (8th)	Caballeros ^{(2)}			
1973 (9th)	Caballeros ^{(3)}			
1974 (10th)	Caballeros ^{(4)}			
1975 (11th)	Skyliners ^{(3)}			
1976 (12th)	Caballeros ^{(5)}			
1977 (13th)	Sunrisers (New York)			
1978 (14th)	Sunrisers ^{(2)}			
1979 (15th)	Buccaneers ^{(3)}			
1980 (16th)	Buccaneers ^{(4)}			
1981 (17th)	Hurricanes ^{(3)}			
1982 (18th)	Sunrisers ^{(3)}			
1983 (19th)	Sunrisers ^{(4)}			
1984 (20th)	Caballeros ^{(6)}			
1985 (21st)	Caballeros ^{(7)}			
1986 (22nd)	Bushwackers (New Jersey)			
1987 (23rd)	Sunrisers ^{(5)}			
1988 (24th)	Bushwackers ^{(2)} (tie); Sunrisers ^{(6)}			
1989 (25th)	Bushwackers ^{(3)}			
1990 (26th)	Bushwackers ^{(4)}			
1991 (27th)	Empire Statesmen (New York)			
1992 (28th)	Bushwackers ^{(5)}			
1993 (29th)	Bushwackers ^{(6)}			
1994 (30th)	Empire Statesmen ^{(2)}			
1995 (31st)	Caballeros ^{(8)}			
1996 (32nd)	Westshoremen (Pennsylvania)			
Year	Open Class	—	A Class	—
1997 (33rd)	Empire Statesmen ^{(3)} (tie); Brigadiers		Chieftains (Pennsylvania)	
1998 (34th)	Empire Statesmen ^{(4)}		Generations (Rhode Island) (tie); Heat Wave (Florida)	
1999 (35th)	Brigadiers ^{(2)}		Skyliners (Note: The Skyliners were based in New Jersey, beginning in 1997.) (New Jersey)	
Year	Open Class	—	A Class	Mini-corps
2000 (36th)	Brigadiers ^{(3)}		Generations ^{(2)}	Ghost Riders (New York)
2001 (37th)	Brigadiers ^{(4)}		CorpsVets (Note: CorpsVets are now known as Atlanta CV Drum & Bugle Corps.) (Georgia)	Renegades (Note: The Renegages mini-corps was composed of members from the Renegades Open Class corps from San Francisco, California.) (California)
2002 (38th)	Brigadiers ^{(5)}		Skyliners ^{(2)}	Erie Thunderbirds (Pennsylvania)
2003 (39th)	Caballeros ^{(9)}		Heat Wave ^{(2)}	Renegades ^{(2)}
2004 (40th)	Empire Statesmen ^{(5)}		Grenadiers (Ontario)	Golden Eagles (New York)
2005 (41st)	Buccaneers ^{(5)}		Chops, Inc. (Minnesota)	Minnesota Brass (Note: Minnesota Brass mini-corps was composed of members of Minnesota Brass Open Class from St. Paul, Minnesota. Also known as Minnie Brass.) (Minnesota)
2006 (42nd)	Buccaneers ^{(6)}		Govenaires (Minnesota)	Star United (Indiana)
2007 (43rd)	Buccaneers ^{(7)}		Sunrisers (Note: Long Island Sunrisers previously competed in Open Class.) (New York)	Star United ^{(2)}
2008 (44th)	Buccaneers ^{(8)}		Alliance (Georgia)	Star United ^{(3)}
2009 (45th)	Buccaneers ^{(9)}		Govenaires ^{(2)}	Star United ^{(4)}
2010 (46th)	Buccaneers ^{(10)}		Fusion Core (New Jersey)	Star United ^{(5)}
2011 (47th)	Minnesota Brass (Minnesota)		Govenaires ^{(3)}	Star United ^{(6)}
2012 (48th)	Buccaneers ^{(11)}		Carolina Gold (North Carolina)	Star United ^{(7)}
2013 (49th)	Buccaneers ^{(12)}		White Sabers (New York)	Ghost Riders ^{(2)}
2014 (50th)	Buccaneers ^{(13)}		White Sabers ^{(2)}	Star United ^{(8)}
2015 (51st)	Buccaneers ^{(14)}		Govenaires ^{(4)}	Star United ^{(9)}
2016 (52nd)	Cadets2 (Pennsylvania)		Cincinnati Tradition (Ohio)	Star United ^{(10)}
2017 (53rd)	Buccaneers ^{(15)}		Cincinnati Tradition ^{(2)}	Star United ^{(11)}
2018 (54th)	Buccaneers ^{(16)}		Carolina Gold ^{(2)}	Star United ^{(12)}
2019 (55th)	Buccaneers ^{(17)}		Carolina Gold ^{(3)}	Freelancers (California)
2020 (—)	Championships cancelled (Note: The 2020 DCA World Championships were cancelled in response to the coronavirus pandemic.)		Championships cancelled	
2021 (56th)	Caballeros ^{(10)}		Rogues Hollow Regiment (Ohio)	No champion
Year	World Class	Open Class	A Class	Mini-corps
2022 (57th)	Buccaneers ^{(18)}	Hurricanes (Note: The Hurricanes won three Open Class championships prior to the 2022 World–Open–A Class realignment.)	Fusion Core ^{(2)}	Star United ^{(13)}
2023 (58th)	Buccaneers ^{(19)}	Hurricanes ^{(2)}	Rogues Hollow Regiment ^{(2)}	Freelancers ^{(2)}

== See also ==
- Drum Corps Europe
- Drum Corps International
- Drum Corps Japan
- Drum Corps United Kingdom
- Winter Guard International
