= Reading Buccaneers Drum and Bugle Corps =

All-age drum and bugle corps based in Reading, Pennsylvania

The Reading Buccaneers
- Location: Reading, Pennsylvania, U.S.
- Division: DCI All-Age Class
- Founded: 1957; 69 years ago
- Director: Lou Tierno
- Championship titles: VFW: 1960, 1961, 1962; DCA: 1965, 1968, 1979, 1980, 2005, 2006, 2007, 2008, 2009, 2010, 2012, 2013, 2014, 2015, 2017, 2018, 2019, 2022, 2023; DCI All-Age: 2024, 2025, 2026

The Reading Buccaneers Drum and Bugle Corps is an all-age drum and bugle corps based in Reading, Pennsylvania. The corps was a charter member of Drum Corps Associates, and is now a member of the Drum Corps International All-Age Class.

== History ==
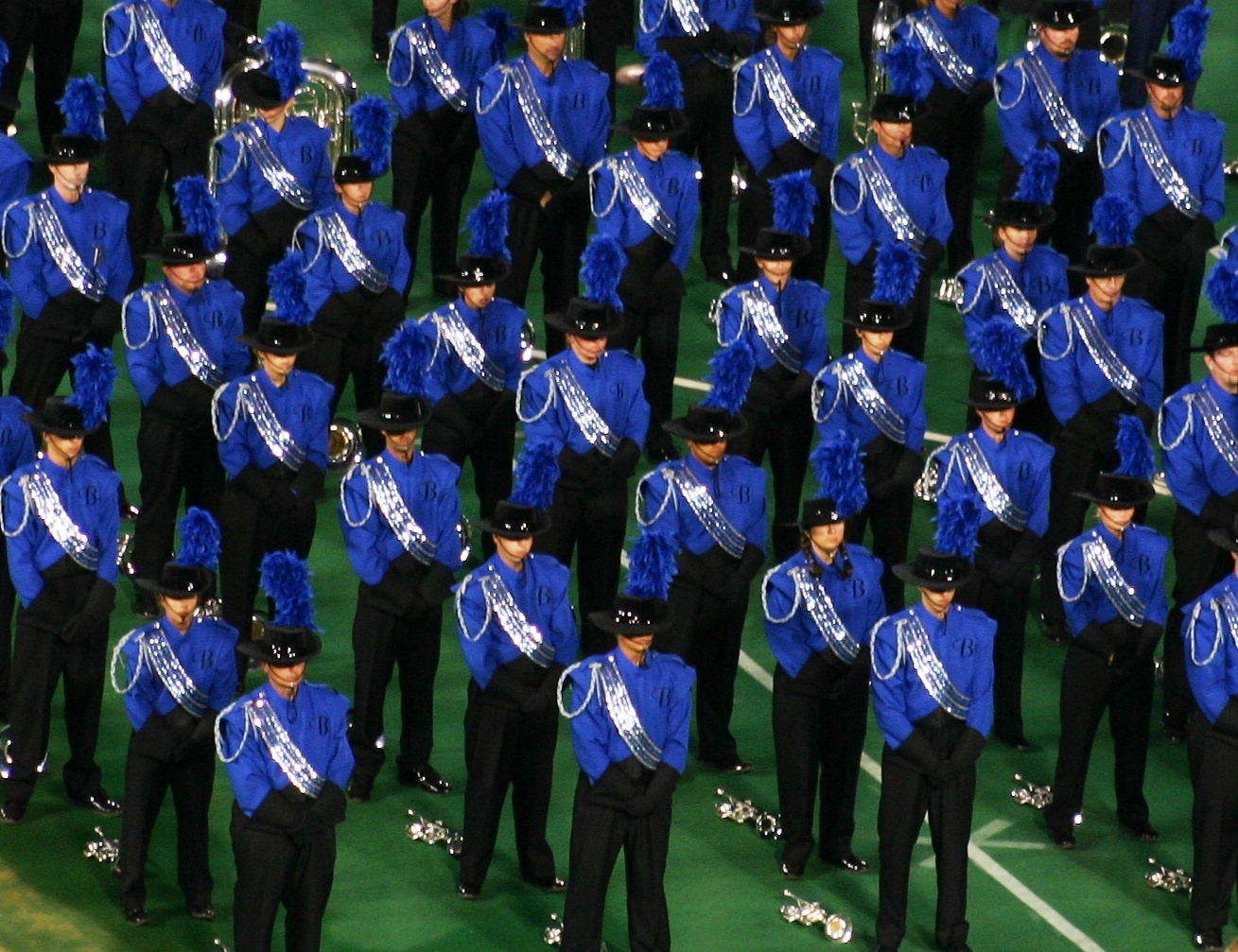
The Reading Buccaneers on retreat at the DCA World Finals in Scranton, Pennsylvania in 2005

The Reading Buccaneers drum and bugle corps was formed in August 1957 by bugler Bruce Englehart and three friends as a parade corps for World War II veterans. A field corps was formed in 1958, which competed in the VFW circuit. The Reading Buccaneers captured the VFW championship in 1960, 1961, and 1962.

In 1962, the corps was composed of a forty-two-member horn line, twelve-member drum section and an eighteen-member color guard. Its brass instrumentalists used Getzen twin-piston horns. Members of the ensemble wore "brilliant blue satin and black" buccaneer-style uniforms with silver trim and black "flat-crowned" hats with white ostrich feather plumes.

The Reading Buccaneers were the last drum and bugle corps to win the VFW championship as the award was retired in 1962. The Buccaneers were also the last to win the Drum Corps Associates World Championship in 2023.

=== The DCA Era (1965-2023) ===
In 1965, the Reading Buccaneers became a charter member of Drum Corps Associates. The Buccaneers won the first DCA Open Class World Champions in 1965. The ensemble has since repeated a championship placement eighteen times from 1968-2023. The corps won the first DCA World Class Championship title in 2022, as well as winning DCA's final World Class Championship title in 2023. The corps has also placed second nine times, and third seven times. It has missed being a DCA finalist only three times.

=== The DCI All-Age Era (2024-present) ===
In May of 2024, DCA and DCI announced a partnership to merge and create DCI All-Age, a new class under the Drum Corps International umbrella. The Buccaneers were one of the inaugural members of DCI All-Age and competed in the first DCI All-Age Championships at Lucas Oil Stadium on August 10, 2024, winning first place in the circuit. The Buccaneers, along with all of the other previously-DCA corps, continue to compete in the All-Age class.

== Show summary (1972–2026) ==
Key
Pale Blue indicates DCA Open (2023 and earlier) or World Class (post 2023) Finalist
Gold indicates DCA Open (2023 and earlier) or World Class (post 2023) Champion

Year	Theme	Repertoire	Score	Placement
1972		Blow the Man Down / Russian Sailor's Dance (from The Red Poppy) / Drunken Sailor / Military Suite in B Flat / Fancy Colours / Get It On / The Oracle Speaks / Something / Ebb Tide	88.650	3rd
1973		Russian Sailor's Dance (from The Red Poppy) / Theme from Shaft / Get It On / Verdi's Requiem / Something	85.800	2nd
1974		Firebird Suite / Theme from Shaft / Verdi's Requiem / Latin Boo Ga Loo / Finale (from Firebird Suite)	82.150	2nd
1975		Navy Hymn / Infernal Dance (from Firebird Suite) / La Fiesta / Mambotabo / Latin Boo Ga Loo / Finale (from Firebird Suite) / Blue Birdland	89.550	3rd
1976		Fanfare / Meadowland / Call to Danger / La Fiesta / Drunken Sailor / Bellavia / Russian Sailor's Dance (from The Red Poppy) / Ebb Tide	86.700	2nd
1977		The Coronation Scene / What I Did For Love (from A Chorus Line) / Don't Let the Sun Go Down on Me / Another Star / Finale	91.550	3rd
1978		Dance of the Tumblers / Feels So Good / El Gato Triste / Another Star / Finale	79.700	7th
1979		Russian Sailor's Dance (from The Red Poppy) / Fantasy / El Gato Triste / Feels So Good / Procession of Bacchus (from Sylvia)	90.500	1st
1980		The Sea Hawk / Russian Sailor's Dance (from The Red Poppy) / Spanish Dreams / Sambandrea Swing / One Voice / Procession of Bacchus (from Sylvia)	91.300	1st
1981		En Sueno / Star / Sambandrea Swing / Sometimes When We Touch / Procession of Bacchus (from Sylvia)	88.400	3rd
1982		En Sueno / Ballet in Brass / Let Me Try Again	83.150	6th
1983		Russian Sailor's Dance (from The Red Poppy) / March of the Boyars / Sunrise Lady / Let Me Try Again / Russian Sailor's Dance (from The Red Poppy)	82.650	5th
1984		Wind Machine / Central Park / The Captain's Journey / The Rainmaker	91.950	2nd
1985		Wind Machine / Jeannine / The Ancient / The Rainmaker / After You	91.900	2nd
1986		Route 66 / Nutville / Magnum Opus: Man Overboard / Sunrise Lady / After You	87.550	4th
1987		Symphonic Metamorphosis / Cuban Overture / We Are The Reason / Procession of Bacchus (from Sylvia)	92.300	5th
1988	A Russian Celebration	Symphony No. 5	79.940	10th
1989		Peleliu / Guadalcanal March (from Victory at Sea) / Victory at Sea	78.700	10th
1990	Batman	Batman Theme (from Batman) / Rooftop (from Batman) / Descent into Mystery (from Batman) / Return of the Rainmaker / Pie Jesu (from Requiem) / Batman Theme Reprise (from Batman)	92.200	7th
1991		Marche Slav / Firewatch / Dr. Macumba / Anything but Lonely (from Aspects of Love) / Russian Easter Overture	82.300	8th
1992		Cherokee / Englishman in New York / Moondance / Sambandrea Swing / You Can't Fall Up (You Just Fall Down) Narro	86.600	9th
1993		You're Still A Young Man / What is Hip / The Skunk, The Goose, And The Fly / You Can't Fall Up (You Just Fall Down)	84.800	11th
1994	The Music of "Hook"	Remembering Childhood (from Hook) / Prologue (from Hook) / Banning Back Home (from Hook) / You Are the Pan (from Hook) / The Ultimate War (from Hook)	79.600	11th
1995		En Sueno / Oriental (from 12 Danzas Españolas) / Canto del Viento / Navy Hymn / Russian Sailor's Dance (from The Red Poppy)	77.500	11th
1996		Russian Hymn / Hook / Jurassic Park / Asteroid Belt / E. T. Theme (from E.T.)	82.400	10th
1997		Hunt for Red October / Meadowland / Polovetsian Dances / Firebird Suite	83.400	9th
1998	A Russian Celebration	Festive Overture / Gopak / Russian Christmas Music	93.500	4th
1999	Winter Dreams	Russian Christmas Music / 4th Movement (from Symphony No. 1) / The Pine Forest (from The Nutcracker) / Russian Christmas Music	95.800	2nd
2000	Holst: The Planets	Jupiter (from The Planets) / Venus (from The Planets) / Mercury (from The Planets) / Mars (from The Planets) / Jupiter (from The Planets)	95.100	3rd
2001	Portraits of Bernstein	On The Waterfront / Slava / Make Our Garden grow (from Candide) / Overture (from Candide)	97.850	2nd
2002	Anthems of Freedom	Star Spangled Overture / Appalachian Spring / Flag of Stars	95.550	3rd
2003	The Sea: Beauty, Power, Serenity & War	Songs of Sailor and Sea / Navy Hymn / Drunken Sailor / Blow the Man Down / The Sea Treaders	92.150	5th
2004	Innovations! The Passions of Shostakovich	Festive Overture / Fire Of Eternal Glory / Symphony No. 10 / Symphony No. 5	95.450	3rd
2005	Variations in "B" - Music by Barber, Bartok, Bizet and Britten	Farandole (from L'Arlesienne) / Adagio For Strings / String Quartet No. 4 / A Young Person's Guide To The Orchestra	98.450	1st
2006	Exotic Impressions	Bolero / Capriccio Espagnol / Clair de Lune (from Suite Bergamasque) / Scheherezade	97.238	1st
2007	Blue Era	New Era Dance / The Promise of Living (from The Tender Land) / Danza Final(Malambo)(from Estancia) / Rhapsody in Blue	98.313	1st
2008	The Pursuit of Joy	Canon in D / Abram's Pursuit / Nessun Dorma (from Turandot) / Symphony No. 9 in D Minor, Op. 125 (from Ode to Joy)	97.913	1st
2009	Demons and Angels	Dies Irae (from Days of Wrath) / Ritual Fire Dance / A Simple Song (from Bernstein's Mass) / Symphonia Resurrectus (from Easter Symphony)	99.025	1st
2010	Rome MMX	Pines of the Appian Way (from Pines of Rome) / Games at the Circus Maximus (Movement I from Roman Festivals) / Adagio from Spartacus / The Epiphany (Movement IV from Roman Festivals)	98.263	1st
2011	A Dancer's Dream	The Chairman Dances / Danzon No. 2 / Swan Lake / Mambo (from West Side Story)	97.450	2nd
2012	The Black Symphony	Warm Colors / The Four Sections for Orchestra, Mvt. IV / New World (from Dancer in the Dark) / 1812 Overture	99.030	1st
2013	HIGHER, Faster, Stronger	Symphony No. 11, Mvt 4 / Original Composition / Chevaliers de Sangreal (from The DaVinci Code) / Danse Bacchanale from Samson and Delilah	98.430	1st
2014	Break On Through	Break on Through (To the Other Side) / Fourth Ballet Suite / Orawa for Orchestra / Heat of the Day / Original	97.550	1st
2015	Twist-It	Pagliacci / Palladio / Moonlight Sonata / Going the Distance (from Rocky) / William Tell Overture	97.580	1st
2016	ConZENtric - Mind, Body, Soul	Gabriel's Oboe (from The Mission) / Equus / Impressions of Japan	97.250	2nd
2017	Behind the Suit	Man of Steel / Metropolis Symphony Mvmnt 1 (Lex) / Andante Tranquillo; Symphony No. 1 / Into the New / Einleitung, oder Sonnenaufgang (from Also sprach Zarathustra)	98.930	1st
2018	Here to There	Hummingbird / Hunting Wabbits / La Danse Macabre / So Far Away / Symphony No. 4 / Original Music	98.000	1st
2019	Dans Ma Chambre	Ruslan and Ludmilla Overture / What a Feeling / Bohemian Rhapsody / Benedictus (from The Armed Man) / A Mass for Peace / Original Music	98.225	1st
2020	Season cancelled due to COVID-19 pandemic			
2021	Corps inactive			
2022	Altered: Ego; Rhapsody on a Theme of Paganini / Serenada Schizophrana / Smells Like Teen Spirit / Shofukan / Spiriti		96.725	1st Place; DCA; Champion
2023	Can't Stop Won't Stop; Equilibrium / Backlash / What Could Have Been		99.000	1st Place; DCA; Champion
2024	Hat Trick: The Art of Three; Philharmonia Fantastique / The Hymn of Acxiom / Chorale VI (Sol Fa)		95.925	1st Place; All-Age; Champion
2025	On Display; Everything In Its Right Place / Original Music / Somebody's Watching Me / Symphony No. 10, Mvt. 2		97.525	1st Place; All-Age; Champion
2026	Simplexity; Original music / Goddess / Psychopomp		96.200	1st Place; All-Age; Champion
