= Bushwackers Drum and Bugle Corps =

Drum and bugle corps in New Jersey, US

The Bushwackers
- Location: Princeton, New Jersey
- Division: Open Class
- Founded: 1981
- Director: Jim Dugan
- Championship titles: DCA: 1986, 1988, 1989, 1990, 1992, 1993

The Bushwackers Drum and Bugle Corps is an all-age drum and bugle corps that competes in the Drum Corps Associates circuit, It was founded in 1981 in Harrison, New Jersey. The corps is based in Princeton, New Jersey, and is a 501(c)(3) not-for-profit organization. The corps has won the Drum Corps Associates Open Class World Champions six times, and the corps' percussion section is the only one in either junior or senior corps to ever win six straight High Percussion Awards at Championships: 1986, 1987, 1988, 1989, 1990, 1991.

== History ==
The Bushwackers Drum and Bugle Corps was formed as a parade corps in 1981 with a field corps forming in 1982. They were once located in Harrison, New Jersey. During their first year of competition, The Bushwackers were able to make DCA finals in 8th place. In 1983, the corps was very competitive and ended the season with a fifth-place showing. The corps continued to grow until 1986, with a brand new staff, The Bushwackers captured their first DCA title. This placed The Bushwackers in the upper echelon of DCA corps. The Bushwackers would go on to win the DCA twice more before the end of the decade. In the 1990s, The Bushwackers continued their championship ways, going on to take DCA’s top spot again in 1990, 1992, and 1993. The corps has been a top-ten finalist of DCA in 35 of its 38 years. In 2013 the corps made its television debut on The Daily Show. In 2014 the Bushwackers performed as the opening act at the Special Olympics USA closing ceremony. In 2017, the corps collaborated with ASPIRA of Pennsylvania to establish the Bushwackers Academy, an educational organization.

== Show summary (1982–2026) ==
Key
Goldenrod background indicates DCA Open Class Champion
Blue background indicates DCA Open Class Finalist

| Year | Repertoire | Score | Placement |
|---|---|---|---|
| 1982 | Clash of Titans by Laurence Rosenthal / Fish Legs by Walter Murphey / Mickey Mouse by Frank Churchill / That Cat is High by J.M. Williams / Snowbird Fantasy by Robert James / Chariots of Fire by Vangelis | 70.550 | 8th Place; Open Class; Finalist |
| 1983 | Cleopatra's Asp by Doc Severinsen / Emerald Eyes by Louis Alter / Egyptian Danza by Al Di Meola / Quensabe Los Suertas de Los Tontos (from Cuban Fire Suite) by Johnny Richards / La Suerte de Los Tontos (from Cuban Fire Suite) by Johnny Richards / Chariots of Fire by Vangelis | 82.650 | 5th Place; Open Class; Finalist |
| 1984 | Santos by Louie Bellson and Remo Palmier / Quensabe Los Suertas de Los Tontos (from Cuban Fire Suite) by Johnny Richards / La Suerte de Los Tontos (from Cuban Fire Suite) by Johnny Richards / Egyptian Danza by Al Di Meola / I'll Be There by Berry Gordy, Hal Davis, and Willie Hutch / Thriller by Rod Temperton | 89.000 | 3rd Place; Open Class; Finalist |
| 1985 | The Epic by / The First Circle / Supertonic Suite All by the Pat Metheny Group | 86.550 | 4th Place; Open Class; Finalist |
| 1986 | Santos by Louie Bellson and Remo Palmier / Quensabe Los Suertas de Los Tontos (from Cuban Fire Suite) by Johnny Richards / La Suerte de Los Tontos (from Cuban Fire Suite) by Johnny Richards / Egyptian Danza by Al Di Meola / Ayres Eyes by Author Unknown | 92.450 | 1st Place; Open Class; Champion |
| 1987 | Pellet Suite by Ian McDougal / Marguerite by Sammy Nestico / Corner Pocket by Freddie Green / Ayres Eyes by Author Unknown | 92.960 | 3rd Place; Open Class; Finalist |
| 1988 | Pellet Suite by Ian McDougal / Inner Crisis by Larry Willis / Mira, Mira by Matt Harris / Out of Africa (from Congo) by Marilyn Bergman | 96.360 | 1st Place; Open Class; Champion |
| 1989 | Time Check by Donald Menza / In Her Family by Pat Metheny / No Pasaran by Jeffrey Schanzer / Mira, Mira by Matt Harris | 95.100 | 1st Place; Open Class; Champion |
| 1990 | Prototype; Prototype by Steve Melillo | 96.900 | 1st Place; Open Class; Champion |
| 1991 | Son of Storm; Son of Storm by Steve Melillo | 94.000 | 3rd Place; Open Class; Finalist |
| 1992 | Sweeney Todd; History of the World / The Ballad of Sweeney Todd / My Friends (from Sweeney Todd) / Worst Pies in London (from Sweeney Todd) / Epiphany (from Sweeney Todd) / Nothin' Gonna Harm You (All Sweeney Todd Music by Stephen Sondheim) | 96.700 | 1st Place; Open Class; Champion |
| 1993 | Sunday in the Park with George; Putting it Together (from Sunday in the Park with George) / Color and Light (from Sunday in the Park with George) / Sunday in the Park (from Sunday in the Park with George) / Sunday (All by Stephen Sondheim) | 96.600 | 1st Place; Open Class; Champion |
| 1994 | A Nightmare Before Christmas; What's This? / This is Halloween / Making Christmas / Kidnap the Sandy Claws / Sally's Song / What's This Reprise (All from the Nightmare Before Christmas by Danny Elfman) | 94.200 | 3rd Place; Open Class; Finalist |
| 1995 | A Symphony For Drum Corps; Mathis der Maler by Paul Hindemith / Age of Anxiety by Leonard Bernstein | 93.600 | 4th Place; Open Class; Finalist |
| 1996 | Sunset Boulevard; As if We Never Said Goodbye / Let's Have Lunch / The Car Chase / With One Look; All from Sunset Boulevard by Andrew Lloyd Webber | 91.500 | 4th Place; Open Class; Finalist |
| 1997 | El Congo Valiente (from Cuban Fire Suite) by Johnny Richards / Verde Luz by Caban Vale Antonio / Festival de Ritmo by Dave Weckl / A Mis Abuelos by Arturo Sandoval | 89.600 | 5th Place; Open Class; Finalist |
| 1998 | Jeckyll & Hyde; This is the Moment / Facade / Murder, Murder / Transformation / Alive / Take me as I Am; All from Jeckyll & Hyde by Frank Wildhorn & Leslie Bricusse | 85.200 | 8th Place; Open Class; Finalist |
| 1999 | Sondheim Snapshots; Overture (from Merrily We Roll Again) / Next (from Pacific Overtures) / Pretty Woman (from Sweeney Todd) / Putting it Together (from Sunday in the Park with George) (All by Stephen Sondheim) | 87.800 | 7th Place; Open Class; Finalist |
| 2000 | Music from the Dark Side; The Duel of Fates (from the Phantom Menace) / The Battle (from A New Hope) / Battle in the Snow (from The Empire Strikes Back) / The Crash (from The Return of the Jedi) / The War, Ewok Battle (from The Return of the Jedi) / The End (from the Phantom Menace) (all by John Williams) | 82.100 | 10th Place; Open Class; Finalist |
| 2001 | The Raging River; Into the Raging River by Steven Reineke / On the Waterfront by Leonard Bernstein | 92.400 | 5th Place; Open Class; Finalist |
| 2002 | The Myths of Fire; Inferno (from Divine Comedy) by Robert W. Smith / Vesuvius by Frank Tilcheli / Firebird Suite by Igor Stravinsky | 91.100 | 7th Place; Open Class; Finalist |
| 2003 | Journey to the Moon; Twelve Seconds to the Moon by Robert W. Smith / Star Trek: First Contact by Jerry Goldsmith / To Tame the Perilous Skies by David Holsinger | 91.038 | 7th Place; Open Class; Finalist |
| 2004 | Early American Landscapes; Symphony No. 9 (from The New World) by Antoin Dvorak / Amber Waves by Martin Gould / William Tell Overture by Gioachino Rossini | 88.638 | 8th Place; Open Class; Finalist |
| 2005 | Russian Winter Portraits; Russian and Ludmilla by Mikhail Glinka / Dance of the Tumblers by Nikolai Rimsky-Korsakov / Romeo and Juliet / 1812 Overture (Both by Peter Ilych Tchaikovsky) | 94.738 | 3rd Place; Open Class; Finalist |
| 2006 | Stages: A 25th Stages Anniversary Celebration; Fanfare for the New by Hugo Montenegro / The Perfect Year (from Sunset Boulevard) by Andrew Lloyd Webster / Rocky Point Holiday by Ron Nelson | 95.638 | 3rd Place; Open Class; Finalist |
| 2007 | Around the Town | 94.575 | 4th Place; Open Class; Finalist |
| 2008 | Gypsodic! | 93.425 | 6th Place; Open Class; Finalist |
| 2009 | Scenes from a Psychotic Circus; Parade of Characters / Circus Normalus / Death Defying Feats / Freak Show / Three Ring Psychotic Circus (all from Scenes from a Psychotic Circus by Key Poulan) | 88.963 | 9th Place; Open Class; Finalist |
| 2010 | Voodoo; Origins / Rituals / Gris-gris / Black Magic; All from Voodoo by Key Poulan | 86.763 | 9th Place; Open Class; Finalist |
| 2011 | A New Beginning; First Climb / Rest at High Camp / Second Climb and Avalanche / To the Summit (all from Everest by Key Poulan, Paul Rennick, and Sandra Rennick) | 79.800 | 11th Place |
| 2012 | American Roots; Scarborough Fair (Traditional) / Chester by William Billings / Shenandoah (Traditional) | 80.200 | 11th Place |
| 2013 | WE ARE; Intro by Dennis Argul / I am the Doctor (from Doctor Who) by Murray Gold / Some Nights by FUN / Tonight Tonight by Smashing Pumpkins | 87.430 | 8th Place; Open Class; Finalist |
| 2014 | The Resistants; Supremacy by Muse / Blowin' in the Wind by Bob Dylan / Knights of Cydonia by Muse / Symphonic Metamorphosis by Paul Hindemith | 89.800 | 7th Place; Open Class; Finalist |
| 2015 | Industrial (r)Evolution; Industrial Evolution, The Factory & Wild Ride (by Robert W. Smith) / Tempered Steel by Charles Rochester Young / Enigma Variations by Edward Elgar | 82.300 | 12th Place |
| 2016 | Piano Forte; Piano Concerto No. 1 by Keith Emerson / Selection by Claude Debussy / Selection by Billy Joel | 85.280 | 9th Place; Open Class; Finalist |
| 2017 | Where We Belong; Music from The Wizard of Oz by Harold Arlen & Yip Harburg / Creep by Radiohead / Orawa by Wojciech Kilar / Blue Shades by Frank Ticheli | 89.830 | 8th Place; Open Class; Finalist |
| 2018 | Pablo; The Canyon by Philip Glass / Nature Boy by Eden Ahbez | 92.725 | 5th Place; Open Class; Finalist |
| 2019 | Diverge; Adagio for Strings by Samuel Barber / Fearful Symmetry by John Adams / Us and Them by Richard Wright / Land of Make Believe by Chuck Mangione / Libertango by Astor Piazzola | 91.625 | 5th Place; Open Class; Finalist |
| 2020 | Season cancelled due to the COVID-19 pandemic | | |
| 2021 | Reminiscor; Man in the Mirror by Michael Jackson / Children's Dance by Howard Hanson / Original Music / Reflections of My Life by Marmalade | 90.300 | 3rd Place; Open Class; Finalist |
| 2022 | Canyon; Fanfare For The Common Man / Horse With No Name / Hallelujah / Original Composition / Short Ride in a Fast Machine | 94.600 | 3rd Place; Open Class; Finalist |
| 2023 | Hollywood: A Walk in Their Shoes: A Tale of Tinseltown; Dedicated to The One I Love by The Mamas and the Papas / Paparazzi by Lady Gaga / Car Chase by Andrew Lloyd Webber / Original Music | 92.200 | 3rd Place; World Class; Finalist |
| 2024 | The Ride; Last Train Home by Pat Metheny / Let You Break My Heart Again by Laufey / The Great Locomotive Chase by Robert W. Smith / Home Sweet Home by Nikki Sixx & Tommy Lee | 92.625 | 3rd Place; World Class; Finalist |
| 2025 | Where Do We Begin? Caves by Cody Fry / Air Waltz by Oliver Davis / You and I by Stevie Wonder, arr Jacob Collier / Bucimis by The Swingles | 94.250 | 3rd Place; World Class; Finalist |
| 2026 | Hypnotic; Hypnosis Theme by Wax Tailor / Prelude and Rooftop from "Vertigo" by Bernard Hermann / Movement IV of "The Four Sections" by Steve Reich / Frolic from "Rabbit and Rogue" by Danny Elfman / I Put a Spell on You by Jay Hawkins | 92.625 | 4th Place; Finalist |
