= Empire Statesmen Drum and Bugle Corps =

American musical group

The Empire Statesmen
- Location: Rochester, New York
- Division: Open Class
- Founded: 1983
- Disbanded: 2013
- Director: David Bruni
- Championship titles: DCA: 1991, 1994, 1997, 1998, 2004

The Empire Statesmen Drum and Bugle Corps was an all-age or senior drum corps based in Rochester, New York, United States. Founded in 1983, they were the only all-age corps to place in the top four of the DCA finals for 24 years straight (1988–2011), including five first place finishes in that same span.

== History ==
The Empire Statesmen organization gave performances in over a dozen countries and on three continents. It was founded by the late Vincent Bruni. The Empire Statesmen Drum & Bugle Corps and the Empire Cadets were formerly known as The Little Americans. Many of the performers were from the Greater Rochester Area, located within the State of New York, and throughout the United States and Canada. The Empire Statesmen were a 501(c)(3) non-profit corporation.

=== DCA Championship ===
==== 1997 ====
The 1997 season featured music from the Broadway musical Miss Saigon. The Empire Statesmen tied for first place with the Syracuse Brigadiers at the DCA World Championships in Allentown, Pennsylvania with a final score of 97.300. The Statesmen were undefeated throughout the regular competition season, only being beaten in the Championship Preliminary competition the day before finals.

==== 1998 ====
The Empire Statesmen's 1998 program featured selections from the hit Broadway musical and film West Side Story. The Statesmen returned to Allentown, Pennsylvania and topped off an undefeated season with a first place score of 97.900 at the DCA World Championships.

==== 2004 ====
The Empire Statesmen's 2004 program featured songs from the musical City of Angels. With a final score of 96.513, the Statesmen won their 5th DCA Championship in Scranton, PA.

=== Inactivity ===
After the 2013 season, the Empire Statesmen played their final notes at DCA Finals in Annapolis, Maryland.
