= Minnesota Brass Drum and Bugle Corps =

Minnesota Brass
- Location: St. Paul, Minnesota
- Division: DCI All-Age Open (Formerly DCA Open Class)
- Founded: 1946
- Director: Jake Esterberg
- Championship titles: 2011

The Minnesota Brass Drum and Bugle Corps is an all-age drum and bugle corps based in St. Paul, Minnesota, United States, that competed in Drum Corps Associates (DCA) and currently competes in Drum Corps International (DCI). A consistent DCA Finalist, Minnesota Brass was the 2011 DCA Open Class World Champion. Since the COVID-19 pandemic, Minnesota Brass has performed as a member of the SoundSport division under Drum Corps International. It also sponsors several indoor groups that currently compete in Winter Guard International under the MBI designation.

== History ==
Minnesota Brass was founded in 1946 as the Cecil Kyle Legion Corps. Between the years of 1946 and 1968, the corps operated under the names of William Laidlaw Legion Corps, Laidlaw Toreadors, Grain Belt Diamonds, and Men of Laidlaw. In 1969, the organization became a self-supporting non-profit under the name of Brass, Inc. In 1980, the organization adopted the name Minnesota Brass, Inc.

Today, Minnesota Brass, Inc. is a non-profit performing arts organization based in St. Paul, Minnesota that operates five separate performing ensembles: Minnesota Brass, MBI Winter Guard, MBI Indoor Percussion, and MBI Winds.

The all-age drum and bugle corps is the largest and most well-known of the organization's ensembles. The corps performs under the name Minnesota Brass. The more formal Minnesota Brass, Inc. name is now used rarely and only to refer to the organization as a whole.

The corps has competed in the Drum Corps Associates (DCA) World Championships 34 times since 1973 and has placed in the top ten in Open Class competition every year since 1991, the second-longest streak behind the Hawthorne Caballeros Drum and Bugle Corps. In 2011, Minnesota Brass won its first DCA Open Class World Championship title.

At its August 2018 meeting, the board of directors of Minnesota Brass (MBI) voted to pursue an all-age drum and bugle corps to compete during the 2019 summer season.

== Awards ==
DCI Soundsport Best in Show: 2022

DCA World Champions: 2011

DCA Mini-Corps Champions: 1999, 2005 (Minne-Brass)

DCA Colorguard Champions: 2011

DCA Horn Line Champions: 2010, 2011, 2015

DCA Frontline Champions: 2001, 2004, 2005

DCA Percussion Champions: 2003, 2004, 2010, 2013

== Show summary (1973–2026) ==
Key
Blue background indicates finalist
Gold background indicates champion

- 1973-2017: Drum Corps Associates (DCA)
- 2025-present: Drum Corps International (DCI)

Year	Theme	Repertoire	Score	Placement
1990		Jackie (from The Honeymooners) by Jackie Gleason / Uncle Joe Shannon by Bill Conti / Suite for Jazz Orchestra by Michael Pendowski	85.400	11th DCA Open Class semifinalist
1991		Bye Bye Blues by Fred Hamm, Dave Bennett, Bert Lown and Chauncey Gray / Suite for Jazz Orchestra by Michael Pendowski	80.600	9th DCA Open Class finalist
1992		The Date (from Dick Tracy) by Danny Elfman / Pagan Flight (from Dragnet) by Ira Newborn / Tess' Theme (from Dick Tracy) by Danny Elfman / The Chase (from Brigadoon by Frederick Loewe / The Untouchables by Ennio Morricone	84.500	10th DCA Open Class finalist
1993		Perry Mason Theme (aka Park Avenue Beat) by Fred Steiner / Pagan Flight (from Dragnet) by Ira Newborn / Pink Panther by Henry Mancini / Alfred Hitchcock Theme (Funeral March of the Marionette) by Charles Gounod / Batman Theme (from Batman) by Danny Elfman / Singin' in the Rain (from Singin' in the Rain) by Nacio Herb Brown / The Sound of Music by Richard Rodgers / Big Spender (from Sweet Charity) by Cy Coleman and Dorothy Fields / The Untouchables by Ennio Morricone / To Protect and Serve Donuts	85.900	10th DCA Open Class finalist
1994	Memphis Belle	The Final Mission / Vicki and Mr Valves / Prepare for Takeoff / Crippled Belle: The Bomb Run / The Landing (all by George Fenton)	86.700	8th DCA Open Class finalist
1995	Caribbean Holiday	I Can't Get Started by Vernon Duke and Ira Gershwin / El Cumbanchero by Rafael Hernández Marín / St. Thomas by Sonny Rollins / New York State of Mind by Billy Joel / S.O.S by Rick Rueckert	81.200	10th DCA Open Class finalist
1996	Minnesota Jazz - Past and Present	Jackie (from The Honeymooners) by Jackie Gleason / Blackbird (traditional) / Caravan by Juan Tizol / Thanks for the Memories by Ralph Rainger	87.600	7th DCA Open Class finalist
1997	Minnesota Classical - Maybe Not	Light Cavalry Overture by Franz von Suppé / Poet and Peasant Overture by Giuseppe Verdi / Caravan by Juan Tizol	86.900	8th DCA Open Class finalist
1998	Tower of Power	You’re Still a Young Man by Emilio Castillo and Stephen Kupka / Squib Cakes by Chester Thompson / Mr Toad's Wild Ride by Greg Adams and Nick Milo / The Soul of a Child by Bruce Conte / What is Hip by Emilio Castillo, Stephen Kupka and David Garibaldi	92.800	5th DCA Open Class finalist
1999	Earth, Wind and Fire	In the Stone by Allee Willis, David Foster and Maurice White / Got to Get You into My Life by John Lennon and Paul McCartney / Fantasy by Maurice White, Verdine White and Eddie del Barrio / After the Love Has Gone by William B. Champlin / In the Stone (reprise)	95.000	4th DCA Open Class finalist
2000	Chicago	Make Me Smile by James Pankow / Saturday in the Park by Robert Lamm / 25 or 6 to 4 by Robert Lamm / (I've Been) Searchin' So Long by James Pankow / Drum solo / Free by Robert Lamm / Make Me Smile (reprise)	91.700	5th DCA Open Class finalist
2001	Shaken...Not Stirred: Music From James Bond	Dr. No by Monty Norman / You Only Live Twice by John Barry / Tomorrow Never Dies by Sheryl Crow / Live and Let Die by Linda and Paul McCartney / From Russia With Love by John Barry and Lionel Bart / Dr. No (reprise)	92.050	6th DCA Open Class finalist
2002	Black To Blue	Opening fanfare / A Night in Tunisia by Dizzy Gillespie and Frank Paparelli / 'Round Midnight by Thelonious Monk / I'm Beginning to See the Light by Harry James / Blue Skies (from Alexander's Ragtime Band) by Irving Berlin	93.900	4th DCA Open Class finalist
2003	Dreams and Fantasies	Celebration Suite by Chick Corea / Drume Negrita (traditional) / Adiós Nonino by Astor Piazzolla / Time to Say Goodbye by Andrea Bocelli / Spanish Fantasy IV by Chick Corea / Conquistador by Jay Chattaway and Maynard Ferguson	92.500	4th DCA Open Class finalist
2004	Moon Dancing	Moon Over Bourbon Street by Sting / Moondance by Van Morrison / Moonlight Sonata by Ludwig van Beethoven / Fly Me to the Moon by Bart Howard	91.438	5th DCA Open Class finalist
2005	Line and Shape - The Music of Pat Metheny	Third Wind by Pat Metheny and Lyle Mays / Letter from Home by Pat Metheny / The First Circle by Pat Metheny and Lyle Mays	93.038	6th DCA Open Class finalist
2006	Fantasy: A Drum Corps Dream	Open Up Wide by Bill Chase / Get It On by Bill Chase and Terry Richards (Chase) / Fantasy by Maurice White, Verdine White and Eddie del Barrio (Earth Wind and Fire) / The Soul of a Child by Emilio Castillo, Stephen Kupka and Bruce Conte (Tower of Power) / Up Tight by R. Lamm / Fantasy (reprise)	92.325	5th DCA Open Class finalist
2007	Who Are You?	Baba O’Riley / Behind Blue Eyes / Magic Bus / Love, Reign o'er Me / Who Are You? (all by Peter Townshend)	92.963	6th DCA Open Class finalist
2008	Connection	Nutville by Horace Silver / Oblivion by Astor Piazzolla / Wrapped Around Your Finger by Sting / Night Streets by Chick Corea	96.513	2nd DCA Open Class finalist
2009	Nocturne: Song for the Night	Harlem Nocturne by Earle Hagen and Dick Rogers / Commencement by Johnny Richards / Zero Hour by Astor Piazzola / My Immortal by Amy Lee, Ben Moody and David Hodges (Evanescence) / Aspect by Johnny Richards / A Night in Tunisia by Dizzy Gillespie and Frank Paparelli	97.588	2nd DCA Open Class finalist
2010	Caravan	One Night in Bangkok (from Chess) by Benny Andersson, Bjorn Ulvaeus and Tim Rice / Bacchanale (from Samson and Delilah) by Camille Saint-Saens / Nefud Mirage (from Lawrence of Arabia) by Maurice Jarre / Kashmir by Jimmy Page, Robert Plant and John Bonham (Led Zeppelin) / Sheherazade by Nikolai Rimsky-Korsakov / Caravan by Juan Tizol	97.225	2nd DCA Open Class finalist
2011	Valhalla	Immigrant Song by Led Zeppelin / Children's Hour of Dream by Charles Mingus / Imagine by John Lennon / Ride of the Valkyries by Richard Wagner	98.350	1st DCA Open Class champion
2012	Bonnie and Clyde	Summertime (from Porgy and Bess) by George Gershwin and DuBose Heyward / It Don't Mean a Thing If It Ain't Got That Swing by Duke Ellington / Money by Roger Waters (Pink Floyd) / Speechless by Stefani Germanotta / Medea's Dance of Vengeance, Op. 23a by Samuel Barber	96.230	2nd DCA Open Class finalist
2013	PRIMAL	Ritual Fire Dance (from El Amor Brujo) by Manuel de Falla / Dansa Barbara by Neboisa Zivkovic / Danza Final (From Estancia Ballet) by Alberto Ginastera	96.650	3rd DCA Open Class finalist
2014	SuperNova	Knights of Cydonia by Matthew Bellamy (Muse) / Subterranean Homesick Alien by Thom Yorke (Radiohead) / The Planets by Gustav Holst / Lux Aurumque by Eric Whitacre / Supernova	96.530	2nd DCA Open Class finalist
2015	Mad Circus	Karn Evil 9 by Keith Emerson, Greg Lake and Peter Sinfield / The Breakfast Machine from Big Top Pee Wee by Danny Elfman / Complainte Della Butte by Rufus Wainright / Roustabout by Beals Antique / Night on Bald Mountain by Modest Mussorgsky / The Show Must Go On by John Deacon, Roger Taylor, Freddie Mercury and Brian May (Queen)	95.400	3rd DCA Open Class finalist
2016	Now Boarding	To Tame the Perilous Skies by David Holsinger / Speed of Heat by Julie Giroux / Come Fly With Me by Jimmy Van Heusen and Sammy Cahn / Married Life (from UP) by Michael Giacchino / Girl From Ipanema by Antonio Carlos Jobim	96.950	3rd DCA Open Class finalist
2017	Pins & Needles	Hall of the Mountain King (from Peer Gynt Suite #1) by Edvard Grieg / March of the Trolls by Edvard Grieg / Medea's Dance of Vengeance, Op. 23a by Samuel Barber / Coraline by Bruno Courlais / Hurt by Trent Reznor	88.980	9th DCA Open Class finalist
2018	Between the Lines	Green by Michael Torte / Mural (from Pleasantville) by Randy Newman / Paint It, Black by Mick Jagger and Keith Richards (The Rolling Stones) / Pure Imagination (from Willy Wonka & the Chocolate Factory) by Leslie Bricusse and Anthony Newley	Gold	SoundSport
2019	Repertoire unavailable		92.330 (Gold)	2nd SoundSport
2020	Season canceled due to COVID-19			
2021	Corps inactive			
2022	Route 66	Driver’s License by Olivia Rodrigo / Drive My Car by John Lennon and Paul McCartney (The Beatles) / (Get Your Kicks On) Route 66 by Bobby Troup (Chuck Berry) / Free Bird by Allen Collins and Ronnie Van Zant (Lynyrd Skynyrd)	96.667 (Gold)	1st SoundSport, Best of Show
2023	Speakeasy	Crazy in Love by Beyoncé Knowles / Piano Man by Billy Joel / Closing Time by Dan Wilson (Semisonic)	Gold	2nd SoundSport
2024	Midwest Side Story	Nature Boy by eden ahbez / Concerto in F by George Gershwin / Copacabana by Barry Manilow, Jack Feldman and Bruce Sussman / Bar Fight (Original music) / Ave Maria by Charles Gounod / Il Padrino by Nino Rota / I Knew You Were Trouble by Taylor Swift, Max Martin and Karl Johan Schuster	Gold	2nd SoundSport
2025	Fieri: Rising From The Ashes	Automatic by Brett Kramer, J. Tyler Johnson, Joshua William Taylor, Nate Campany and Skylar Stonestreet (Half Alive) / Fire (from Elements) by Brian Balmages / Ashes by Petey Martin, Jordan Smith and Andrew Tjornhom Tedd / Phoenix Ascent by James Minas and Rok Nardin / Firebird Rising by Igor Stravinski	80.300	11th DCI All-Age finalist
2026	The Oak – An 80th Anniversary Production	Ether by Adam Neely and Shawn Crowder (Sungazer) / Iris by John Rzeznik (Goo Goo Dolls) / Golden Hour by Cait Nishimura / Concerto for Marimba by Gene Koschinski / Trees by Tyler Joseph (Twenty One Pilots) / Iris (reprise)	79.625	12th DCI All-Age finalist
