= Syracuse Brigadiers Drum and Bugle Corps =

The Syracuse Brigadiers
- Location: Syracuse, New York
- Division: Open Class
- Founded: 1938
- Championship titles: AL: 1957, 1958; DCA: 1997, 1999, 2000, 2001, 2002

The Brigadiers were an all-age drum and bugle corps operated by the Brigadiers Music Association, a 501(c)(3) non-profit organization. The Brigadiers were charter members of Drum Corps Associates and were based in Syracuse, New York.

== Early years ==
The corps was founded as a junior drum and bugle corps sponsored by the Polish Legion of American Veterans (P.L.A.V.) Post #14 in Syracuse, NY. It performed as a parade corps until World War II. After World War II, the group was reorganized as an all-age drum and bugle corps and began field competition in 1947.

The Brigadiers competed in the American Legion National Championships from 1947 until 1964, making finals in every year. The corps captured American Legion National Championships in 1957 and 1958. In 1965, the Brigadiers became charter members of DCA, and they competed until 1973, when they ceased operations.

== Modern Years ==
In October 1990, several alumni of the Syracuse Brigadiers met to discuss resurrecting the corps. After placing advertisements on television and radio, a parade corps was formed for 1991 and a field corps was formed in 1992. In their first year back in competition, the corps placed 11th at finals. In 1993, the corps placed ninth and regained full membership within DCA. The Brigadiers went on to win championships in 1997, 1999, 2000, 2001, and 2002. The 2002 show earned the corps what was at the time the highest recorded score in DCA history, 98.6. In 2009 the corps became inactive due to lack of funding and declining membership.
