= Skyliners Drum and Bugle Corps =

Drum and bugle corps from New York City

The New York Skyliners Drum and Bugle Corps
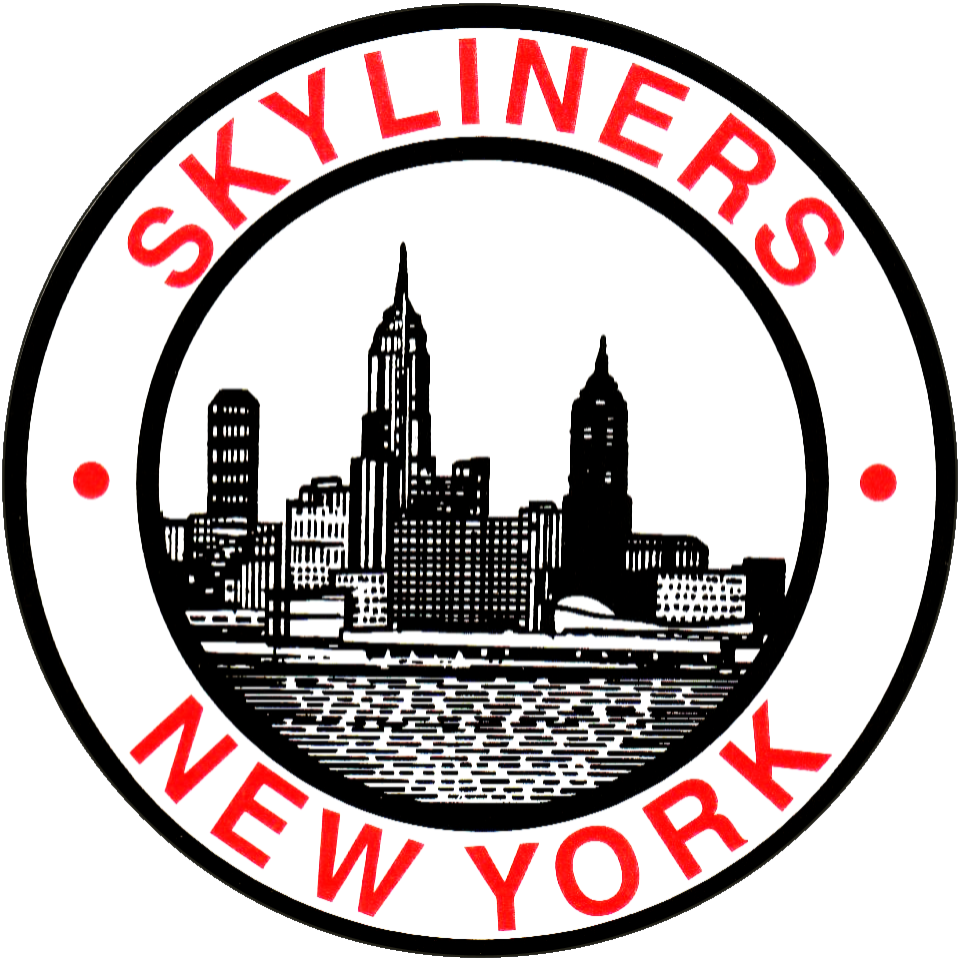
- Location: New York City, NY
- Division: Class A
- Founded: 1945
- Director: Joshua Delanuez
- Championship titles: American Legion National - 1949, 1950, American Legion World Open - 1963, DCA Open Class - 1966, 1971, 1975, DCA Class A - 1999, 2002
- Website: skylinersdbc.org

The New York Skyliners Drum and Bugle Corps (formerly the Raymond A. Garbarina Memorial Corps, and Garbarina Skyliners) are a competitive all-age drum and bugle corps from New York City, and currently rehearsing in Broome County, New York. The Skyliners were one of the original founding corps of Drum Corps Associates (DCA) and have won every major title available to an all-age drum and bugle corps. The Skyliners are sponsored by the Garbarina-Mazarakos Memorial American Legion Post #1523 in New York City. They have won the DCA World Championship three times, the DCA A Class Championship twice, and the American Legion National Title twice.

== History ==
The New York Skyliners were formed in 1945 to create a corps for members of two New York City American Legion junior corps, The Phoebe Apperson Hearst Post #1197, and the Grand Street Boys from Post #1025, that were returning from service in World War II. Rehearsals were first held in 1945. They were officially accepted as a senior corps in the American Legion in 1946, and were named after Raymond A. “Gabby” Garbarina, a young man who played with both the Grand Street Boys and the Hearst Post corps, who had lost his life in the war. The new post was known as the Raymond A. Garbarina Memorial Post #1523, New York City. The corps itself was also known as the Raymond A. Garbarina Memorial Corps.

After the 1949 season, the corps became known as the Garbarina Skyliners, and later, the New York Skyliners.. During the Skyliners' years in the American Legion League, they claimed the championship title three times. In 1964, the Skyliners, along with several senior corps in the northeastern United States, formed the Drum Corps Associates to establish a more formal competition format than the then-current haphazard collection of contests. The New York Skyliners succeeded in DCA, going on to win both several Open Class and Class A titles, before dwindling attendance forced the corps to remain inactive.

In 2014, Director Larry Carbonell and Assistant Director Doreen Sandor revived the inactive corps and moved its location from New York to Scranton/Wilkes-Barre, Pennsylvania. In late 2022 the decision was made to shift the corps' rehearsal area to Upstate New York and reintroduce the 'New York' Skyliners name and historical logos. In 2023, the member corps of DCA voted to enter into a 2 year partnership with Drum Corps International, forming the new DCI All Age Class beginning in 2024. The World, Open, and A classes remain intact for the 2024 season.

== Show summary 1972–2025 ==
Key
Goldenrod background indicates DCA Class A Champion
Turquoise background indicates DCA Class A Finalist
Metallic gold background indicates DCA Open Class Champion
Blue background indicates DCA Open Class Finalist

Year	Repertoire	Score	Placement
1972	Little Old New York (from Tenderloin) * Give My Regards to Broadway * Goodbye Broadway, Hello France (from For Me And My Gal) * Alabama Jubilee * Lucretia McEvil * The Elks' Parade * Slaughter on Tenth Avenue (from On Your Toes) * Little Old New York (from Tenderloin) * East Side-West Side Fanfare	89.900	2nd Place; Open Class; Finalist
1973	Applause * New York, New York (from On the Town) * Little Old New York (from Tenderloin) * Traffic Jam * 2nd Rhapsody * The Elks' Parade * Slaughter on Tenth Avenue (from On Your Toes) * Applause * East Side-West Side Fanfare	82.500	5th Place; Open Class; Finalist
1974	Gee, Officer Krupke (from West Side Story) * (Drum Solo) * Cool (from West Side Story) * West Side Story Medley * The Elks' Parade * (Drum Solo) * Lullaby of Broadway (from 42nd Street) * Traffic Jam * Little Old New York (from Tenderloin) * New York, New York (from On the Town)	80.950	3rd Place; Open Class; Finalist
1975	How Could You Believe Me When I Said I Loved You * Hymn to Victory (from Victory at Sea) * West Side Story Medley * The Elks' Parade * Give My Regards to Broadway * East Side-West Side Fanfare	88.500	1st Place; Open Class; Champion
1976	On the Town * Fancy Free * Hymn to Victory (from Victory at Sea) * Porgy and Bess * The Elks' Parade * Broadway * 42nd Street (from 42nd Street) * East Side-West Side Fanfare	86.000	4th Place; Open Class; Finalist
1977	All That Jazz * Rocky * West Side Story * Fascinatin' Rhythm (from Lady Be Good) * Broadway	85.500	6th Place; Open Class; Finalist
1978	Ritual Fire Dance (from El Amor Brujo) * Rhapsody in Blue * The Elks' Parade * New York, New York (from New York, New York) * Traffic Jam * Little Old New York (from Tenderloin) * East Side-West Side Fanfare	85.500	3rd Place; Open Class; Finalist
1979	Something's Coming (from West Side Story) * Rhapsody in Blue * Puttin' on the Ritz * New York, New York (from New York New York) * Traffic Jam * Little Old New York (from Tenderloin) * East Side-West Side Fanfare	84.550	4th Place; Open Class; Finalist
1980	Slaughter on Tenth Avenue (from On Your Toes) * Copacabana * Carnival * Root Beer Rag (drum solo) * New York, New York (from New York, New York) * Traffic Jam * East Side-West Side Fanfare	84.550	4th Place; Open Class; Finalist
1981	Slaughter on Tenth Avenue (from On Your Toes) * Carnival * Big Noise from Winnetka (from Reveille with Beverly) * Late in the Evening * New York, New York (from New York, New York)	88.800	4th Place; Open Class; Finalist
1982	On the Town * Fancy Free * 42nd Street (from 42nd Street) * Big Noise from Winnetka (from Reveille with Beverly) * Do Like You (drum solo) * Come In from the Rain * New York, New York (from On the Town) * 2nd Rhapsody * New York Medley	86.900	4th Place; Open Class; Finalist
1983	42nd Street (from 42nd Street) * The Rainmaker * The Ballad of Billy the Kid * I'm Not Going (from Dreamgirls) * New York, New York (from New York, New York)	85.850	3rd Place; Open Class; Finalist
1984	Take the 'A' Train * Carnival * I'm Not Going (from Dreamgirls) * New York, New York (from New York, New York)	84.050	5th Place; Open Class; Finalist
1985	I Love NY * Slaughter on Tenth Avenue (from On Your Toes) * Little Linda * I Am Your Dreamgirl (from Dreamgirls) * I Won't Go (from Dreamgirls) * New York, New York (from New York, New York)	79.300	6th Place; Open Class; Finalist
1986	New York, New York (from On the Town) * Something's Coming (from West Side Story) * Somewhere (from West Side Story) * 42nd Street (from 42nd Street) * Lullaby of Broadway (from 42nd Street) * New York, New York (from New York, New York)	82.950	7th Place; Open Class; Finalist
1987	Ya Gotta Try * The Rainmaker * Somewhere Out There (from An American Tail) * Skyliner Suite	88.900	7th Place; Open Class; Finalist
1988	The City Wakes * The Rainmaker * Harlem Nocturne * New York, New York (from On the Town) * Signature (from On The Town)	88.300	6th Place; Open Class; Finalist
1989	The City Wakes * Across the Midnight Sky * The Witch * Hava Nagila * Every Street's a Boulevard (from Hazel Flagg)	86.500	8th Place; Open Class; Finalist
1990	Manhattan Overtures * Harlem Nocturne * Hava Nagila * Every Street's a Boulevard (from Hazel Flagg) * The Elks' Parade * New York, New York (from New York, New York)	91.900	6th Place; Open Class; Finalist
1991	Harlem Nocturne * Since I Fell for You * Final Truth * Mack the Knife * Signature (from On The Town)	85.000	6th Place; Open Class; Finalist
1992	New York State of Mind * Harlem Nocturne * Caravan * Since I Fell for You * Avalon * New York, New York (from New York, New York)	89.400	7th Place; Open Class; Finalist
1993	Guys and Dolls: Act 1 Luck Be A Lady (from Guys and Dolls) * The Crapshooter's Dance (from Guys and Dolls) * If I Were a Bell (from Guys and Dolls) * Runyonland (from Guys and Dolls)	85.800	7th Place; Open Class; Finalist
1994	Guys and Dolls: Act 2 Oldest Established Crap Game (from Guys and Dolls) * My Time of Day (from Guys and Dolls) * Luck Be A Lady (from Guys and Dolls)	88.700	6th Place; Open Class; Finalist
1995	A Night On The Town With The New York Skyliners; Slaughter on Tenth Avenue (from On Your Toes) * Moondance * Dreamgirls * New York, New York (from On the Town) * Signature (from On The Town) * On the Town	88.000	6th Place; Open Class; Finalist
1996	Music from On the Town; I Feel Like I'm Not Out of Bed Yet (from On the Town) * New York, New York (from On the Town) * Miss Turnstiles (from On the Town) * Lonely Town (from On the Town) * The Great Lover (from On the Town) * Times Square (from On the Town)	80.100	11th Place; Open Class; Finalist
1997	Introduction * Nutville * The Duke * Sing Sing Sing * Signature (from On The Town)	81.800	13th Place; Class A
1998	Intro to Frank * Luck Be A Lady (from Guys and Dolls) * The Way You Look Tonight (from Swing Time) * I Have Dreamed (from The King and I) * The Lady is a Tramp (from Babes in Arms)		
1999	Legends of New York; Mercy Mercy Mercy * Ya Gotta Try * Moonlight Serenade * The Duke Medley	74.900	1st Place; Class A Champion
2000	Sky2K on Broadway; On Broadway * It's All Right With Me (from Can-Can) * Someone to Watch Over me (from Oh, Kay!) * The Man I Love * When I Fall In Love * 42nd Street (from 42nd Street) * It Don't Mean a Thing If It Ain't Got That Swing * Give My Regards to Broadway * Traffic Jam * Every Street's a Boulevard (from Hazel Flagg) * Signature (from On The Town)	83.000	9th Place; Class A Finalist
2001	Blood, Sweat and Sky; Hi-De-Ho (That Old Sweet Roll) * Somethin' Comin' On * For My Lady * God Bless The Child * You've Made Me So Very Happy	86.500	9th Place; Class A Finalist
2002	Love Notes From The City; New York State of Mind * You Brought a New Kind of Love New Kind of Love * This Must Be Love * I Want More * Big Time * New York, New York (from New York, New York)	80.150	1st Place; Class A Champion
2003	Big City Dreams; I Want More * Last Tango * Big Time * I Have Dreamed (from The King and I)	81.300	2nd Place; Class A Finalist
2004	New York Rhapsody... The Music of George Gershwin; Second Prelude * Fascinatin' Rhythm (from Lady Be Good) * Rhapsody in Blue * Concerto in F * An American in Paris * Somebody Loves Me * I Got Rhythm (from Girl Crazy) * Of Thee I Sing (from Of Thee I Sing) * Finale	81.088	11th Place; Class A Finalist
2005	Night and Day in NYC; Night and Day * Prelude, Fugue and Riffs * A Nightingale Sang in Berkeley Square * A Night in Tunisia	80.875	13th Place; Class A
2006	Fire In The Sky: Four Smoldering Episodes; En Fuego * Havana * Skyfire Tango * Bohemian Rhapsody	79.150	15th Place; Class A
2007	Comes Love * Sing, Sing, Sing * Big Noise from Winnetka	77.250	11th Place; Mini Corps
2008–13	Corps inactive		
2014	A New Dawn, A New Day; Feeling Good * Blue Skies (from Alexander's Ragtime Band) * It Ain't Necessarily So (from Porgy and Bess) * 'Round Midnight * Caravan	77.630	13th Place; Class A
2015	Whatever Lola Wants; It Had Better Be Tonight (from The Pink Panther) * Whatever Lola Wants (from Damn Yankees) * Ain't No Sunshine * Tonight Quintet	79.180	13th Place; Class A
2016	Corner of the Sky; Corner of the Sky * Mr. Blue Sky * Good Bye Blue Skies * Storm (from The Four Seasons) * Orange Colored Sky	83.500	11th Place; Class A Finalist
2017	Escape; Escape to Paradise * Xscape * Lost Boy * Kingfishers Catch Fire Movement 2	82.230	11th Place; Class A Finalist
2018	TOTALITY - Everything Changes... Hymn To The Sun * Totality * Song Of Joy * Here Comes the Sun * Don't Let The Sun Go Down On Me	79.750	3rd Place; Class A Finalist
2019	She Returns; Spoonful of Sugar* Feed the Birds* Supercalifragilisticexpialidocious* Step in Time	80.825	2nd Place; Class A Finalist
2020–21	Season cancelled due to the COVID-19 pandemic		
2022	Slaughter; Oklahoma * New York New York (from On The Town) * Slaughter on Tenth Avenue (from On Your Toes)	80.950	2nd Place; Class A Finalist
2023	The Power of 3 Swirling Prisms * Danse Bacchanale * Deus Ex Machina * Moondance * August's Rhapsody * Fate of the Gods	80.200	2nd Place; Class A Finalist
2024	One Day, I'll Fly; Abram's Pursuit * One Day I'll Fly Away * Fly to Paradise	76.750	3rd Place; Class A Finalist
2025	Corps inactive		
