= PNC Field =

Baseball stadium in Pennsylvania, US

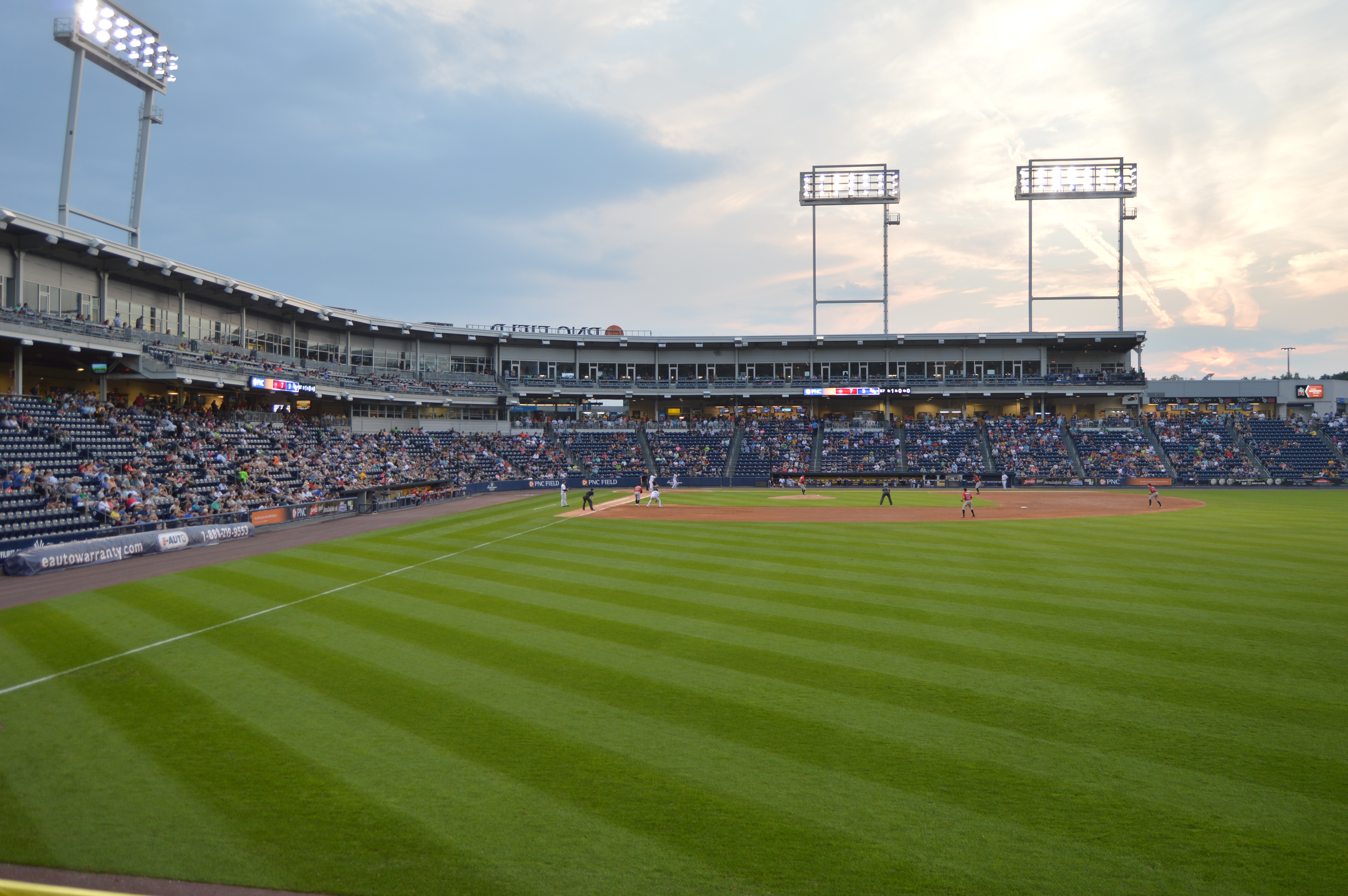
- PNC Field, August 2018

- Location within Pennsylvania Location within the United States
- Interactive map of PNC Field
- Former names: Lackawanna County Stadium (1989–2006)
- Address: 235 Montage Mountain Road; Moosic, Pennsylvania; United States
- Coordinates: 41°21′37.46″N 75°41′2.28″W
- Owner: Lackawanna County Stadium Authority
- Operator: Mandalay Baseball Properties
- Capacity: 10,000 (2013–present); 10,310 (2007–2011); 10,982 (1989–2006)
- Surface: Astroturf (1989–2006); Grass (2007–present)
- Record attendance: 11,515
- Field size: Left field line: 326 ft (99 m); Left-center field: 371 ft (113 m); Center field: 408 ft (124 m); Right-center field: 371 ft (113 m); Right field line: 330 ft (100 m)

Construction
- Groundbreaking: August 28, 1986
- Opened: April 26, 1989
- Renovated: 2012 (reconstructed)
- Reopened: April 4, 2013
- Cost: US$25 million ($64.9 million in 2025 dollars); US$43.3 million (renovation) ($60.7 million in 2025 dollars)
- Architects: GSGSB Inc. EwingCole (renovation)
- Structural engineers: Greenman-Pedersen, Inc.
- General contractors: Melon Stuart Construction; Alvin H. Butz, Inc. (renovation)

Tenant
- Scranton/Wilkes-Barre Highlanders (IL/AAAE) 1989–2011, 2013–present

Website
- www.milb.com/scranton-wb/ballpark/visitpncfield

PNC Field is a 10,000-seat minor league baseball stadium that is located in Moosic, Pennsylvania, in the Scranton/Wilkes-Barre metropolitan area that was built in 1989 and rebuilt in 2013. The stadium is home to the Scranton/Wilkes-Barre Highlanders, the Triple-A affiliate of the New York Yankees.

The stadium also hosts high school sports games. It hosts the PIAA District II baseball district championship games for high school baseball. It also hosts high school football games such as the Railriders Bowl for Scranton/Wilkes-Barre area high school football teams, sponsored by the Highlanders.

PNC Field was formerly known as Lackawanna County Stadium from 1989 to 2006; Lackawanna County sold the naming rights to PNC Bank on February 1, 2007, and the stadium became known as PNC Field.

== History ==
=== Original structure ===
The stadium opened on April 26, 1989, and was built as a "mini version" of the Phillies' Veterans Stadium in Philadelphia. The artificial turf surfaced stadium was used as a multipurpose facility. The upper-level seats of the stadium were orange and the lower-level seats were green. They also have bleacher seats at the stadium. Many amateur sports competitions were held there, as well as regional band competitions, ice skating, and car shows.

On July 12, 1995, the stadium hosted the Triple-A All-Star Game. The American League affiliate stars shutout their National League opponents, 9–0, in front of 10,965 fans. Future major leaguers to appear in the game included Derek Jeter, Jeromy Burnitz, Jason Isringhausen, and manager Grady Little.

In 2007, the Scranton/Wilkes-Barre franchise signed a Player Development Contract with the New York Yankees, ending an 18-year agreement with the Philadelphia Phillies. This new contract called for the conversion of the playing surface to natural grass. The stadium still plays host to several amateur baseball competitions throughout the season.

In February 2010, the SWB Yankees announced that they have reached an agreement with PNC Bank to renew the naming rights to the stadium. Terms of the deal were not released. PNC Field hosted the 2017 Triple-A Baseball National Championship Game at the end of the season, where the winner of the Pacific Coast League faced the winner of the International League.

=== Renovations/reconstruction and new structure ===
At a public hearing on November 8, 2010, officials from Lackawanna County, Mandalay Baseball Properties and the Lackawanna County Multipurpose Stadium Authority discussed the potential sale of the SWB Yankees and possible renovation of PNC Field. The following day, the club announced plans to pursue a $40 million renovation to the stadium which would dramatically alter the layout of PNC Field.

The $43.3 million renovation project was revealed to be a complete reconstruction of the stadium. The reconstruction consisted of demolishing the existing upper deck, press box, and concourse behind the playing field, while retaining the seating bowl and ticket office. The stadium would receive a new press box, luxury suites, and wrap-around concourse.

The renovation officially began on April 27, 2012, with the removal of seats in the stadium's upper deck. The architect of the renovation was EwingCole while the general contractor was Alvin H. Butz, Inc.

The renovation/reconstruction of PNC Field was completed in time for opening day in 2013.

It was the Yankees' alternate training site in 2020 when the COVID-19 pandemic forced the cancellation of the Minor League Baseball campaign and the abbreviation of the Major League Baseball season.

== Gallery ==
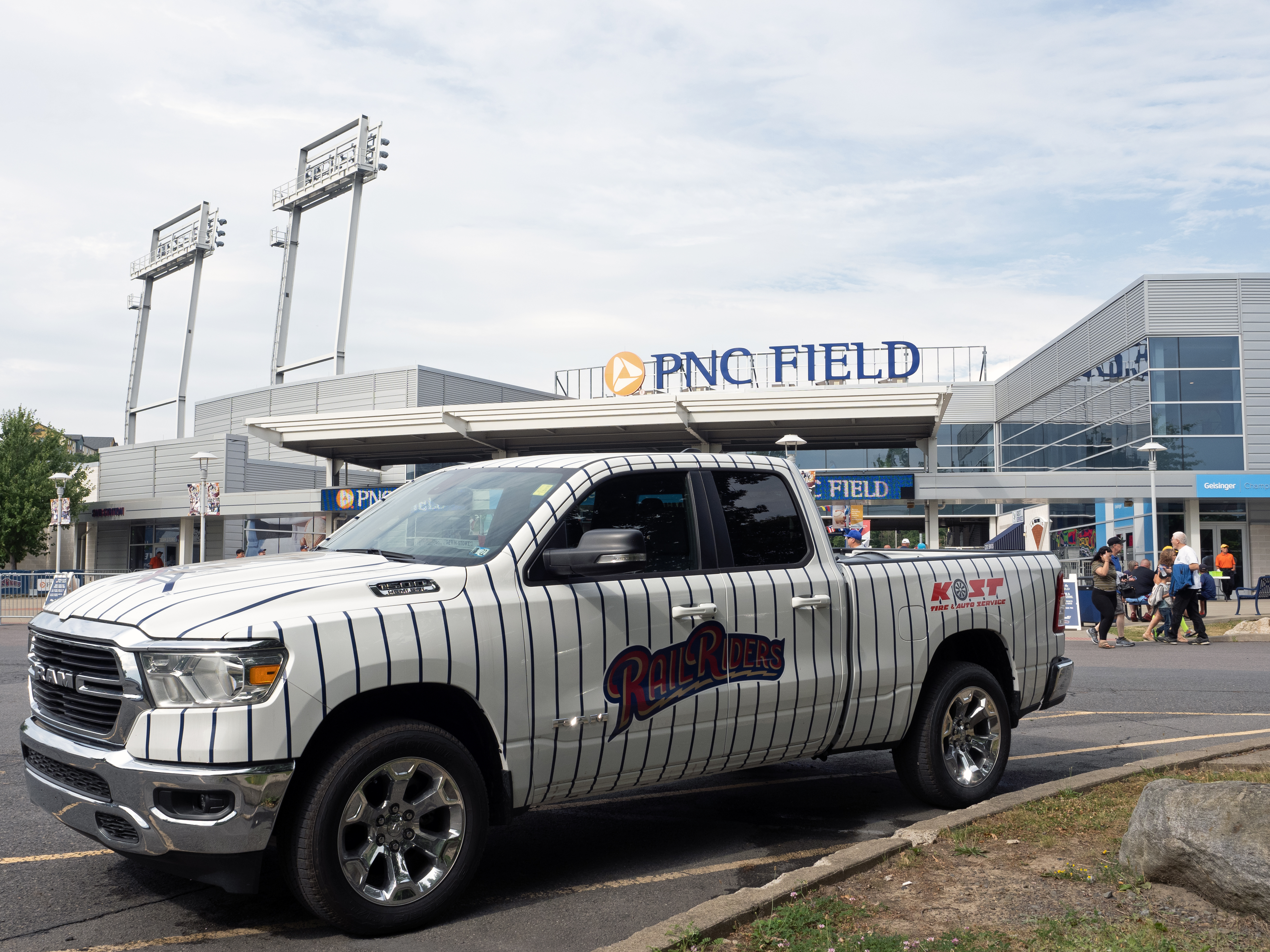
PNC Bank Park – Scranton, PA July 16, 2022

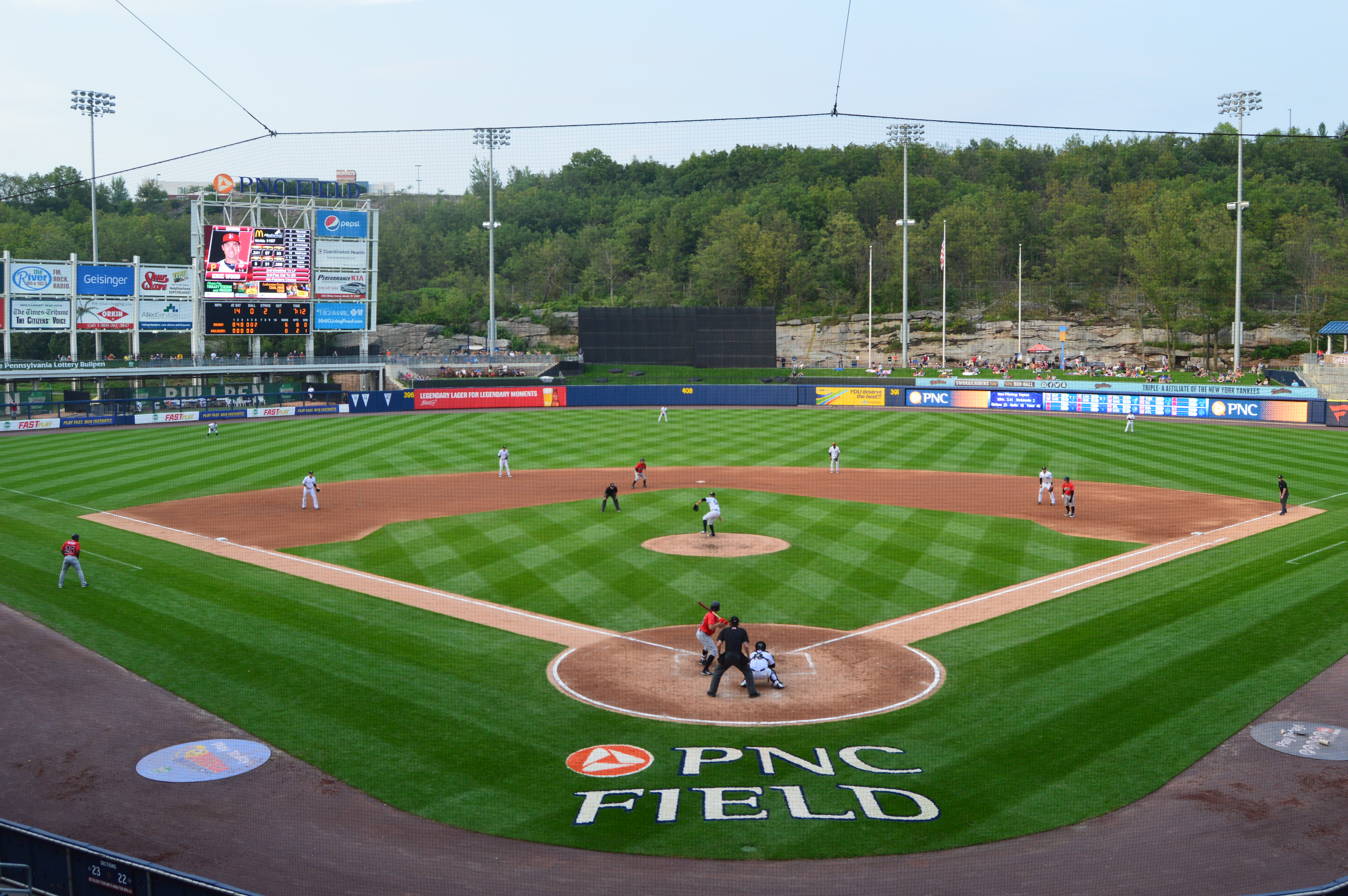
PNC Field as seen from behind home plate

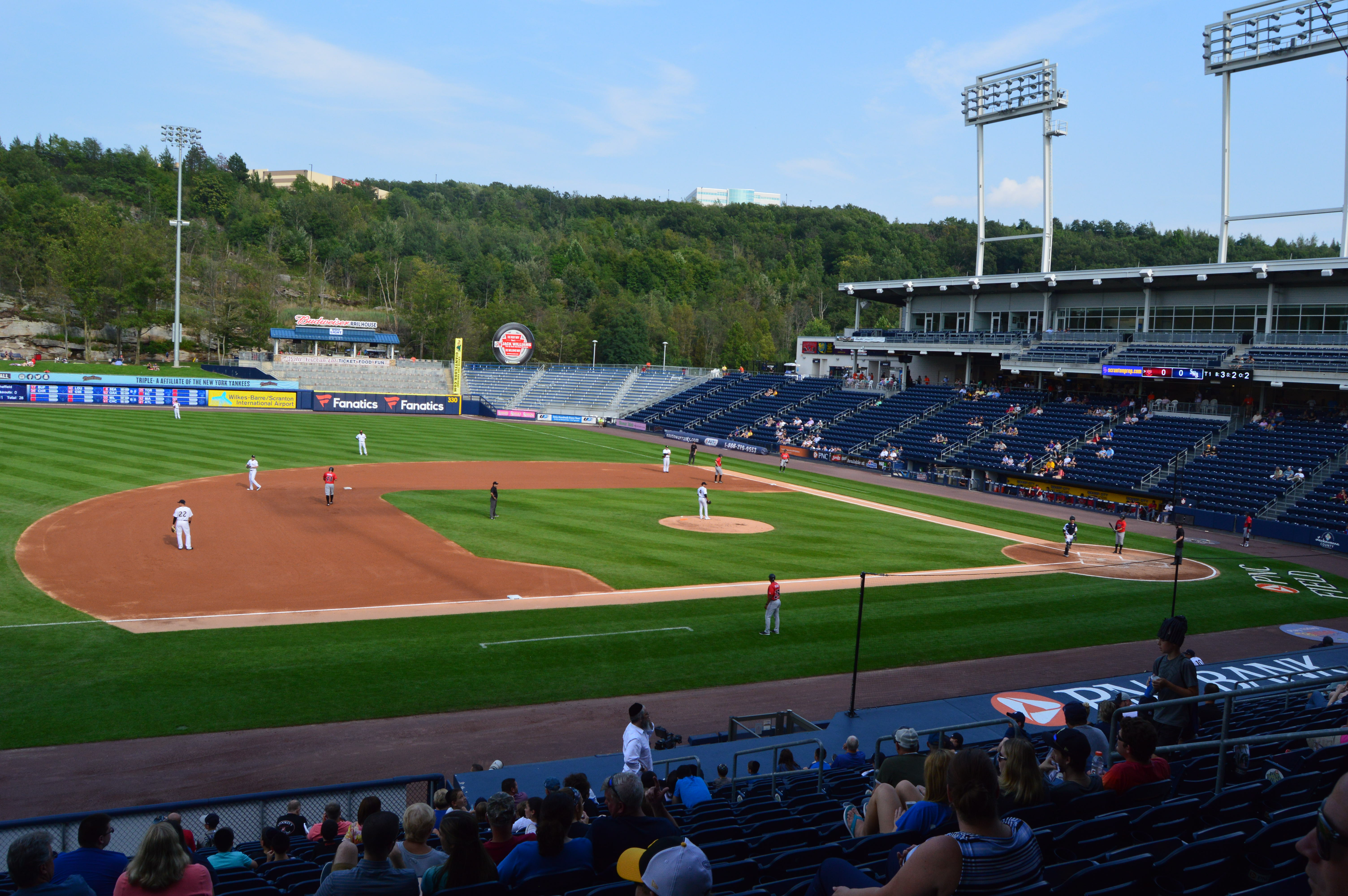
PNC Field as seen from the third base side

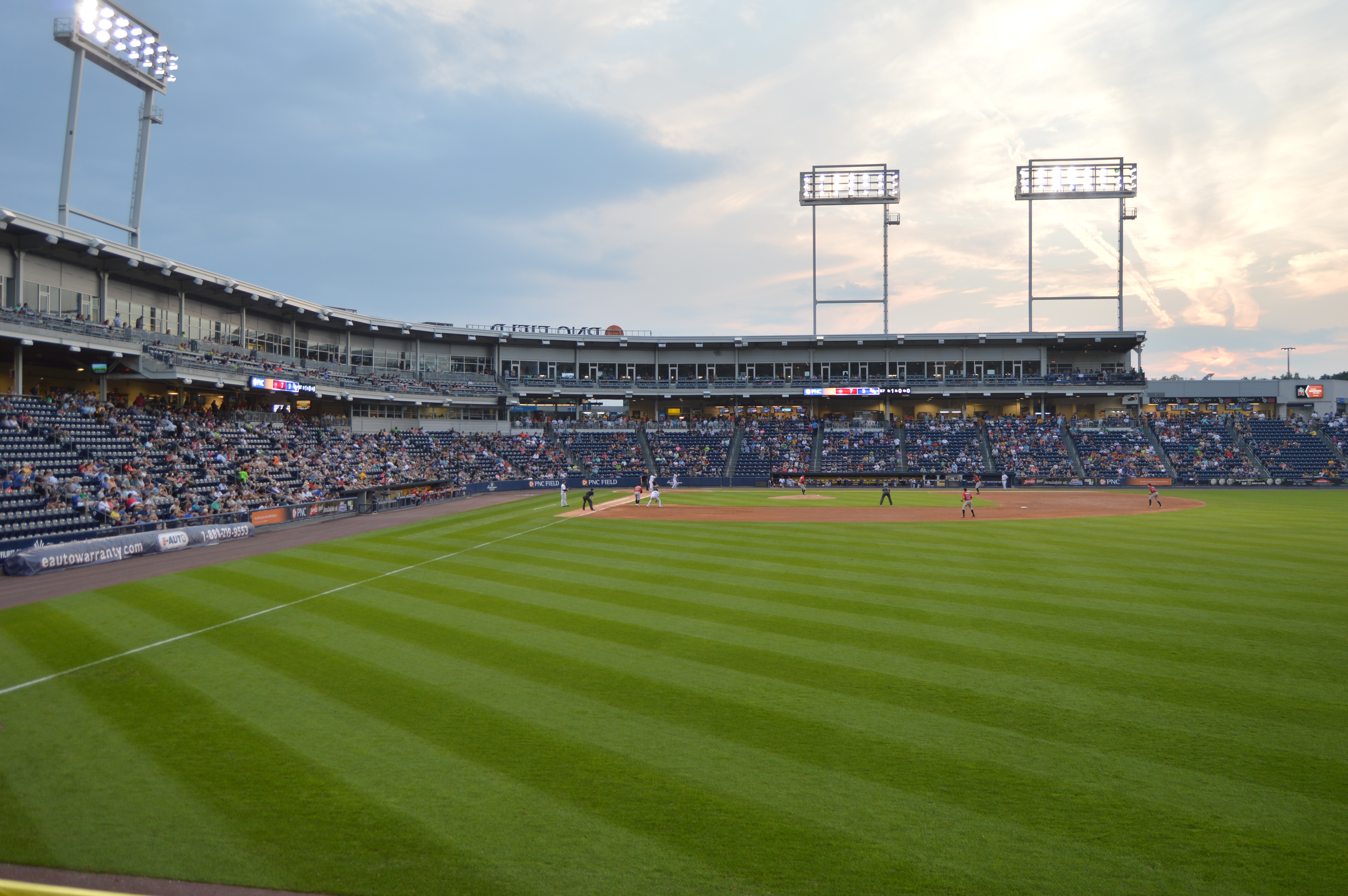
PNC Field as seen from right field

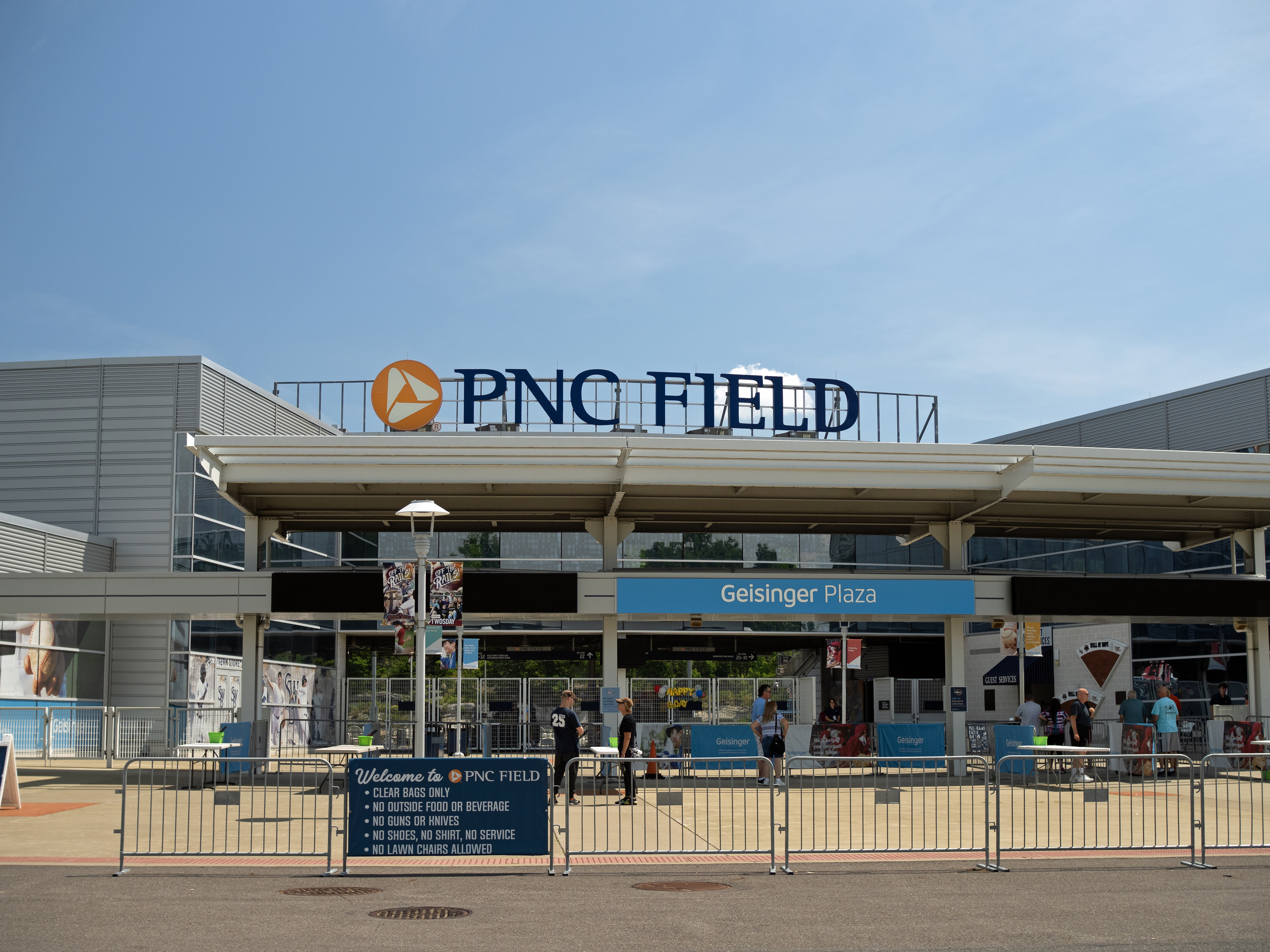
Exterior of PNC Field
