= Connecticut Hurricanes Drum and Bugle Corps =

Non-profit organization in Connecticut

The Connecticut Hurricanes
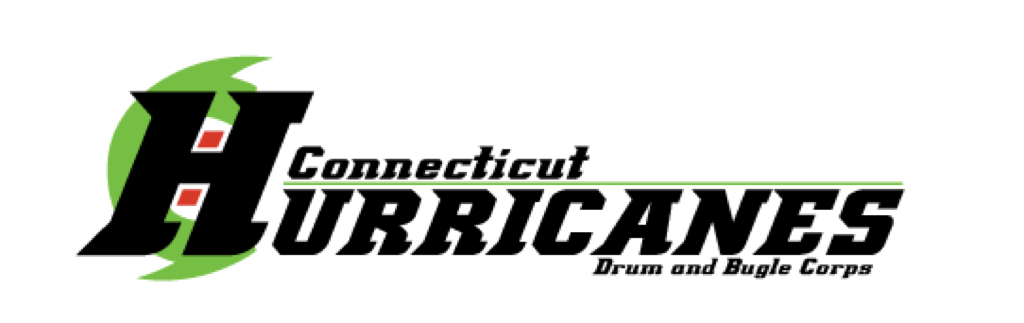
- Location: Seymour, CT
- Division: DCI All-Age
- Founded: 1932
- Executive Director: David Pyrch
- Championship titles: American Legion: 1967; DCA Open Class: 1967; 1969; 1981; 2022; 2023

The Connecticut Hurricanes Drum and Bugle Corps, also known by their nickname the Hurcs, is a 501 (c) (3) non-profit organization based in Seymour, Connecticut existing as an all-age competitive drum and bugle corps. The Hurricanes reigned as the oldest, continually active organization in Drum Corps Associates until its merger with Drum Corps International.

== History ==
=== Pre-competitive years, 1932–1954 ===
The Hurricanes were formed in 1932 in Derby, CT and were originally known as the John H. Collins Post Fife Drum & Bugle Corps. Members were predominantly veterans from World War I. They thrived as a parade corps for twenty three years accompanying the John H. Collins American Legion Post in local parades as well as to the American Legion's State and National Conventions throughout the U.S.A. In the post World War II years of the 1940s the ranks were swelled by returning vets, as well as many new members, and the interest began shifting towards competitive field competition, an activity rapidly gaining in popularity. The fifes were phased out beginning in 1949 as the corps transformed to drums and bugles only.

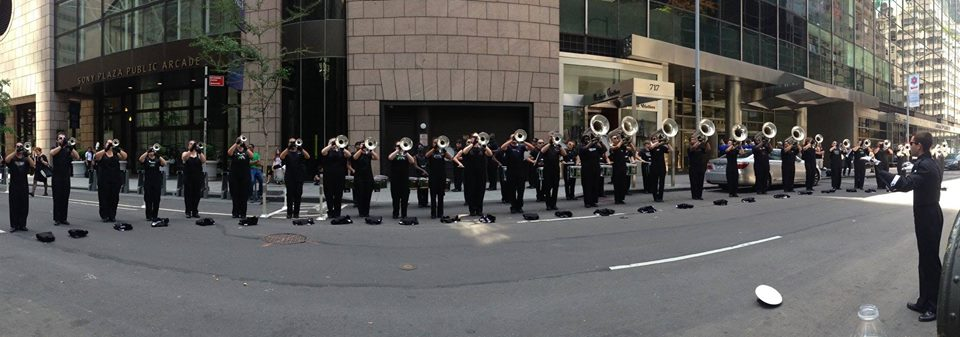
The Hurricanes horn line warming up at the Israeli Day Parade in New York City

=== Pre-DCA, 1955–1963 ===
The Corps officially transformed into a competitive field corps in 1955 and became a member of the Yankee Circuit, and subsequently the Northeastern Circuit. Though the corps was unofficially known by the nickname Hurricanes since 1951, Hurricane Diane and Hurricane Connie, powerful back to back storms that devastated the Naugatuck Valley of Connecticut in 1955, served as the inspiration to permanently change the name of the corps to the Connecticut Hurricanes in February 1956. The fledgling corps endured the expected growing pains that accompanied the transition in those first few years, but a top notch instructional staff and gritty determination propelled the Corps towards new heights and they would eventually become one of the premier corps of the Northeastern Circuit, where they competed through 1963, garnering two championships.

=== Modern years, 1964–present ===
In 1964 on the heels of a successful rise to prominence in the Northeastern Circuit, the Hurricanes became a charter member of Drum Corps Associates (DCA). Since that inaugural year of DCA competition, they have captured five DCA Championship titles (1967, 1969, 1981, 2022, and 2023) and have failed to reach the finals in the DCA championship contest five times (1986, 1989, 2003, 2016, and 2017). The Hurricanes have finished in the coveted top five in DCA finals competition a respectable twenty-six times. Starting in 2024, due to DCA merging with DCI, the Hurricanes will now be competing in the new DCI All-Age Class.

== Show summary (1972–2024) ==
Year	Theme	Repertoire	Score	Placement
1965			84.360	2nd Place Open Class Finalist
1966			84.400	2nd Place Open Class Finalist
1967			85.583	1st Place Open Class Champion
1968			78.450	6th Place Open Class Finalist
1969			79.475	1st Place Open Class Champion
1970			80.950	3rd Place Open Class Finalist
1971		If My Friends Could See Me Now (from Sweet Charity) by Cy Coleman & Dorothy Fields / I'm a Brass Band (from Sweet Charity) by Cy Coleman & Dorothy Fields / Stars & Stripes Forever by John Philip Sousa / Malaguena by Ernesto Lecuona / Hallelujah Chorus by George Frideric Handel / They Call the Wind Maria (from Paint Your Wagon) by Frederick Loewe & Alan Jay Lerner / Hang 'em High by Dominic Frontiere / The Magnificent Seven by Elmer Bernstein / Also Sprach Zarathustra (from Space 2001: A Space Odyssey) by Richard Strauss	87.930	4th Place Open Class Finalist
1972		Fanfare for the New * Fiddler on the Roof * Malaguena * The Impossible Dream (from Man of La Mancha) * America the Beautiful * Rule Britannia * La Marseillaise * Fanfare for the Common Man * Hang 'Em High * Magnificent Seven * Sprach Zarathustra (from 2001: A Space Odyssey)	88.200	4th Place Open Class Finalist (Tie)
1973		Circus Medley; Entry of the Gladiators, Ballyhoo March, Barnum and Bailey's Favorites & Billboard March * Theme from Shaft * Rhapsody in Blue * Journey for Peace * America the Beautiful * Rule Britannia * La Marseillaise * Fanfare for the Common Man * The Impossible Dream (from Man of La Mancha) * What the World Needs Now * Hang 'Em High * Magnificent Seven * Billboard March (reprise)	85.300	3rd Place Open Class Finalist
1974		Stormy Weather (from Stormy Weather) * Don't Rain on My Parade (from Funny Girl) * Rat Tat Tat * Margie * Circus Medley; Entry of the Gladiators, Ballyhoo March, Barnum and Bailey's Favorites & Billboard March * The Way We Were * Tropical Heatwave * They Call the Wind Maria (from Paint Your Wagon) * Magnificent Seven * Stormy Weather (from Stormy Weather)	66.700	6th Place Open Class Finalist
1975		I Got Rhythm (from Girl Crazy) * Walk on the Wild Side * Hallelujah Chorus * Jesus Christ Superstar * Hang 'Em High * Magnificent Seven * Circus Medley; Entry of the Gladiators, Ballyhoo March, Barnum and Bailey's Favorites & Billboard March * My Way	86.980	4th Place Open Class Finalist
1976		I Got Rhythm * Ease on Down the Road * Tropical Heat Wave * Hallelujah Chorus * Yankee Doodle * Stars and Stripes Forever *	79.950	6th Place Open Class Finalist
1977		Light Cavalry Overture * Watch Closely Now (drum solo) * Mighty High * Stormy Weather * Oklahoma Crude * Velvet Green (drum solo) * Nadia's Theme * Magnificent Seven	78.650	8th Place Open Class Finalist
1978		Cantina Band (from Star Wars) * Main Title (from Star Wars) * Throne Room (from Star Wars) * Antares, the Star * Princess Leia's Theme (from Star Wars) * Sanctus (from The Mass) * Agnus Dei (from The Mass) * Chorale Almighty Father (from The Mass) * Offertory (from The Mass) * Saturday Night Fever Medley * Salsation * My Way * Magnificent Seven	82.800	5th Place Open Class Finalist
1979		Children of Sanchez * Sgt. Pepper's Lonely Hearts Club Band * "Got to Get You into My Life" * Nowhere Man * Sgt. Pepper's Lonely Hearts Club Band * My Way * Magnificent Seven	78.650	5th Place Open Class Finalist
1980		Les Preludes Overture * Queen of Sheba March * Swing, Swing, Swing (from 1941) * Spirit of America Medley * Magnificent Seven	86.350	3rd Place Open Class Finalist
1981		Les Preludes Overture * Queen of Sheba March * Swing, Swing, Swing (from 1941) * Salute to Freedom * Devil Went Down to Georgia * It's My Turn * Magnificent Seven	89.650	1st Place Open Class Champion
1982		Rustic Wedding Overture * Moonlight Serenade * Swing, Swing, Swing (from 1941) * Salute to Freedom * Let It Be Me * Magnificent Seven	87.650	3rd Place Open Class Finalist
1983		Overture (from Swan Lake) * Rustic Wedding March * Swing, Swing, Swing (from 1941) * Hallelujah Chorus * Memory (from Cats) * Magnificent Seven	82.200	7th Place Open Class Finalist
1984		Meadowland * Pictures at an Exhibition * Gumbie Cats (from Cats) * Rhapsody in Blue * Magnificent Seven	83.250	6th Place Open Class Finalist
1985		Olympic Fanfare * Imagination * Don't Leave Me * I Loved These Days * Magnificent Seven	74.050	9th Place Open Class Finalist
1986		Concerto to End All Concertos * Catavento * Return of the Magnificent Seven * They Call the Wind Maria * Greatest Love of All * Magnificent Seven	73.400	12th Place Open Class
1987		Theme (from An American Tail) * Market Street * Begin the Beguine * They Call the Wind Maria (from Paint Your Wagon) * Magnificent Seven	82.600	10th Place Open Class Finalist
1988		Magnificent Seven Suite * Requiem for the Masses * Platoon * America the Beautiful * Market Place * Begin the Beguine * Try to Remember (from The Fantasticks) * The Way We Were * Magnificent Seven	81.040	9th Place Open Class Finalist
1989		Buddy Rich Tribute; Bugle Call Rag & Willowcrest * West Side Story Medley; Maria, Somewhere, & Something's Coming * Magnificent Seven * Hang 'Em High * Magnificent Seven (reprise)	82.000	11th Place Open Class
1990		Night on Bald Mountain * Pictures at an Exhibition * Swing Street * Cleanin' Up the Town * Wind Beneath My Wings * Magnificent Seven	85.900	10th Place Open Class Finalist
1991		Bewitched, Bothered and Bewildered * That Old Black Magic * Umulu * Symphonie Fantastique	90.500	5th Place Open Class Finalist
1992		Gospel John * Make His Praise Glorious * Pour On the Power * Amazing Grace * Maybe God Is Tryin' to Tell You Something	93.200	4th Place Open Class Finalist
1993	Ben Hur	"Ben Hur"... Theme Song * Prologue * Adoration of the Magi * The Rowing of the Galley Slaves * The Naval Battle * Chorale * Finale	91.200	5th Place Open Class Finalist
1994	Ben Hur	"Ben Hur"... Theme Song * Prologue * Adoration of the Magi * Rowing of the Galley Slaves * Naval Battle * Finale	89.900	5th Place Open Class Finalist
1995		"Hurcs Through the Years"... Stormy Weather * Rhapsody in Blue/Concerto in "F" medley by Gershwin * They Call the Wind Maria * Magnificent Seven	90.600	5th Place Open Class Finalist
1996		To Die For (from The Lion King) * Hippo Attack (from Congo) * Bail Out (from Congo) * Umulu * Medley (from The Lion King)	84.000	9th Place Open Class Finalist
1997		Sophisticated Lady * It Don't Mean a Thing If It Ain't Got That Swing * Caravan * Autumn Leaves * Magnificent Seven	87.600	6th Place Open Class Finalist
1998		Baroque Samba * Stella by Starlight * Swing, Swing, Swing (from 1941)	87.700	7th Place Open Class Finalist
1999	Vision of the American West	"Vision of the American West"... Magnificent Seven Suite * Hang 'Em High	90.100	6th Place Open Class Finalist
2000	Celtic Pride: Music from Far and Away	"Celtic Pride: Music from Far and Away"... The Land Race (from Far and Away) * Greensleeves * Fantasia on the Dargason (from Second Suite in F) * Joseph and Shannon * Blowing Off Steam -drum solo * Finale (from Far and Away)	91.300	6th Place Open Class Finalist
2001	Storm Warning	"Storm Warning"...You Are My Sunshine (jazz version) * Stormy Weather (from Stormy Weather) * Hurricane (drum solo) * Come In from the Rain * Somewhere Over the Rainbow	85.100	10th Place Open Class Finalist
2002	A Tribute to American Composers	"A Tribute to American Composers" - Fanfare for the Common Man * Symphony #3, Mvt. 3 * Agnus Dei (from Adagio for Strings) * Ballet Sacra	88.000	8th Place Open Class Finalist
2003	Hurcs in Vegas	"Hurcs in Vegas"... Godzilla Eats Las Vegas * Viva Las Vegas * Theme from "I Dream of Jeannie" * Magnificent Seven * Bacchanal * I'll Be Seeing You * Heartbreak Hotel	83.475	11th Place Open Class
2004	The Hurcs 50th Anniversary Celebration : The Magnificent 50	Rhapsody in Blue by George Gershwin / Make His Praise Glorious by Bill Wolaver / The Storm by John Meehan	84.475	9th Place Open Class Finalist
2005	The Year It all Began	"The Year It All Began"... Frankie Machine (from The Man with the Golden Arm) * To Kill a Mockingbird	84.425	10th Place Open Class Finalist
2006	Jesus Christ Superstar	"Jesus Christ Superstar"... Heaven on Their Minds * Everything's Alright * Jesus Must Die * Trial Before Pilate * John Nineteen Forty One * Superstar	86.738	7th Place Open Class Finalist
2007	The Music of Leonard Bernstein	"The Music of Leonard Bernstein"...On the Waterfront * Mambo (from West Side Story) * Make Our Garden Grow (from Candide) * Overture to Candide	92.488	7th Place Open Class Finalist
2008	Journey West	"Journey West"... Billy the Kid * Shenandoah * They Call the Wind Maria * Hoedown * Magnificent Seven	94.913	4th Place Open Class Finalist
2009	The Gold Rush	"The Gold Rush"... Gates of Gold: Call of the Mountain * Theme from Can-Can * The Red Pony * Grover's Corners (from Our Town) * Silverado	95.838	4th Place Open Class Finalist
2010	Heaven Sent	"Heaven Sent"... Gloria * Joyful, Joyful We Adore Thee * God Said (from Bernstein's Mass) * Before the Throne of God Above * Gloria	95.338	4th Place Open Class Finalist
2011	Gersshwin: Old, New and Blue	"Gershwin: Old, New, and Blue"... Porgy and Bess * Concerto in F * Rhapsody in Blue * But Not for Me * Fascinating Rhythm	94.350	4th Place Open Class Finalist
2012	Blokes and Birds	"Blokes and Birds"... Rule Britannia * Downtown * Georgy Girl * Windy * First Suite in E-Flat * Greensleeves * Water Music * Major Modern General (drum solo) * Crown Imperial * The Windmills of Your Mind * Fantasia on the Dargason (from Second Suite in F) * Turn, Turn * God Save the Queen * A Young Person's Guide to the Orchestra	93.180	4th Place Open Class Finalist
2013	Rage Against the Machine	"Rage Against the Machine"... Enter the Machine * The Machine (from the Fifth Symphony) * Mechanical Love (from Bicentennial Man) * Sam at the Lake (from Transformers) * Revenge of the Fallen * Flynn Lives (from Tron Legacy) * My Name Is Lincoln (from The Island)	84.850	9th Place Open Class Finalist
2014	Always Greener	"Always Greener"... The Promise of Living (from Tender Land) * They Call the Wind Maria (from Paint Your Wagon) * Children's Dance (from Merry Mount Suite) * Make Our Garden Grow (from Candide) * Magnificent Seven	87.350	8th Place Open Class Finalist
2015	After Hours	"After Hours"...Sing Sing Sing * Since I Don't Have You * Nutville * Harlem Nocturne * Jump Jive an' Wail	83.800	10th Place Open Class Finalist
2016	Freedom	"Freedom"...Amazing Grace * Freedom * Nelle Tue Mani (from The Gladiator) * Freedom Trilogy	82.250	13th Place Open Class
2017	Porgy and Bess	"Porgy & Bess" - My Man's Gone Now (from Porgy and Bess) * Summertime (from Porgy and Bess) * Bess, You Is My Woman Now (from Porgy and Bess) * It Ain't Necessarily So (from Porgy and Bess) * Oh, Lord, I'm On My Way (from Porgy and Bess)	79.775	13th Place Open Class
2018	Clash Atop Olympus	"Clash Atop Olympus"...Kronos and the Overthrow * Poseidon * Hades * Zeus (King of Gods)	85.275	9th Place Open Class Finalist
2019	The Deadly Seven	"The Deadly Seven"...Pride (with Ave Maria) * Sloth/Gluttony * Greed * Lust * Envy and Wrath	84.150	8th Place Open Class Finalist
2020	Season cancelled due to COVID-19 Pandemic			
2021	Brought to Light	"Brought to Light"...Discover (Leap) * Expose (Prelude to Being Faster) * Emerge (But I will Always be Faster)	85.450	7th Place Open Class Finalist
2022	Journey Home	"Journey Home"...Home * Call to Adventure * Challenges and Temptations * Both Sides Now	89.450	1st Place Open Class Champion
2023	Channel Green	"Channel Green"...Stormy Weather * Blowin' in the Wind * White Rabbit * Rocket Man	89.400	1st Place Open Class Champion
2024	Angel Of Vengeance	"Angel Of Vengeance"...Gangsta's Paradise * Seven Angels of Vengeance * The Lonely Shepherd * Medea's Dance of Vengeance	86.800	5th Place World Class
2025	The Black Parade	The Grotto by Nick Steinbach, Jina An, & Paul Dinleti / Fallout by Thoma sJ. Bergersen & Nick Phoenix / Hi-Lo by Amy Lee & Will B. Hunt / Welcome to the Black Parade by Bob Bryar, Frank Iero, Ray Toro, Gerard Way, & Mikey Way	87.725	5th Place World Class
2025	The Black Parade	The Grotto by Nick Steinbach, Jina An, & Paul Dinleti / Fallout by Thoma sJ. Bergersen & Nick Phoenix / Hi-Lo by Amy Lee & Will B. Hunt / Welcome to the Black Parade by Bob Bryar, Frank Iero, Ray Toro, Gerard Way, & Mikey Way	89.550	6th Place All-Age Finalist
2026	The Storm	Hand Covers Bruise by Trent Reznor / They Call the Wind Mariah by Alan J. Lerner & Frederick Loewe / Timestorm from "Stormworks" by Stephen Millio / Call of Silence by Hiroyuki Sawano		
