= List of drum and bugle corps =

The following is a list of drum and bugle corps. A junior corps is any corps restricted to members age 22 and under, while an all-age corps (also known as a senior corps) does not have any such age requirement.

== Junior corps ==
Corps	Location	Years active	Website
7th Regiment	New London, Connecticut	2003–present	Official website
27th Lancers	Revere, Massachusetts	1967–1986	Official website
The Academy	Tempe, Arizona	2001–present	Official website
Anaheim Kingsmen	Anaheim, California	1963–1986	Official website
Argonne Rebels	Great Bend, Kansas	1948–1979; 1983–1984	
Arsenal	El Paso, Texas	2016-present	Official website
The Battalion	Salt Lake City, Utah	2014–present	Official website
Bleu Raeders	New Orleans, Louisiana	1971–1980	
Blue Devils	Concord, California	1970–present	Official website
Blue Devils B	Concord, California	1975–present	Official website
Blue Devils C	Concord, California	1975–present	Official website
Blue Knights	Denver, Colorado	1958–present	Official website
Blue Stars	La Crosse, Wisconsin	1964–present	Official website
Bluecoats	Canton, Ohio	1972–present	Official website
Boise Gems	Boise, Idaho	2022–present	Official website
Boston Crusaders	Boston, Massachusetts	1940–present	Official website
The Cadets	Erie, Pennsylvania	1934–2024	Official website
Capital Regiment	Columbus, Ohio	1999–present	Official website
Carolina Crown	Fort Mill, South Carolina	1988–present	Official website
The Cavaliers	Rosemont, Illinois	1948–present	Official website
Colts	Dubuque, Iowa	1963–present	Official website
Colt Cadets	Dubuque, Iowa	1967–present	Official website
Columbians	Tri-Cities, Washington	2012–present	Official website
Crossmen	San Antonio, Texas	1975–present	Official website
Genesis	Austin, Texas	2009–present	Official website
Glassmen	Toledo, Ohio	1961–2012	Official website
Gold	Oceanside, California	2005–present	Official website
Golden Empire	Bakersfield, California	2013–present	Official website
Guardians	Dallas, Texas	2012–present	Official website
Heat Wave	Tampa Bay, Florida	2014–present	Official website
Impulse!	Buena Park, California	1998–present	Official website
Jersey Surf	Berlin, New Jersey	1990–present	Official website
Les Stentors	Sherbrooke, Quebec	1987–present	Official website
Madison Scouts	Madison, Wisconsin	1920–1925; 1938–Present	Official website
Magic of Orlando	Orlando, Florida	1991–1999; 2002–2006	
Mandarins	Sacramento, California	1963–present	Official Website
Music City	Nashville, Tennessee	2009–present	Official website
Oregon Crusaders	Portland, Oregon	2001–2019	Official website
Pacific Crest	Diamond Bar, California	1993–present	Official website
Phantom Regiment	Rockford, Illinois	1956–present	Official website
Pioneer	Milwaukee, Wisconsin	1964–2018	Official website
Racine Scouts	Racine, Wisconsin	1927–present	Official Website
Raiders	Burlington, New Jersey	1990–present	Official website
River City Rhythm	Anoka, Minnesota	2014–present	Official website
Santa Clara Vanguard	Santa Clara, California	1967–present	Official website
Seattle Cascades	Seattle, Washington	1957–present	Official website
Sky Ryders	Hutchinson, Kansas	1955–1993	Official website
Southwind	Mobile, Alabama	1980–2023	Official website
Spartans	Nashua, New Hampshire	1955–present	Official website
Spirit of Atlanta	Atlanta, Georgia	1976–present	Official website
Star of Indiana	Bloomington, Indiana	1985–1993	Official website
Suncoast Sound	Pinellas Park, Florida	1979–1995	Official website
Troopers	Casper, Wyoming	1957–present	Official website
Vanguard Cadets	Santa Clara, California	1971–present	Official website
Velvet Knights	Anaheim, California	1972–1996	
Vessel	Inland Empire, California	1997–present	Official website
Watchmen	Riverside, California	2013–present	Official website

== All-age corps ==
Corps	Location	Years active	Website
Atlanta CV	Duluth, Georgia	1997–present	Official website
Buccaneers	Reading, Pennsylvania	1957–present	Official website
Bushwackers	Princeton, New Jersey	1980–present	Official website
Carolina Gold	Greensboro, North Carolina	2000–present	Official website
Cincinnati Tradition	Cincinnati, Ohio	1984–present	Official website
Columbus Saints	Columbus, Ohio	2003–present	Official website
Crusaders Senior Corps	Boston, Massachusetts	1991–present	Official website
Empire Statesmen	Rochester, New York	1983–2013	Official website
Erie Thunderbirds	Erie, Pennsylvania	1956–1984; 1991–present	Official website
Fusion Core	Morris County, New Jersey	2007–present	Official website
Future Corps	Orlando, Florida	1982–2006	
Govenaires	Saint Peter, Minnesota	1927–present	Official website
Hanover Lancers	Hanover, Pennsylvania	1920–present	Official website
Hawthorne Caballeros	Hawthorne, New Jersey	1946–present	Official website
Hurricanes	Ansonia, Connecticut	1955–present	Official website
Kidsgrove Scouts	Kidsgrove, England	1910–present	
Kilties	Racine, Wisconsin	1934–present	Official website
Marty's Goldenaires	Bessemer, MI	1950-present	Official website
Minnesota Brass	St. Paul, Minnesota	1947–present	Official website
Northern Lights	Muskegon, Michigan	2023–present	Official website
Reading Buccaneers	Reading, Pennsylvania	1957–present	Official website
Rogues Hollow Regiment	Doylestown, Ohio	2015–present	Official website
Skyliners	Scranton, Pennsylvania	1945–present	Official website
Southern Knights	Birmingham, Alabama	2015–present	Official website
Sunrisers	Long Island, New York	1954–present	Official website
Syracuse Brigadiers	Syracuse, New York	1938–2009	Official website
White Sabers	Dansville, New York	1928–1980; 1994–present	Official website

== Military corps ==
Corps	Location	Years active	Website
Brazilian Marine Pipes, Drum and Bugle Corps	Rio de Janeiro	1822–present	
Philippine Marine Corps Drum and Bugle Team	Makati, Metro Manila	1963–present	
"The Commandant's Own"	Washington, D.C.	1934–present	Official website
United States Air Force Academy Drum and Bugle Corps	Colorado Springs, Colorado	1948–present	Official website
United States Naval Academy Drum and Bugle Corps	Annapolis, Maryland	1914–present	Official website

== See also ==
- List of Drum Corps International member corps
- List of defunct Drum Corps International member corps
