= List of Drum Corps International member corps =

The following is a list of current drum corps competing as members of Drum Corps International (DCI).

== Member corps ==
=== World Class members ===
Corps	Location	Website
The Academy	Tempe, Arizona	arizonaacademy.org
The Battalion	Salt Lake City, Utah	battalioncorps.org
Blue Devils	Concord, California	bluedevils.org
Blue Knights	Denver, Colorado	ascendperformingarts.org
Blue Stars †	La Crosse, Wisconsin	bluestars.org
Bluecoats	Canton, Ohio	bluecoats.com
Boston Crusaders †	Boston, Massachusetts	crusaders.com
Carolina Crown	Fort Mill, South Carolina	carolinacrown.org
The Cavaliers †	Rosemont, Illinois	cavaliers.org
Colts	Dubuque, Iowa	colts.org
Crossmen	San Antonio, Texas	crossmen.org
Gold	Oceanside, California	golddrumcorps.org
Madison Scouts †	Madison, Wisconsin	madisonscouts.org
Mandarins	Sacramento, California	mandarins.org
Music City	Nashville, Tennessee	musiccityyouth.org
Pacific Crest	Diamond Bar, California	pacific-crest.org
Phantom Regiment	Rockford, Illinois	regiment.org
Santa Clara Vanguard †	Santa Clara, California	scvanguard.org
Seattle Cascades	Seattle, Washington	seattlecascades.org
Spartans	Nashua, New Hampshire	spartansdbc.org
Spirit of Atlanta	Atlanta, Georgia	spiritofatlanta.org
Troopers †	Casper, Wyoming	troopersdrumcorps.org

† = One of the thirteen charter members of Drum Corps International.

=== Open Class members ===
Corps	Location	Website
7th Regiment	New London, Connecticut	7thregiment.org
Blue Devils B	Concord, California	bluedevils.org
Blue Devils C	Concord, California	bluedevils.org
Colt Cadets	Dubuque, Iowa	colts.org
Columbians	Pasco, Washington	columbiansdrumcorps.org
Golden Empire	Bakersfield, California	geperformingarts.org
Guardians	Mckinney, Texas	guardiansyoutharts.org
Heat Wave	Tampa, Florida	heat-wave.org
Impulse!	Buena Park, California	impulseyoutharts.org
Les Stentors	Sherbrooke, Quebec, Canada	stentors.org
Memphis Blues	Memphis, Tennessee	memphisbluesdc.org
Raiders	Burlington, New Jersey	raidersdbc.org
River City Rhythm	Anoka, Minnesota	rivercityrhythm.org
Zephyrus	Tulsa, Oklahoma	zephyrusarts.org

=== All-Age Class members ===
Corps	Location	Website
Atlanta CV	Atlanta, Georgia	atlantacv.org
Bushwackers	Princeton, New Jersey	bushwackers.org
Cincinnati Tradition	Cincinnati, Ohio	cincinnatitradition.org
Columbus Saints	Columbus, Ohio	columbussaints.org
Connecticut Hurricanes	Seymour, Connecticut	cthurricanes.org
Fusion Core	Windermere, Florida	fusioncore.org
Govenaires	St. Peter, Minnesota	govenaires.org
Hawthorne Caballeros	Hawthorne, New Jersey	hawthornecaballeros.org
Minnesota Brass	St. Paul, Minnesota	mnbrass.org/corps/
Northern Lights	Muskegon, Michigan	www.northernlightsmi.org
Reading Buccaneers	Reading, Pennsylvania	readingbuccaneers.org
Rogues Hollow Regiment	Doylestown, Ohio	rogueshollowregiment.com
Sunrisers	Long Island, New York	sunrisersdbc.org
White Sabers	Rochester, New York	whitesabers.org

== Inactive corps ==
Below is a list of corps who are considered temporarily inactive and plan on returning to competition:

Corps	Location	Inactive	Website
Genesis	Austin, Texas	2026	genesisdbc.org
Jersey Surf	Camden County, New Jersey	2025	jerseysurf.org
Vanguard Cadets	Santa Clara, California	2023	scvanguard.org
Vessel	San Dimas, California	2025	vesseldrumcorps.org

== See also ==
- List of drum corps
