= Future Corps =

The Future Corps

Background information
- Also known as: Encorps
- Genres: Drum and Bugle Corps
- Years active: Dec 1, 1982 - May 13, 2000

The Future Corps was a group of musicians who performed high energy instrumental music in the drum and bugle corps style, primarily at the Epcot theme park at Walt Disney World. Made up entirely of brass players and percussionists, members were largely from competitive drum corps. Disney provided the instruments, and the group's futuristic costumes were designed and maintained by the Walt Disney World costume department. Special outfits were sometimes worn for performances around holidays such as Christmas. A similar group called the Magic Kingdom Korps also played at Disneyland, alternating stints as both a seasonal and a full-time group.

== History ==
Future Corps first performed on December 1, 1982 and began an almost 18-year run as a full-time atmosphere group (7 shows per day, 5 days per week) until May 2000, when the group became the latest victim of a massive round of entertainment layoffs. One Disney manager commented that the Future Corps "ran longer than Cats." The group was the second such brass and percussion band after the Future World Brass to play at Epcot.

The name Future Corps is simply a word combination of Epcot's Future World and Drum Corps. When group members performed together, outside the Disney parks, they used the name Encorps. The name of the group's one and only album The Future of Corps, was so named as a simple way to get a form of the group's copyrighted name onto their self-produced CD, not to suggest any connection to the future of the drum corps activity.

Over the years the group occasionally included a mallet player, a 4-person color guard, an 11-man cymbal section, a full size pit percussion setup, extra brass players for the Indycar race, and even a keyboard/guitar/electric bass setup for special performances like the Disney Ambassador ceremony and the Goofy Games, as well as Epcot's short-lived circus.

The corps has appeared on television for a live New Years Celebration broadcast for a Japanese TV station, served as the show band for two Live with Regis and Kathie Lee shows at Epcot, and appeared on Good Morning America. The group has traveled to DCI Championships in '83, '92, and '94-'98, performed at the Music Educators' National Convention three times in various cities, and performed at both the International Association of Jazz Educators convention in Atlanta, GA and the Percussive Arts Society International Convention in Orlando, FL. Future Corps was flown to New York City to perform with many Disney groups from both CA and FL at the world premier of Pocahontas in Central Park. They were also invited to travel as guest artists for Dynasty Music Products to a marching music festival in Okayama, Japan in '97, which included a tour stops in Yokohama and Kyoto, as well as a day of performances at Tokyo Disney. In October 2000, nearly 6 months after the group was disbanded, the group's one and only "reunion" performance took place, once again in Okayama, Japan.

== Discography ==
- Future of Corps - 1991, Encorps Production. Recorded at James Madison University

== See also ==
- Drum Corps International
