= Cincinnati Tradition Drum and Bugle Corps =

Drum and bugle corps based in Ohio, US

Cincinnati Tradition
- Location: Cincinnati, Ohio
- Division: DCA Open Class (2010-2023) DCI All-Age Open Class (2024-2025) DCI All-Age Consolidated Class (2026)
- Founded: 1984; 42 years ago
- Director: Andrea Meyer
- Championship titles: 2016–17 (A Class) 2024-25 (Open Class)
- Website: cincinnatitradition.org

The Cincinnati Tradition Drum and Bugle Corps is an all-age drum and bugle corps based in Cincinnati, Ohio, United States. The corps was an active member of Drum Corps Associates (DCA), which eventually merged into the DCI All-Age Circuit. Cincinnati Tradition holds 2 DCA Championship titles as well as being the All-Age Open Class 2024 and 2025 World Champions, for a total of 4 championship wins.

The corps has maintained a presence in Tri-state area since its founding.

== History ==
The corps was founded by Tom Slade and Dan Hartwig in 1984. The corps acquired percussion and brass instruments from Silver Spectrum and Pride of Cincinnati Drum and Bugle Corps. Prior to 2009, the corps was not competitive, performing primarily as a parade corps and in exhibition at events within the Cincinnati metropolitan area.

In 2010, the corps became an active member of DCA. The corps was a Class A finalist in 2014 and 2015, and class champions in 2016 and 2017. The corps advanced to Open Class in 2018, finishing the year in eighth place.

== Show summary (1985–2026) ==
Key
Gold background indicates DCA Class A Champion
Pale blue background indicates DCA Class A Finalist
Blue background indicates DCA Open Class Finalist

Gold background indicates DCA Championship; Pale blue background indicates DCA Finalist.

Year	Repertoire	Score	Placement
1985	Alabama Jubilee by George L. Cobb & Jack Yellen / Way Down Yonder in New Orleans by Turner Layton / You'll Never Walk Alone (from Carousel) by Richard Rodgers & Oscar Hammerstein II	No scored competitions	
1986	Selection from Spain by Chick Corea / Hang 'Em High by Dominic Frontiere / Theme from The Flintstones by David Newman / You'll Never Walk Alone (from Carousel) by Richard Rodgers & Oscar Hammerstein II	No scored competitions	
1987–98	Corps inactive		
1999	A Tribute to Tom Slade Sr. You'll Never Walk Alone (from Carousel) by Richard Rodgers & Oscar Hammerstein II / Selections from Concierto de Aranjuez by Joaquín Rodrigo / Selection from A Trumpeter's Prayer by Salvador Camarata / Amazing Grace (Traditional) / God Bless America (from This Is the Army) by Ray Heindorf & Max Steiner	No scored competitions	
2000	Selections from The Nightmare Before Christmas by Danny Elfman / Selections from Something in the Wind by Johnny Green / Olympic Fanfare and Theme by John Williams	No scored competitions	
2001	Selections from The Nightmare Before Christmas by Danny Elfman / The Burning Bush & Deliver Us (from The Prince of Egypt) by Hans Zimmer	No scored competitions	
2002	American Themes; The Stars and Stripes Forever by John Philip Sousa / God Bless America (from This Is the Army) by Ray Heindorf & Max Steiner / Olympic Fanfare and Theme by John Williams / Taps (Traditional)	No scored competitions	
2003	JAZZ in the CITY! Fantasy by Maurice & Verdine White and Eddie del Barrio / Birdland (by Joe Zawinul / MacArthur Park by Jimmy Webb"	No scored competitions	
2004	Heritage; American Heritage March by Frank Marsales / Irish Tune from County Derry by Percy Grainger / Shaker Melody (from Appalachian Spring) by Aaron Copland	No scored competitions	
2005	Jazz in the 'Nati "In the Stone" (from I Am) by Allee Willis, David Foster and Maurice White / "Land of Make Believe" (from Land of Make Believe) / "Gospel John" (from Chameleon) by Jeffrey Steinberg"In the Stone" (from I Am) by Allee Willis, David Foster and Maurice White / "Land of Make Believe" (from Land of Make Believe) / "Gospel John" (from Chameleon) by Jeffrey Steinberg	No scored competitions	
2006	Law & Order; Theme from Peter Gunn by Henry Mancini / Theme from The Naked Gun by Ira Newborn / Them from Mission: Impossible by Lalo Schifrin / "Live and Let Die" by Paul & Linda McCartneyTheme from Peter Gunn by Henry Mancini / Theme from The Naked Gun by Ira Newborn / Them from Mission: Impossible by Lalo Schifrin / "Live and Let Die" by Paul & Linda McCartney	No scored competitions	
2007	"Drop It Like It's Hot" (from R&G: The Masterpiece) by Chad Hugo, Calvin Broadus and Pharrell Williams / "Legend of the One-Eyed Sailor" (from Land of Make Believe) by Chuck Mangione / Selection from Channel One Suite by Bill Reddie"Drop It Like It's Hot" (from R&G: The Masterpiece) by Chad Hugo, Calvin Broadus and Pharrell Williams / "Legend of the One-Eyed Sailor" (from Land of Make Believe) by Chuck Mangione / Selection from Channel One Suite by Bill Reddie	No scored competitions	
2008	Tradición Hispania "Bully" by Mike Simpson / "Malagueña" by Ernesto Lecuona"Bully" by Mike Simpson / "Malagueña" by Ernesto Lecuona	No scored competitions	
2009	Fun with Chuck "Echano" and "Bellavia" (from Children of Sanchez), and "Land of Make Believe" and "Legend of the One-Eyed Sailor" (from Land of Make Believe) by Chuck Mangione"Echano" and "Bellavia" (from Children of Sanchez), and "Land of Make Believe" and "Legend of the One-Eyed Sailor" (from Land of Make Believe) by Chuck Mangione	No scored competitions	
2010	Tradición Hispania, Segunda Parte "Bully" by Mike Simpson / "One More Time Chuck Corea" arranged by Gene Puerling / Theme from Zorro by George Bruns and Norman Foster"Bully" by Mike Simpson / "One More Time Chuck Corea" arranged by Gene Puerling / Theme from Zorro by George Bruns and Norman Foster	67.675	10th (Class A)
2011	El Corazón de Andalucía; Theme from Zorro by George Bruns and Norman Foster / "Diego's Goodbye" and "Zorro's Theme" (from The Mask of Zorro) by James Horner / Malaga by Stan KentonTheme from Zorro by George Bruns and Norman Foster / "Diego's Goodbye" and "Zorro's Theme" (from The Mask of Zorro) by James Horner / Malaga by Stan Kenton	67.530	9th (Class A)
2012	An Evening with Stan Kenton "Here's That Rainy Day", "Artistry in Rhythm Suite", "Send in the Clowns" and "Malaga 2012" by Stan Kenton"Here's That Rainy Day", "Artistry in Rhythm Suite", "Send in the Clowns" and "Malaga 2012" by Stan Kenton	71.680	6th (Class A)
2013	Breakdown; Joy (from Awakening: Songs of the Earth) by Joseph Curiale / "Get Happy" by Harold Arlen and Ted Koehler / "Resistance" (from The Resistance) by Matt Bellamy / "Creep" (from Pablo Honey) by Thom Yorke / "Welcome to the Masquerade" (from Welcome to the Masquerade) by Steve Augustine, Joel Bruyere and Trevor McNevanJoy (from Awakening: Songs of the Earth) by Joseph Curiale / "Get Happy" by Harold Arlen and Ted Koehler / "Resistance" (from The Resistance) by Matt Bellamy / "Creep" (from Pablo Honey) by Thom Yorke / "Welcome to the Masquerade" (from Welcome to the Masquerade) by Steve Augustine, Joel Bruyere and Trevor McNevan	76.300	7th (Class A)
2014	Finding Home; Fanfare and Allegro by Clifton Williams / Scramble by Todd Salter / "Shenandoah Gifts" (arrangement) / American Salute by Morton Gould	75.050	4th Place; Class A Finalist
2015	Both Sides Now; Thnks fr th Mmrs (from Infinity on High) by Pete Wentz & Patrick Stump / "Both Sides, Now" (from Clouds) by Joni Mitchell / "The Pretender" (from Echoes, Silence, Patience & Grace) by Dave Grohl and Taylor HawkinsThnks fr th Mmrs (from Infinity on High) by Pete Wentz & Patrick Stump / "Both Sides, Now" (from Clouds) by Joni Mitchell / "The Pretender" (from Echoes, Silence, Patience & Grace) by Dave Grohl and Taylor Hawkins	73.650	4th Place; Class A Finalist
2016	Invictus; Honor (from The Pacific) / New Frontier by Greg Danner/ Fairest Lord Jesus (Traditional)	80.030	1st Place; Class A Champion
2017	LIFT "Komm, süßer Tod, komm selge Ruh" by Johann Sebastian Bach / "Don't Give Up" (from So) by Peter Gabriel and Kate Bush / Aurora Awakes by John Mackey"Komm, süßer Tod, komm selge Ruh" by Johann Sebastian Bach / "Don't Give Up" (from So) by Peter Gabriel and Kate Bush / Aurora Awakes by John Mackey	82.700	1st Place; Class A Champion
2018	Event Horizon; Beyond the Horizon by Rossano Galante, Selections form Interstellar by Hans Zimmer, Raise the Roof by Michael Daugherty, Sheltering Sky by John Mackey	86.400	8th Place; Open Class; Finalist
2019	Aqueous; Phrygian Gates by John Adams, Without Warning by Stephen Melillo, Sanctuary by Frank Ticheli, The Wind River by Joseph Curiale	87.375	7th Place; Open Class; Finalist
2020	Season cancelled due to the COVID-19 pandemic		
2021	Grunt; War Pigs by Tommy Iommi, Ozzy Osbourne, Geezer Butler, & Bill Ward, Many Mothers by Tom Holkenborg, Journey to the Center of the Earth by Peter Graham	86.600	5th Place; Open Class; Finalist
2022	Soirée; Love Theme (from Romeo and Juliet) by Pyotr Ilych Tchaikovsky, Masquerade (from Phantom of the Opera) by Andrew Lloyd Webber, Girls Just Wanna Have Fun by Robert Hazard, Chandelier by Sia	83.350	3rd Place; Open Class; Finalist
2023	Overgrown; Original Music by Kevin LaBeouf	84.625	4th Place; Open Class; Finalist
2024	From a Stone; In the Stone by Allee Willis, David Foster & Maurice White / Symphony No. 40 by Wolfgang Amadeus Mozart / Reelin' in the Years by Walter Becker & Donald Fagen / Golden Hour by JVKE / Anvil Chorus from Il Trovatore by Giuseppe Verdi	87.475	1st Place; Open Class; Champion
2025	CincinnatUS; Knights of Cydonia by Muse / Take Me Home, Country Roads by John Denver / Who Wants To Live Forever by Queen	90.025 Open Class; 90.950 All Age Finals	1st Place; Open Class; Champion; 5th Place; All Age Finalist
2026	Chambers; Cornfield Chase by Hans Zimmer / Carmen: Danse Bohéme by Georges Bizet / Chasing the Goose by Karl Jenkins / Carmen: Habanera by Georges Bizet / And So It Goes by Billy Joel / Transcendence of the Heart by CJ Barrow, Michael Miller, and Alex Beltran (Original Music)	92.200	5th Place; All Age Class; Finalist
