= White Sabers Drum and Bugle Corps =

New York Drum & Bugle Corps

White Sabers Drum & Bugle Corps
- Location: Gates, NY
- Division: Class A (2005–14); Open Class (2015–2021, 2023-Present); World Class (2022)
- Founded: 1928; 98 years ago
- Corps Director: Ben Chaffee
- Championship titles: DCA Class A: 2013, 2014
- Website: whitesabers.org

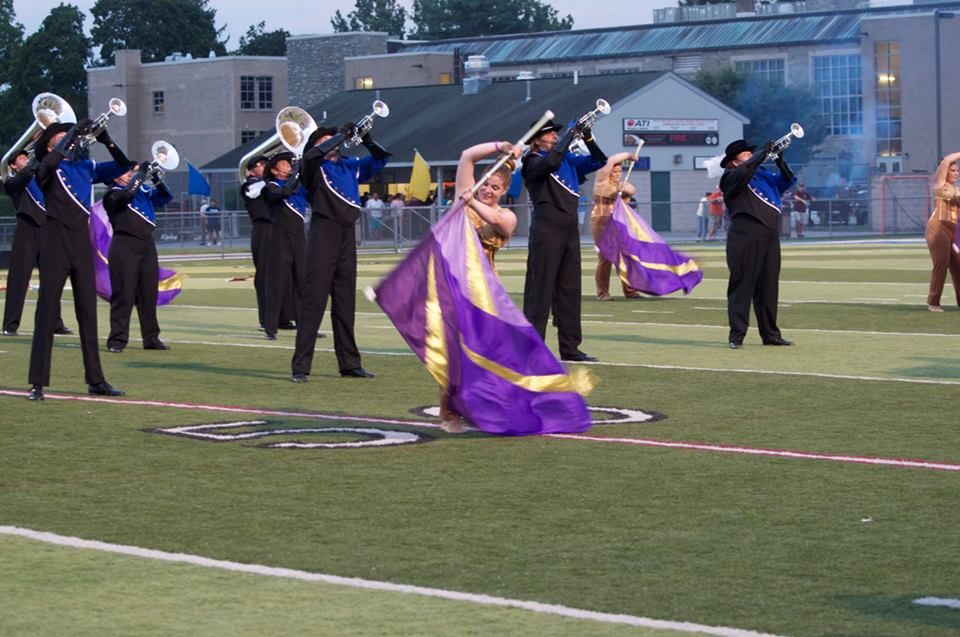

White Sabers Drum & Bugle Corps is an all-age competitive drum and bugle corps based in Gates, NY. Founded in 1928, the corps has a long history as a parade corps. White Sabers is a two-time DCA Class A World Champion (2013, 2014), a perennial DCA Open Class finalist - achieving 4th place in 2019. The Corps began competing in DCA's new World Class in 2022.

The corps was formerly known as the American Legion New York Post #87 Drum and Bugle Corps.

== About ==
The Corps was founded in 1928 by the commander of the American Legion Post #87 in Dansville, New York (later renamed Daniel Goho, Inc. New York Post #87). In 1957, the corps gained independence from the American Legion post, and continued to perform as a concert and parade corps under the name Dansville White Sabers.

The corps competed at the Red Carpet Association Championship in 1977. Sometime later the corps became inactive.

After "fourteen years" of inactivity, an alumni reunion in 1994 revived interest in a Dansville-based corps. In 2004, the corps became active again, but did not compete.

In 2005, the White Sabers joined DCA as a Class A corps, and placed sixth against ten other competitors. The corps was a Class A finalist in 2006 and 2012, and Class A champions in 2013 and 2014. Kevin Gamin described the corps' 2014 performance as "strong enough to have made Open Class finals." White Sabers advanced to Open Class in 2015, and were finalists every year they were a part of Open Class. 2015 Executive Director Leslie Amico was awarded Open Class "Director of the Year."

In 2022, the Corps officially relocated from Dansville, NY to the Rochester suburb of Gates, NY. Also in 2022, DCA reclassified their competitive structure with the addition of a World Class—the White Sabers elected to compete in World Class, joining the Bushwackers, Reading Buccaneers, and Hawthorne Caballeros. Corps Director Ben Chaffee was awarded World Class "Director of the Year" in 2022. The corps reclassified to DCA Open Class for the 2023 season, finishing in 2nd by a narrow margin of 0.25 points while taking caption victories in Brass, Visual, and Guard, while Ben Chaffee was once again awarded "Director of the Year" this time in Open Class. After the 2023 DCA season, the White Sabers like other DCA corps became part of the new DCI All-Age class.

== Show Summary (2004–24) ==
Gold indicates DCA Championship; blue background indicates DCA class finalist.

Year	Theme	Repertoire	Score	Result
2004	—	Selection from Songs Without Words by Gustav Holst / "Moondance" by Van Morrison / Santana Medley/Yaleo (original) / "Tuxedo Junction" by Erskine Hawkins, Bill Johnson, and Julian Dash / "When Johnny Comes Marching Home" by Patrick Gilmore / "Malagueña" by Ernesto Lecuona	—	—
2005	Ain't It Rich: Music of Buddy Rich	Selections from Channel One Suite by Bill Reddie / "Space Shuttle" by John LaBarbera / "Mercy, Mercy, Mercy" by Josef Zawinul / "Something" by George Harrison / "Dancing Men" by John LaBarbera	68.738	6th (Class A)
2006	Cool Shades of Latin Jazz	"Feeling Good" by Leslie Bricusse and Anthony Newley / "Save the Last Dance for Me" by Doc Pomus and Mort Shuman / "Don't Cry for Me Argentina" by Andrew Lloyd Webber / "The Tiger of San Pedro" by John LaBarbera	76.513	2nd (Class A)
2007	The Gladiator	Fate of the Gods by Steven Reineke / "Mars" (from The Planets) by Gustav Holst / Selection from Troy by James Horner / Selection from Gladiator by Hans Zimmer	75.275	8th (Class A)
2008	Music of Robert W. Smith	Selections from: The Great Locomotive Chase, Twelve Seconds to the Moon, Into the Storm, Africa: Ceremony, Song and Ritual, The Ascension, and Declaration in Blue by Robert W. Smith	77.313	7th (Class A)
2009	The Music of Cirque du Soleil	Selections from La Nouba and Quidam by Benoit Jutras	68.313	6th (Class A)
2010	Cirque du Soleil	"Incantation" and "Ninkou Latora" (from Quidam) by Benoit Jutras / "Ombra" (from Dralion) by Violaine Corradi / "Reve Rouge" (from La Nouba) by Benoit Jutras / "Ravendhi" (from Dralion) by Benoit Jutras	73.425	8th (Class A)
2011	Rhapsody in Shades of Blue	"Blue Morning, Blue Day" by Foreigner / "Blue" by Eiffel 65 / "Devil with the Blue Dress On" by Mitch Ryder / "Blue Rondo à la Turk" by Dave Brubeck / Selection from Rhapsody in Blue by George Gershwin	72.700	7th (Class A)
2012	From Death 'Till Dawn	Selection from Danse macabre by Camille Saint-Saëns / Dies irae (from Requiem) by Wolfgang Amadeus Mozart / "Black Magic Woman" by Carlos Santana / "Love Potion No. 9" by Jerry Leiber and Mike Stoller / "Moondance" by Van Morrison	77.030	4th (Class A)
2013	Fanfare for a New World	Selections from: Fanfare for a New Era by Jack Stamp, Symphony No. 9 by Antonín Dvořák and Dance of the New World by Dana Wilson / "Overture" and "New World" from Selmasongs by Björk	85.930	1st (Class A)
2014	Arabian Nights	Selections from: Arabian Dances by Brian Balmages, Scheherazade by Nikolai Rimsky-Korsakov / "Misirlou" (traditional) / "Nights in White Satin" by The Moody Blues	88.600	1st (Class A)
2015	Incantation, Ritual and Danse	Selections from: The Rite of Spring by Igor Stravinsky, Incantation and Dance by John Barnes Chance / "Incantation" (from Quidam) by Benoit Jutras / "Uninvited" by Alanis Morissette / "Danse Bacchanale" (from Samson and Delilah) by Camille Saint-Saëns	88.330	8th (Open Class)
2016	Unrequited	Selections from: Piano Sonata No. 14 by Ludwig van Beethoven and Romeo and Juliet by Pyotr Ilyich Tchaikovsky / "Dance of the Knights" (from Romeo and Juliet) by Sergei Prokofiev / "Marche au supplice" (from Symphonie fantastique) by Hector Berlioz / No. 1. "Andante sostenuto" (from Symphony No. 4) by Pyotr Ilyich Tchaikovsky / II. “Allegretto" (from Symphony No. 7) by Ludwig van Beethoven / "My Immortal" by Evanescence	88.730	7th (Open Class)
2017	WaterwayS	Waterways by Ludovico Einaudi / Equus by Eric Whitacre / Rain by Brian Balmages / "Bridge over Troubled Water" by Paul Simon / Selections from Niagara Falls by Michael Daugherty	93.380	5th (Open Class)
2018	cONvErgence	Theme from Stranger Things by Kyle Dixon and Michael Stein / Asphalt Cocktail by John Mackey / "Say Something" by Ian Axel / Selection from The Firebird by Igor Stravinsky	91.738	7th (Open Class)
2019	007 - Becoming Bond	You Know My Name (from Casino Royale) / Welcome To Cuba (from Die Another Day) / Skyfall / Live and Let Die / Goldeneye	91.950	4th (Open Class)
2020		Season Cancelled due to COVID-19 Pandemic		
2021	Brave New World	Canon in D - Pachelbel / New World Symphony - Dvorak / Alone - Marshmello / Rise Up - Andrea Day / Ode to Joy - Beethoven	85.600	6th (Open Class)
2022	Heavy Metal	Iron Foundry by Alexander Mosolov / Enter Sandman, Nothing Else Matters, Battery, and For Whom the Bell Tolls All by Metallica / Gates of Gold by Joseph Curiale	90.800	4th (World Class)
2023	Invasion	The Hand of Fate, Pt. 1 (from Signs) by James Newton Howard / Lightning Field by John Mackey / The Darkest Day, Fire Storm, and The Day We Fight Back (from Independence Day) by David Arnold	89.150	2nd (Open Class)
2024	Aurora: Into the Night Sky	Of Our New Day Begun by Omar Thomas / Selections from Interstellar by Hans Zimmer / Drops of Jupiter (Tell Me) by Train / Blinding Lights by The Weeknd / Moonlight Sonata by Ludwig van Beethoven / Mars & Jupiter from The Planets by Gustav Holst / Airglow by Stellardrone	86.775	2nd Place; Open Class; Finalist
