= The Academy Drum and Bugle Corps =

Junior drum and bugle corps based in Tempe, Arizona

The Academy
- Location: Tempe, Arizona
- Division: World Class
- Founded: 2001
- Director: Josh Thye
- Championship titles: DCI Open Class: 2006
- Website: www.arizonaacademy.org

The Academy Drum and Bugle Corps is a World Class junior competitive drum and bugle corps based in Tempe, Arizona. The corps is a member of Drum Corps International (DCI).

== History ==
In 2001, a group gathered in the Phoenix, Arizona, area with the intent of starting a drum and bugle corps. They formed the Board of Directors of the Arizona Academy of the Performing Arts, a non-profit organization with the goal of "enhancing the culture of music, dance, and the performing arts in Arizona." They then formed The Academy Brass & Percussion Ensemble, which made numerous local appearances from 2001 to 2003, including at the Southwest Corps Connection.

In the summer of 2004, the corps added a color guard, changed the name to The Academy Drum and Bugle Corps, and entered the field of competition. They marched a short season of only four weeks and six shows in Arizona and California. The next year, the corps expanded its boundaries, performing in ten shows. In 2006, The Academy appeared in seven states, including the DCI Division II & III World Championships in Madison, Wisconsin, where the corps capped their season with the Division II title.

In 2007, The Academy moved into Division I (World Class) competition. In 2016, The Academy had their most successful season since moving to World Class. At the DCI World Championships in Indianapolis, The Academy placed 11th, becoming the first corps to make its Finals debut since the Seattle Cascades in 2002.

== Show summary (2001–2026) ==
Key
Goldenrod background indicates DCI Open Class Champion (Note: In 2006, The Academy competed in Division II, a tier which has since been renamed Open Class.)
Pale green background indicates DCI World Class Semifinalist (Note: In 2007, The Academy competed in Division I, and has competed since 2008 in World Class. These are the same tier, just renamed.)
Pale blue background indicates DCI World Class Finalist

Year	Repertoire	World Championships		Ref.
Year	Repertoire	Score	Placement	Ref.
2001	Excerpts from Drum Corps Past; Malambo (from Estancia) by Alberto Ginastera / Amber Waves by Morton Gould / When a Man Loves a Woman by Calvin Lewis & Andrew Wright	Did not attend World Championships		
2002	Ya Gotta Try by Sammy Nestico / Grand Canyon Fanfare by James Newton Howard / Cadillac of the Skies (from Empire of the Sun) by John Williams	Did not attend World Championships		
2003	A Young Person's Guide to the Orchestra by Benjamin Britten / Vide Cor Meum (from Hannibal) by Hans Zimmer / The Challenge & Promise (from Millennium Celebration) by Gavin Greenaway	Did not attend World Championships		
2004	Debut; Symphony for Brass and Percussion, Mvt. 3 by Alfred Reed / Chanson Mélancolique by Morley Calvert / Jubilation (from Symphony for Brass and Timpani) by Herbert Haufrecht	Did not attend World Championships		
2005	Piano Concerto No. 2 by Dmitri Shostakovich	Did not attend World Championships		
2006	¡danzón! Huapango by Jose Pablo Moncayo / Patria by Ruben Blades / El Cumbanchero by Rafael Hernández	95.625	1st Place; Division II & III; Champion	
2007	The Chase; The Chase, The Villain, The Hero, The Woman, At the Jitterbug Club, The Love Theme, The Chase & Conclusion; Original Music by the Staff of The Academy	84.500	13th Place; Division I Semifinalist	
2008	Vienna Nights; Freud’s Dream, Mozart’s Theme, Café Life, Gallop, Notturno & Finale - Alla Turka; All from Vienna Nights by Philip Wilby	78.850	18th Place; World Class	
2009	The Ascent; Call of the Mountain (from Gates of Gold) by Joseph Curiale / An Alpine Symphony, Op. 64 by Richard Strauss / Kingfishers Catch Fire by John Mackey	83.750	14th Place; World Class; Semifinalist	
2010	Strangers In Paradise; Overture (from Prince Igor) by Alexander Borodin / Aquarium (from The Carnival of the Animals) by Camille Saint-Saëns / Selections from Prince Igor & Polovstian Dances and Chorus (from Prince Igor) by Alexander Borodin	84.050	14th Place; World Class; Semifinalist	
2011	(RE); Little Fugue in G Minor by Johann Sebastian Bach / Lux Aurumque by Eric Whitacre / Fly by Ludovico Einaudi / Lollapalooza by John Adams	82.650	15th Place; World Class; Semifinalist	
2012	Left of Spring: Stravinsky Revisited; Rite of Spring by Igor Stravinsky / The Song of Purple Summer (from Spring Awakening) by Duncan Sheik & Steven Sater	81.900	15th Place; World Class; Semifinalist	
2013	Piano Man; Wilkommen (from Cabaret) by John Kander & Fred Ebb / Alabama Song by Kurt Weill & Bertolt Brecht / Falling In Love Again by Fredrick Hollander & Sammy Lerner / Piano Concerto No. 2, Mvt. 1 by Dmitri Shostakovich / Piano Man by Billy Joel	78.200	19th Place; World Class; Semifinalist	
2014	Vanity Fair; Rondeau by Jean-Joseph Mouret / Crown Imperial by William Walton / What a Wonderful World by Bob Thiele & George David Weiss / Dance of the Hours by Amilcare Ponchielli / Jazz Suite No. 2, Waltz No. 2 by Dmitri Shostakovich / Hungarian Rhapsody No. 2 by Franz Liszt / Symphony No. 7, Mvt. 2 by Ludwig van Beethoven / Paris Sketches by Martin Ellerby	81.875	16th Place; World Class; Semifinalist	
2015	A Step in Time; Overture & Chim Chim Cher-ee (both from Mary Poppins) by The Sherman Brothers / A Shooting Star (from Mary Poppins) by George Stiles, Anthony Drewe & The Sherman Brothers / A Spoonful of Sugar (from Mary Poppins) by The Sherman Brothers / Practically Perfect (from Mary Poppins) by George Stiles, Anthony Drewe & The Sherman Brothers / Galop (from Masquerade Suite) by Aram Khachaturian / Step in Time, Feed the Birds & Supercalifragilisticexpialidocious (all from Mary Poppins) by The Sherman Brothers	81.825	15th Place; World Class; Semifinalist	
2016	Drum Corpse Bride; Main Titles (from Corpse Bride) by Danny Elfman / Romeo and Juliet by Sergei Prokofiev / Sorcerer's Apprentice by Paul Dukas / Suggestion Diabolique by Sergei Prokofiev / Unchained Melody by Alex North & Hy Zaret / Piano Sonata No. 2, Op. 35 (The Funeral March) by Frédéric Chopin	86.100	11th Place; World Class; Finalist	
2017	By a Hare; Morning Mood (from Peer Gynt Suite) by Edvard Grieg / Hunting Wabbits by Gordon Goodwin / Overture to The Barber of Seville by Gioachino Rossini / Danse Bohème by Georges Bizet / Ride of the Valkyries by Richard Wagner / Habanera by Georges Bizet / Hungarian Rhapsody No. 2 by Franz Liszt / Anvil Chorus (from Il trovatore) by Giuseppe Verdi	84.188	14th Place; World Class; Semifinalist	
2018	Academic; The Imitation Game by Alexandre Desplat / Annie Lisle by H. S. Thompson / Academic Festival Overture by Johannes Brahms / Overture to The School for Scandal by Samuel Barber / The Four Sections by Steve Reich / Keating's Triumph (from Dead Poets Society) by Maurice Jarre	84.563	15th Place; World Class; Semifinalist	
2019	The Bridge Between; Dance 1, Mvt. 1 by Oliver Davis / Equilibrium by Paul Lovatt-Cooper / London Bridge Is Falling Down (Traditional) / Bridge over Troubled Water by Paul Simon / Horizons by Paul Lovatt-Cooper / Original music by Steven Vento	84.300	15th Place; World Class; Semifinalist	
2020	Season cancelled due to the COVID-19 pandemic			
2021	Exposed; Fame by David Bowie / Lingus by Michael League (Snarky Puppy) / Paparazzi by Lady Gaga / Bury a Friend by Billie Eilish & Finneas O'Connell / Everybody Hurts by R.E.M. / Rhapsody on a Theme of Paganini by Sergei Rachmaninoff / Hello It's Me by Lou Reed	No scored competitions		
2022	A World of My Creation; Prelude by Steve Vento / Alice's Theme by Danny Elfman / The Barber of Seville by Gioachino Rossini / Oompa Loompa (from Willy Wonka & the Chocolate Factory) by Anthony Newley & Leslie Bricusse / Anthem by Bjoern Ulvaeus & Benny Goran / Metropolitan Theme by Laurence Roger Fast / Pure Imagination (from Willy Wonka & the Chocolate Factory) by Anthony Newley & Leslie Bricusse	82.200	16th Place; World Class; Semifinalist	
2023	Sol Et Luna; Sun & Moon and Fate Written in The Stars by Ryan Erick Adamsons & Fred Emory Smith / And So It Goes by Billy Joel / Rocket to The Moon by Thomas Bergersen	82.500	18th Place; World Class; Semifinalist	
2024	When Opportunity Knocks; Can You Hear the Music? (from Oppenheimer) by Ludwig Goransson / Golden Hour by Jacob Lawson / Predator by John Psathas / Can You See Me? by Fred Emory Smith / Someone Like You (from Jekyll & Hyde) by Frank Wildhorn, Leslie Bricusse & Steve Cuden / You Can't Stop Me by Fred Emory Smith / Sailing Into Dawn (from The Lord of the Rings: The Rings of Power) by Bear McCreary	82.175	18th Place; World Class; Semifinalist	
2025	London Fog; Can't Fight City Halloween by Michael Giacchino & Natalie Holt / Enigma Variations by Edward Elgar / We Could Form an Attachment by Kris Bowers / Made of Water by Thomas Bergersen	83.313	17th Place; World Class; Semifinalist	
2026	In the Center of the Ring; The Greatest Show (from The Greatest Showman) by Benji Pasek & Justin Paul / Millionaire (from Slumdog Millionaire) by A. R. Rahman & Srimathumitha / Original music by Richard Saucedo / Never Enough (from The Greatest Showman) by Benji Pasek & Justin Paul / The Greatest Show on Earth & Ghost Love Score by Tuomas Holopainen & Marko Hietala (Nightwish)	82.525	17th Place; World Class; Semifinalist	
