= Crossmen Drum and Bugle Corps =

Junior drum and bugle corps based in San Antonio, Texas

Crossmen
- Location: San Antonio, Texas
- Division: World Class
- Founded: 1974
- Championship titles: 1977 American Legion 1981 VFW
- Website: crossmen.org

The Crossmen Drum and Bugle Corps is a competitive junior drum and bugle corps based in San Antonio, Texas. The Crossmen are a member of Drum Corps International (DCI) and compete in the World Class division.

== History ==
The Crossmen Drum and Bugle Corps was founded on October 1, 1974, through the merger of two suburban Philadelphia drum and bugle corps: the Keystone Regiment and the 507 Hornets. The name "Crossmen" was chosen, from a list of 43 proposed names, by the members of the new corps in recognition of American Legion Post 507, which was named in honor of World War I veteran John Wesley Cross. Beginning in Delaware County, Pennsylvania, the corps has, over the years, been based in several other communities. Their longest stays were in West Chester, Pennsylvania and Newark, Delaware.

The Crossmen were competitively successful from the start, winning the Eastern States Circuit Championship from 1975 to 1981. In 1977, the corps won the American Legion National Junior Drum and Bugle Corps Championship in Denver, Colorado. In 1981, they won the Veterans of Foreign Wars Nationals in Philadelphia.

In the winter of 1996, on the verge of folding, the corps became one of the programs sponsored by Youth Education in the Arts (YEA!), an organization which also included The Cadets Drum and Bugle Corps and the United States Scholastic Band Association. As a member of YEA!, the corps was based in Allentown, Pennsylvania. After the 2006 season, the corps relocated to San Antonio and then separated from YEA! in late August 2007.

The Crossmen have been Drum Corps International finalists a total of 29 times between 1977 and 2019.

== Show summary (1975–2026) ==
- Pale green background indicates DCI World Class Semifinalist. (Note: From 1975-1991, the Crossmen competed in Open Class, from 1992-2007 in Division I, and since 2008 in World Class. These are the same tier, just renamed.)
- Pale blue background indicates DCI World Class Finalist.

Year	Repertoire	World Championships	
Year	Repertoire	Score	Placement
1975	Overture to a New Era by Caesar Giovannini / Spanish Trip (Canarios) by John Williams / Gospel John by Jeffrey Steinberg / Journey to the Center of the Earth by Rick Wakeman	68.800	24th Place; Open Class
1976	Overture to a New Era by Caesar Giovannini / Spanish Trip (Canarios) by John Williams / Let's Hear It For Me (from Funny Lady) by John Kander & Fred Ebb / Journey to the Center of the Earth by Rick Wakeman / Tico Tico by Aloísio de Oliveira & Ervin Drake / Colour My World & Make Me Smile by James Pankow	Did not attend World Championships (Note: The Crossmen were disqualified in 1976 for having overage members.)	
1977	Marche Slav by Pyotr Ilyich Tchaikovsky / Let's Hear It For Me (from Funny Lady) by John Kander & Fred Ebb / Nadia's Theme & Bless the Beasts and Children by Barry De Vorzon & Perry Botkin Jr. / Russian Christmas Music by Alfred Reed	81.300	12th Place; Open Class; Finalist
1978	Jazz Rhapsody by Patrick Williams / Something by George Harrison / Great Day by Vincent Youmans, Edward Eliscu & Billy Rose / Let's Hear It For Me (from Funny Lady) by John Kander & Fred Ebb / Tico Tico by Aloísio de Oliveira & Ervin Drake / Russian Christmas Music by Alfred Reed	82.450	9th Place; Open Class; Finalist
1979	Slavonic Dance No. 1 by Antonín Dvořák / Meeting of the Spirits by John McLaughlin / Tiger of San Pedro by John LaBarbera / Planet Krypton, Main Theme & Can You Read My Mind (from Superman) by John Williams / Theme from Adventures of Superman by Leon Klatzkin	81.700	13th Place; Open Class
1980	Pictures de España by Larry Kerchner / Tiger of San Pedro by John LaBarbera / Spanish Fantasy by Chick Corea / Jack Miraculous by Gino Vannelli / Superman Medley by John Williams	81.900	8th Place; Open Class; Finalist
1981	Explosion by Matt Catingub / Something by George Harrison / Spanish Fantasy by Chick Corea / Bustling by Ian McDougall / Overture to Rocky II by Bill Conti	86.500	8th Place; Open Class; Finalist
1982	Artistry in Rhythm by Stan Kenton / Shoshana by Mark Levine / Canto del Viento by Anthony Yaklich / Russian Christmas Music by Alfred Reed	88.050	7th Place; Open Class; Finalist
1983	Overture to Ruslan and Lyudmila by Mikhail Glinka / Concerto del Rodrigo by Joaquín Rodrigo / Russian Christmas Music by Alfred Reed	78.600	13th Place; Open Class; Semifinalist
1984	Overture to Ruslan and Lyudmila by Mikhail Glinka / Shoshana by Cal Tjader / Canto del Viento by Anthony Yaklich / Let Me Try Again by Caravelli, Paul Anka & Sammy Cahn	86.300	10th Place; Open Class; Finalist
1985	Selections from Man of La Mancha by Mitch Leigh & Joe Darion / El Toro Loca / Ya Trata by Tania Maria / Casals Suite by Larry Kerchner	80.400	17th Place; Open Class Semifinalist
1986	Jazz Rhapsody by Patrick Williams / Not While I'm Around (from Sweeney Todd) by Stephen Sondheim / Street Dancing by Ed Blackwell / Sweeney Todd Suite by Stephen Sondheim	73.100	21st Place; Open Class; Semifinalist
1987	Summertime (from Porgy and Bess) by George Gershwin & DuBose Heyward / Dance by Matt Krempasky / Rumble by Chick Corea / Space Shuttle by John LaBarbera	81.600	16th Place; Open Class; Semifinalist
1988	Cherokee by Ray Noble / The Waltz by Rob McConnell / Summertime (from Porgy and Bess) by George Gershwin & DuBose Heyward	85.600	14th Place; Open Class; Semifinalist
1989	Wind Machine by Sammy Nestico / The Waltz by Rob McConnell / How High the Moon by Morgan Lewis & Nancy Hamilton	84.000	12th Place; Open Class; Finalist
1990	Baroque Samba by Darmon Meader / 'Round Midnight by Thelonious Monk / Caravan by Juan Tizol / Now or Never by Caprice Fox, Darmon Meader, Kim Nazarian, Peter DeRose, Peter Eldridge & Sara Krieger (New York Voices)	89.600	7th Place; Open Class; Finalist
1991	Pat Metheny Suite; Minuano (Six Eight) by Pat Metheny & Lyle Mays / Dream of the Return by Pat Metheny & Pedro Aznar / Third Wind by Pat Metheny & Lyle Mays	89.700	8th Place; Open Class; Finalist
1992	Songs for the Planet Earth; Begin Sweet World by Bill Douglas / Appalachian Morning by Paul Halley / The Four Elements by Matt Krempasky & Mark Thurston / The Rain Forest by Karl Lundeberg / Under the Sun by John Clark, Paul Halley, Paul McCandless, Glen Velez & Paul Winter	92.200	6th Place; Division I Finalist
1993	Songs for the Planet Earth, Part II: A Celebration of Humanity; Fanfare for the Common Man by Aaron Copland / Myth America by Karl Lundeberg / Koto Song by Dave Brubeck / River Music by Eugene Friesen / Freda by Kenny Baker / Anthem for Humanity by Paul Halley	89.600	8th Place; Division I Finalist
1994	Songs for the Planet Earth, Part III: Suite Children; Land of Make Believe by Chuck Mangione / Children Will Listen (from Into the Woods) by Stephen Sondheim / Pop Goes the Weasel (Traditional) / Songs for the Planet Earth - Finale by Michael Klesch	88.400	7th Place; Division I Finalist
1995	Overture (from The School for Scandal) by Samuel Barber / Symphony for Brass and Percussion (Mvts. 2 & 3) by Alfred Reed	85.100	10th Place; Division I Finalist
1996	The Voices of Jazz; The Sultan Fainted by Darmon Meader & Peter Eldridge (New York Voices) / A Nightingale Sang in Berkeley Square by Manning Sherwin & Eric Maschwitz / Birdland by Josef Zawinul	85.500	8th Place; Division I Finalist
1997	The Colors of Jazz; Birdland by Josef Zawinul / You are My Sunshine by Jimmie Davis & Charles Mitchell / Niner Two by Don Ellis	93.000	6th Place; Division I Finalist
1998	The Music of Pat Metheny; Third Wind by Pat Metheny & Lyle Mays / Letter From Home by Pat Metheny / The First Circle by Pat Metheny & Lyle Mays	91.400	7th Place; Division I Finalist
1999	Changing Perspectives: A Silver Celebration; Blue Shades by Frank Ticheli / When October Goes by Barry Manilow & Johnny Mercer / Appalachian Morning by Paul Halley	87.000	10th Place; Division I Finalist
2000	Clubbin' with the Crossmen; In the Mood by Joe Garland, Andy Razaf & Wingy Manone / Caravan by Juan Tizol / Nobody Does Me by Rod Temperton / Birdland by Josef Zawinul	88.550	9th Place; Division I Finalist
2001	Late Night Jazz; Harlem Nocturne by Earle Hagen & Dick Rogers / Flying Home by Lionel Hampton, Benny Goodman & Eddie DeLange / Guaguanco by Arturo Sandoval / Fire Dance by Allen Vizzutti	91.150	7th Place; Division I Finalist
2002	The Signature Series; The Heat of the Day by Pat Metheny & Lyle Mays / Candle in the Window (from Civil War: Our Story in Song) by Frank Wildhorn / Strawberry Soup by Don Ellis	89.100	9th Place; Division I Finalist
2003	Colors; Over the Rainbow (from The Wizard of Oz) by E.Y. Harburg & Harold Arlen / Welcome to the St. James Club by Russ Freeman / Blue Rondo à la Turk by Dave Brubeck / Count Bubba by Gordon Goodwin	86.900	9th Place; Division I Finalist
2004	Unity: Out of Many, One; Jubal Step by Wynton Marsalis / Both Sides, Now by Joni Mitchell / Puma by Karl Lundeberg	87.425	11th Place; Division I Finalist
2005	Crossroads; Classical Gas by Mason Williams / Radar Love by George Kooymans & Barry Hay / So Far Away by Carole King / Paradise by the Dashboard Light by Jim Steinman	84.050	14th Place; Division I Semifinalist
2006	Changing Lanes; Prelude to a Drive & Cruisin' by Pat Metheny & Lyle Mays / Caribe (from One More Once) by Michel Camilo / If I Had My Way by Frank Wildhorn & Jack Murphy / Shortcut Home by Keith Emerson & Greg Lake	81.250	15th Place; Division I Semifinalist
2007	Metamorphosis; Russian Christmas Music by Alfred Reed / The First Circle by Pat Metheny & Lyle Mays / Birdland by Josef Zawinul / Symphonic Metamorphosis & Symphony in B-Flat by Paul Hindemith / The Crow by DJ Food / P5 by Aaron Guidry	81.600	16th Place; Division I Semifinalist
2008	Planet X Jupiter, Mars & Mercury (from The Planets) by Gustav Holst / What a Wonderful World by Bob Thiele & George David Weiss	85.950	13th Place; World Class; Semifinalist
2009	ForbiddeN; Dance of Vengeance (from Medea) by Samuel Barber / My Immortal by Amy Lee, Ben Moody & David Hodges (Evanescence) / ForbiddeN by Aaron Guidry	81.650	16th Place; World Class; Semifinalist
2010	Full Circle; First Circle & Heat of the Day by Pat Metheny & Lyle Mays / Letter From Home by Pat Metheny / Minuano (Six Eight) by Pat Metheny & Lyle Mays / Full Circle by Aaron Guidry	80.900	17th Place; World Class; Semifinalist
2011	Renewal; Episode: Prelude by Nando Lauria / Ursa Major by Chuck Naffier / Spinning Wheel by David Clayton-Thomas / Hallelujah by Leonard Cohen / Back Home by Nando Lauria	81.050	17th Place; World Class; Semifinalist
2012	FRAGILE; Earth Song by Michael Jackson / Wailers by Bobby McFerrin / PD7 by Anoushka Shankar / Here Comes the Flood by Peter Gabriel / Finding and Believing by Pat Metheny	84.000	12th Place; World Class; Finalist
2013	Protest; The Prophet's Song by Brian May / She's Too Good For Me by Gordon Matthew Thomas Sumner (Sting) / "The Sound of Silence" by Paul Simon / They Don't Care About Us by Michael Jackson / Some Nights by Jeff Bhasker, Nate Ruess, Andrew Dost & Jack Antonoff (fun.) / We Shall Overcome by Pete Seeger / Goodbye Blue Sky by Pink Floyd / Find the Cost of Freedom by Stephen Stills	84.850	14th Place; World Class; Semifinalist
2014	Alma Gitana – A Gypsy Soul; Bulgaria by Peter Erskine / Erghen Diado by Peter Lionder / Emmanuel by Michel Colombier / Zambra by Macaco MonoLoco, Marina Abad & Marina laCanillas (Ojos de Brujo) / Habanera (from Carmen) by Georges Bizet / Caravan by Juan Tizol	86.225	12th Place; World Class; Finalist
2015	Above & Beyond; Fly to Paradise by Eric Whitacre / Ascent by Andrew Markworth / Jubal Step by Wynton Marsalis / One Day I'll Fly Away (from Moulin Rouge!) by Will Jennings & Joe Sample / Butterfly by Mia Makaroff	85.025	12th Place; World Class; Finalist
2016	Continuum; Original Music by Andrew Markworth	86.975	10th Place; World Class; Finalist
2017	Enigma; The Question by Andrew Markworth / Kaleidoscope of Mathematics (from A Beautiful Mind) by James Horner / The Maze by Andrew Markworth / Exit Music by Thom Yorke, Jonny Greenwood, Ed O'Brien, Colin Greenwood & Phil Selway (Radiohead) / The Lightbulb by Andrew Markworth / Piano Concerto No. 1 by Keith Emerson	86.825	11th Place; World Class; Finalist
2018	The In-Between; Funeral for a Friend by Elton John / Upside Down by Andrew Markworth / Symphony No. 6 by Pyotr Ilyich Tchaikovsky / Sweetness Follows by Michael Stipe, Peter Buck, Mike Mills & Bill Berry (R.E.M.)	86.750	12th Place; World Class; Finalist
2019	Valkyrie; Immigrant Song by Jimmy Page & Robert Plant (Led Zeppelin) / The Wolf by Andrew Markworth / Hurt by Trent Reznor (Nine Inch Nails) / Ride Into Battle by Andrew Markworth	87.550	11th Place; World Class; Finalist
2020	Season canceled due to the COVID-19 pandemic		
2021	Your Move; Minuano (Six Eight) by Pat Metheny / Movement by Andrew Hozier-Byrne / Coronation by Ilan Eshkeri	No scored competitions	
2022	A Möbius Trip; Symphony No. 2, Mvt. 4 by Gustav Mahler / Equus by Eric Whitacre / Addis Abba by Guillermo Lago / Alfonso Muskedunder by Todd Terje / Re-Entry (from In the Shadow of the Moon) by Philip Sheppard	86.925	13th Place; World Class; Semifinalist
2023	Meetings at the Edge; The Long and Winding Road by The Beatles / Meetings Along the Edge by Philip Glass & Ravi Shankar / Letter From Home by Pat Metheny / The Windup by Keith Jarrett / The Yellow Jacket by Shaun Martin	86.138	13th Place; World Class; Semifinalist
2024	Lush Life; Lush Life by Billy Strayhorn / My Favorite Things by Rodgers and Hammerstein / So What by Miles Davis / 'Round Midnight by Thelonious Monk / Night in Tunisia by Dizzy Gillespie / Blues in the Night by Harold Arlen & Johnny Mercer / La Création Du Monde by Darius Milhaud / Original Music by Drew Shanefield, Ray Ulibarri & Juan Arreguin	84.875	15th Place; World Class; Semifinalist
2025	CROSSWALKing; Walk on By by Burt Bacharach / The Beginning by Louis Futon / Haitian Fight Song by Charles Mingus / Hoe Down by Oliver Nelson / Unsquare Dance by Dave Brubeck / Symphony No. 2 by Sergei Rachmaninoff / New Birth by The Funky Knuckles	82.225	19th Place; World Class; Semifinalist
2026	A Side / B Side; Earth Song by Michael Jackson / Last Train Home by Pat Metheny / Mr. Pinstripe Suit by Scotty Morris (Performed by Big Bad Voodoo Daddy) / Classical Gas by Mason Williams / i'm confident that i'm insecure by Gracie Lawrence, Clyde Lawrence, Jon Bellion, & Jonny Koh / Abstract Thought by Michael Giacchino / Record Player by Kelly Dugan, Mina Walker, Ryan Met, Jack Met, and Adam Met (Performed by Daisy the Great and AJR) / Original Music from John Meehan and Mike Huestis	83.425	15th Place; World Class; Semifinalist
