= Northern Lights Drum and Bugle Corps =

Northern Lights
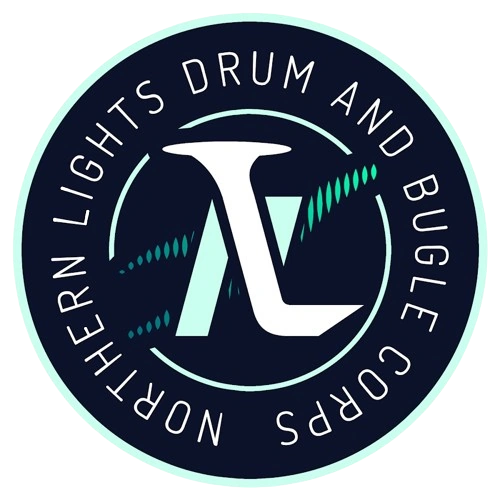
- Location: Muskegon, Michigan
- Division: DCI All-Age Open
- Founded: 2022
- Director: Misty Olmstead
- Website: www.northernlightsmi.org

Northern Lights Drum and Bugle Corps is a 501(c)(3) nonprofit music education organization all-age drum and bugle corps based in Muskegon, Michigan. Founded in 2022, it competes within Drum Corps International's (DCI) SoundSport program and, as of 2025, has begun competing in DCI’s All-Age Class.

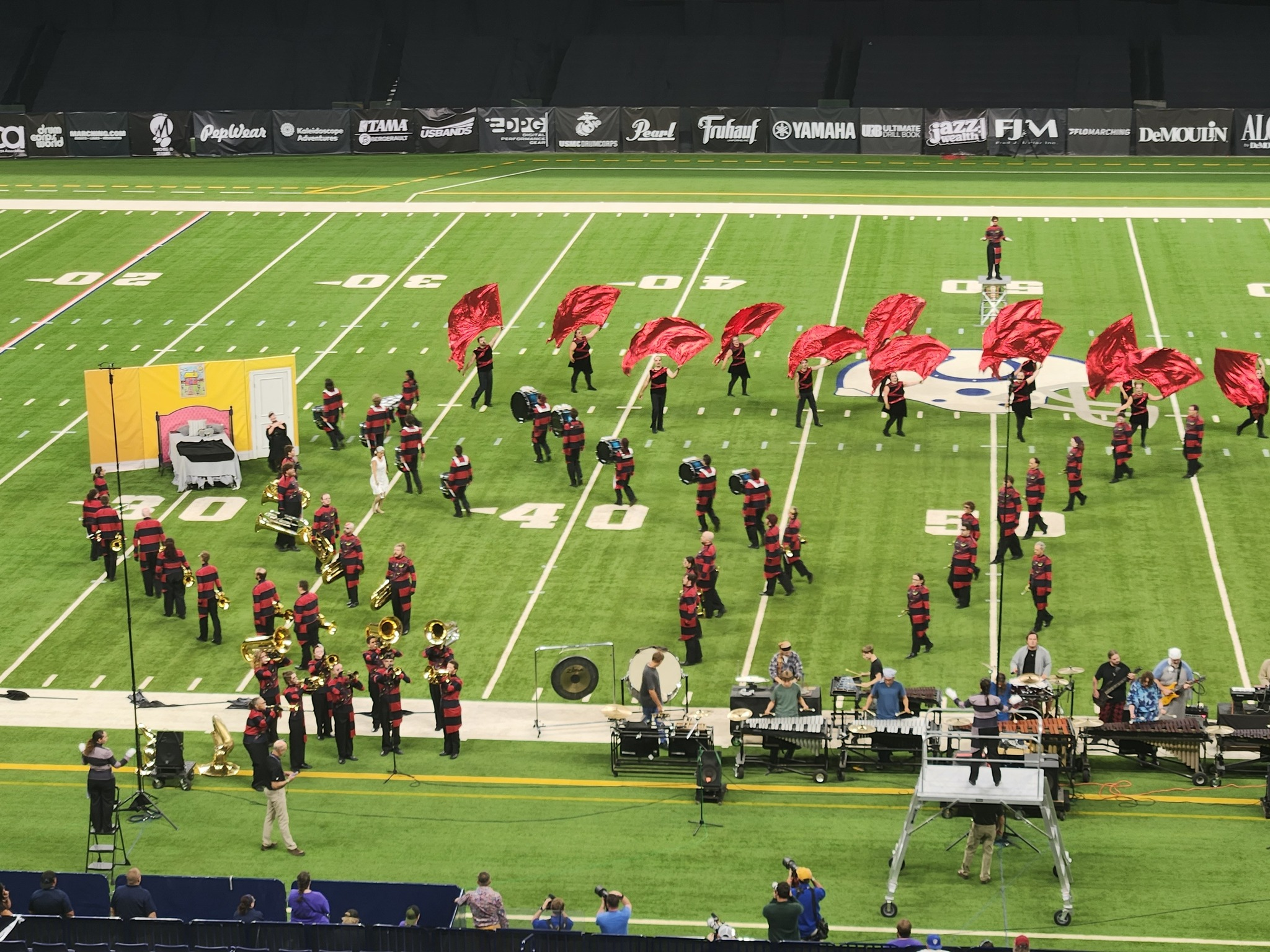
A photo from the 2025 Northern Lights production entitled "Sweet Dreams"

== History ==
Northern Lights was founded in 2022 by Misty Olmstead, Doug Olmstead, AJ Olmstead, Jordan Roberts and a team of other music educators and designers. In 2023, the corps launched and began performing exhibitions, it officially joined DCI's SoundSport competitive circuit in 2023.

Rehearsal started in November of 2023 hosted by Muskegon Community College in the Fine Arts Center.

== Operation ==
The corps operates on a volunteer basis with no paid staff members. Expenses are supported through member dues, fundraising, and donations. In 2024, dues were approximately $350. The corps’ 2024 operating team included around 130 people between staff, volunteers, and members.

As of 2024, Northern Lights entered a partnership with Newaygo Public Schools (NPS) in Newaygo, Michigan. This partnership allows Northern Lights to use NPS's indoor and outdoor sports facilities as well as Newaygo Marching Band equipment.

The age range of members spans from 12 years old to over 60, with numerous parent/child pairs marching together. Northern Lights fielded approximately 42 members in 2023 and grew to 97 performers in 2024, more than doubling in size and adding a color guard for the first time.

In 2024, Northern Lights was featured by WGVU PBS in Living West Michigan. On July 8, 2025, NPR affiliate WGVU’s Shelley Irwin Show profiled Northern Lights.

== Traditions ==
=== Home Show ===
Like many other drum corps, Northern Lights hosts a home show annually in Lubbers Stadium at Grand Valley State University.

=== Corps Song ===
The Northern Lights corps song is “Michigan and Again” by The Accidentals.

Year	Title	Repertoire	World Championships Score	World Championships Placement
2023	"Cathedral"	"Salve Regina Gregorian Chant" - "Engulfed Cathedral" by Claude Debussy - 1812 Overture by Tchaikovsky - "Elsa's Procession to the Cathedral" by Richard Wagner	SoundSport "Gold"	3rd Place Soundsport
2024	"Ignis"	“Dance of the Spirits of Fire” and “Mars” by Gustav Holst - “Firebird” by Stravinsky - "Symphony No. 2" by Gustav Mahler	SoundSport "Gold"	3rd Place Soundsport
2025	"~~Sweet~~ Dreams"	"Sweet Dreams (Are Made of This)" by Eurythmics - "Danse Macabre" by Saint-Saëns - "Sleep" by Eric Whitacre - “Dream is Collapsing” and “Mombasa” by Hans Zimmer - “Symphonie Fantastique" by Hector Berlioz - “Lux Aeterna" by Clint Marsell	SoundSport "Gold" DCI All Age Championships: 76.425	SoundSport DCI All Age Championships:13th Place
2026	"Someday I Might"	"Blood and Stone" by Audiomachine - "What Was I Made For" by Billie Eilish - "Algorithm" by Muse - “Symphony No. 3" by Saint-Saëns	DCI All Age Championships: 80.550	DCI All Age Championships:11th Place

== See also ==
- Drum Corps International
- SoundSport
- List of drum and bugle corps
