= Govenaires Drum and Bugle Corps =

All-age drum and bugle corps based in St. Peter, Minnesota

Govenaires
- Location: St. Peter, Minnesota
- Division: All-Age
- Founded: 1927
- President: Nik Proehl
- Championship titles: DCA Class A: 2006; 2009; 2011; 2015; DCI All-Age Class A: 2024; 2025
- Website: govenaires.org

The Govenaires Drum and Bugle Corps (also known as The Govies) is an all-age drum and bugle corps based in St. Peter, Minnesota, that competes in the Drum Corps International (DCI) All-Age class. Founded in 1927, the Govenaires are considered to be the oldest continuously active drum and bugle corps. In 2024, the corps won the inaugural DCI All-Age Class A Championship in Indianapolis. Prior to the dissolution of Drum Corps Associates (DCA), The Govenaires won four DCA Class A World Champions. The Govenaires Drum and Bugle Corps is part of the Govenaires Performing Arts Association (GPAA). GPAA was founded in 2017 to help organize and support multiple ensembles, most recently including the Govenaires Parade and Concert Corps (GPC) and an indoor percussion ensemble.

== History ==
In 1927, local meat market owner Ruben Siebert founded the St. Peter Legion Corps. The corps was composed mainly of World War I veterans who were members of the William R. Witty American Legion Post 37 in St. Peter. Highlights of the early years of the corps included many parades, festivals, and state competitions. Karl Klein, a member of the St. Peter Legion Corps, recalled a trip to Winnipeg, Manitoba, as well.

Although there were hard times sustaining the corps during the Great Depression and throughout the 1930s and early 1940s, the corps continued to perform. In 1944, Cliff Hermel took over the reins of the drum corps and changed its name to the St. Peter Drum and Bugle Corps. This name change was in response to a growing Veterans of Foreign Wars (VFW) drum corps circuit in Minnesota in which the St. Peter corps joined and eventually dominated in the 1950s and early 1960s with 10 state championships. Hermel continued leading the corps into the 1970s also creating two other corps in St. Peter, the Black Knights for children 8–13 years old and the Crusaders for members of the ages 14–20 years old. These corps did not exist long, but the tenacity and highly motivated leadership of Cliff Hermel is evident through their formation.

During the 1950s, drum corps around the country began adopting names that did not reflect their sponsorships, similar to what sports teams do. In 1961, the St. Peter Drum and Bugle elected to change their name to the Vikings Drum and Bugle Corps. This name did not last long because the newly formed professional football team in Minnesota selected the same name and the members of the St. Peter corps did not want to give the impression of affiliation with the new football club. Thus, the drum corps was once again renamed this time they chose the name Govenaires to honor the five governors of Minnesota who hailed from St, Peter. To this day, the spelling of Govenaires is a mystery. Most would assume that the name should be spelled as Governaires and it is consistently misspelled this way, but nevertheless the name was changed to the Govenaires and has remained such to this day.

The Govenaires, under the direction of Hermel, saw an incredible amount of success on the competition field. Besides winning ten VFW State Championships and an American Legion State Championship, the corps ventured to its first national championship in 1964 in Dallas, Texas, where they took fourth place. During this period, Billy Stangler and Pat Mayer began their reigns in various corps leadership roles. The 1960s also introduced the first women into the Govenaires ranks. Margaret Mayer, Pat's wife, became the first female member and eventually became a key player in keeping the corps running through the 1970s and 1980s.

The 1970s were marked by two trips to the American Legion National Championships. The first, in 1976, was a long haul to Seattle, Washington. Unfortunately for the Govenaires, they were the only corps in their class that attended the championships that year and therefore no competition was held. Although the Govenaires were not crowned champions, the trip was viewed as highly successful and even though they experienced a bus breakdown in Butte, Montana that caused the already lengthy trip home longer, the corps decided to make the journey to the next season's American Legion National Championship in Denver. This year, the Govenaires did have competition at the championships and were runners-up in their class.

The next decade, the 1980s, were marked by the corps' introduction to the Midwest circuit, Drum Corps Midwest (DCM). The Govenaires began competing in the DCM championships in 1982 and still competed there until the circuit folded in 2005. Another trip to the American Legion National Championships in 1985 in New Orleans was yet another highlight of the corps. During this decade, the corps was led by many different directors of operations, but the constant presence of Pat and Margaret Mayer in leadership roles is evident. The Mayers also became the owners of a local pub in St. Peter, Patrick's, which became and still is the home base for Govenaires. The pub celebrates the history of the Govenaires with corps memorabilia and has become an integral location to the Govenaires and its membership.

After some extremely thin years in the late 1980s, Pat and Margaret's son, John, took over as director in 1990. John took over a drum corps in crisis. The reputation of the Govenaires had been suffering in the community and the membership base was at an all-time low. Nevertheless, the Govenaires competed with 17 members at the DCM Midwest Championships and were able to make an impression on the audiences. Although the judge's scores were low, the corps exhibited an ability to entertain the audiences by playing their final song "Show Me the Way to Go Home" on the track in front of the competition field while throwing candy into the crowd. This stress on entertainment over competition still exists in the corps today and ended up being a pivotal decision made by Mayer at the time.

The next 15 years showed growth in the talent pool entering the corps. By 1995, the corps contained 57 members and was beginning to consistently beat corps of greater size. The late 1990s also marked the time when the Govenaires built up a convoy of three buses and an equipment truck to make transportation easier for everybody in the corps. Each vehicle was painted Kelly green with a racing stripe of black with a white border. This pattern became an identifying feature of the corps which is now portrayed on all of the Govenaires souvenirs, the corps website, and the now-famous "Govie buttons" that are displayed on the corps' uniforms and distributed to fans of the corps.

In 2004, the decision to take the Govenaires to the Drum Corps Associates (DCA) World Championships was made. Featuring an international field of drum corps, DCA had become an important circuit within the drum and bugle corps community. The corps decided to make its first ever trip out east to Scranton, Pennsylvania to compete. Having a membership base of only 38 performers, the Govenaires placed second in the Class A division and sparked a national following that was previously nonexistent. People marveled at how well the corps performed for its size, but to the members of the Govenaires it was business as usual.

The next season marked another Class A second place followed by the Class A championship in 2006 at Rochester. The 2007 version of the Govenaires marked yet another second place in DCA's Class A .

The corps fell to 6th place at DCA in 2008 but returned to the top in 2009, winning their second Class A championship. A fourth-place finish in 2010 was followed by DCA championship number 3 in 2011. Three successive second-place finishes in 2012–2014 led to the Govenaires' fourth DCA Class A title in 2015.

In 2016, the organization completed two major milestones: competing in DCA Open Class competition (performing in DCA Finals competition and finishing in 10th place overall), and embarking on an international trip to perform in the Shanghai Tourism Festival. The following year led to the formation of GPAA and the creation of GPC, a separate ensemble that caters to parade and concert performances. In 2019 and 2022, GPC embarked on two separate trips to Austria to perform alongside Musikkapelle Obermarkersdorf, a community ensemble from Lower Austria that also performed in the 2016 Shanghai Tourism Festival.

In the inaugural season of DCI's All-Age Class, the Govenaires took top honors in Class A, winning the 2024 Championship and capturing all caption awards (High Brass, Sean Holton Award for High Percussion, High Visual, High Total Effect, and High Color Guard).

== Show summary (1992–2026) ==
dSource:

Class A participant
Class A finalist
Open Class finalist
World Champion
- 1992-2003: Drum Corps Midwest (DCM)
- 2004-2023: Drum Corps Associates (DCA)
- 2024-present: Drum Corps International (DCI)

Year	Theme	Repertoire	Score	Placement
1992		Blue Birdland by James P. Giuffre / Scream Machine by James Morrison / Harlem Nocturne by Earle Hagen and Dick Rogers / Sing Sing Sing by Louis Prima	44.000	
1993		Blue Birdland by James P. Giuffre / Love for Sale by Cole Porter / Harlem Nocturne by Earle Hagen and Dick Rogers / Since I Fell for You by Buddy Johnson	46.600	
1994		Big Spender (from Sweet Charity) by Cy Coleman and Dorothy Fields / Love for Sale Cole Porter / Brother Can You Spare a Dime by Author Unknown / Street Corner Ambassador by Author Unknown / Since I Fell for You by Buddy Johnson	43.100	
1995		Fever by John Davenport and Eddie Cooley / Groovin' Hard by Don Menza / Palookaville by Author Unknown / Stolen Moments by Oliver Nelson / Just a Gigolo/I Ain't Got Nobody by Julius Brammer, Irving Caesar, Leonello Casucci, Roger Graham, and Spencer Williams	54.700	
1996		Birdland by Josef Zawinul / Groovin' Hard by Don Menza / A Night in Tunisia by Dizzy Gillespie and Frank Paparelli / Moondance by Van Morrison	52.000	
1997		Pressure Cooker by Author Unknown / 'Round Midnight by Thelonious Monk / Samba de Los Gatos by Author Unknown / Penguin Shuffle by Lorie Line	51.200	
1998	Music That's Fun to Play	Blue Birdland by James P. Giuffre / Theme from Shaft by Issac Hayes / A Night ion Tunisia by Dizzy Gillespie and Frank Paparelli	58.000	
1999	American Dance	Fever by John Davenport and Eddie Cooley / Penguin Shuffle by Lorie Line / Love for Sale by Cole Porter / Jelly Donut by Jeff Nelson & Jason Hoffman	50.000	
2000		Jelly Donut by Jeff Nelson & Jason Hoffman / Blue Birdland by James P. Giuffre	53.250	
2001		Celebration Suite by Chick Corea / La Fiesta by Chick Corea / Malaguena by Ernesto Lecuona	53.700	
2002	Songs from the Wild Party	Blue Birdland by James P. Giuffre / Brass Machine by Werner Drexler / Song from the Wild Party by Author Unknown	57.900	
2003	A Celebration of Life	Georgia on my Mind (from Taxi) by Hoagy Carmichael / Tank (from Cowboy Bebop) / Rush (from Cowboy Bebop) (both by Yoko Kanno) / Hey Pachuko by Author Unknown	49.700	
2004	Livin's Easy	Summertime (from Porgy and Bess) by George Gershwin and DuBose Heyward / A Night in Tunisia by Dizzy Gillespie and Frank Paparelli / In the Stone by Allee Willis, David Foster, and Maurice White	75.163	2nd
2005	A Night in Town	"When a Man Loves a Woman" by Calvin Lewis and Andrew Wright / Groovin' Hard by Don Menza / Land of Make Believe by Chuck Mangione / Penguin Shuffle by Lorie Line	78.088	2nd
2006	Get on the Bus	Magical Mystery Tour by Lennon/McCartney / Birdland / Big Noise from Winnetka (from Reveille with Beverly) by Bob Haggart and Ray Bauduc / Lust by Jeff Nelson & Jason Hoffman	78.625	1st Class A
2007	We've Only Just Begun	Julius by Phish / Love for Sale by Cole Porter / Harlem Nocturne by Earle Hagen and Dick Rogers / Sing, Sang, Sung by Gordon Goodwin	83.188	2nd
2008	Bus Fumes and Dreams	House of the Rising Sun by Eric Burdon / Nutville by Horace Silver / Selections (from The Wild Party) by Author Unknown	77.413	6th
2009	Summer of Seduction	Crazy Little Thing Called Love by Queen / Lust by Jeff Nelson & Jason Hoffman / Hot for Teacher by Van Halen	82.400	1st Class A
2010	Road Trip	On the Road Again by Willie Nelson / Motown Medley by Author Unknown / A Night in Tunisia by Dizzy Gillespie and Frank Paparelli / Tiger Rad by Eddie Edwards, Nick LaRocca, Tony Sbarbaro, Henry Ragas, and Larry Shields / When the Saints Go Marching In by Virgil O. Stamps	81.013	4th
2011	What Happens In Vegas	Luck be a Lady (from Guys and Dolls) by Frank Loesser / Money by Pink Floyd / Money, Money, Money by Benny Andersson and Bjourn Ulvaeus / Big Spender (from Sweet Charity) by Cy Coleman and Dorothy Fields / Can't Help Falling in Love by Hugo Peretti, Luigi Creatore, and George David Weiss / Wedding March by Felix Mendelssohn / Viva Las Vegas by Ronald L. Miller	84.930	1st Class A
2012	Hot	Fever by John Davenport and Eddie Cooley / Too Darn Hot by Cole Porter / Ring of Fire by June Carter Cash, and Merle Kilgore / Fire by John Meehan / Light My Fire by Jim Morrison, Robby Krieger, Ray Manzarek, and John Densmore / Hot Stuff by Author Unknown / Hot Lunch Jam by Robert Colesberry / Hot Stuff by Pete Bellotte / Harold Faltermeyer Keith Foresy / Disco Inferno by Leroy Green and Ron Kersey	80.930	2nd
2013	Chasing Hollywood	Prologue and Them (from City of Angels) by Cy Coleman and David Zippel / Sparkling Diamonds (from Moulin Rouge) by David Francis Baerwald / Sunset Boulevard by Andrew Lloyd Webster / Send in the Clowns (from A Little Night Music) by Stephen Sondheim / Don't Rain on my Parade (from Funny Girl) by Jule Styne and Bob Merrill	84.780	2nd
2014	Pasión	Man of La Mancha by Mitch Leigh and Joe Darion / Lust by Jeff Nelson & Jason Hoffman / The Rainmaker by Earl Klugh / Ojos A Si by Author Unknown / Malaguena by Ernesto Lecuona	83.980	2nd
2015	Outlaw	Battle Without Honor or Humanity by Tomoyasu / The Magnificent Seven by Elemer Bernstein / Ecstasy of Gold by Ennio Morricone / Enemy Guns by DeVotchka / Kashmir by Jimmy Page, Robert Plant, and John Bonham	82.450	1st Class A
2016	Sherlock	Discombobulate / I Never Woke Up In Handcuffs Before (both from Sherlock Holmes by Hans Zimmer) / Chandelier by Sia / Excerpts by Bernard Hermann	84.450	10th
2017	Uncharted: A Lost Relic	The Hunt for Red October / Requiem for a Dream / Hide and Seek by Imogen Heap / Enterprising Young Men by Michael Giachinno	81.430	2nd
2018	A Wo/Man's World	Proud Mary by Tina Turner / Kaval Sviri / "It's a Man's Man's Man's World" by James Brown / Run the World (Girls) by Beyonce Knowles / Ain't No Mountain High Enough by Marvin Gaye and Tammi Terrell / Respect by Aretha Franklin	80.650	2nd
2019	The Govies Take Manhattan	A Tone Parallel to Harlem by gton / Hundred Story City (from 'Ordinary Days') by Adam Gwon / Sir Duke by Stevie Wonder / Empire State of Mind by Jay-Z and Alicia Keys	77.125	3rd
2020	Season cancelled due to the COVID-19 pandemic			
2021	Where the Sidewalk Ends	Finlandia by Jean Sibelius / The Children's Hour of Dream by Charles Mingus / Pure Imagination (from Willy Wonka and the Chocolate Factory) by Leslie Bricusse and Anthony Newley / Land of Make Believe by Chuck Mangione	76.600	2nd
2022	Back on the Bus	On the Road Again by Willie Nelson / Julius by Trey Anastasio & Tom Marshall / Spanish Flea by Herb Alpert / All I Need Is a Miracle by Mike Rutherford & Christopher Neil / Windy by Ruthann Friedman / Magic Bus by Pete Townshend	78.975	3rd
2023	Paparazzi	Paparazzi by Lady Gaga / Granada by Juan Garcia Esquivel	77.325	3rd
2024	Woodstock: This Is The Dawning	Judy Blue Eyes by Stephen Stills / Piece of My Heart by Bert Berns & Jerry Ragovoy / Aquarius/Let the Sunshine In by Galt MacDermot, Gerome Ragni & James Rado / Original music by Ward Miller, Lee Krueger & Hayden Holum	80.775	1st Class A
2025	Among Thieves	La Gazza Ladra by Gioachino Rossini / Is It a Crime by Sade / Bad Dog No Biscuits by Seatbelts / Original music by Ward Miller, Lee Krueger & Hayden Holum	80.775	1st Class A
2026	Ride On	Every Day Is Exactly The Same by Nine Inch Nails / Caravan by Juan Tizol & Duke Ellington / You Know I'm No Good by Amy Winehouse / Free Bird by Lynyrd Skynyrd / Original music by Ward Miller, Lee Krueger & Hayden Holum	82.175	10th
