= Atlanta CV Drum and Bugle Corps =

Atlanta CV
- Location: Atlanta, Georgia
- Division: DCI All-Age Class
- Director: Russ Thompson
- Championship titles: DCA Class A: 2001
- Website: atlantacv.org

Atlanta CV (formerly known as The Atlanta CorpsVets) is an all-age drum and bugle corps that competes as an All-Age member of Drum Corps International. It was founded in 1997 and is one of two competitive corps in the state of Georgia, alongside Spirit of Atlanta.

== History ==
=== Founding ===
The Atlanta CorpsVets was started by Robin and Tracey Wofford and Tom and Janet Walsh in conjunction with American Legion Post #1 in the summer of 1997.

The first rehearsal of the corps was in January 1998. That summer, the corps boasted a membership of 44 performers and performed exhibitions at a local Drum Corps International competition as well as marched in the WSB-TV Salute 2 America Parade in downtown Atlanta. The final performance the inaugural season was at the Drum Corps Associates Championship in Allentown, Pennsylvania where several members represented the corps in the Individual and Ensemble Competition.

=== Growth and Results ===
In 1999 the corps grew to 55 members and traveled to the DCA Championships, placing 4th in the mini-corps competition. Growth continued in 2000, with the corps featuring 56 members and placing second at the DCA Championships in the Class A division. In 2001 the CorpsVets grew to 65 members and won the Class A title at the DCA championships with a record score in that division.

The following year, 2002, the corps grew to 94 members, advanced to the highly competitive Open Class Division of DCA and tied for 11th place at the championships. Since 2002 the corps has competed in Open Class attaining finalist status each season fielding corps of over 100 members.

In 2012 the corps shortened its name to Atlanta CV Drum and Bugle Corps, adopting the "CV" moniker already often used to refer to the "CorpsVets". This rebranding helped eliminate the misconception that a member must be a vet of a corps in order to participate, which was never the case.

The corps' highest placement coincides with their highest score, set at the 2017 DCA Championships finals, with a score of 96.63 and 2nd place overall. They are the 10 Time DCA South Champions and the highest placing and highest scoring southern corps in DCA History.

=== DCI All-Age ===
The final DCA championship was hosted in 2023. In 2024, Atlanta CV and other DCA Corps were absorbed into DCI, under the new All-Age class. At the Inaugural DCI All-Age championship, Atlanta CV placed 4th overall.

== Show summary (1998–2026) ==
Key
Goldenrod background indicates DCA Class A Champion
Turquoise background indicates DCA Class A Finalist
Blue background indicates DCA Open Class Finalist

Year	Repertoire	Score	Placement
1998	Inaugural Season; Danny Boy, Armed Forces Medley, Atlanta Constitution March, Conto Del Viento		
1999	North American Suite; Mr. Pinstripe Suit, Ashokan Farewell, Conto Del Viento		
2000	Hunterman; Hunter Green Blues, Caravan, In the Stone, One More Time Chuck Corea	71.0	2nd Place; Class A Finalist
2001	Jones' Best; She's No Lady She's My Wife, Boogie Down, Taste of Honey, One More Time Chuck Corea	83.75	1st Place; Class A Champion
2002	Jazz After Dark; Night and Day, Round Midnight, Blues in the Night, Tank/reprise Blues, Georgia	84.55	11th Place; Open Class; Finalist
2003	Wild Party; Georgia, Rush, What is it About Her?, Juggernaut, Jackie's Last Dance, Reprise Juggernaut	86.275	8th Place; Open Class; Finalist
2004	Heart of Jazz; When a Man Loves a Woman, Johnny One Note, Big Noise from Winnetka, When a Man Loves a Woman, Johnny, Big Noise	83.075	10th Place; Open Class; Finalist
2005	MODE: Music of Don Ellis; Open Wide by Don Ellis / Strawberry Soup by Don Ellis	85.5	9th Place; Open Class; Finalist
2006	A Trip to Vegas; Luck Be a Lady, Feeling Good, Copacabanna, Everybody Loves Somebody, A Little Less Conversation, Diamonds are a Girls Best Friend, I Can't Help Falling in Love, Viva Las Vegas	85.75	9th Place; Open Class; Finalist
2007	Celebration; Georgia on My Mind, Bacchanalia, LaFiesta, Remembrance	88.775	9th Place; Open Class; Finalist
2008	Simple Gifts; Down in the River to Pray, Appalachian Morning, Inferno, Simple Gifts, Oh Shenandoah	86.763	9th Place; Open Class; Finalist
2009	Southern Suite; Tara's Theme (from Gone With the Wind), I Got Plenty O' Nuttin' (from Porgy and Bess), The First Letter (from The Color Purple), Miss Otis Regrets (She's Unable To Lunch Today), Maybe God Is Tryin' to Tell You Somethin' (from The Color Purple)	83.75	10th Place; Open Class; Finalist
2010	360; We Go On from Millennium Celebration at Epcot, Celebration from Reflections of Earth, The Sage of Time Prologue from Tapestry of Nations, Chaos from Reflections of Earth, Home from Reflections of Earth	87.7	8th Place; Open Class; Finalist
2011	Dusk To Dawn; Shostakovich 10, Providence Unfinished, Ammerland, Ballet Sacra	85.0	8th Place; Open Class; Finalist
2012	God Save the Queen; Festive Overture, Crown Imperial, Bohemian Rhapsody, Who Wants to Live Forever, Nimrod, Fat Bottomed Girls, Bicycle Race, Stone Cold Crazy, Don't Stop Me Now, God Save the Queen	87.1	8th Place; Open Class; Finalist
2013	Carpe Caelum: Seize the Heavens; Interstellar Suite: “The Ship: Main Theme”, “Launch: Mission Control and Liftoff / Jumping To The Speed Of Light”, “Battle: Planning The Attack / Return Fire / The Last Missile” (Amin Bhatia), On the Backs of Angels (Dream Theater)	91.60	6th Place; Open Class; Finalist
2014	HEX; Garden of Magic/Come Little Children (James Horner), Aquarium (Saint-Saëns), Attacking Brides from Van Helsing (Alan Silvestri), Far From Heaven (Dream Theater), Hell Hounds from Chronicles of Riddick (Graeme Revell), Werewolf Trap from Van Helsing (Alan Silvestri)	92.40	6th Place; Open Class; Finalist
2015	EyeConic; Symphony for Brass and Percussion (Alfred Reed), Nessun Dorma (Giacomo Puccini), Heat of the Day (Pat Metheny), In Your Eyes (Peter Gabriel), My Favorite Things (Rodgers and Hammerstein), Symphony No. 9 in D minor 'Ode to Joy' (Ludwig van Beethoven), Ballet Sacra (David Holsinger)	93.83	5th Place; Open Class; Finalist
2016	Rhythmos - Motion of Life; Movement I - The Rhythm of the Heart: Artistry in Rhythm (Stan Kenton), Libertango (Astor Piazzolla); Movement II - The Rhythm of Breath: Gabriel's Oboe (Ennio Morricone); Movement III - The Rhythm of Motion: Finding and Believing (Pat Metheny); Movement IV - The Rhythm of Life: JoyRide (Michael Markowski)	92.35	6th Place; Open Class; Finalist
2017	Through the Glass Looking; Movement I - Shattered Glass: Children's Hour of Dream by Charles Mingus; Movement II - Reflections: Alone in a Crowd (from Pollock) by Jeff Beal / 1000 Airplanes on the Roof by Philip Glass; Movement III - Stained Glass: Hymn of Acxiom (Vienna Teng); Movement IV - Prism: Stained Glass by David Gillingham / The Firebird by Igor Stravinsky	96.63	2nd Place; Open Class; Finalist
2018	Chaos Theory; Symphony No. 5 by Ludwig van Beethoven / Master of Puppets by Metallica / Chameleon by Herbie Hancock / Demons by Heartist / Overture from Dancer in the Dark by Bjork / Yes by Don Ellis	95.625	3rd Place; Open Class; Finalist
2019	Of Gods and Goddesses; Movement I - "Poseidon" Moving Mountains by Thomas J. Bergson and The Winds of Poseidon by Robert W. Smith; Movement II - "Ares" Mars: The Bringer of War by Gustav Holst; Movement III - "Aphrodite" Based on Aphrodite Part II by William Chase; Movement IV - "Zeus" Ignition by Todd Stalter	96.150	2nd Place; Open Class; Finalist
2020	Season cancelled due to the COVID-19 pandemic		
2021	The Elements of Cool; Third Wind by Pat Metheny / Clarity by Zedd and Foxes / Minuano (Six Eight) by Pat Metheny / Original Music by Chris Romanowski, Drew Tucker & James Pluth	94.00	2nd Place; Open Class; Finalist
2022	Hyde and Seek; A Kaleidoscope of Mathematics by James Horner / Manners Maketh Man by Mathew Margeson / Hide and Seek by Imogen Heap / Serenada Schizophrana by Danny Elfman / Sacrificed Sons by Michael Portnoy	87.75	2nd Place; Open Class; Finalist
2023	Off With His Head; Bohemian Rhapsody, One Vision, Flash, Who Wants To Live Forever, Another One Bites The Dust, The Show Must Go On; All by Queen	91.25	4th Place; World Class; Finalist
2024	CiVilization; Tribal Music by African Drums Collective / The Rhythm of the Heat by Peter Gabriel / Scythian Suite/Ala and Lolly by Sergei Prokofiev / The Bioluminescence of the Night by James Horner / Run Boy Run by Yoann Lemoine / Becoming One of the People by James Horner	89.575 (Note: Starting in 2024, competitions were scored using DCI rules)	4th Place; World Class; Finalist
2025	10/6; The Quiet Room by Austin Hart (L'Orange) / Aha! by Imogen Heap / Mad World by Roland Orazbal / Where Is My Mind? by Charles Michael Kittridge Thomson IV (Black Francis) / Jack the Ripper by Michael Nyman / Serenada Schizophrana by Danny Elfman	91.625	4th Place; World Class; Finalist
2026	SinSations; Repertoire not available		

== CV Indoor ==
In 2015, Atlanta CV came out with an indoor percussion program, headed by percussion caption head and arranger Chris Romanowski. The ensemble competed in Winter Guard International (WGI) Percussion Independent World Class. The following year, 2016, the organization decided not to come out with an indoor line, partly due to a large majority of staff and potential members going on a trip to China that took place during the heat of the season. In 2017, Atlanta CV Indoor had returned to the competition arena, competing in WGI Percussion Independent Open Class. In 2018, Atlanta CV Indoor announced a merger with Q2, another Open Class group also based in Atlanta. As a result, staff and resources were brought together and CV Indoor would now be under the Q2 name.
