= Pacific Crest Drum and Bugle Corps =

Junior drum and bugle corps based in Los Angeles County

Pacific Crest
- Location: Diamond Bar and City of Industry, California
- Division: World Class
- Founded: 1993
- Executive Director: Stuart Pompel
- Corps Director: Chris Henderson
- Website: pacific-crest.org

The Pacific Crest Drum and Bugle Corps is a World Class competitive junior drum and bugle corps. Based in Diamond Bar, California and City of Industry, California, Pacific Crest is a member corps of Drum Corps International (DCI).

== History ==
Pacific Crest was founded in 1993 to serve the youth in the eastern part of Los Angeles County. Marching only 33 members in its inaugural season, the corps grew in size and ability while maintaining a local California profile. The corps did not perform outside its home state until traveling to Texas for two shows in 2000. The corps journeyed to the Northwest in 2002, and entered the national competition scene by attending its first DCI Championships at Orlando, Florida in 2003, where many drum corps fans unfamiliar with Pacific Crest were surprised as the corps reached the semifinal round. Although it now tours nationally each season, the corps has maintained a focus on servicing the Southern California region. Pacific Crest has advanced to DCI Semifinals in 2003, 2007–08, 2011–19, and 2022–25.

In addition to performing in DCI, Pacific Crest has also performed at several independent events, including with the Los Angeles Philharmonic at the Hollywood Bowl and in the 2019 Rose Parade.

== Sponsorship ==
Pacific Crest Drum and Bugle Corps is sponsored by the Pacific Crest Youth Arts Organization (PCYAO), a 501(c)(3) musical organization that has a Board of Directors, CEO, corps director, and staff assigned to carry out the organization's mission. Stuart Pompel serves as PCYAO's Chief Executive Officer, and has been involved with the organization since its inception. In addition to its flagship drum corps program, PCYAO has previously supported a winterguard unit (2002-2005) that competed in Winter Guard International (WGI) and the Winter Guard Association of Southern California (WGASC) circuits. The winterguard competed in the Independent World Class (2002), Independent Open Class (2003), and Independent A Class (2004-2005); the winterguard was a WGI finalist and WGASC gold medalist for the Independent A Class in 2004 and 2005. The organization also sponsors a suite of educational outreach programs, including workshops for marching band students and annual summer camps for current and prospective high school marching band student leaders. PCYAO receives a part of its funding from the Los Angeles County Board of Supervisors through the Los Angeles County Arts Commission.

== Show summary (1994–2026) ==
Key
Pale green background indicates DCI World Class Semifinalist

Year	Repertoire	World Championships	
Year	Repertoire	Score	Placement
1994	Backdraft; It's All Right With Me, Show Me Your Firetruck, Haven't You Heard & Ya Gotta Make Your Own Luck; All from Backdraft by Hans Zimmer	Did not attend World Championships	
1995	Music from Metroscape; Double Lattes & the LA Times, Heavy Traffic Reported, Bottom Rung of the Corporate Ladder, Alternate Route Suggested & Back Home; All by Dale Leaman	Did not attend World Championships	
1996	Jekyll and Hyde; I Need to Know, Take Me As I Am & Dangerous Game (from Jekyll & Hyde) by Leslie Bricusse & Frank Wildhorn / The World Has Gone Insane (from Dracula: The Concept Recording) by Frank Wildhorn / Confrontation & Alive (from Jekyll & Hyde) by Leslie Bricusse & Frank Wildhorn	Did not attend World Championships	
1997	Frankenstein; To Think of a Story, The Creation, The Escape, Friendless & Evil Stitched to Evil; All from Mary Shelley's Frankenstein by Patrick Doyle	Did not attend World Championships	
1998	Hamlet; The Ghost, Death & Anguish, I Loved You Once, What Players Are They & Madness; All from Hamlet by Patrick Doyle	Did not attend World Championships	
1999	Dracula; Incident At Charing X Station, Dance Of The Effigies, Seduction At Castle Dracula, The Crypt & The Death of Dracula; All from Dracula by Philip Feeney	Did not attend World Championships	
2000	Joan of Arc; Voices of Light; A Call To Arms; The Siege of Chinon; The Miracle; Sacraments; Coronation; Betrayal, Trial and Torture & The Fire of the Dove Angels in the Cleansing Flames; All from Voices of Light by Richard Einhorn	Did not attend World Championships	
2001	Age of Empires; The Adoration of Veless and Ala, The Enemy God and the Dance of the Pagan Monsters & The Glorious Departure of Lolly and the Sun's Cortège (from Scythian Suite) by Sergei Prokofiev / Her Name Was Merit (from The Egyptian) by Alfred Newman / The Reprimand, Following Tzipporah & Red Sea (from The Prince of Egypt) by Hans Zimmer & Stephen Schwartz / The Battle & Barbarian Horde (from Gladiator) by Hans Zimmer & Lisa Gerrard	Did not attend World Championships	
2002	Reinvention; Atmadja (from Quidam) by Benoit Jutras / Ravendhi (from Dralion) by Violaine Corradi / Seisuoso (from Quidam) by Benoit Jutras / Ombra (from Dralion) by Violaine Corradi / Incantation (from Quidam) and Distorted & Urban (from La Nouba) by Benoit Jutras	Did not attend World Championships	
2003	Invocacion a Poderosos; Moonlight on the Parana, Invocation to the Spirits of Power & Dawn; All from Panambí, Op. 1 by Alberto Ginastera	79.300	17th Place; World Class; Semifinalist
2004	On Dangerous Ground; The Man Who Knew Too Much, The Snows of Kilimanjaro, Baghdad (from The 7th Voyage of Sinbad) & Death Hunt (from On Dangerous Ground); All by Bernard Hermann	77.850	19th Place; World Class
2005	Fluid States: Vapor, Solid, Liquid; Four Sea Interludes (from Peter Grimes) by Benjamin Britten / Sinfonia Antarctica by Ralph Vaughan Williams	77.250	19th Place; World Class
2006	From the City of Angels; Prologue: Theme from City of Angels, Double Talk Walk, With Every Breath I Take & I'm Nothing Without You; All from City of Angels by Cy Coleman & David Zippel	74.900	21st Place; World Class
2007	What Happens In Vegas... Viva Las Vegas by Doc Pomus & Mort Shuman / Love for Sale (from The New Yorkers) by Cole Porter / Angel Eyes by Matt Dennis & Earl Brent / Luck Be A Lady (from Guys and Dolls) by Frank Loesser	79.525	17th Place; World Class; Semifinalist
2008	Primality: The Rituals of Passion; Selections from Blood Diamond by James Newton Howard / Selections from The Wind and the Lion by Jerry Goldsmith / Selections from Dralion by Violaine Corradi	79.650	17th Place; World Class; Semifinalist
2009	El Corazon de la Gente; Selections by Carlos Chavez / Pampeana No. 3 – Impetuosamente, Variaciones Concertantes & Pequena Danza by Alberto Ginastera / Symphonic Dances (Danzas Sinfonicas): Gregoriana by Julián Orbón	79.050	19th Place; World Class
2010	Maze; Machu Picchu by Satoshi Yagisawa / Asphalt Cocktail by John Mackey / Sam's Gone (from I Am Legend) by James Newton Howard / Turbine by John Mackey	80.350	18th Place; World Class
2011	Push, Pull, Twist, Turn; Lauds (Praise High Day) by Ron Nelson / Push by Robert W. Smith / Adagietto, Symphony No. 5 by Gustav Mahler / The Mechanical Ballet (Unknown) / Serenada Schizophrana by Danny Elfman / AirLink by Jack Stamp	77.750	18th Place; World Class; Semifinalist
2012	The Spectrum; Butterfly Yellow & Tarantella Red (from Bright Colored Dances) by Lewis J. Buckley / The Red Machine by Peter Graham / Yellow by Guy Berryman, Jonny Buckland, Will Champion & Chris Martin / Blue Sapphire (from Colours) by Roger Cichy / End Credits (from Green Lantern: First Flight) by Robert Kral / True Colors by Billy Steinberg & Tom Kelly	80.250	16th Place; World Class; Semifinalist
2013	Transfixed; Fix a Heart by Emanuel Kiriakou & Priscilla Renea / Instinctive Travels by Michael Markowski / Drum Music by John Mackey	82.300	16th Place; World Class; Semifinalist
2014	No Strings Attached; Overture to Orpheus in the Underworld by Jacques Offenbach / Firefly by Ryan George / Shadowplay (from Kà) by René Dupéré / A Tango by John M. Meehan & Mike Huestis	78.900	20th Place; World Class; Semifinalist
2015	The Catalyst; Scythian Suite by Sergei Prokofiev / Liberi Fatali (from Final Fantasy) by Nobuo Uematsu / Enjoy the Silence by Martin Gore (Depeche Mode) / Angels in the Architecture by Frank Ticheli	74.925	21st Place; World Class; Semifinalist
2016	The Union; Foundry: Original Composition by John Meehan, Pete Lucero & Brian Dinkel; Working: Aha! by Imogen Heap; Space Between: Fix You by Jonny Buckland, Will Champion, Chris Martin & Guy Berryman (Coldplay); Engine: Original Music by Pete Lucero & Brian Dinkel; Train: Point Blank by Paul Dooley / Last Train Home by Pat Metheny	78.875	19th Place; World Class; Semifinalist
2017	Golden State of Mind "California Dreamin'" by John Phillips & Michelle Phillips / Kaleidoscope of Mathematics (from A Beautiful Mind) by James Horner / Arrival of the Birds (from The Crimson Wing: Mystery of the Flamingos) by Jason Swincoe (The Cinematic Orchestra) / Alfonso Muskedunder by Todd Terje / Moving On (from Lost) by Michael Giacchino	78.000	21st Place; World Class; Semifinalist
2018	Here’s to the Ones Who Dream; Planetarium (from La La Land) by Justin Hurwitz / Overture & Waltz for Peppy (from The Artist) by Ludovic Bource / The 20th Century Fox Mambo (from Smash) by Marc Shaiman & Scott Wittman / Audition (The Fools Who Dream) (from La La Land) by Justin Hurwitz, Benj Pasek & Justin Paul / Pretty Peppy (from The Artist) by Ludovic Bource / Epilogue (from La La Land) by Justin Hurwitz	79.300	20th Place; World Class; Semifinalist
2019	Everglow; Awakening: Original Music by Bradley Kerr Green, Jonathan Zuniga & Ezekiel Lanser; Adventure: Ready Player One by Alan Silvestri; Longing: Meta by Bradley Kerr Green, Jonathan Zuniga & Ezekiel Lanser; Trials: View From Olympus by John Psathas; Heartbreak: Chinatown by Jerry Goldsmith; Rebirth: Insight by Haywyre (Martin Sebastian Vogt); Acceptance & Departure: The Grand Finale (from Edward Scissorhands) by Danny Elfman	85.350	14th Place; World Class; Semifinalist
2020	Season canceled due to the COVID-19 pandemic		
2021	eX; Theme from The Rocketeer by James Horner / Feeling Good by Leslie Bricusse & Anthony Newley / Life on Mars by David Bowie	No scored competitions	
2022	Welcome to the Void; Finale (from Swiss Army Man) by Andy Hull & Robert McDowell / The Void by Bradley Kerr Green, Jonathan Zuniga & Ezekiel Lanser / Enjoy the Silence by Martin Gore / Intruder by Peter Gabriel / Where Is My Mind? by Black Francis	80.250	19th Place; World Class; Semifinalist
2023	Goddess; Engulfed Cathedral by Claude Debussy / Danse Diabolique by Joseph Hellmesberger Jr. / Watershed by Vienna Teng / Gloriosa by Yasuhide Ito / Scythian Suite by Sergei Prokofiev	85.050	14th Place; World Class; Semifinalist
2024	The Broken Column; Benediction and Dream by Elliot Goldenthal / Burning Red by Elliot Goldenthal / Harmonielehre by John Adams / California Counterpoint: The Twittering Machine by Cindy McTee / Ramalama Bang Bang by Matthew John Herbert & Roisin Murphy / Passage by Cynthia Yih Shih / ...And the Mountains Rising Nowhere by Joseph Schwantner	86.350	13th Place; World Class; Semifinalist
2025	It Sin Our Nature; Fantasie by Oskar Schuster / Symphony No. 10 by Dmitri Shostakovich / How I'd Kill by Cowboy Malfoy / Jealous by Labyrinth / Better Have My Money by Rihanna / Dies Irae by Giuseppe Verdi / To Die For (from The Lion King) by Hans Zimmer	84.825	15th Place; World Class; Semifinalist
2026	Irresistible; The Great Refusal by Colin Self / Moth by Viet Cuong / Moonlight Sonata by Ludwig van Beethoven / Goodnight Moon by Eric Whitacre / Everything in Its Right Place by Radiohead / Heaven (Butterflies) by Jacob Collier	86.663	13th Place; World Class; Semifinalist
