= Joseph Curiale =

Background information
- Born: Joseph James Curiale; July 1, 1955 (age 70); Bridgeport, Connecticut, U.S.
- Genres: Classical, Jazz, R&B, Pop, Electronic Music
- Occupation: Composer · Producer · Conductor · Songwriter · Arranger
- Instrument: Synthesizer · Trumpet · Singing · Keyboards
- Years active: 1977–present

Joseph Curiale (born July 1, 1955) is an American composer, producer, songwriter, arranger and conductor.

== Education ==
Born in Bridgeport, Connecticut, Curiale attended the University of Bridgeport and earned a Degree in Music Education in 1976, studying jazz arranging with Neil Slater. In 2009, Curiale completed his Master of Music Composition at the University of Nebraska–Lincoln. He completed a PhD in Music Composition from the University of Minnesota in 2015.

== Career ==
Television

From 1982 to 1992, Curiale worked as an arranger and composer for the Tonight Show Starring Johnny Carson and his song "Sick of the Blues" was used as one of closing the themes.

In 1990, Curiale was nominated for a Primetime Emmy for Outstanding Music Direction for Sammy Davis Jr.'s 60th Anniversary Celebration with his arrangement of "You Were There" being sung by Michael Jackson.

Curiale composed the opening and closing theme for Nick News with Linda Ellerbee.

Film

In 1983, Curiale was hired as the first staff songwriter at Columbia Pictures. Curiale contributed music and songs to movies such as Roxanne, Breakin', Summer School, and Quicksilver.

Classical

Curiale wrote two symphonic compositions: Awakening and The Music of Life. Awakening was recorded in 1997 by the Royal Philharmonic Orchestra and The Music of Life, in 2001 by the London Symphony Orchestra. The Music of Life premiered in the United States in April, 2002 and was performed by the Akron Symphony Orchestra. Curiale has also composed separate pieces, most notably “Wind River” which was commissioned by the University of Wyoming Symphony Orchestra in commemoration of the new millennium. He also composed the piece “Blue Windows” written for trumpet and orchestra, and originally performed by Doc Severinsen.

Curiale has guest conducted his work with the Hollywood, Milwaukee, Phoenix, London and Royal Philharmonic orchestras among several others. Many of his compositions incorporate Japanese themes and traditional Japanese instruments, as well as American movie themes including those of film noir and more recent periods.

== Awards and nominations ==
Emmy Nomination

- 1990: Primetime Emmy Award for Outstanding Music Direction – "Sammy Davis Jr. 60th Anniversary Celebration"

== Selected works ==
- Gates of Gold (1994)
- Wind River (I Am) (2001)
- Blue Windows (feat. Doc Severinson) (2002)
- Joy (2005)

== Discography ==
- Awakening (1997)
- The Music of Life (2001)
- In Autumn (2016)
- Dinkytown (2017)
- In the Sound (2019)

== Books ==
- Curiale, Joseph (September 22, 2011). The Spirit of Creativity. Amazon Digital Services LLC. ASIN B005PR592W.
- Curiale, Joseph (October 26, 2011). The Wisdom of Creativity. Amazon Digital Services LLC. ASIN B0062F6GQ4.
