= Technology in Drum Corps International =

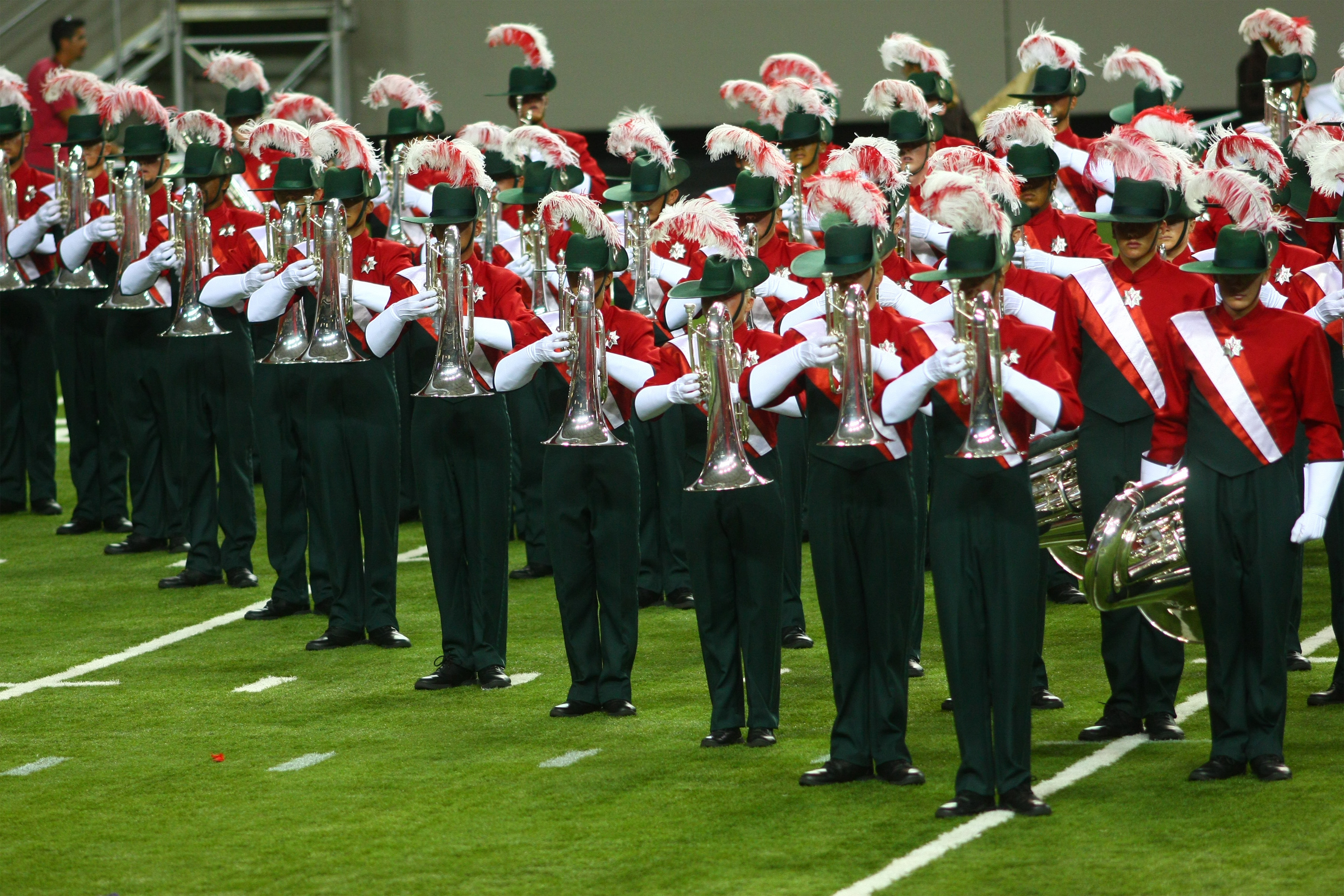
The Santa Clara Vanguard drum and bugle corps, 2008.

The implementation of sound technology by Drum Corps International is a phenomenon in the twenty-first century marching arts. Since 2004, many corps have used electronics to amplify, alter, and add to the sound of their ensembles.

Technology in Drum Corps can be divided into the categories of amplification and electronic instrumentation. Amplification and electronics were prohibited by Drum Corps International (DCI) for decades. Once these technologies were approved, however, they swiftly changed the landscape of music selection, instrumentation, and show design in drum corps. Modern corps use microphones and speakers to support their sound. They rely less on acoustic instruments, using electronics like synthesizers to create sound and imitate instruments inaccessible to the activity.

== History ==
Though amplification and electronic instruments were used in other areas of the marching arts long before, such sound and music technology was not permitted by DCI in the twentieth century; the use of it would result in direct penalties. Thus, technology was largely non-existent.

Before any rule changes occurred, discussion over whether electronics should be allowed in drum corps was present. One corps, the Boston Crusaders, even used a synthesizer in their 1985 production despite the rule. The corps, playing the Beverly Hills Cop theme on the electronic instrument, received a two-point penalty at semi-finals, resulting in a 20th-place finish.

Former director of The Cadets, George Hopkins, first proposed ruling for amplification and electronic instruments in 1989. After years of rejection and discussion, these two categories were finally divided into separate issues. In the winter of 2003 (for implementation in the 2004 season), the DCI Board of Directors approved the use of only amplification in a 12–8 vote.

In the following 2004 season, nine of the top twelve corps used amplification. By 2005, amplification was employed by every corps participating in DCI Finals.

As a separate ruling, the use of electronic instruments was permitted as part of a new section appended to the rule book in January 2009. Some of the exact text of the section reads as follows.

"4.8 Use of Electronic Equipment

4.8.1 Terminology:

- “Music” (or “Musical”) shall be defined as the organization of melodic, harmonic and/or rhythmic sound through time.

- An “Electronic Instrument” shall be defined as any piece of electronic equipment that produces a “Musical” sound."

"4.8.2 Music from Electronic Instruments is allowed given that the Music is being performed live, in real time during the performance."

The section also defines and prohibits prerecorded music sequences and loops. It does, however, allow for the use of prerecorded sound effects and speaking voices, given that permission is obtained where there is copyright.

After this ruling, many corps began experimenting with the integration of electronic instruments into the traditional sound of brass and battery in drum corps.

== Technology ==
=== Microphones ===
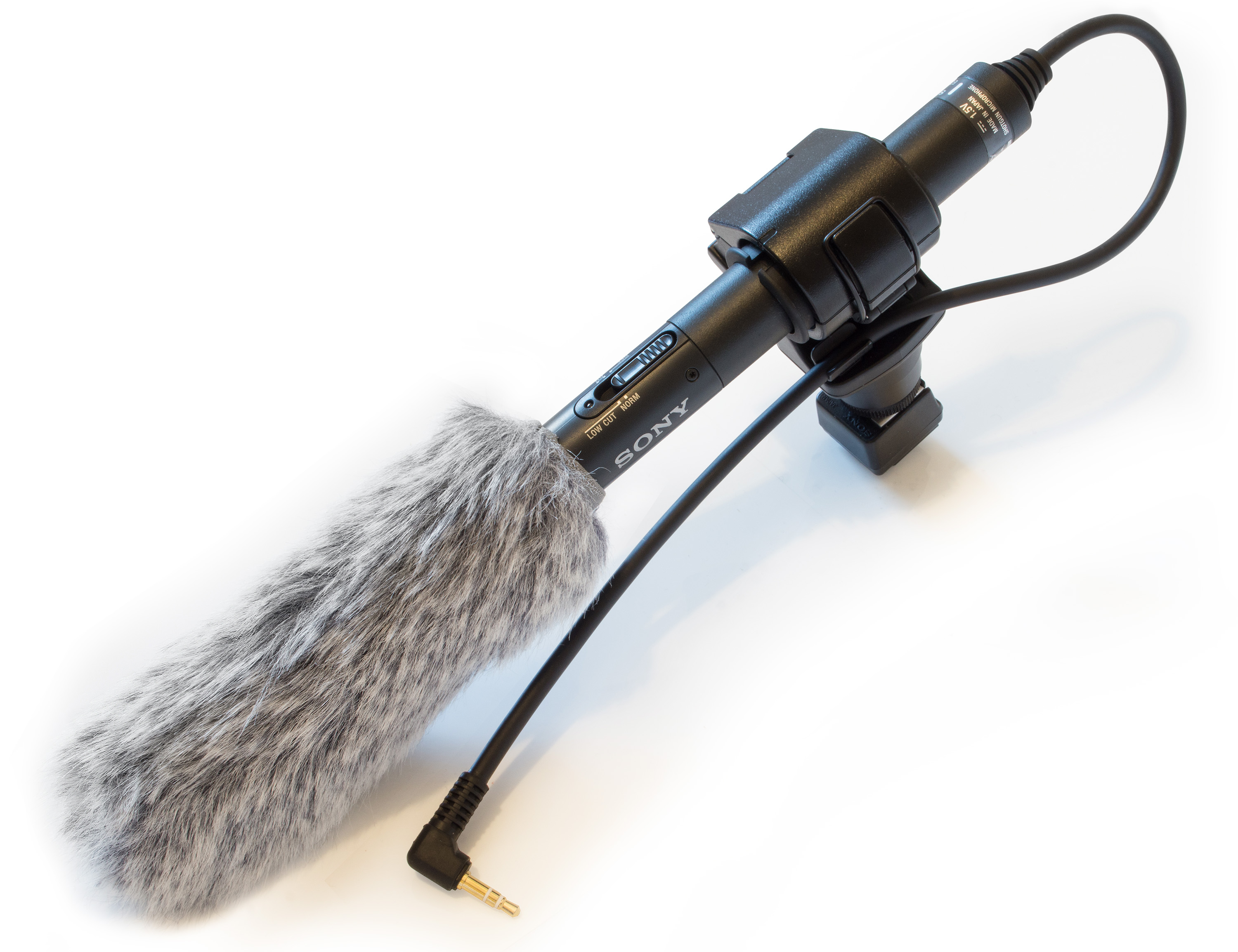
A shotgun microphone equipped with a windscreen.

Various types of microphones are used in drum corps for the purposes of amplification and digital sound processing. In the front ensemble, mics are mounted on the top and/or bottom of large instruments like marimbas and vibraphones; additionally, standing mics are positioned as to assist the sound of auxiliary percussion instruments. On the field, some members of the brass section are equipped with personal microphones which can be remotely toggled for the purposes of solos and short features.

Another type of microphone, the shotgun mic, came into widespread use starting in 2017. Shotgun microphones allow for capturing highly directional, long distance sound along their axis, blocking sound on the sides. In a modern drum corps performance, these are commonly lined along the front sideline and covered with windscreens. They are primarily used for strategically accenting section features at distinct locations on the field at any time.

=== Mixers ===
Before being run to speakers, sound from the field is often put through a digital or analog mixer board, which includes faders and mutes to adjust volume and process audio. Examples of mixers used in drum corps are the PreSonus StudioLive RM mixer and CS18AI control surface.

=== Speakers ===
Speakers, though they pose many problems of uneven sound across stadium seating and in judging boxes, can be found in nearly every modern drum corps show. Most commonly, cables run from mounted and standing microphones to several stacks of speakers along the sideline on either side of the pit. There has, however, been experimentation with respect to speaker placement by several corps. Speakers have temporarily been placed in front and within the front ensemble. The Blue Devils tried for a few years to mount powered speakers and mixers to large mallet instruments. The 2009 Blue Knights positioned speakers behind performance space for the effect of surround sound.

Corps currently employ point source speakers, though Michael Dunwoody (the Blue Devils' sound reinforcement consultant) and others see a shift to small format line array speaker systems in the future. Line source speakers would allow for a more even, authentic wash of sound across audiences.

=== Electronic instruments ===
- Keyboard-style synthesizers and MIDI controllers are the most widely used form of electronic instrumentation in the marching arts. Synthesizers are used not only for harmonic and melodic support but also for sampling sound effects. These sounds can be pre-loaded onto the instrument or can be sampled from a computer program like Logic or MainStage. Many corps open one or two additional front ensemble membership positions reserved strictly for synth players.
  - MIDI controllers also come in a mallet percussion format, where xylophone-like keys are struck with keyboard mallets to produce computer-generated tones and sounds. These sometimes can be sustained with a pedal, as on a vibraphone. The most popular brands of mallet percussion MIDI controllers are MalletStation, MalletKAT, and Xylosynth.
- Electronic drums, most often in the form of a traditional drum set, are used by many corps.
- Samplers allow a performer to strike a pad, such as a DTXM12 in order to generate sound electronically or to play recorded sounds during a performance.
- Bass guitar and (less often) electric guitar, are used by some corps.

== Application ==
=== Impact ===
The use of technology has changed the musical landscape of world class drum corps.

The low registers of keyboards and synths are used to support low brass sections in many shows, leading to an overall more bass-heavy sound in modern drum corps.

In the past, mallet percussion instruments like marimbas, vibraphones, and xylophones had to be played with hard rubber, plastic, brass, or aluminum mallets in order to be heard over the brass section. The keys had to be struck forcefully, with large stick height. This drastically affected both the quality of sound and the technique of the percussionists. With the introduction of amplification, different playing techniques could be employed while soft felt mallets were added to the performance arsenal. This broadened musical selection to more delicate styles in drum corps, and it brought out much of the native acoustic sound of mallet instruments. In addition, hand instruments like bongo and conga could be played and heard with traditional technique rather than with hard felt mallets.

These changes, along with the use of keyboard sampling, expanded the range of instrumentation and musical selection. Drum corps were able to sample more exotic instruments and sounds. Piano, organ, strings, narration, ship horns, and natural sounds like running water are all included in the vast array of sonic enhancement for modern drum corps. With these tools, storytelling became a more popular style in drum corps shows.

Additionally, members had to be added to drum corps in the form of synthesizer players and sound engineers who use mixer boards to control microphones and amplification. In 2000, most front ensembles in DCI Finals had 8 or 9 members, with the most being 12. By 2013, most had 12 to 15, and the number is only growing.

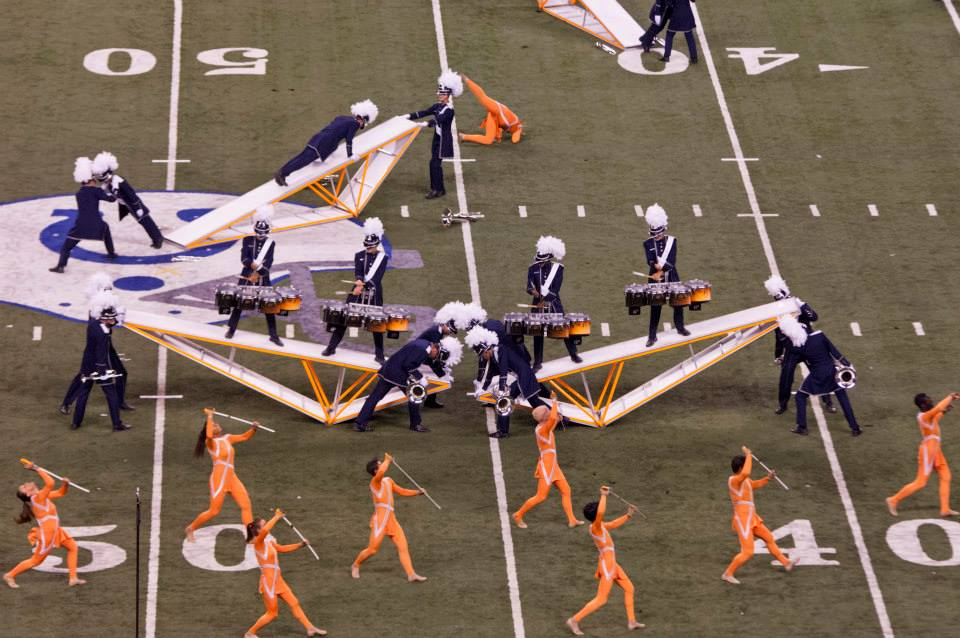
A drum feature from the Bluecoats 2014, Tilt.

=== Notable cases of application ===
- Carolina Crown was the first corps to amplify the human voice - their 2004 production, Bohemia, featured mic'd poetry and singing.
- The 2004 Boston Crusaders became the first to narrate a show in The Composition of Color.
- In 2007 and 2008, The Cadets heavily emphasized amplified narration in their shows.
- In the closer of their 2014 show entitled Tilt, the Bluecoats featured pitch bends of the brass section. The brass prerecorded the chords and allowed a synthesizer to manipulate the recording, creating the effect of a live acoustic pitch bend.
- The 2015, Santa Clara Vanguard employed a theremin, an instrument played not through physical contact but by manipulating an electronic circuit through the air. A thereminist's hands act as ground plates of capacitors in an L-C circuit.
- The Bluecoats, in their 2017 production Jagged Line, were able to execute a tenor drum feature in which five players were spread across 20 yards. This was made possible by in-ear monitors worn by percussionists.
- A prerecorded voice-over in the 2017 Blue Devils 60th anniversary show, Metamorph, played a speech given in 1971 by the corps' founder, Jerry Seawright.
- In 2022, the Bluecoats included a keytar soloist in their show, Riffs and Revelations.
