= Drum and lyre corps =

In the Philippines, drum and lyre corps is a marching ensemble consisting of strictly percussion instruments, color guards, and a majorette section. The Color guards and majorettes are collectively called the aux (auxiliary) section since they bring the visuals to the band. The drum and lyre corps originated in the Philippines, as an economical alternative to regular brass bands or drum and bugle corps. The instrumentation of drum and lyre corps consists of a typical marching band (snare, tenor, bass drums, and cymbals) with the bell lyre section. The lyre sections consist of bell lyres or glockenspiels, as well as vibraphones and marimbas. During competitions, drum and lyre corps usually include a pit section which consists of the typical pit instruments used by drum and bugle corps.

== Composition ==
Standard drum and lyre corps has 4 to 48 members. There is one leader, who serves as the conductor and leads the band in parades and exhibitions. They typically use a baton to lead the ensemble.

The main part of the band has two sections: the drum sections and the lyre sections.

The lyre section makes up the majority of the band. They play the melodic parts. A member of the band that consists of this section is called a lyrist. In bigger bands, the band may add a bass lyre, a bell lyre with a lower range of keys, and sometimes a grand lyre, a bell lyre with a wide range of keys.

The drum section serves as the accompaniment of the band. It is composed with a group of snare drums, multiple tenor drums and bass drums (melodic and non-melodic) and sometimes clash cymbals. Sometimes, they add tambourines, woodblocks, triangles, and maracas in this section and assign them to a specific member carrying a snare drum or a lyre.

Most drum and lyre corps in the Philippines sport a color guard section similar to US modern drum and bugle corps.

Drum and lyre corps include Majorettes and Color Guards as well, these members add visual appeal to the band.

Majorettes are performers who combine twirling a baton and dance movements, they may also have other props such as a flag, etc.

Color guards add color and visual to the band, holding colorful flags while doing routines and steps.

== Competitions ==
Numerous drum and lyre competitions are held in the Philippines commonly in each municipality or city. In a parade, they are always accompanied by majorettes or color guards. They compete in the form of exhibitions. The biggest governing body in the National Drum & Lyre corps scene is the Philippine Drum & Lyre Associates Incorporated, established in 2011 and headed by Vincent Ace S. Mangosing as founding chairman. They stage yearly national competitions. The most recent one was May 13, 2017, in the Strike Gymnasium in Bacoor Cavite in cooperation with the City Government of Bacoor. Competitions are also held in many towns and cities in the Philippines commonly in celebration of a festival.

Naga hosts the Regional Drum & Lyre and Majorette Exhibition of the Bicol region regularly. This event is hosted by BFARCIL. The latest event was on September 12, 2015.
