= DCJ =

DCJ may refer to:

- Department of Communities and Justice, a department of the New South Wales government, Australia
- Drum Corps Japan
