= Indoor percussion ensemble =

Type of percussion marching ensemble

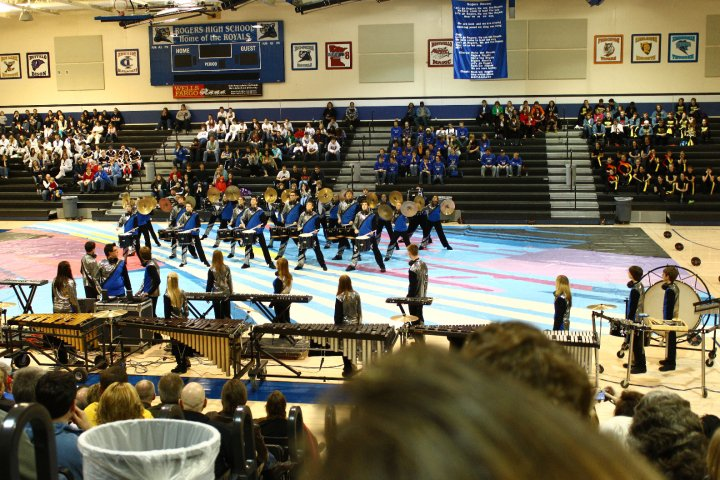
The Eagan High School indoor percussion ensemble

An indoor percussion ensemble or indoor drumline is a type of marching ensemble consisting of battery and front ensemble instruments. It differs itself from a traditional percussion ensemble by not only on musical performance, but on theatrics and marching. Although most indoor percussion ensembles are affiliated with high schools (also known as scholastic groups), there are also many independent groups that draw participants from a large area and are independently funded. Independent groups typically start rehearsing in October, while high school groups typically start after their fall marching band season ends. Because of this, the activity is often called winter percussion or winterline.

== History ==
The athletic arts were looking for a sport that could challenge and excite skilled musicians, so they started creating their own styles all over the world. Since then, marching percussion has advanced and moved into auditoriums and gymnasiums as percussion ensembles looked for ways to maintain their skills during the winter months when performing outdoors on football fields was not practical. Following in the footsteps of indoor guard ensembles, indoor percussion ensembles arrange music and motion appropriate for a more intimate setting. The activity is enjoyed throughout the United States and Japan, as Winter Guard International (WGI) provides many regional and national opportunities to compete. Percussion ensembles first appeared in WGI shows in 1992, and the theatrics, sets, and music selection has advanced throughout the activity's history. There are many organizations unaffiliated with WGI that hold smaller regional shows all over the world.

As the number of ensembles that competed in WGI competitions grew, different skill level divisions ranging from A class to World class.

Competition became international when Color Guard Netherlands (CGN) introduced indoor percussion in Europe. In 2008 CGN hosted the first WGI Regional for percussion outside of North America. Since then, WGI has expanded even further to parts of Asia and Africa.

== Music ==
Music is arranged based on original works as well as recreations of movie themes, popular music, classical music, and more. Instrumentation is anything that would or could be used under the percussion category of any musical group. This includes instruments such as snare drums, tenors, bass drums, cymbals, xylophones, marimbas, vibraphones, tambourines, chimes, timpani, drum kits, and other similar instruments. Electronic instruments such as guitars, bass guitars, theremins, and synthesizers are also allowed in most competitive circuits. Some groups will also use prerecorded sound samples such as a short jingle or a cappella singing which is typically accompanied by the front ensemble. Spoken word via microphone or a recording on a sampler is used on occasion as well. In many cases, percussion groups will use unconventional instruments including trash cans, barrels, pipes, brooms, and other objects to output desired sound effects.

== Concert vs. marching ==
There are two types of indoor percussion ensembles. A concert percussion group consists of only a front ensemble. With these groups there is very little movement other than the motion needed for playing the instruments. The other type of indoor percussion group is known as marching percussion. These groups also include a front ensemble but add a marching ensemble for more movement. The marching ensembles have a much more visual aspect to their performances which includes marching, visual theatrics, and much more depending on the show theme.

== Marching ==
A notable difference with marching in indoor percussion is the use of toe-down marching instead of roll stepping. Marching within indoor percussion is much more fluid in contrast with corps style marching. Due to the fact that the activity is being performed in a gymnasium means the performers are closer to the audience and requires a more fluid approach to convey the type of energy needed for a more personal performer-crowd interaction. Since each group has their own tarp with a specific design, called a floor, most groups use some type of grid to set their positions, or dots. The ensemble member is also required to 'guide' to the others, meaning to use the other marchers as a reference point and keep with formation using peripheral vision. Indoor ensembles may even incorporate dance moves and choreography into their shows for a more dramatic effect.

== Set designs ==
Depending on the financial situation and the creativity of the design team, sets can be created to help the audience engage the performance to a greater depth. Painted floor coverings and backdrops are used to portray a story as the group performs the music in and around the props. Most upper-level groups have large nylon-vinyl tarps that cover an entire gym floor.

Sets must also be designed to function within the space provided. If a performance is in a gym, the materials must be able to enter the gym. If the performance is in a stadium type gym, then doors and openings are easier to access.

There are strict rules on the area sets that can be placed on and the time a group is allowed to set them up. Violations of these rules result in score deductions.

== Uniforms ==
At first, indoor percussion ensembles wore traditional marching band uniforms. As shows and concepts increased in detail, uniforms were left behind, and theatrical costumes took their place. Uniforms could be as simple as jeans and T-shirts for a rendition of West Side Story or as complicated as special jumpsuits with chains and feathers to portray a show like Cirque Du Soleil, though many groups use more modern uniforms.

== Winter marching ensembles ==
A more recent development in the indoor percussion ensemble genre has been the introduction of mixed-group ensembles, combining winter guard with indoor percussion ensembles, sometimes referred to as winter marching ensemble.
