= Marching arts =

The marching arts are a collection of fine arts related activities that are closely associated with wind music. The marching arts include marching band, drum corps, Mummers String Bands, pep band, color guard, winter guard, and indoor percussion. All of these activities are supported at both the high school, collegiate, and adult levels.

Although marching and pep bands initially existed to fill the role of halftime entertainment at football games, the modern marching arts, while maintaining their enduring traditions, have grown into stand-alone activities. The marching arts often participate in competitive events with panels of adjudicators assessing the groups on a number of captions. Some of the captions often assessed in competition are: music performance (ensemble), music performance (individual), music effect, visual performance, visual effect, general effect, color guard, percussion, brass, woodwinds, and drum majors, among others.

== Governing bodies ==
Several governing bodies exist to adjudicate and promote the marching arts:

=== Drum corps ===
- Drum Corps Associates
- Drum Corps Europe
- Drum Corps International
- Drum Corps Japan
- Drum Corps Latin America

=== Marching band ===
- Bands of America
- USBands
- Tournament of Bands
- Mid-America Competing Band Directors Association
- New York State Field Band Confrence (NYSFBC)

=== Winter guard ===
- Winter Guard International
