= Drum Corps Japan =

Drum Corps Japan (DCJ) is the administering organization for drum and bugle corps in Japan.

Previously held indoors, most DCJ competitions are now held outdoors, similar to those in DCI.

== Competition scoring ==
Competition scoring in the DCJ circuit is divided into three categories: music, visual, and effect. Each of these categories is further broken into two sections.

Music scores are divided into a brass caption score and a percussion caption score and reflect the level of musical execution by corps members. The two scores are added together to give the corps' overall music score.

Visual scores are divided into a color guard caption score and a performance score and reflect the level of movement execution by corps members. The totals in these two categories are similarly added together for a corps' overall visual score.

Effect scores reflect the overall impact of the show, both musically and visually. Both musical effect and visual effect scores are made up of a repertoire score and a show score. Musical effect and visual effect are scored separately, then added together to produce the corps' overall effect score.

Finally, the effect, music, and visual scores are added together and any penalties are deducted from this total. The resulting number is the corps' final score for that event.

== Member Corps ==
As of the 2017 season, DCJ's active member corps include the following organizations from the following locations:

- IMPERIAL SOUND, Aichi
- SENDAI Verdures, Fukushima
- THE YOKOHAMA SCOUTS, Kanagawa
- Yokohama INSPIRES, Kanagawa
- Yokohama INSPIRES Alumni, Kanagawa
- White Galaxy, Kanagawa
- Kamakura Women's University Secondary/High School Marching Band, Kanagawa
- White Shooting Stars (Kanagawa Prefectural Shonandai High School Wind Instrument Division), Kanagawa
- JOKERS, Kyoto
- Legend of ANGELS, Osaka
- GENESIS, Saitama
- SONIC LANCERS, Saitama
- Lifeguard II, Shizuoka
- PHOENIX REGIMENT, Tokyo
- Pride of SOKA, Tokyo
- Tokyo Phoenix, Tokyo

Previously active organizations include:

- Maximum
- Kosei Refinado
- SOKA Renaissance Vanguard
- Cherry Blossoms
- G-Pulsation
