= Drum Corps United Kingdom =

- Drum Corps United Kingdom Main Logo
- Location: United Kingdom
- Founded: 1980
- Directors: Lee Jex; Mark Nicholson; Jason Oates
- Current champions: Open: Beeches
- Website: dcuk.org.uk

Drum Corps United Kingdom (DCUK) is a governing organization for drum and bugle corps in the United Kingdom. DCUK operates the British drum corps circuit which holds drum and bugle corps competitions for corps across the country. It is part of the national charity Marching & Performing Arts UK.

DCUK is a strategic partner of Drum Corps International and through this partnership offers DrumLine Battle and SoundSport in the UK.

== About ==
Competitive Corps participate in competitions between the months of June to September, traditionally the British Drum Corps Championships takes place on the weekend before last in September. Competitions occur at sports arenas (i.e. athletic tracks, football or rugby grounds) and are judged by a panel of approved and training volunteer Judges on general effect, visual performance, and musical performance. Every year, each drum corps prepares a single new show, approximately 8–15 minutes in length, and carefully refines this throughout the entire summer year. This focus on a singular show takes advantage of the large amount of time needed to honing and refining a modern drum corps program, with a momentum that continues to build up to the last performance of the season, the Drum Corps United Kingdom Championships. DCUK finals has been held at the Select Security Stadium since 2013.

== Adjudication ==
DCUK utilizes the adjudication manual published by Drum Corps Europe which is based on three broad categories: Music, Visual and Effect. Each of the categories are further subdivided into reference criteria, or captions. All sanctioned competitions require nine adjudicators, including an adjudicator responsible for Timing & Penalties.

Category	Caption	+	Caption	+	Points
Music	Field Music (20) / 2	+	Ensemble Music (20) / 2	=	30.00
Music	Field Percussion (20) / 2	+	Ensemble Music (20) / 2	=	30.00
Visual	Field Visual (20) / 2	+	Ensemble Visual (20) / 2	=	30.00
Visual	Color Guard (20) / 2	+	Ensemble Visual (20) / 2	=	30.00
Effect	Music Effect (20)	+	Visual Effect (20)	=	40.00
			Subtotal		100.00
			Timing & Penalties		0.00
			Total		100.00

== Past champions ==
Below is a list of champions organized by class.

Year	Open Class	—	—	—
1980 (1st)	Dagenham Crusaders ^{(1)}			
1981 (2nd)	Dagenham Crusaders ^{(2)}			
1982 (3rd)	Dagenham Crusaders ^{(3)}			
1983 (4th)	Green Lancers			
1984 (5th)	Imperial Knights			
Year	Open Class	A Class	—	—
1985 (6th)	Blue Barons	Concord		
1986 (7th)	Conquest Alliance ^{(1)} (and); Dagenham Crusaders ^{(4)}	Waterlooville		
1987 (8th)	Conquest Alliance ^{(2)} (DCUK); Concord ^{(1)} (BDCF)	Kenilworth Corp D'Elite		
1988 (9th)	Southern Knights (DCUK); Concord ^{(2)} (BDCF)	British Gypsum		
1989 (10th)	Blue Eagles ^{(1)}	Caversham Ambassadors		
1990 (11th)	Blue Eagles ^{(2)}	No competition		
1991 (12th)	Blue Eagles ^{(3)}	New Surrey Raiders		
1992 (13th)	Blue Eagles ^{(4)}	Valiant		
1993 (14th)	Senators ^{(1)}	Black Knights		
1994 (15th)	Blue Eagles ^{(5)}	Saxon Shadows		
1995 (16th)	Blue Eagles ^{(6)}	Free Spirit		
Year	Open Class	A Class	Junior Class	Cadet Class
1996 (17th)	Blue Eagles ^{(7)}	Cadence	No competition	Squires
1997 (18th)	Senators ^{(2)}	Poynton Commodores ^{(1)}	Avenger	Black Knights
1998 (19th)	Sunrisers	6th Hove Scouts	North Star	6th Hove Scouts
1999 (20th)	Cadence ^{(3)}	Guardsmen	The Statesmen	Phoenix Guildford
2000 (21st)	Senators ^{(3)}	The Statesmen	Forgemen	37th Kingswood Cadets ^{(1)}
2001 (22nd)	Senators ^{(4)}	Forgemen	Ibstock Scouts	Concord
2002 (23rd)	Southern Aurora	Squires	Stafford Lancers	Aurora Cadets
2003 (24th)	Senators ^{(5)}	Phoenix Coventry ^{(1)}	Concord ^{(1)}	Encore
2004 (25th)	Senators ^{(6)}	Phoenix Coventry ^{(2)}	Senators	Black Knights Cadets
2005 (26th)	Senators ^{(7)}	Southern Aurora	Staffordshire Knights	37th Kingswood Cadets ^{(2)}
2006 (27th)	Black Knights	Concord ^{(2)}	Staffordshire Knights ^{(2)}	37th Kingswood Cadets ^{(3)}
Year	Intl. Open Class	National Open Class	National Junior Class	—
2007 (28th)	Kidsgrove Scouts ^{(1)}	Poynton Commodores ^{(2)}	Black Knights Cadets	
2008 (29th)	Senators ^{(8)}	Poynton Commodores ^{(3)}	Kidsgrove Scouts Juniors ^{(1)}	
Year	Open Class	A Class	Junior Class	—
2009 (30th)	Kidsgrove Scouts ^{(2)}	Staffordshire Knights	6th Hove Scouts B	
2010 (31st)	Kidsgrove Scouts ^{(3)}	Cheshire Cadets	Kidsgrove Scouts Juniors ^{(2)}	
2011 (32nd)	Kidsgrove Scouts ^{(4)}	Revolution Show Corps ^{(1)}	Kidsgrove Scouts Juniors ^{(3)}	
2012 (33rd)	Kidsgrove Scouts ^{(5)}	Beeches	Kidsgrove Scouts Juniors ^{(4)}	
2013 (34th)	The Company ^{(1)}	Revolution Show Corps ^{(2)}	Kidsgrove Scouts Juniors ^{(5)}	
2014 (35th)	Kidsgrove Scouts ^{(6)}	Liberty	Thurrock Marching Brass	
2015 (36th)	The Company ^{(2)}	The Pacemakers ^{(3)}	Concord AllStars ^{(2)}	
2016 (37th)	The Company ^{(3)}	No competition	Concord AllStars ^{(3)}	
2017 (38th)	The Company ^{(4)}	No competition	Concord AllStars ^{(4)}	
2018 (39th)	Kidsgrove Scouts ^{(7)}	The Pacemakers ^{(4)}	Concord AllStars ^{(5)}	
2019 (40th)	Kidsgrove Scouts ^{(8)}	The Pacemakers ^{(5)}	Thurrock Marching Brass ^{(2)}	
2020 (—)	In 2020 and 2021 no events took place due to COVID			
2021 (—)	In 2020 and 2021 no events took place due to COVID			
2022 (41st)	Beeches ^{(1)}	No competition	No competition	
2023 (42nd)	Beeches ^{(2)}	No competition	No competition	

== See also ==
- Drum Corps International
- Drum Corps Europe
