= Kamakura Women's University =

Private college in Japan

Coordinates: 35°21′7.5″N 139°32′16.2″E

- 鎌倉女子大学; Kamakura joshi daigaku
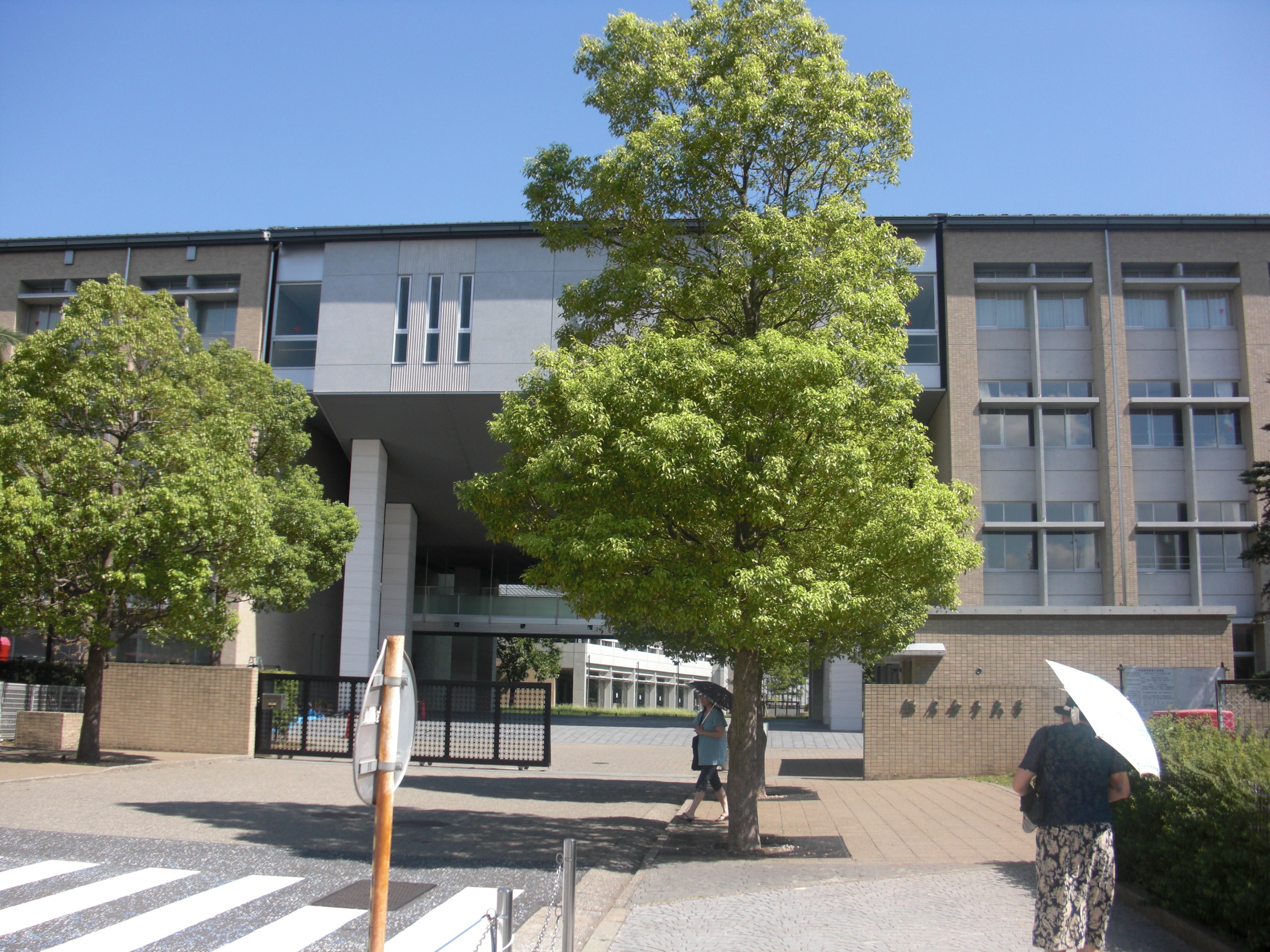
- Type: Private
- Established: 1943
- Undergraduates: 500
- Postgraduates: 10
- Location: Kamakura, Kanagawa, Japan
- Campus: Ofuna, Yamanouchi, Nikaido (all in Kamakura)
- Website: kamakura-u.ac.jp

Kamakura Women's University (鎌倉女子大学, Kamakura joshi daigaku) is a private women's college in Kamakura, Kanagawa Prefecture, Japan. The school specializes in home economics and child care.

== History ==
The Keihin Women's Housekeeping Science School was established in Kanagawa-ku, Yokohama in 1943 as a vocational school. It was relocated to the Iwase neighborhood of Kamakura in 1946. In 1950, it was chartered as the Keihin Women's University, and became the four-year Keihin Women's University in 1959. The present name was adopted in 1989.

== Curriculum ==
=== Undergraduate ===
- School of Home Economics
  - Department of Home Economics and Health Sciences
  - Department of Nutritional Management
- School of Child Studies
  - Department of Child Studies
  - Department of Child Psychology
- School of Education
  - Department of Education

=== Graduate ===
- School of Child Studies
  - Department of Child Studies
