= Drum Corps Europe =

Music competition governing body

- Location: Netherlands; United Kingdom; Ireland; Germany
- Founded: 2000; 26 years ago
- No. of corps: 13 (Premier & Junior Class)
- Chairman: Rob van Koningshoven
- First champions: West Coast Sound, 2001
- Current champions: 2023 Champions: Beeches (Premier Class); Jong Jubal (Junior Class); Brass and Drum Corps Kriftel (Concert Class)
- Website: dceurope.org

Drum Corps Europe (DCE) is a governing body for all-age drum and bugle corps based in Biddinghuizen, Netherlands. DCE coordinates the European Music Games, including the annual European Championships, in cooperation with strategic partners from the United Kingdom, Ireland, and Germany. DCE also hosts the Dutch Music Games which were previously hosted by the defunct Drum Corps Nederland (DCN). (Note: Often written as Drum Corps Netherland, or Netherlands, by English speaking fans.) Also known as European Drum Corps Association (EDCA).

The DCE European Championships have been hosted at Parkstad Limburg Stadion in Kerkrade since 2008. In January 2020, DCE announced it would not organize a Championship event in 2020 due to insufficient corps registrations. Several European drum corps associations, including Drum Corps United Kingdom, jointly announced a substitute championships tentatively scheduled for September 2020. The European Drum Corps Championship was hosted at Stadion Krommedijk in Dordrecht on 26 September 2022. The first European championship in two years.

DCE was reorganized in 2018 following a brief closure in 2017. The European Music Games (EMG) Judging Guide, utilized by other governing bodies within Europe, is developed and published by DCE's adjudicators.

== History ==
DCE was founded in 2000 with the goal of developing the drum corps activity in Europe. Founding members opted to codify as few rules of competition as possible as a means of encouraging growth. The first European Championships were hosted at the Arteveldestadion in Ghent, Belgium on 26 May 2001. West Coast Sound, from Haarlem, was crowned the inaugural European champion.

=== European Music Games ===
In 2006, DCE announced it would cooperate with other drum corps associations in Europe to develop a standardized adjudication manual and adjudicator training. The result was the creation of the European Music Games format in 2008.

==== Affiliates ====
- Dutch Music Games (DMG), formerly Drum Corps Nederland (DCN)
- Drum Corps United Kingdom (DCUK)
- Irish Marching Band Association (IMBA)
- Rasteder Musiktage (Rastede Music Days Festival), Rastede, Germany
- German Music Championships (GMC) Celle-Germany

=== Reorganization ===
Following the 2017 European Championships, DCE executives announced the immediate suspension of operations. Reasons given were dwindling personnel, and the fiscal pressure of hosting an international event. In December, a new association was established, the European Drum Corps Association (EDCA), with the intention of replacing DCE. On 23 January 2018, the EDCA received approval to continue operations as Drum Corps Europe.

Prior to the reorganization, DCE operated as a private foundation which limited the ability of participating drum corps to improve the adjudication and competitive attributes of sanctioned events. The new structure, as an association, is similar to other governing bodies in the activity, such as Drum Corps Associates (DCA) in the United States. Participating corps will have a "direct say" in governance and adjudication.

In January 2020, DCE announced it would not organize a European Championship due to insufficient corps registrations. Other European drum corps associations and presenting partners, including Drum Corps United Kingdom, jointly announced a substitute championship tentatively scheduled for September 2020. After a two year delay due to world events, the European Drum Corps Championship was hosted at Stadion Krommedijk in Dordrecht on 26 September 2022. The event was organized and presented by the Dutch Music Games. The championship included a new Concert Class, which is similar to DCA's Mini-corps Class.

== Classification and adjudication ==
Classes available at DCE sanctioned competitions are broadly defined, keeping with the founding ideology of "as few rules as possible". Competitions that utilize DCE's adjudication manual are often billed as "European Music Games" (EMG).

=== Classes ===
Premier Class corps are groups who compete at the national, or international, level. There is no age limit for this class.

A Class corps are groups with inexperienced participants. (Note: A Class is available almost exclusively at Dutch Music Games competitions.)

Junior Class corps are groups with young participants, and is limited to groups whose participants are no older than sixteen years of age.

Concert Class corps are groups who wish to compete in a concert setting, similar to DCA's mini-corps format. (Note: Concert Class is almost exclusively available at the Rasteder Musiktage or the German Open competitions.)

=== Adjudication ===
DCE's adjudication manual is based on three broad categories: Music, Visual and Effect. Each of the categories are further subdivided into reference criteria, or captions. All sanctioned competitions require nine adjudicators, including an adjudicator responsible for Timing & Penalties.

Category	Caption	+	Caption	+	Points
Music	Field Music (20) / 2	+	Ensemble Music (20) / 2	=	30.00
Music	Field Percussion (20) / 2	+	Ensemble Music (20) / 2	=	30.00
Visual	Field Visual (20) / 2	+	Ensemble Visual (20) / 2	=	30.00
Visual	Color Guard (20) / 2	+	Ensemble Visual (20) / 2	=	30.00
Effect	Music Effect (20)	+	Visual Effect (20)	=	40.00
			Subtotal		100.00
			Timing & Penalties		0.00
			Total		100.00

The adjudication manual in use by Drum Corps Associates (DCA) prior to 2001 was adapted for use by DCE. DCA's manual was also adapted for use by Drum Corps United Kingdom (DCUK) and Drum Corps Nederland (DCN) between 2001 and 2004. Each governing body made changes to better reflect the state of competition among their members corps. By 2006, the accumulated changes prevented corps from competing across the continent, as the reference criteria were no longer compatible, nor were the posted scores easily comparable.

In 2006, DCE developed a "European Music Games" adjudication manual, with input from other European judges associations. The name was inspired by Drum Corps International's "Summer Music Games" moniker. In 2010, DCA modified its adjudication manual removing the analysis captions, rendering it incompatible with the DCE manual.

== Past champions ==
DCE realigned its class system in 2001, 2007, and in 2022.

Year	Open Class	A Class	Cadet Class	Percussion
2001 (1st)	West Coast Sound (Netherlands)	No champion	Jong Axel (Netherlands)	Blue Lions (United Kingdom)
2002 (2nd)	West Coast Sound ^{(2)}	No champion	No champion	Blue Lions ^{(2)} (tie); Percussion Theater (Note: Percussion Theater won the 2002 Concert Percussion championship.) (Netherlands)
2003 (3rd)	Jubal (Netherlands)	Northern Star (United Kingdom)	Encore Cadets (United Kingdom)	Harpe Davids (Netherlands)
2004 (4th)	Beatrix (Netherlands)	Distant Thunder (United Kingdom) (tie); Strängnäs ^{(1)} (Sweden)	Jong Beatrix (Netherlands)	Rhythm Stars (Netherlands)
2005 (5th)	Beatrix ^{(2)}	Strängnäs ^{(2)}	Jong Beatrix ^{(2)}	DrumSpirit (Belgium)
2006 (6th)	Jubal ^{(2)}	No champion	Jong Jubal (Netherlands)	DrumSpirit ^{(2)}
2007 (7th)	Senators (United Kingdom)	No champion	Jong Jubal ^{(2)}	DrumSpirit ^{(3)}
Year	Premier Class	Junior Class	—	—
2008 (8th)	Senators ^{(2)}	Jong Jubal ^{(3)}		
2009 (9th)	Jubal ^{(3)}	Jong Jubal ^{(4)}		
2010 (10th)	Kidsgrove Scouts (United Kingdom)	Johan Friso (Netherlands)		
2011 (11th)	The Company (United Kingdom)	Johan Friso ^{(2)}		
2012 (13th)	The Company ^{(2)}	Jong Jubal ^{(5)}		
2013 (14th)	Jubal ^{(4)}	Jong Jubal ^{(6)}		
2014 (15th)	The Company ^{(3)}	Jong Jubal ^{(7)}		
2015 (16th)	Kidsgrove Scouts ^{(2)}	Johan Friso ^{(3)}		
2016 (17th)	The Company ^{(4)}	Jong Jubal ^{(8)}		
2017 (18th)	The Company ^{(5)}	Jong Jubal ^{(9)}		
2018 (19th)	Jubal ^{(5)}	Jong Jubal ^{(10)}		
2019 (20th)	Kidsgrove Scouts ^{(3)}	Jong Jubal ^{(11)}		
2020 (—)	No championships			
2021 (—)	No championships			
Year	Premier Class	Junior Class	Concert Class	Marching Percussion
2022 (21st)	Jubal ^{(6)}	Jong Jubal ^{(12)}	Spirit of 52 (Germany)	No champion
2023 (22nd)	Beeches ^{(1)} (United Kingdom)	Jong Jubal ^{(13)}	Brass and Drum Corps Kriftel (Germany)	Showband Explosion (Belgium)
2024 (23rd)	Beeches ^{(2)}	Jong Jubal ^{(14)}	Blue Bandits ^{(1)} (Germany)	No champion
Year	Premier Class	Junior Class	Concert Class	SoundSport Class
2025 (24th)	Blue Diamonds (Germany)	Jong Jubal ^{(15)}	Blue Bandits ^{(2)}	Beatrix' Hilversum (Netherlands)

== See also ==
- Drum Corps Associates
- Drum Corps International
- Winter Guard International
