= Front ensemble =

Stationary percussion section of a marching ensemble

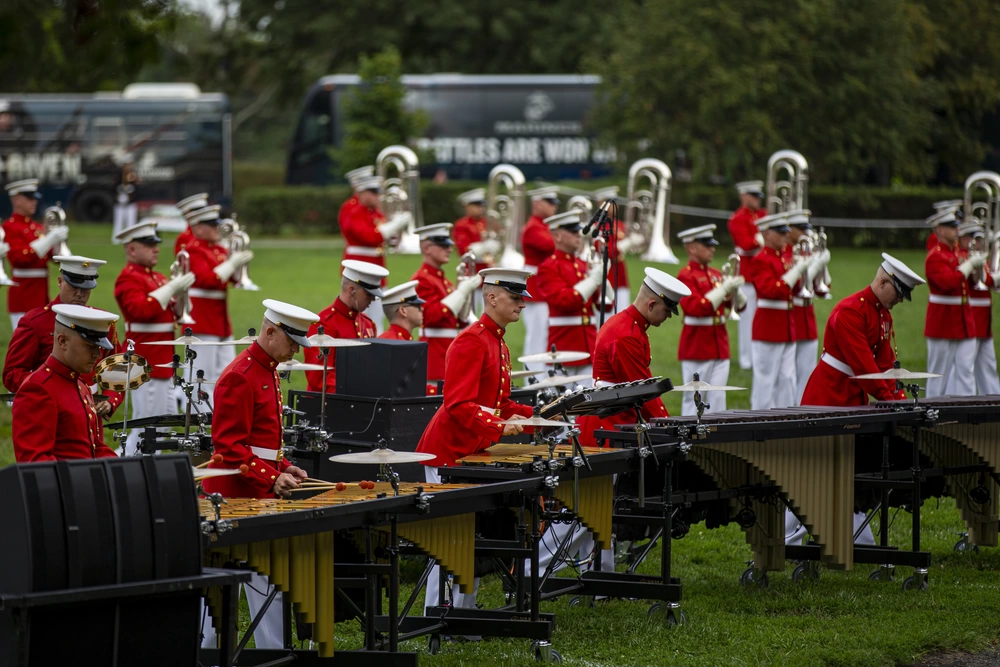
The front ensemble of the United States Marine Drum and Bugle Corps during the Sunset Parade

In a marching band, drum and bugle corps, or indoor percussion ensemble, the front ensemble or pit is the stationary percussion ensemble. This ensemble is typically placed in front of the football field, though some designers may use atypical layouts (such as having the front ensemble split into pods on the field). Some high school marching bands opt not to march any percussion instruments but instead have a "full" front ensemble.

Originally, the front ensemble consisted of keyboard percussion and timpani, the marching versions of which are heavy and awkward. Groups began adding more and more traditional percussion instruments to the pit, and in its modern form, the ensemble may contain any type of percussion instrument.

The main emphasis of the front ensemble are the mallet instruments: marimba, vibraphone, glockenspiel, chimes, crotales, and xylophone. Some marching band circuits also allow non-standard instruments (such as the violin) or electronic instruments (such as synthesizers and bass guitars) in the pit.

The term "pit" comes from musical theater, where the accompanying orchestra sits in the orchestra pit.

== History ==
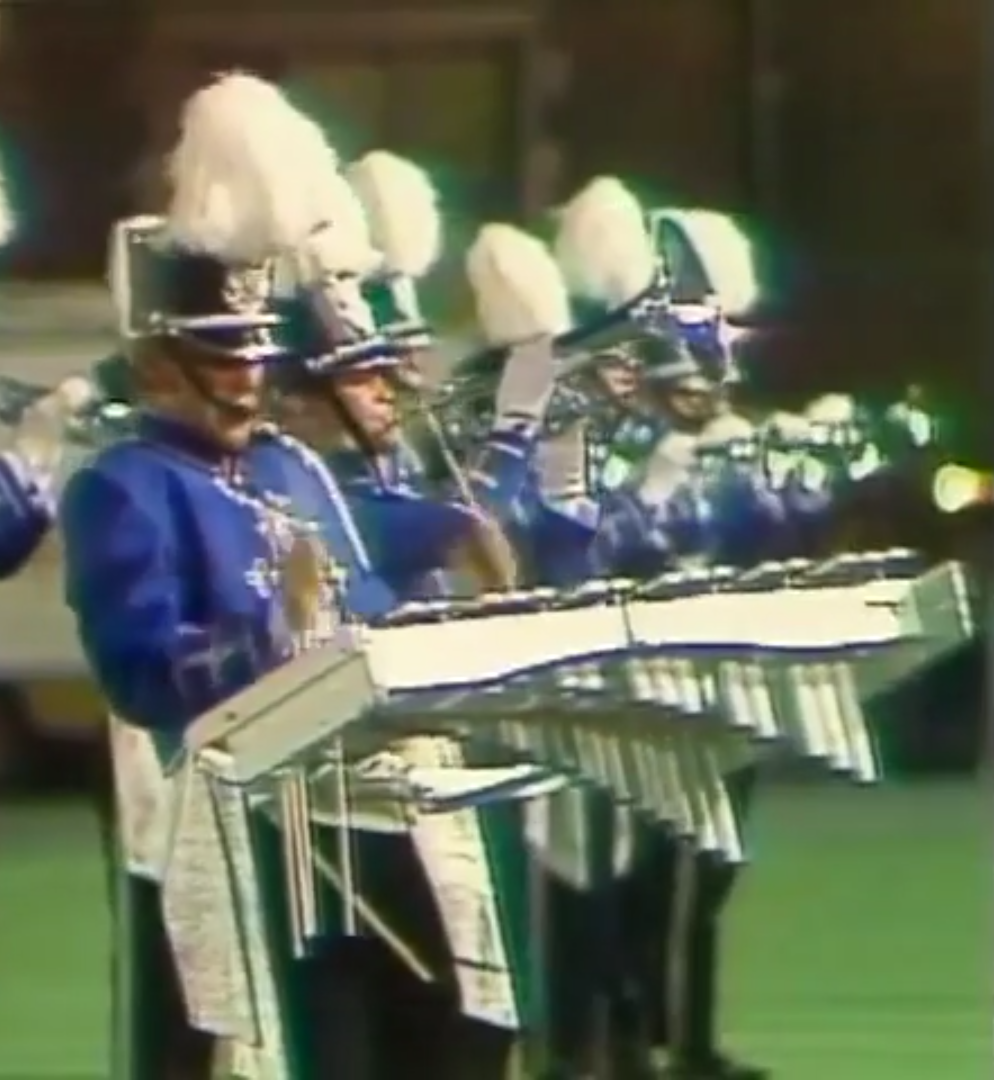
A set of marching alto bells used by the Blue Devils Drum and Bugle Corps in 1976

The front ensemble was developed by member corps of Drum Corps International before being adopted by other marching ensembles. Under the original rules Drum Corps International used with its founding in 1972, all instruments had to be marched without exception. Originally, timpani were the only pitched percussion instruments allowed to be marched. Later, keyboard percussion instruments were allowed to be marched: glockenspiels and xylophones were permitted in 1974, and marimbas and vibraphones were permitted in 1977.

Over time, people began to realize the physical strain of carrying these large, awkward instruments, and they were allowed to be placed on the ground in 1978. This allowed for the use of extended techniques (such as Stevens grip) and higher quality instruments (such as pedal timpani and extended range marimbas). The last year marching pitched percussion instruments were commonly used in competition was 1982.

The use of electronic instruments in marching band is controversial and divisive within the marching band community and was prohibited outright by Drum Corps International until 2008 when a proposal allowing them was passed.

== Instrumentation ==
Instrumentation for the front ensemble is not completely standardized, and not all ensembles have access to certain instruments; high schools may not have even one of each mallet instrument. The three main voices of the front ensemble are the wooden instruments (marimba and xylophone), the metallic instruments (vibraphone, glockenspiel, crotales, and tubular bells), and the auxiliary instruments (synthesizers, timpani, and non-pitched percussion).

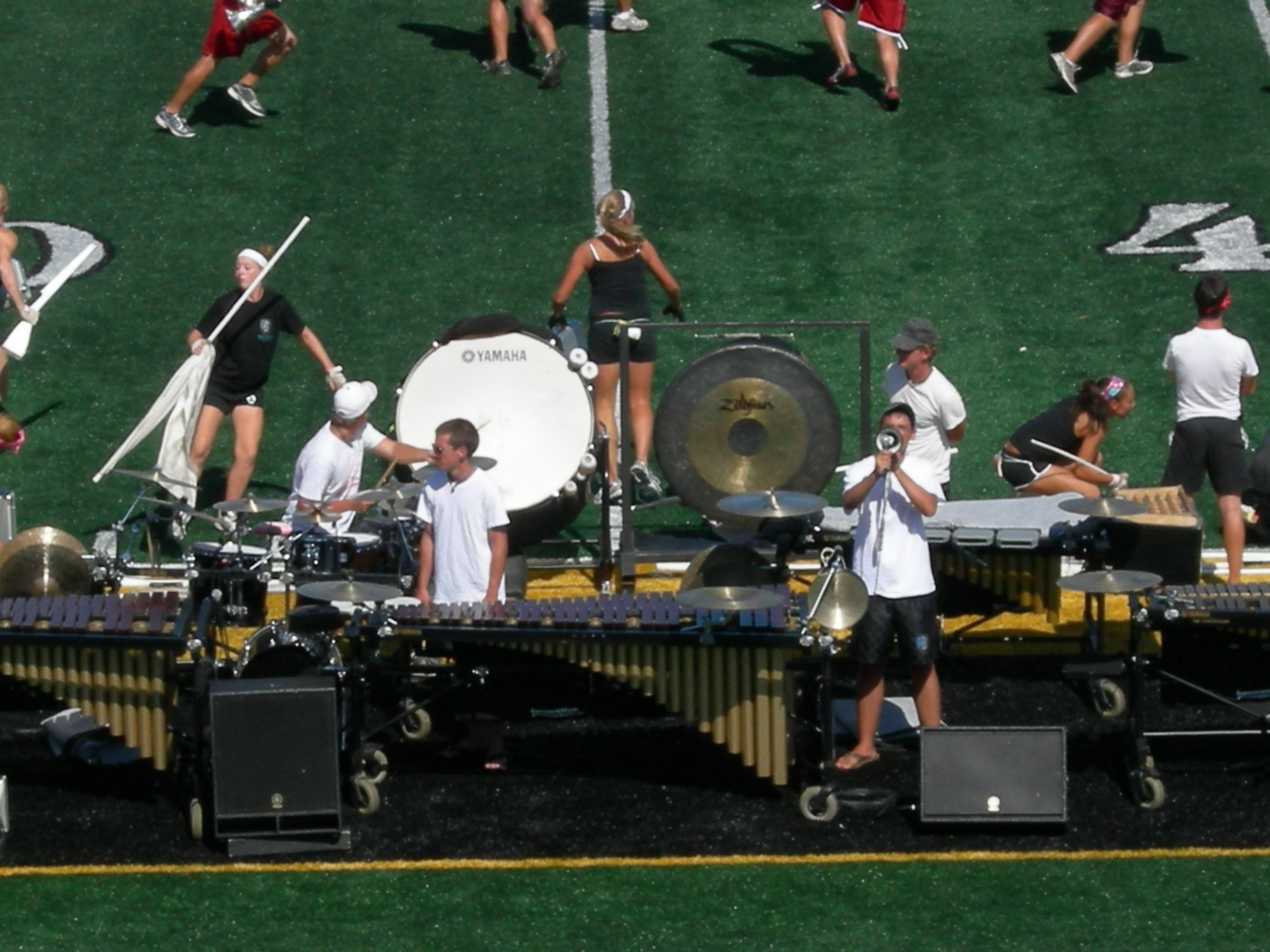
The front ensemble for the Bluecoats Drum and Bugle Corps rehearsing their 2007 show, "Criminal"

A typical front ensemble is made up of about 13–18 players:

=== Pitched Percussion ===
- 4–6 marimbas
- 4–6 vibraphones
- 1 glockenspiel
- 1 xylophone
- 1 set of timpani (4 or 5 drums)

=== Non-Pitched Percussion ===
- 0–1 drumset
- 0–2 racks (Note: Rack players are responsible for the auxiliary percussion within the ensemble. The unique name derives from the specialized frame that such instruments are mounted on.)

=== Electronic Instruments ===
- 1–2 synthesizers/samplers

== See also ==
- Marching percussion
- Technology in Drum Corps International
