= Marching percussion =

Percussion instruments in a drumline

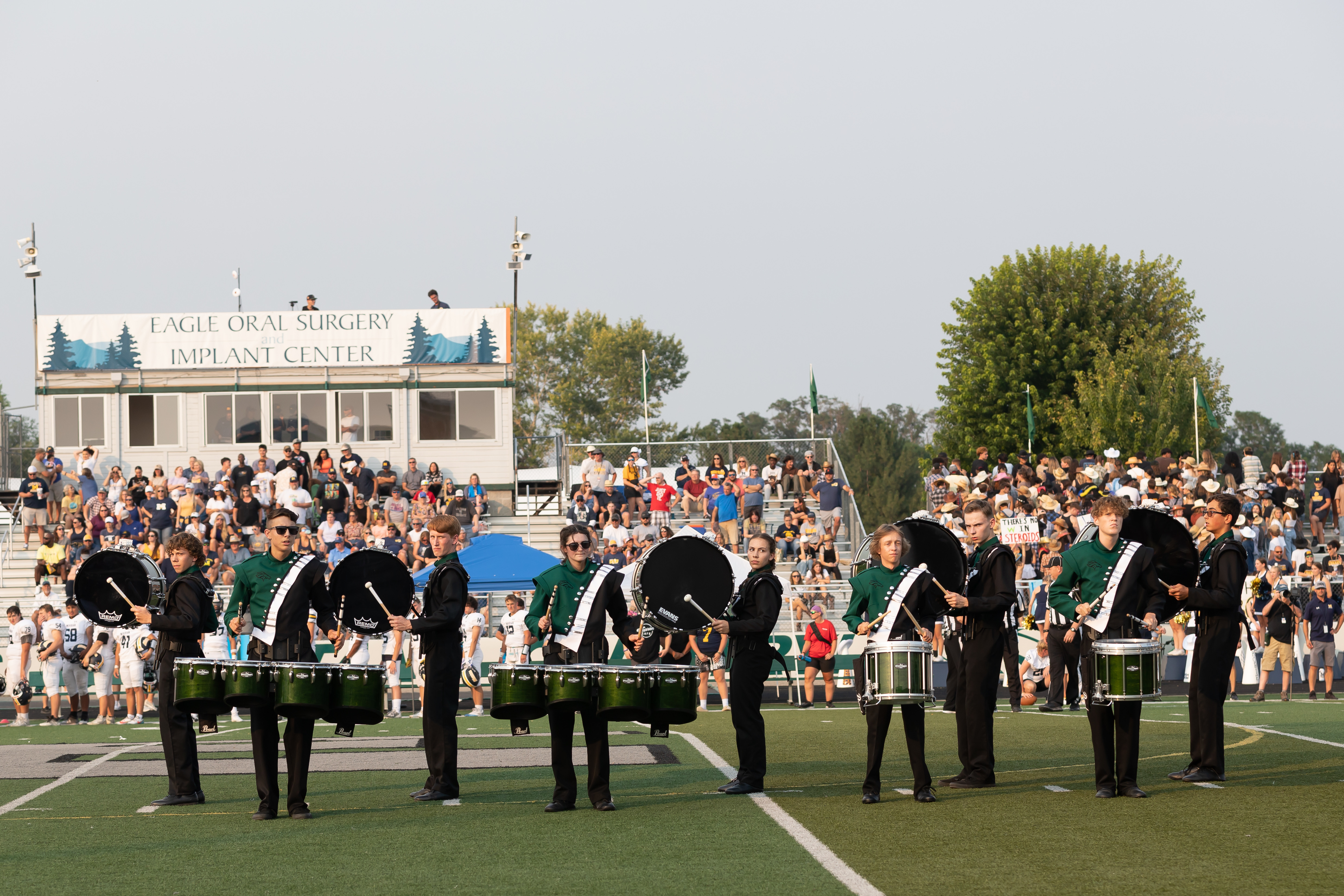
Eagle High School Drumline 2023

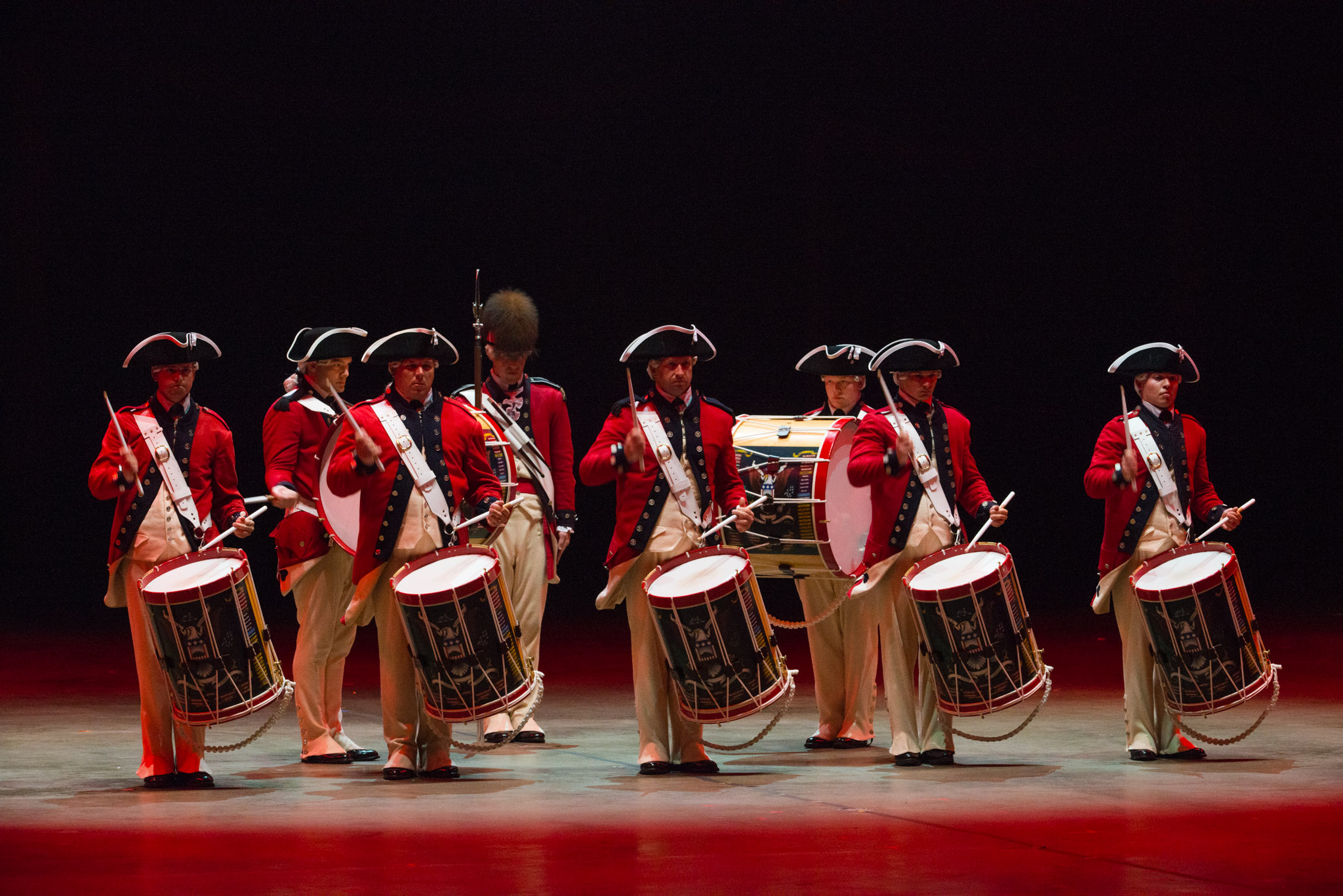
The United States Army Old Guard Fife and Drum Corps

Marching percussion instruments are percussion instruments (usually drums, such as snare, bass, and tenor drums) specially designed to be played while moving. This is achieved by attaching the drum(s) to a special harness (also called a carrier or rack) worn by the drummer, although not all marching bands use such harnesses and instead use traditional baldrics to sling their drums (the British Armed Forces, for instance, still use the old style of slung drums).

The drums are designed and tuned for maximum articulation and projection of sound, as marching activities are almost always outdoors or in large interior spaces. These instruments are used by marching bands, corps of drums, drum and bugle corps, fanfare bands, indoor percussion ensembles, and pipe bands. A marching percussion ensemble is frequently known as a "drumline" or "battery."

== Breakdown ==
Example of contemporary marching percussion
The drumline of the Cavaliers Drum and Bugle Corps performs a portion of their winning 2000 show

=== Drumline ===
A "drumline," also known as the "battery" or "batterie," is a section of percussion instruments usually played as part of a musical marching ensemble. A drumline can also be a section on their own competing against other drumlines. Marching bands, drum and bugle corps, and indoor percussion ensembles are some examples of groups that include a drumline.

The term "drumline" derives from the North American drum & bugle corps activity. In the 1940's 1950's, 60's and 70's, state and national drum & bugle corps championships were sponsored by two Veterans organizations, the American Legion and the VFW. Corps had to submit to Inspections. Inspection Judges would look for dirty or missing uniform parts, damaged equipment, loose threads, badly polished shoes, bad grooming and the like. National Championships were often lost because of infractions discovered by the Inspection Judge. The corps had to stand in line, by section, or in a single line during these Inspections. Thus there was a "horn line," a "flag line," and a "drum line." These terms are still common today in the drum corps activity.

Prior to the late 1970's marching bands had "drum sections" not drum lines (or drumlines). The "drum line" term began to be used by other marching percussion ensembles in the 70's along with the instrumentation used in the drum & bugle corps activity. This includes multi-tenor drums and pitched bass drums with split parts, embellishments like back-sticking and stick tosses, and innovations like mylar drumheads. All of these were developed in and originated in the North American drum & bugle corps activity.

The battery marches on the field in a group as opposed to the stationary front ensemble. The battery usually consists of snare drums, bass drums, tenor drums, and cymbals. In the past, marching timpani were common, as were marching keyboard percussion instruments such as glockenspiels and xylophones. However, due to the addition of the front ensemble, all pitched percussion instruments have since been grounded. A relatively small number of bands, mostly at the collegiate level, continue to field such traditional marching keyboard instruments; however, most bands have phased out their use.

==== Snare drums ====
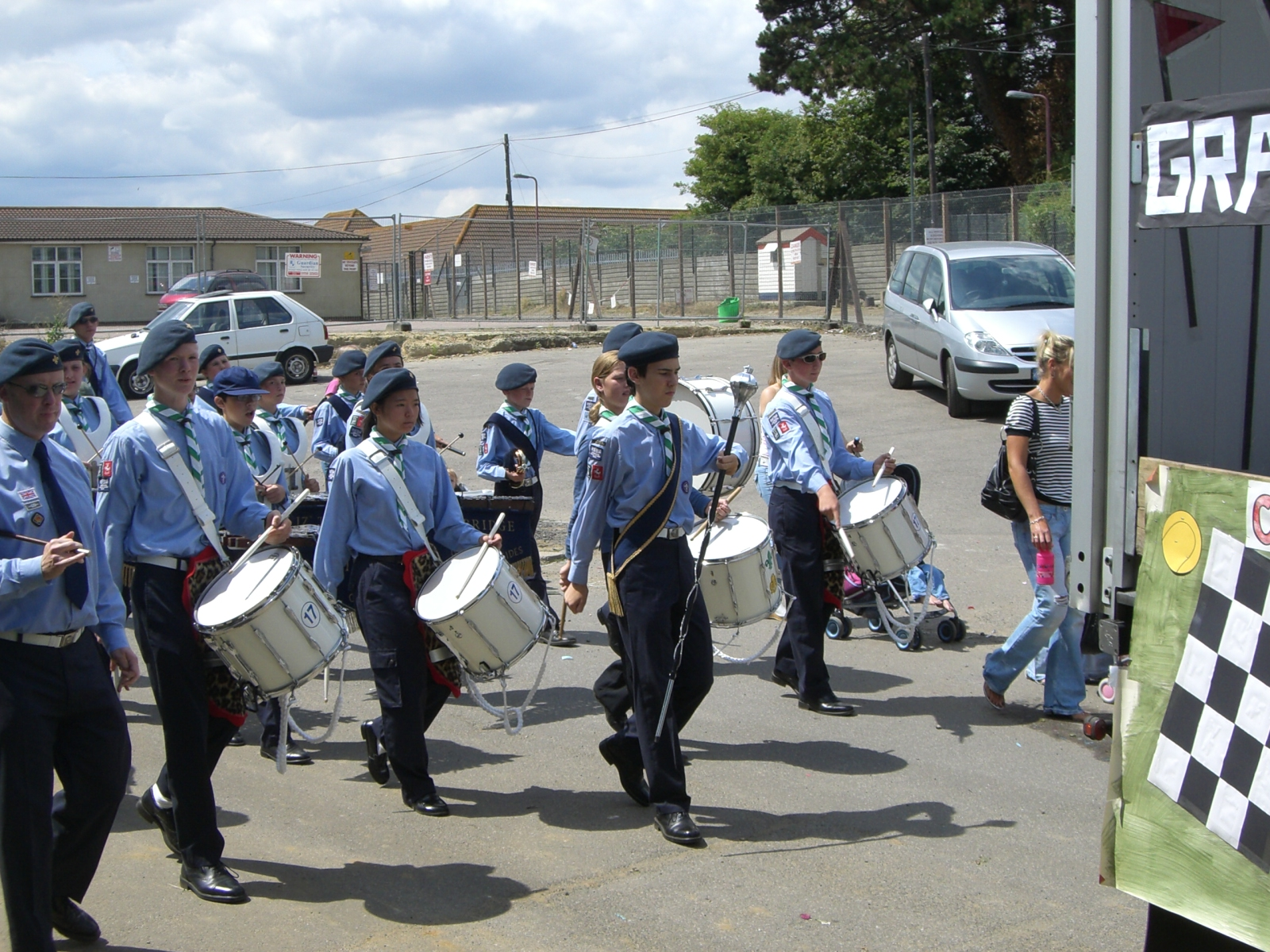
A drumline with sling-harness snares

In the past, snares were typically carried with slings. Slings caused the drums to tilt right causing discomfort in the left hand. Due to this discomfort, traditional grip was created.

Most modern snare drums have rigid over-the-shoulder harnesses that hold the drum with the playing surface parallel to the ground, which affords the option of performing with matched grip. Even with the option of performing matched grip, most competitive groups opt to use traditional grip. Traditional grip allows for more exciting visuals or tricks which are important in the competitive drumming world.

The center, or head, snare player (a position typically held by the most experienced snare drummer) is usually the ensemble's leader. When rehearsing or performing, the center snare may "tap off" the ensemble, setting the tempo with a solo rhythm.

Musically, the snare drum section typically has a rudimentarily challenging "book," or music. The instrument's role is that of the soprano line, typically carrying the main rhythm of the ensemble.

Marching snare drums are deeper in size than snares normally used for orchestral or drum kit purposes. This gives the drum the big, full sound necessary for outdoor use. Standard sizes (listed as diameter x depth) are 13x11 and 14x12 inches. Smaller sizes such as 13x9 have become increasingly popular in recent times with the proliferation of indoor drum lines.

Marching snare drums have high-tension heads made out of Kevlar or PET film. The modern "high tension" snare was developed in response to the higher head tensions made possible with the development of Kevlar and other high strength fibers bonded into the drumhead. High tension drums began and were perfected in the pipe band market and later moved into the marching band and drum corps areas. The bottom (or resonant) side of the drum has a tightly tuned head and synthetic gut or metal snare wires, which are often secured to the drum using a strainer to limit their movement and make the sound more staccato. For outdoor use, a projector or "scoop" - a piece of curved plastic - may be attached to the back of the bottom hoop to help project the sound forward to the audience.

Snare drums used in pipe bands are similar in construction to standard marching snare drums, with two key differences. First, the drum has an additional set of snares, directly under the batter (top) head. Second, the snares under the bottom head are made of coiled steel wires, similar to a drum set (as opposed to the synthetic "gut" snares on a corps-style drum). These differences tend to give the pipe drums a "snappier" snare sound, emphasizing the higher frequencies of the drum. Recently, corps-style drums have been produced with steel wire snares underneath the batter head (while remaining the gut snares under the bottom head). These snares are able to be switched on and off separate from the bottom snares, which allows units to use the second snares as a specific effect or as a permanent modification to the sound of the drum.

The head of the snare drum can also be varied to give the drum a different sound. Depending on the music or style that the drumline plays, different brands and types of heads may be used. For maximum volume and stick articulation, a head made of woven Kevlar fibers is used and usually tuned to very high tension. If the player desires a slightly "softer" feel, then an aramid fiber head may be used. Additionally, if more overtones and the softest head-feel are desired, the player may want to consider a heavy clear head with a center reinforcement dot. This type of head is rarely used today among competitive drumlines, mostly owing to its lack of outdoor projection in comparison with Kevlar, but nonetheless, it may still be used if a unique timbre is desired. One of the most famous marching bands utilizing this head is the Ohio State University Marching Band, however, recently, they have switched to the more modern high-tension Aramid-fiber heads.

==== Tenor/quad drums ====
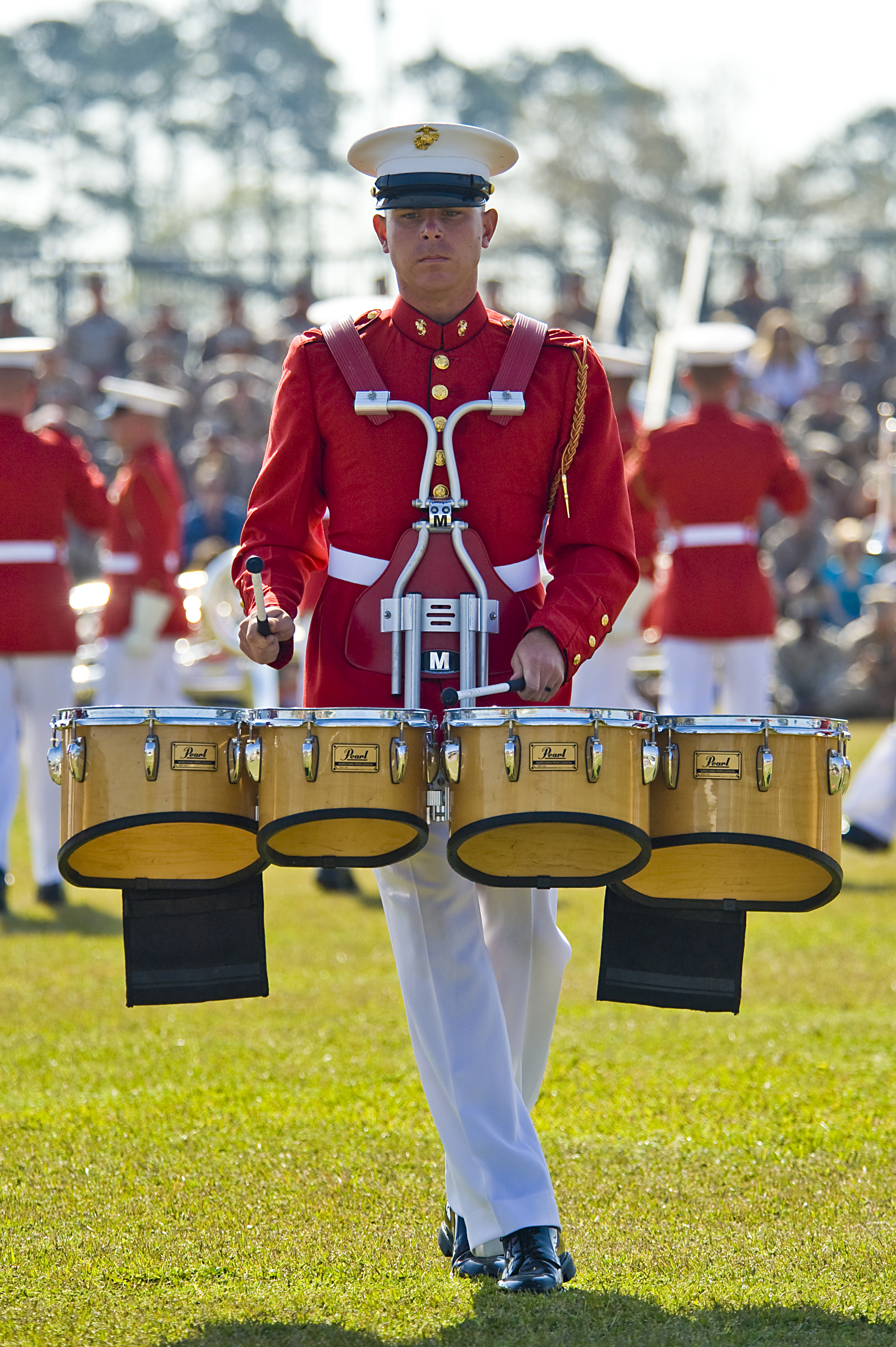
A tenor player with four drums

Marching tenor drums (also called quads/quints) are single-headed tonal drums. Modern tenor configurations usually have four drums and one to two special effect drums known as spocks. The spocks are tuned relatively high and are used to play a unique, high pitched sound that cuts through the ensemble while performing. Tenor players add pitch variety to the drumline with drums of different sizes.

Tenor players use matched grip and generally play with mallets with plastic disc-shaped heads, though traditional drumsticks and softer mallets are commonly used to achieve different timbres.

Single tenor drums, also known as flubs, are popular in HBCUs, pipe bands or as starting points for inexperienced drummers and are beaten using soft or hard mallets. Either in the single or the multiple form, these tenors can be mounted on the chest, like bass drums, or horizontally, like traditional snares.

Tenor drums are aptly the tenor voice of the ensemble, as well as one of the most melodic. Tenor drums often have parts that mirror what the winds or front ensemble is playing. Because there is often more than one drum, various visuals can be used when performing drum changes such as "crossovers" or "sweeps".

Marching multiple tenor drums can weigh anywhere between 30 and 72 pounds, depending not only on the model & brand, but also the position they are carried in, and number of drums. This means they are typically the heaviest drums in the drumline.

Modern marching bands and drum corps use multi-tenors, which consist of several single-headed tom-toms played by a single drummer. The bottoms of the shells are open and beveled to project the sound of the drum forward. Double-ply PET film heads are typically used for increased sound projection and durability. They are typically played with wooden- or aluminum-shafted mallets that have disc-shaped heads made of nylon. Mallets with felt or fleece heads, drumsticks, drum brushes, and other implements are occasionally used to achieve different timbres. The playing technique used for multi-tenors is somewhat different from that of a snare drum, and more like that of a timpani because the drumhead is struck closer to the edge instead of in the center. This creates a sound with more overtones, as opposed to striking the drumhead in the center, which produces a very short, dull sound with few overtones that is considered undesirable for multi-tenors.

A full-size set of tenors consists of 10, 12, 13, and 14-inch (360 mm) toms arranged in an arc, often with an additional one or two smaller (6 or 8-inch) toms called "gock," "shot," or "spock" drums inside of the arc. Because a full-sized set of tenors with a carrier can exceed 55 pounds smaller and lighter versions of tenors outfitted with 8, 10, 12, and 13-inch (330 mm) toms are often used by lines with smaller or younger players. All multi-tenors based on the four-drum configuration are called quads despite the fact that there may be a total of five or six drums counting the gock drums. Sets with one gock drum are called quints, and sets with two gock drums are called sextets, "squints," hexes, or sixpacks. To produce different sounds between spock drums with the same diameter, the head type, shell depth, and/or tuning between the two drums may vary. A common name for all multi-tenors is simply, "Tenors." Tenor drums have often been compared to the Latin percussion timbales, as many musicians, including Tito Puente use a setup similar to modern marching tenors.

Lines of as few as 1 or 2 tenor drummers are common in high schools and junior high schools. Some schools don't have tenors. Many large college marching bands have 5 or more. Most drum corps consider 4 or 5 tenors to be optimal.

The modern multi-tenors evolved from horizontally mounted dual single-headed bass drums first used by the Boston Crusaders Drum and Bugle Corps in the late 1960s. Early multi-tenors had shells with a flat bottom. These drums sounded a lot like timpani, so they were called timp-toms. As drum sizes got smaller, more drums began to be added to multi-tenor configurations. The largest sets of multi-tenors had 7 drums and were carried by both the 1977 and 1992 Spirit of Atlanta Drum and Bugle Corps tenor lines.

Scottish pipe bands use a single tenor drum as part of their drum corps section. Traditional marching bands and drum corps may also use single tenors, which are double-headed drums much like snare drums but without snares, and only use either mallets (one or two, the former used in Spain and Italy and the latter in the UK and Commonwealth, Germany, Belgium, and the Netherlands) or sticks (the latter in marching bands in France). The Scottish form tenors are played with bigger mallets, while regular single tenors have small mallets, all are covered with felt or cotton. Such drums are used either with the sling mount or shoulder mount. Some show bands such as those at historically black colleges and universities use both single tenors and multi-tenors.

==== Bass drums ====
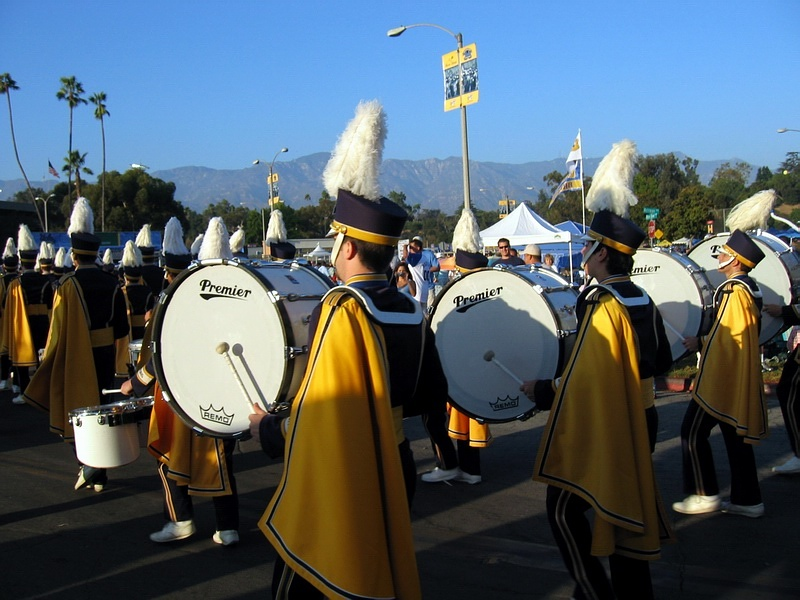
The bass line of the UCLA Bruin Marching Band

Bass drums used by modern ensembles come in a variety of sizes, with a 14 inch "universal" depth, and diameter measured in 2 inch increments from 14 to 32 inches. The heads of these drums are usually made of a smooth white PET film, which gives a tonality that is midway between clear and coated heads. Unlike tenors and snares, bass drums are mounted so that the cylindrical shell of the drum is mounted on the player's harness and the two drum heads of the drum face out sideways. The player can then play on both heads, one arm for a drum head on either side. Each drummer plays and carries one drum, and a line is created by having several people carry different-sized drums. Such drums are called tonal bass drums. The Cavaliers Drum and Bugle Corps were the first marching unit to use and standardize tonal bass drum tuning. Many groups try to use the largest size bass drum that is comfortable for the physically largest bass drummer to carry as the bottom bass drum, as larger people are generally better able to carry a bigger drum for many hours.

In corps-style bands, each bass drummer only plays one segment of the entire bass drum part, unlike the snares and tenors. This is known as a split part. A unison refers to when all or some bass drummers play together at the same time. Lines can vary in size from as few as 2 players in small high schools to as many as 9 in very large college marching bands. A line of 5 (with individual drum sizes ranging from 18 to 32-inches) is the most common in a drum corps. Some traditional groups, such as some show-style marching bands from historically black colleges and universities continue to use a non-tonal bass drums, where each drum is roughly the same size and each drummer plays the same part.

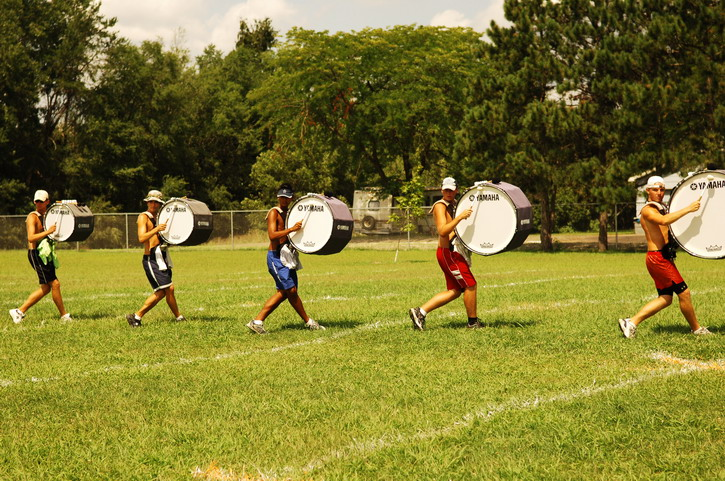
The Cavaliers' bass line in 2006 showing five tonal bass drums

Pipe bands and some traditional groups use a single bass drummer, who typically carries the pulse of the group. The bass drums used by pipe bands have seen an increase in size and more of a focus on tone in recent times. Typical sizes range from 12 to 18-inches deep by 28 inches in diameter. The goal is to produce a subtle deep tone which is usually in tune with the drones of the bagpipe. Various muffling techniques (sometimes referred to as "treatments") can be used on bass drums to achieve a desired sound. The most common of these involve applying foam weatherstripping, either on the head directly or on the shell of the drum. Some drumhead manufacturers make heads that are "pre-muffled." These heads usually have separate pieces of PET film or other material which are set into the head's flesh hoop and touch the head to control overtones.

Drumlines most frequently use pitched bass drums as tonal drums split between several percussionists. Marching bass drums, which produce the deepest sound in the battery, are larger drums carried on harnesses or straps with the heads facing to the left and right of the player. The musicians carrying the bass drums typically line up in drum size order, but will also assume various positions for the purposes of drill. Bass drummers use mallets with rounded or cylindrical heads often made of hard felt. High school, Colleges, and drum corps drumlines typically consist of four to six different bass drum sizes to ensure enough for a melody. Sometimes, in smaller bands, one may see only two or three bass drummers perform. A bass drum can weigh anywhere between 15 pounds and 40 pounds, depending on the model and size. Each drummer plays a unique part, though the entire bass drum part is conceived as a whole. This allows for a melodic passage to be carried throughout the bass drumline, having runs of notes that flow up or down the drums and in pitch. In addition to these "split" parts, bass drummers will also have unison notes, where everyone plays at the same time. In addition to splits and unison hits, sometimes the basses will play a rim click, in which they will hit a metal bar attached to the rim of the drum. This is mainly used for subdividing rhythms, and are mainly used when the snares play one or more rim shots and the basses have a unison note on the offbeat.

==== Cymbals ====
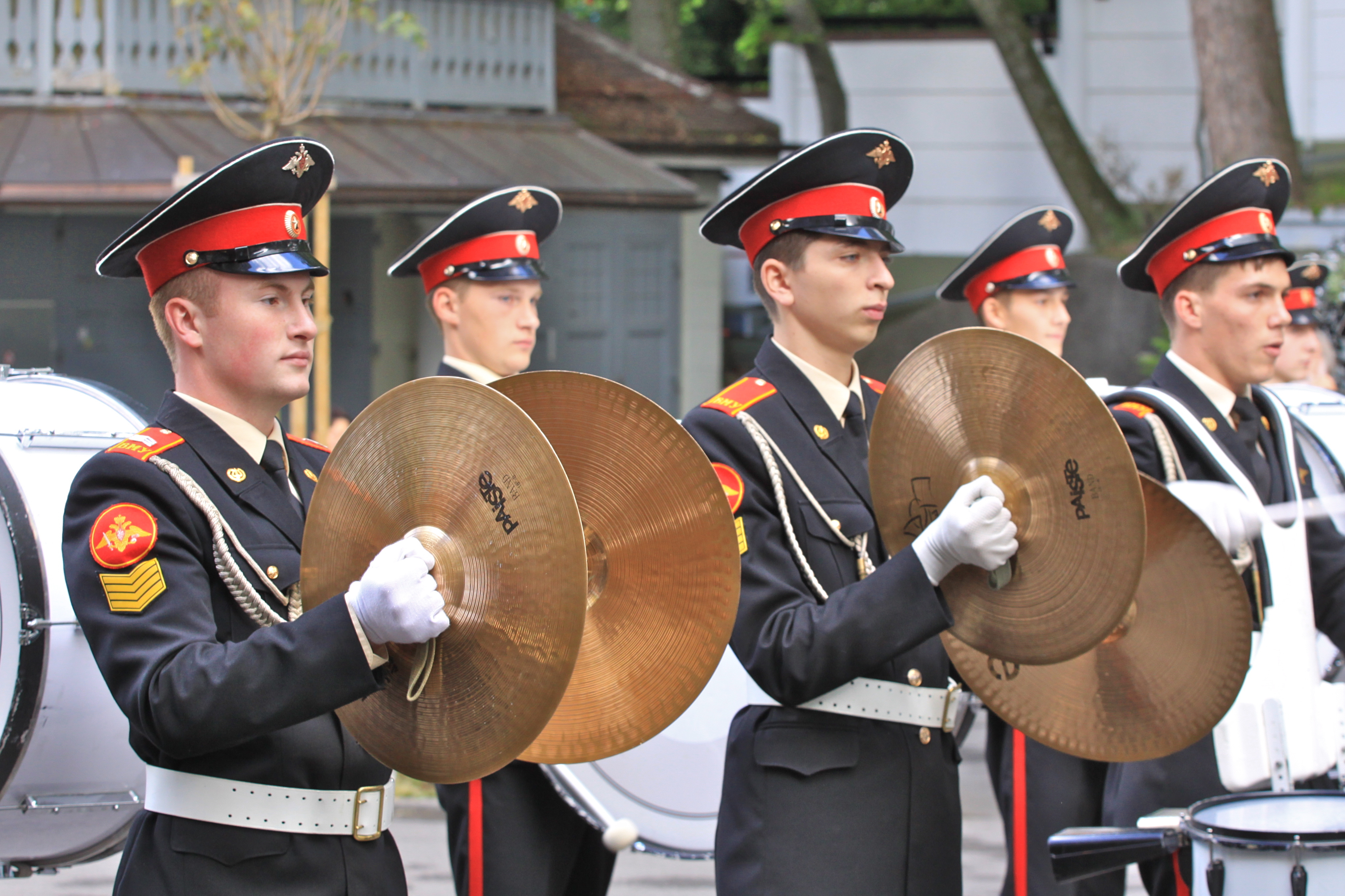
Several cymbalists from a military band

Marching cymbals are typically pairs of clash cymbals usually around 18 to 20-inches in diameter. Cymbals larger than 20-inches are usually too heavy to be marched comfortably and cymbals smaller than 18-inches lack the sonic capabilities to project from the field to the stands. Oftentimes, each player in a cymbal line will have a different sized pair of cymbals than their peers because to carry out different sounds and tones depending on what the music or percussion director calls for.

Cymbals are typically not played in the same manner as orchestral crash cymbals. Marching cymbalists use a special type of grip known as the "Garfield grip" (named after its use by the Garfield Cadets Drum and Bugle Corps) where the hand goes through the leather strap and twists, causing the hand to be flat against the bell of the cymbal. This allows for greater control over the cymbals and for the cymbalists to perform visual effects – movements such as twirls and flips that are eye-pleasing.

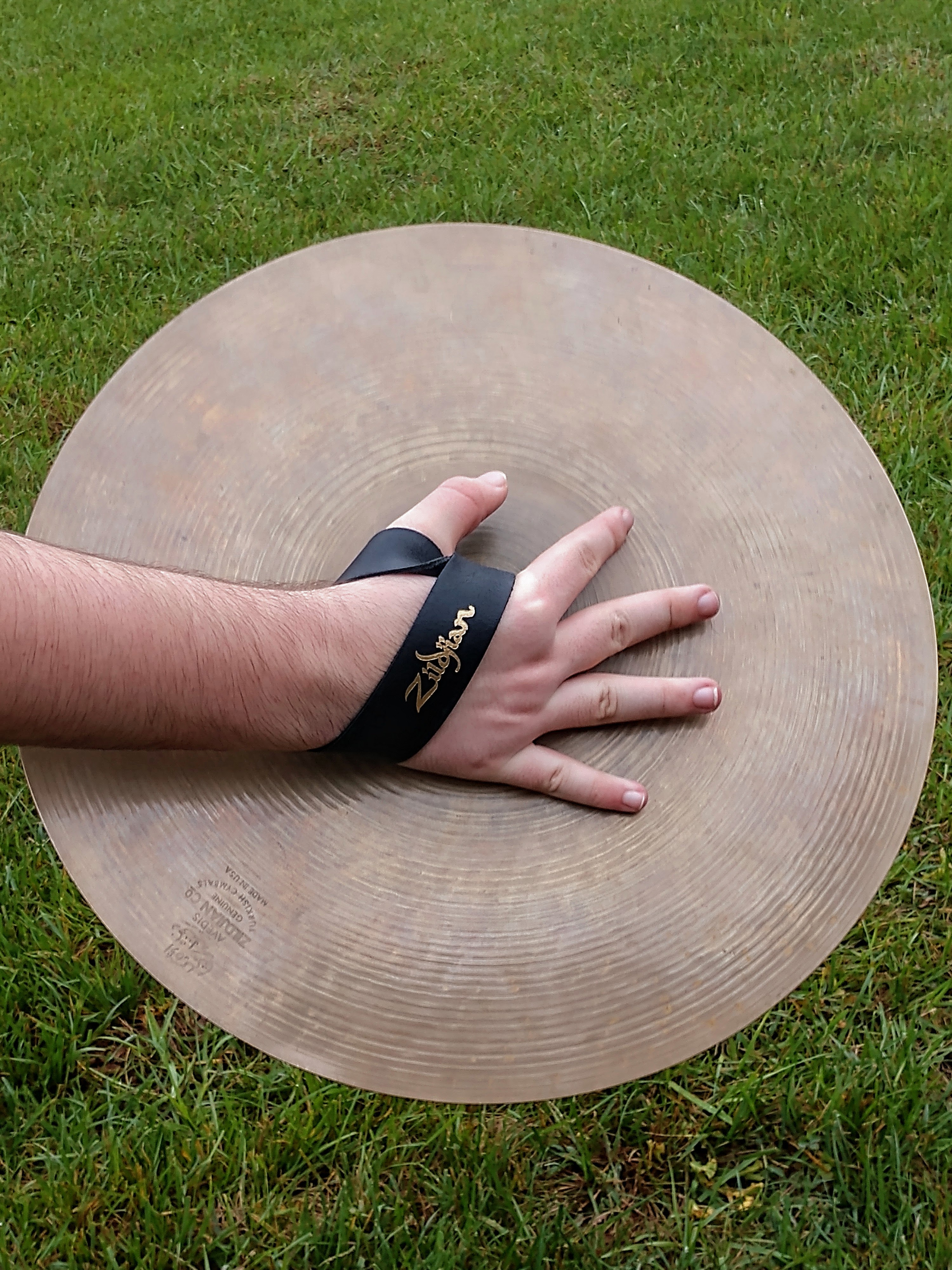
An example of Garfield grip

Among the differences between marching and orchestral cymbal are the many types of specialty crashes and effects. Crash-chokes are played beginning with a normal crash but pulled into the body at the shoulders or stomach as to effectively stop the sound after attaining the desired crash. Slides, or sizzle-sucks, are played using the right cymbal to drive into the left, where the outer edge hits half-way between the bell and the edge of the left cymbal. After the right cymbal slides up on the left, it is brought back straight into the body. The cymbal is stopped by catching the air pocket inside of the cymbals. The cymbals maintain contact at all times. The desired sound is a "sizzle then choke" effect.

Cymbal parts are often split in the same manner as bass drum parts – each cymbalist plays one component of a larger part. Snare drummers may play on the cymbals as ride cymbals or like hi-hats.

Many contemporary field ensembles do not utilize a cymbal line, instead having cymbals played within the front ensemble. In indoor percussion ensembles, the trend seems to be towards keeping or expanding cymbal sections.

==== Mallet percussion ====
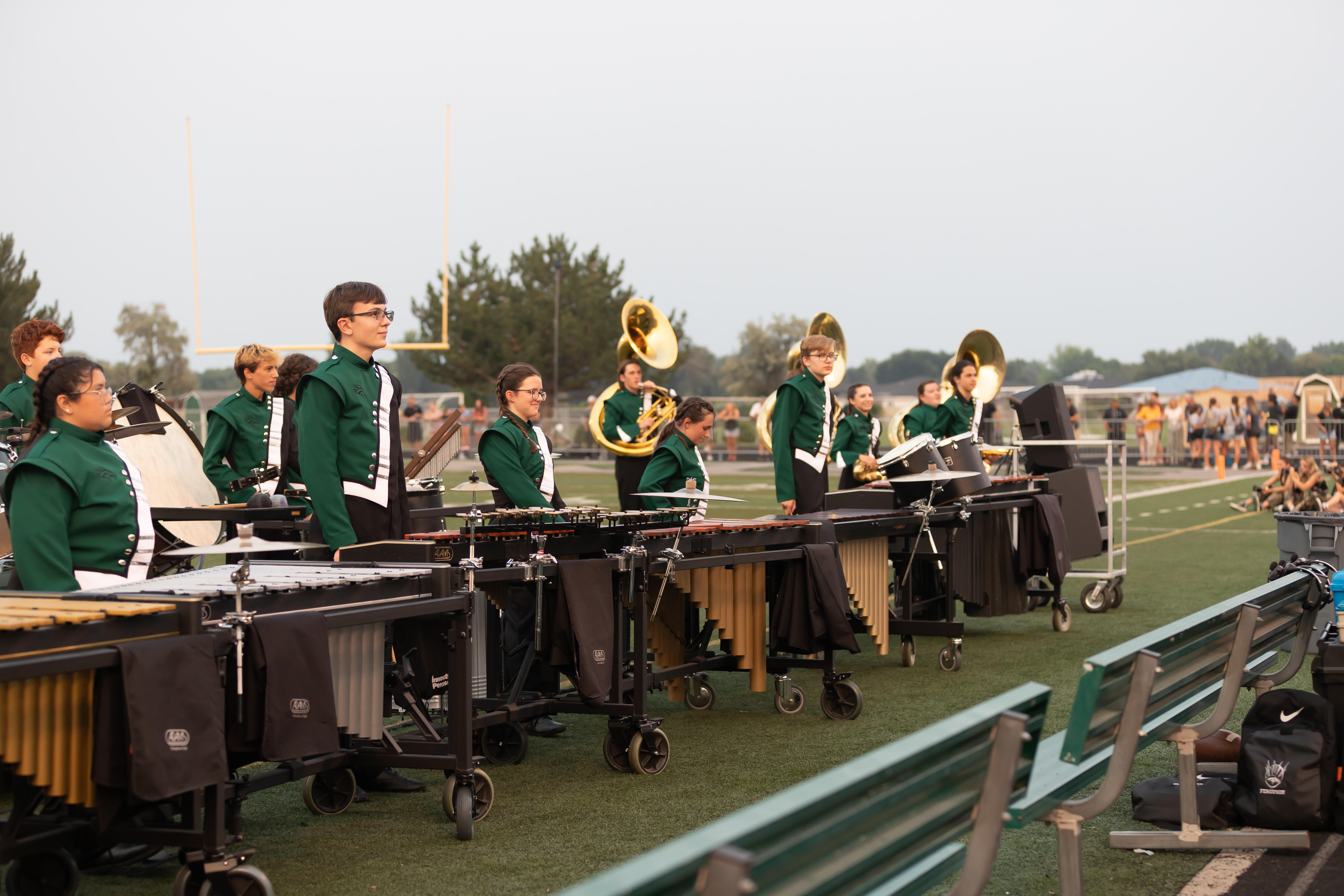
An example of a high school front ensemble

The glockenspiel is the mallet percussion instrument most often used as a part of the battery. The tradition of marching the glockenspiel as part of the battery is common in many countries, such as in the Filipino drum and lyre corps. In the early 1970s, mallet percussion was first allowed into drum corps in competitive circuits, such as Drum Corps International. At first, only glockenspiels and xylophones were allowed, but starting in 1976 marimbas and vibraphones were also allowed. The 27th Lancers Drum and Bugle Corps even rigged up homemade racks to march tubular bells.

Eventually, in 1981, within North American bands and corps, mallet instruments were allowed to be grounded, as arrangers felt limited by the instruments they were able to write for, and marching the heavy equipment became detrimental to the members' health. Since then, most corps or bands have kept their mallet instruments in the front as part of the front ensemble. (Other countries, however, have kept the practice of marching the glockenspiel while adopting the front ensemble tradition.)

==== Timpani ====
Like the marching mallet percussion, timpani were marched when drum corps required everything to be marched. The marching timpani were made of fiberglass, and were played by a four- or five-man line (similar to a modern-day bass drum line). The timpani were cranked by a handle sticking up on the side of the drum. Sometimes intricate, complex music was made using the possibilities of 4 or 5 players. While one man was cranking/tuning, another was playing. To help with intonation issues, some timpani came equipped with tuning gauges.

During concert pieces, timpani were often grounded momentarily, using a tripod leg system. Eventually, in 1981, like the mallet instruments, timpani were allowed to be grounded paving the way to the modern-day front ensemble. Some corps, like the Blue Devils Drum and Bugle Corps, started using balanced action timpani played by only one player to open up new positions for other members. However, not all corps could afford a new set of concert timpani and simply grounded their marching timpani.

==== Turkish crescents ====
In several countries, there exists a Turkish-derived tradition of carrying a Turkish crescent as part of the percussion section of bands or field music, by itself having Central Asian origins. It arrived in Europe as part of the trend of adopting Turkish musical forms in the 18th century, when Turkish musicians from various Ottoman military bands in the Ottoman Empire, majority of them Janissaries, were employed to form part of a growing number of military bands, introducing this instrument to the West together with the cymbals and bass drum. By the 19th century, it had been adopted as part of the percussion battery of military marching bands in a number of countries.

Its heyday in Europe was from the mid-18th to mid-19th century, when it was commonly played often by elaborately dressed black Africans in a number of countries (like France and the United Kingdom), who made all manner of contortions while playing the instrument in the battery section. Some of these gestures survive today, in the stick twirling by bass and tenor drummers. An aspect of the elaborate costumes survives in the leopard skin apron worn by bass drummers in British military bands; however the use of the "Jingling Johnny" was discontinued in the British Army in 1837. By the 19th up to the early 20th century, Turkish crescents were used in processions honoring important dignitaries as part of the band percussion section or in front of the leading ranks. They were skillfully twirled by dignified performers, much as batons are handled today by drum majors. This aspect survives today in the use of Turkish crescents as mostly symbolic objects in military marching bands. Today, Germany, France, the Netherlands, Sweden, Russia, Belarus, Ukraine, Azerbaijan, Chile, Brazil, Peru, and Bolivia, among others, still preserve the use of the instrument, albeit in the ceremonial form, but not playable, as part of the percussion unit or at the head of the band and/or field music ensemble. It is still a valuable part of the Ottoman bands that still use it to this day in Turkey, where they form part of the percussion unit.

The instrument is held vertically and when played is either shaken up and down or twisted. Sometimes there is a geared crank mechanism for rotating it. Most often, the bearer of the instrument holds the pole or the bottom part carefully in order to ensure great care in using the instrument, as seen in a number of bands and field music in several countries, as the instrument is secured on a strap similar to those of British side drums.

== Stick heights ==
=== Snares and tenors ===
Marching bands in general and especially marching drum lines emphasize uniformity. To achieve absolute uniformity, every member of the drumline must play with proper stick heights. A stick height is an approximate measurement of how high the bead of the stick comes off the drum head on any given note. Regularly used heights range from 3" to 12", with 1" and 15" being used mostly for visual effect. Snares and tenors can use this chart to establish guidelines for stick heights, but techniques and specifications may vary between lines and can be changed depending on what the music calls for. While those sticks or mallets used in multiple tenors follow those of mallet percussion, traditional drumsticks of the same height, as well as soft wrapped mallets made of yarn or felt, are used, while the latter are useful for those playing the single tenor, but there are differences, with small coverings for the usual marching single tenor and large ones for the Scottish form.

=== Bass drums ===
Bass drums do not use the same guidelines as snares and tenors. They are grouped in a different section of the battery. Below are the guidelines for bass drum heights. Again, techniques and specifications vary between drumlines. (All fractions are based on the Forte / perpendicular height. Establish this height first and then work the others around it.) It is advised for a player to commence in “set” position with the mallets about 1 inch away from the head.

Stick heights are not only important for visual reasons but they also strongly affect the sound quality. To get a uniform and consistent sound, one must play with even stick heights on the right and left hand. To practice playing with accurate stick or mallet heights, it is advisable to set up a drum or pad in front of a mirror. Start with a simple exercise and watch to see if the left heights are even with the right heights. If the player has access to a video camera, it can be personally recorded for later viewing. It is easier to watch one's mallet or stick heights and critique one's performance when not being focusing on playing.

== Harnesses ==
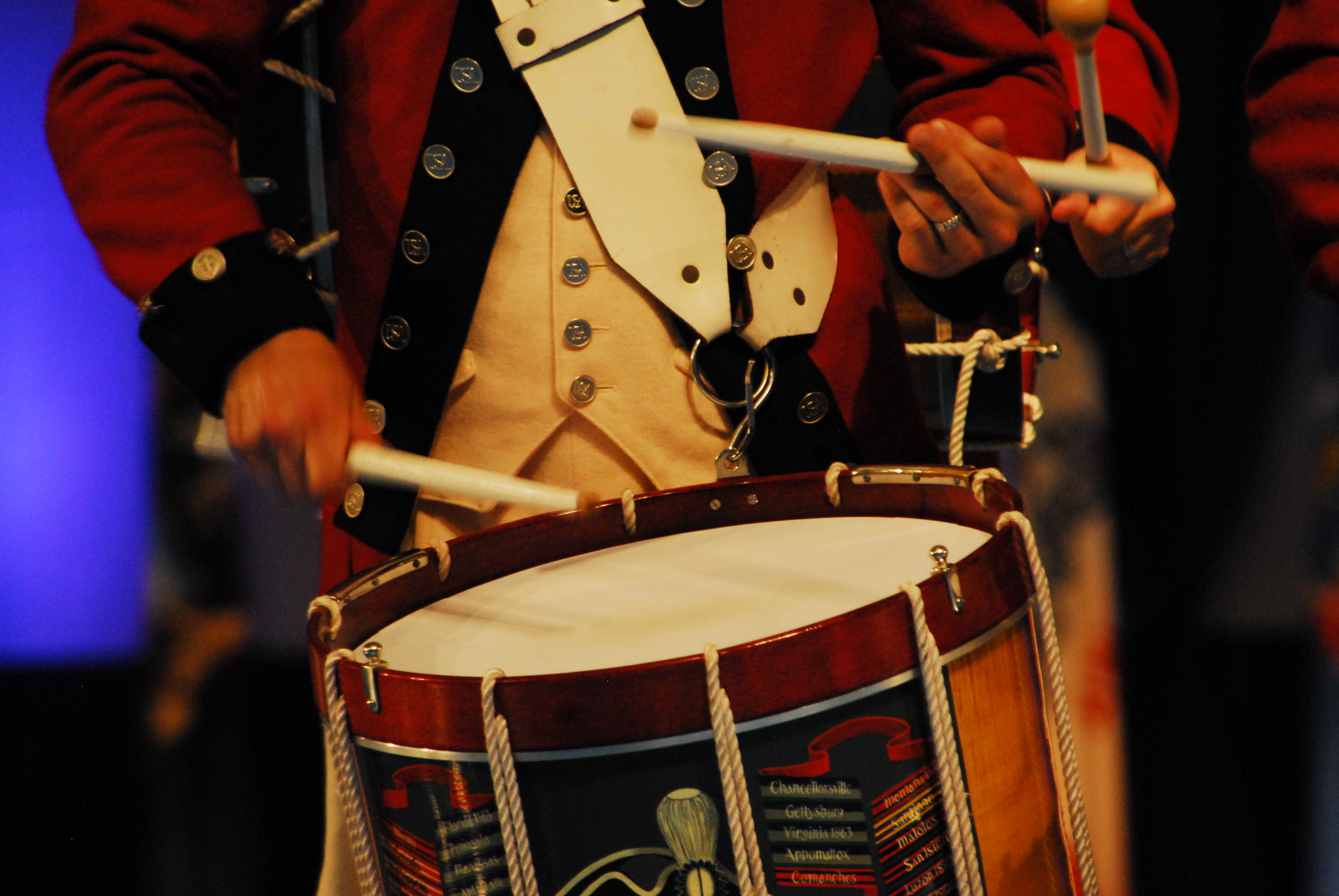
A drummer of the Old Guard Fife and Drum Corps with a Snare Drum

The original harnesses for the marching glockenspiel and xylophone were made of straps, which sometimes interfered with playing on the high end of the instrument or interfered with four-mallet playing. There were poles on the high and low ends of the keyboards sticking up a few inches, with straps going around the player's neck, making them look similar to a peanut vendor. Eventually, before the use of marching marimbas and vibraphones, a new style of harness was made. The new harness was a vest, similar to what is usually used today for marching percussion.

Harnesses for the timpani were originally just slings. Corps usually used 2 snare slings and hook them around the player, and onto his timpani. Some corps rigged wooden blocks between the drum and the player, to help balance issues, as the drums were carried high on the body. Some corps used harnesses for a few years, while some continued using slings.

== See also ==
- Military drum
- Front ensemble
