= Tenor drum =

Type of musical instrument

A tenor drum is a membranophone without a snare. There are several types of tenor drums.

== Early music ==
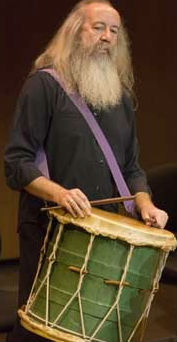
Early music tenor drum player

Early music tenor drums, or long drums, are cylindrical membranophones without snare used in Medieval, Renaissance and Baroque music. They consist of a cylinder of wood, covered with skin heads on both ends, that are tensioned by ropes. Played with two sticks, this type of drum varies in pitch, according to its size.

== Orchestral music ==
In a symphony orchestra's percussion section, a tenor drum is a low-pitched drum, similar in size to a field snare, but without snares and played with soft mallets or hard sticks. It is larger in diameter than depth, and tonally is midway between the bass drum and an unsnared snare drum. Berlioz scored for 2 tenor drums in the "Grande messe des morts". His "Te Deum" requires 6 tenor drums. Wagner wrote for this drum in "Rienzi", "Lohengrin", "Die Walküre", “Götterdämmerung”, and "Parsifal". Strauss used it in "Ein Heldenleben", and Elgar in his 3rd "Pomp and Circumstance" march. It is noticeable in scores by 20th-century composers such as Stravinsky, Honegger, Milhaud, Benjamin Britten, William Walton, Aaron Copland and Samuel Barber. Witold Lutoslawski calls for a tenor drum in his Concerto for Orchestra and Arnold Schoenberg writes for it in his Gurrelieder.

== Multi tenor drums (United States and Latin America) ==
Tenor drums are used as a marching percussion instrument, commonly as mounted sets of 4-6 drums allowing one person to carry and play multiple drums simultaneously. Other names for these drums include names specific to configurations by number of drums: "duos" (2 drums), "tris", "trios", "trips", or "triples" (3 drums), "quads" (4 drums), "quints" (5 drums), and "squints," "hexes," "six-packs," "tenors" or "sextets" (6 drums). The number-specific term "quads" is often used as a generic term for configurations with more than four drums due to it being the original and most common configuration.

Typically there are four main drums, usually either 8, 10, 12, and 13 inches in diameter (which is referred to as a high school configuration or small block tenors) or 10, 12, 13, and 14 inches in diameter (referred to as a Corps configuration or big block tenors), plus one or two accent drums (typically 6 or 8 inches in diameter). The accent drums are also known as shot, gock, spock, or spike drums; They are usually tightened as high as they can go to achieve maximum effect. Other percussion instruments, such as cowbells or cymbals mounted to the rim, are sometimes also added.

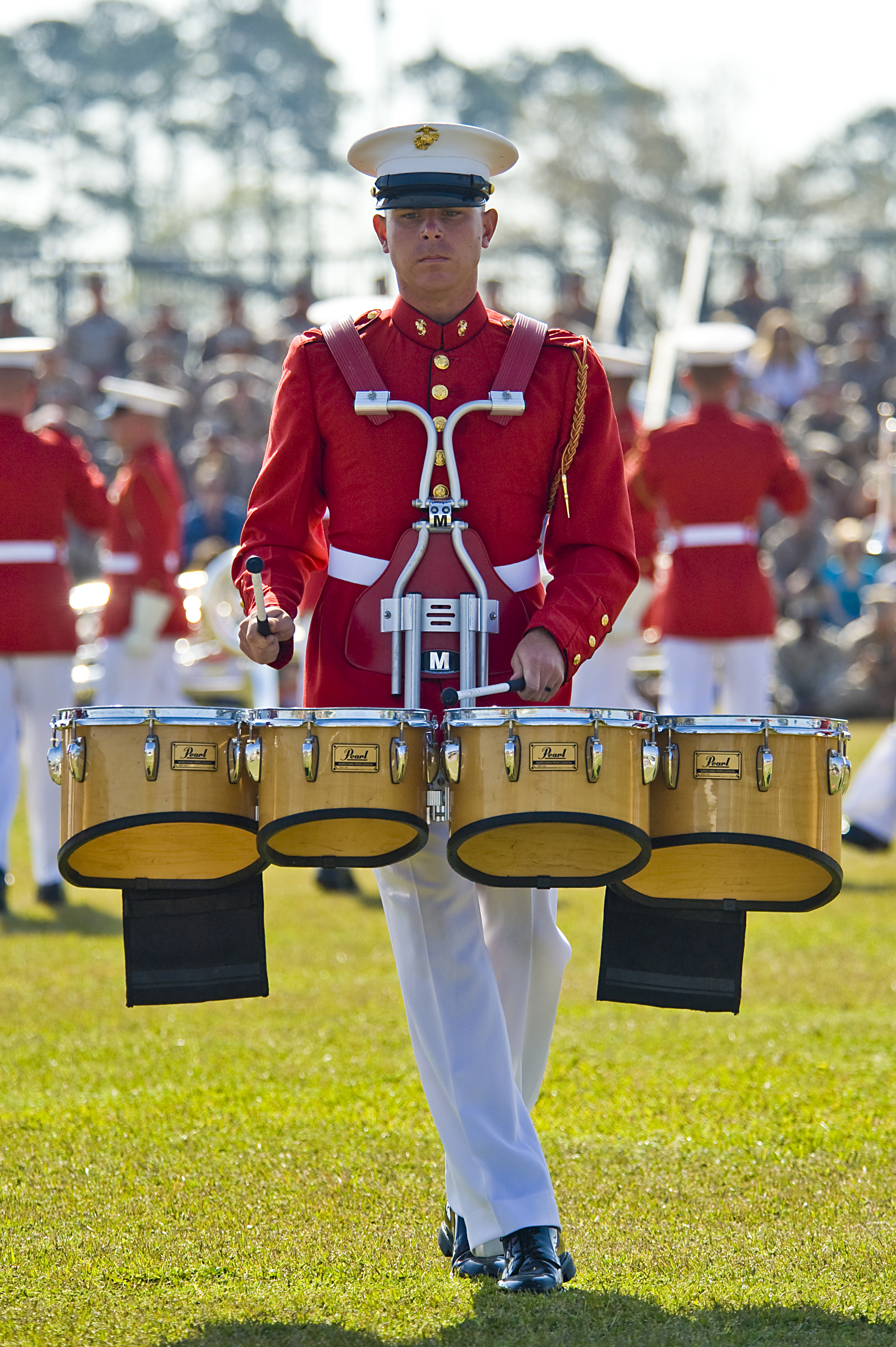
Multi tenor drums

The purpose of the tenors in the marching band is to add more color to the music. In big lines, there can be as many as 6 tenor players. Many high school marching bands will have one to three tenors, while it is typical for World Class drum corps to contain as many as four or five. They tend to supplement the snare part, and often the tenor parts are rudimentally identical to the snare parts. Movement around the drums allows tenors to function as melodic percussion, as each drum has a different pitch.

A four drum configuration is typically arranged so that the lowest drum is to the player's far left, the second lowest is on the player's far right, the second highest is on the middle left, and the highest is on the middle right. This makes it easier to play common patterns, and is easier to balance than if the drums were in ascending size order. This arrangement is ideal for right-handed players and is almost always the arrangement in lines that consist of more than one tenor player for uniformity. If there is a fifth drum (often called the shot or spock drum) it is placed between the player and the highest two drums. If there are six drums, the fifth and sixth drum are centered closest to the player's body.

Most of the time, tenor drums are tuned relatively tightly, giving them a high-pitched sound that carries well outdoors. Within the set of drums, the main drums are tuned to relative intervals (more common intervals being the minor 3rd, perfect 4th, and perfect 5th), while the accent drums are generally tuned as high as possible without breaking the head (often humorously referred to as "higher" and "highest", in the case of a 6-drum set).

Tenor drums are played with mallets or drumsticks. A wide variety of implements are available, encompassing a full spectrum of shaft materials (hickory and aluminum are the most popular), head materials (wood, plastic/nylon, rubber, felt, and fleece "puffs" are all common), and head shape/size (ranging from large "cartwheel" discs, sometimes referred to as "cookie cutters", to traditional drum stick beads).

Tenor players use matched grip. This facilitates tenor techniques such as "sweeps" or "scrapes" (playing double-bounce, or roll strokes in succession, while moving across different drums) and "crossovers" (crossing one hand over the other to reach a drum). These techniques allow an incredible variety of rhythmic and melodic figures possible on the tenors, as well as adding a distinct visual element to tenor playing.

The drums are played near the edge of the head, like timpani, these areas are often called "zones". This allows for the optimum resonance and fundamental tone of the drum to project. Rim shots are not needed to be hit hard depending on the choice of sticks; hard hits can warp aluminum sticks. The player's sticks can move across the main four drums in a pattern that forms a straight line from drum-to-drum, or the closest part of the drum to the player's body. This reduces the amount of space the player must travel to execute some of the more complex movement patterns. It also allows for less upper arm motion from side-to-side, which streamlines movement to play patterns, and also makes it easier to balance the weight of the drums while marching, or even running, with the drums on.

== Pipe band tenor drum (United Kingdom) ==
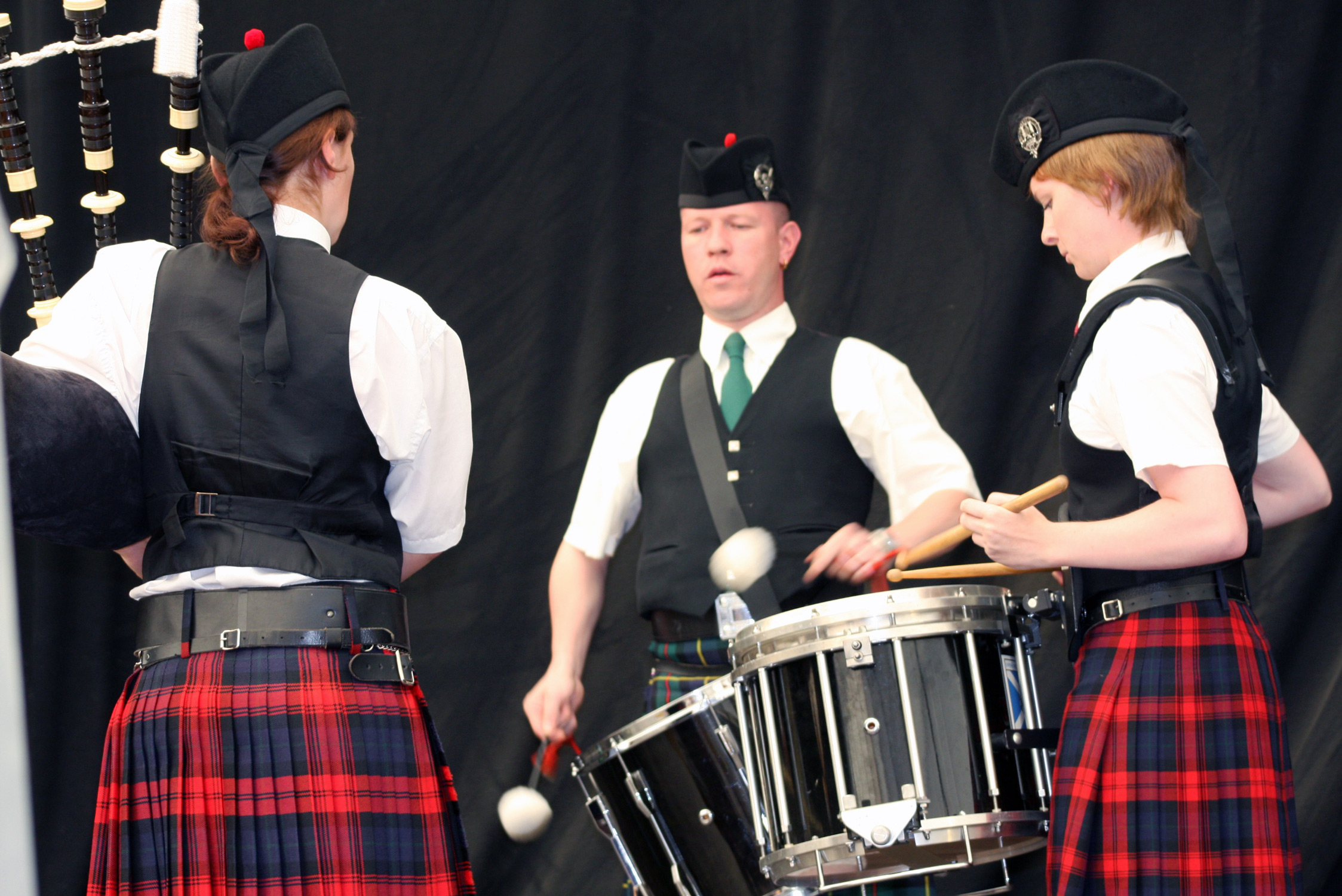
Traditional pipe and band tenor drum

Originally a rope-tensioned drum, giving way to modern rod tension, the single tenor drum occupied a unique position in the drum corps of military and civilian pipe bands, being used as both timekeepers, accents to the musical ensemble, as well as spectacle.

Three types of tenor drum are played in modern pipe bands :

1. Flourishing tenor: Flourishing tenor drummers use beaters on the end of long sticks, which are then tied to the fingers. The beaters are flourished in coordinated movements, while striking the drum; to add "spectacle". Modern pipe bands of average size usually field two to six flourishing tenor drummers.
2. Alto tenor: played in tandem with the bass drum to add sound and keep time. Not all bands use alto tenor drums.
3. Rhythm tenor: played to accent the snare drum part. It usually is played constantly.

This type of drum is often used in pipe bands around the world, along with individual solo competitions. It is mainly used in the "flourishing tenor" style, as a part of the bass section (or midsection).

== Marching band single-head tenor drums ==
In most countries under the Commonwealth of Nations, as well as in the United States, the Philippines, Taiwan, the Netherlands, Indonesia, Italy, Colombia, Panama, Nicaragua, Guatemala, Bolivia, Peru, Brazil, Germany, Spain and France, the tradition of the single tenor drum is maintained by a few military bands, several police bands and many civil marching bands, corps of drums, classic style drum and bugle corps and fanfare bands. The form of the single tenor drum used in these countries is that of a marching drum similar to a snare drum but is without snares, these drums can also be tuned to have a high pitch so that a line of tenor percussionists can run split parts amongst them, in France, Spain, Italy and Germany the form is that of a cylindric drum similar to those used in the field snare drums and the aforementioned early music drum but without the snares. It can also be referred to as a Flub drum.

In the US, single-head tenor drums are popular amongst the ranks of HBCU (historically Black colleges and universities) drumlines, especially in the southern states, where they are used on either the basis of being knee tenors (how snare drums are played) or upright tenors (how bass drums are played). For example, the University of Arkansas at Pine Bluff (UAPB) Marching Musical Machine of the Mid-South's 2 Kold Krank tenor section uses the upright style single-head tenor drums while their rivals, The Alabama State University (ASU) Mighty Marching Hornets' TTB tenor section incorporates the knee single head tenor drums. Either way, these drums are mounted in the same manner as in the marching snare drum, in either slings or the shoulder harness, and can be beaten by either sticks or soft/hard mallets; if in the latter, a mixed form of the pipe band flourish and alto beat is used, while some single tenor drummers are of the rhythm type like those in the Fightin' Texas Aggie Band, while others, like in Germany's many civil fanfare bands, play the alto tenor form or rhythm tenor to accent the bass and snare drums.

The show-style (or Historical Black College University) style incorporates specialized solos for tenor drums, including fanfares (also known as drum callouts), which are played predominantly though football games.

In Spain and Italy, the tenor drums in military bands there are beaten using only a single soft mallet, which is beaten in similar manner just like in the Commonwealth alto tenor drums of pipe bands. Only the French Republican Guard Band has a sole single head tenor drum used as part of the drumline, played using hard sticks.

== See also ==
- Marching percussion
- Floor tom, popular music equivalent
