= Betty Hall =

American politician (1921–2018)

- Hall in 2009

Member of the New Hampshire House of Representatives
- In office 2004–2008
- In office 1986–2002
- In office 1978–1982
- In office 1970–1974

Personal details
- Born: Beatrice Perin Barker; March 18, 1921 Koblenz, Germany
- Died: April 26, 2018 (aged 97) Petersburgh, New York, U.S.
- Party: Independent (since 2010)
- Other political affiliations: Democratic (1986–2010); Republican (until 1986)
- Spouse: Sidney Leavitt Hall (m. 1944; died 1987)
- Children: 5
- Parent: Joseph Warren Barker (father)
- Education: Barnard College

Beatrice Perin Barker Hall (March 18, 1921 – April 26, 2018) was an American politician from the state of New Hampshire. Hall served in the New Hampshire House of Representatives for a total of 28 years, serving non-consecutively from 1970 until 2008.

Hall grew up in New York City, where she attended Barnard College. In 1948, she and her husband moved to the town of Brookline, New Hampshire, where they started a textile manufacturing firm. Beginning in the 1950s and early 1960s, Hall began participating in local politics, serving on several boards and commissions in Brookline. Hall was elected to the Brookline school board in 1963, and in 1972, she was elected to the town board of selectmen.

Hall's career in statewide politics began in 1970 when she was elected to the New Hampshire House of Representatives as a member of the Republican Party. In 1986, Hall switched her party affiliation to the Democratic Party, citing the Republican Party's shift towards conservatism during the Reagan Era. During her political career, Hall was described as a firebrand who frequently bucked her party. While a Republican, Hall was seen as a liberal member of that party, and was considered to be a political enemy by conservative leaders. In the Democratic Party, Hall was a member of the grassroots base, challenging the party's establishment in a 2007 campaign for chairman of the New Hampshire Democratic Party.

In the 2000s, Hall became nationally known for her activism. In 2004, she was arrested for disorderly conduct for her participation in a protest against President George W. Bush; she was later acquitted of the charge. In 2008, Hall introduced New Hampshire House Resolution 24, which would have petitioned the United States Congress to introduce articles to impeach President Bush and Vice President Dick Cheney for their actions leading to and during the Iraq War. While the bill ultimately failed, it generated a large amount of media coverage.

== Pre-political life and career ==
=== Early life and education ===
Beatrice Perin Barker was born on March 18, 1921, in Koblenz, Germany, where her father Joseph Warren Barker, a United States Army officer, served as the administrator of a military district following World War I. After leaving the military, Barker's father completed his education in engineering from the Massachusetts Institute of Technology, receiving an academic position at the institution. He later became the Dean of Engineering at Columbia University, and she primarily grew up in New York City. This led to Barker's entry into academia, as her father's position at Columbia University brought prominent scientists such as Enrico Fermi and Harold Urey to their home for dinner where Barker would serve as a hostess. In 1937, her mother Mary died when Barker was 16.

Barker attended the Horace Mann School and later studied engineering at Barnard College. She would later do graduate work at the University of New Hampshire, Boston University, and the College of the Holy Cross.

=== Family and career ===
After graduating from Barnard College in 1943, Barker worked as an engineer at Western Electric. During World War II, she helped manufacture vacuum tubes for radar equipment, and her father served as a special assistant to Frank Knox, the United States Secretary of the Navy.

On May 27, 1944, she married Sidney Leavitt Hall, an engineer from Concord, New Hampshire, leaving her job at Western Electric to join her husband in Ohio, where he was undergoing training with the United States Air Force in order to fight in World War II. However, the war ended before he was sent overseas, and in 1948, the couple moved to Brookline, New Hampshire, a town of 800 people in Hillsborough County. Hall's grandmother, Florence Hobart Perin, was a resident of Brookline, and Hall had frequently visited and spent several summers in the town during her youth. Sidney Hall initially worked at Textron, and in 1951, the couple started a textile manufacturing firm called Hall Manufacturing Company, which was informally known as Hall Tote Bags. The company produced stitching for dry-cleaners, as well as steam air covers for dry-cleaning machines. Later, the company became locally famous for the tote bags they produced, as well as other stitched products. Hall and her husband were members of the local Church of Christ, and she was credited with uniting the Brookline Methodist and Congregationalist churches into one single church.

In 1957, Hall received a fellowship from the National Science Foundation. Hall served as the assistant manager for Hall Manufacturing Co. until 1962, whereupon she became a science and mathematics teacher in Groton, Massachusetts. Hall transferred to Fairgrounds Junior High School in Nashua, New Hampshire, in 1964, and taught mathematics there until 1972. In 1968, Hall was awarded a grant by the Research Corporation for Science Advancement in order to start an experimental "Mathematics Learning Laboratory" at her school. She had also been invited to academic conferences, such as the Advanced Modern Math Institute, which was sponsored by Science Research Associates.

Sidney Hall died in 1987 at the age of 66. Hall and her husband had four sons and one daughter. One of their sons, Sidney Hall Jr., is a locally-known author. Following her husband's death, Hall solely ran Hall Manufacturing Co., and the company was featured in a White House symposium on small businesses in 1994. Hall Manufacturing Co. closed in 2001.

== Early political career ==
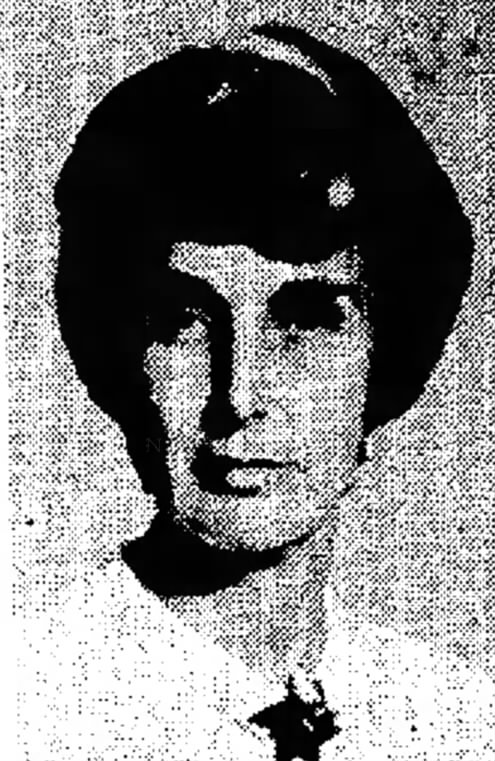
Hall in 1974

=== Local politics ===
During the 1950s and 1960s, Hall became very active in local politics, serving on numerous boards and committees in Brookline, including the board of assessors and the town finance committee. In 1961, Hall was defeated in an election for Brookline library trustee. In 1963, Hall was elected unopposed to the Brookline school board. She was re-elected in 1966, defeating future state representative Eben Bartlett and another candidate. In 1969, Hall was re-elected for her third and final term on the school board. She served as the chairman of the school board from 1964 until 1968 and again in 1971. She served a total of 9 years on the school board.

In 1967, Hall ran for the Brookline board of selectmen; however, she was defeated by Walter W. Frost, receiving 138 votes to Frost's 152. In 1972, Hall served as the chairman of the Brookline Republican Town Committee. Later that year, Hall again ran for the Brookline board of selectmen to succeed the retiring Grover C. Farwell, defeating two candidates to win a three-year term as selectman. Following her election to the board of selectmen, Hall did not seek another term for the school board and resigned as a teacher. In 1974, Hall served as the chairman of the board of selectmen.

=== Early 1970s ===
In 1970, Hall ran for the New Hampshire House of Representatives in Hillsborough County's 13th district as a member of the Republican Party. (Note: This was a multi-member constituency which elected two representatives.) Hall had decided to run for state office because she "realized she was not accomplishing what she wanted to" in local office. She was recruited to run by Governor Walter R. Peterson Jr. Hall and fellow Republican Daniel Brocklebank were elected with 43% and 41% of the vote, respectively. In 1972, Hall ran for re-election in Hillsborough County's 12th district, and was elected unopposed alongside fellow Republican Jack Boyd. During the 1970s, Hall held multiple positions in the local Republican Party, serving as a member of the Republican state committee the Hillsborough County Republican Party Executive Committee.

==== 1974 state senate campaign ====
In 1974, Hall ran for the 12th district of the New Hampshire Senate, running to replace retiring Republican incumbent Frederick A. Porter. In the Republican primary, Hall faced fellow state representative D. Alan Rock, as well as Milford town selectman Frederic Fletcher, a former state senator and former member of the Executive Council. During the primary, Hall campaigned via bicycle, cycling a total of 1,000 miles through the 26 towns in the district. Hall won the primary election, narrowly defeating Rock. Despite Hall placing second in her hometown of Brookline and only winning two towns, Amherst and Hollis, both towns gave her large margins. Additionally, she placed second in nearly every other town in the district, offsetting the large margin by which Rock won in Nashua. Official sources conflict on the final vote tally: the New Hampshire General Court officially reported that Hall received 1,544 votes, Rock received 1,485 votes, and Fletcher received 1,198 votes, giving Hall a winning margin of just 59 votes. However, a recount found that the margin was actually 114 votes in favor of Hall, with the town of Amherst alone overcounting 50 ballots in favor of Rock; however, the results of the recount are not officially recorded. Hall's campaign expenditure for the primary was $1,470.

While there was no official Democratic Party candidate running in the heavily Republican district, both Hall and Rock also contested the Democratic primary as write-in candidates. Rock won the Democratic write-in nomination, with official sources again conflicting on the tally: the New Hampshire General Court reported that Rock received 72 votes to Hall's 71, a margin of just one vote, while a recount reportedly increased Rock's margin to 3 votes.

During the general election campaign, Rock was heavily supported by William Loeb III, the publisher of the Manchester Union Leader, an influential conservative newspaper. Rock frequently used the newspaper's front page to promote his campaign. While Hall was endorsed by the Nashua Telegraph, her campaign did not have the media capabilities that Rock's did, and Rock ultimately won the general election, defeating Hall by a margin of 53% to 47%. Judd Gregg, then the chairman of the Nashua Republican Party, alleged that the party's campaign literature had been tampered with; specifically, Gregg alleged that an individual had switched out Hall's campaign literature from several envelopes and replaced it with Rock's campaign literature before they were sent out to voters in Nashua. However, Hall stated that she did not believe the incident had influenced the end result of the election. Hall was succeeded in the state house by Republican Dorothy Foss Colson.

=== Late 1970s and early 1980s ===
In 1975, Hall became the chairman of the New Hampshire branch of Common Cause, a lobbying group that opposes corruption and promotes campaign finance reform. In this role, Hall advocated for good government. In the 1976 presidential election, Hall criticized Republican candidate Ronald Reagan and independent candidate Eugene McCarthy for being the only two major candidates who had not agreed to the campaign standards proposed by Common Cause. She later criticized all the presidential candidates for not discussing the costs of the programs they propose. Hall left the position in September 1977.

In 1978, Hall was elected back to the New Hampshire House of Representatives for Hillsborough County's 12th district. Hall and fellow Republican Eliot B. Ware won with 36% and 31% of the vote. Hall and Ware were re-elected unopposed in 1980.

In November 1980, Rock, who had still been serving as the state senator for the 12th district, died of cancer just three days after winning re-election. Hall was one of four candidates vying for the Republican nomination for the February 1981 special election; instead of being elected in a primary election, the party nominee was instead to be selected by delegates of the Hillsborough County Republican Party. Hall's campaign for the nomination was heavily opposed by Robert B. Monier, the influential Republican president of the New Hampshire Senate, who viewed Hall as a political opponent. Monier instead supported John Stabile, a Nashua businessman and the New Hampshire campaign chair for John Connally's 1980 presidential campaign. The other Republican candidates were state representatives Joanne Head, Philip Labombarde, and Emma Wheeler. Despite an initial convention ending in deadlock, with 9 delegates voting for Hall and the other 9 for Stabile, the party reconvened and ultimately selected Stabile to be the Republican nominee. Stabile would go on to defeat Democratic state representative Selma Pastor and independent candidate Mark Knox, a Nashua alderman, in the special election.

In 1982, Hall ran for the 11th district of the New Hampshire Senate to replace retiring Republican incumbent Arthur Mann. Hall placed third in the Republican primary, losing to fellow state representative Jean T. White; Hall received 29% of the vote, while White received 40%. The second-place candidate, state representative Richard Amidon, received 31% of the vote. However, Hall won the Democratic nomination as a write-in candidate, receiving 199 votes compared to White's 81 and Amidon's 55. Hall was defeated by White in the general election, receiving 4,668 votes to White's 6,632.

== Party switch and later political career ==
=== Late 1980s and 1990s ===
In 1986, Hall switched to the Democratic Party, citing the Republican Party's shift towards conservatism. That year, Hall ran as a Democrat for the state house in Hillsborough County's 16th district. (Note: This was a single-member constituency which elected one representative.) Hall defeated incumbent Republican state representative Barbara Fried, who had been facing charges of embezzlement after it was revealed she used her position as Greenville town clerk to embezzle $10,000 in fees. Hall received 642 votes, while Fried received 555. Hall was narrowly re-elected in 1988, defeating Republican candidate Shirley A. Morley by just 54 votes out of 2,274 cast. Hall was re-elected in 1990, defeating former Republican state representative Webster E. Bridges, 56% to 44%.

In 1992, Hall ran for re-election in Hillsborough County's 20th district. Hall and Republican Thomas I. Arnold were elected, receiving 1,488 votes and 1,384 votes, respectively. Hall and Arnold had previously served together on the Brookline school board in the 1960s, where Arnold was the school board's moderator. The two were re-elected unopposed in 1994. In 1996, they were again re-elected, with Hall receiving 46% of the vote and Arnold receiving 36%. In 1996, Hall served as the chairman of the Hillsborough County Democratic Party. In 1998, Hall and Arnold were again re-elected. Arnold received 1,063 votes, while Hall received 1,001.

Hall was an early supporter of Bill Clinton in the 1992 United States presidential election, and was a delegate for Clinton at the 1996 Democratic Party convention. Hall also praised Richard Lugar during the 1996 Republican Party presidential primaries, supporting his tax policy and stating that he seemed honest.

=== 2000s ===
The photograph which led to Hall's 2004 arrest becoming national news

In 2000, Hall and Arnold were re-elected unopposed. In 2002, Hall ran for re-election in Hillsborough County's 46th district. (Note: This was a multi-member constituency which elected four representatives.) However, Hall was defeated in the general election, placing fifth with 12% of the vote.

In 2004, Hall was arrested and charged with disorderly conduct at a protest against President George W. Bush in Nashua. Hall, who was 83 at the time, was sitting in a chair outside the designated area for protestors, and was close to the presidential motorcade route. Hall was also holding a sign that said, "Bush is bad for America". After Hall refused to move, three police officers picked Hall up, "chair, cane, and all", carrying her away and arresting her. A photographer captured the arrest, and the incident became national news. Hall was acquitted in September 2004 after Nashua District Court judge Clifford Kinghorn ruled that the evidence provided did not fit the charge of disorderly conduct; Kinghorn stated that "the police had no authority under state law to make Hall move because she wasn't getting in their way". Hall also explained that she had originally written the law that was being applied to her case.

Later in 2004, Hall ran again for the state house for Hillsborough County's 5th district. Hall won, placing fourth with 13% of the vote. In the 2004 Democratic Party presidential primaries, Hall was a supporter of Howard Dean's campaign. Hall was re-elected in 2006, placing fourth and receiving 13% of the vote; Hall narrowly defeated fellow incumbent Donald Ryder, a Republican, receiving just 25 more votes than him.

In 2007, Hall announced her candidacy for chairman of the New Hampshire Democratic Party. Her main opponent was Raymond Buckley, the vice chair of the state party and an executive member of the Democratic National Committee. During the campaign, Buckley, who was considered to be the frontrunner, was falsely accused of possessing child pornography by former state representative Steve Vaillancourt, who had been a former friend of his. Buckley was exonerated following an official state investigation, and Vaillancourt later stated that he had exaggerated in the allegations. Later in the campaign, Joe Kelly Levasseur, the chairman of the Manchester Republican Party, posted an old home video of Buckley to YouTube, in which Buckley, who is openly gay, is seen "cursing and unzipping his pants", as well as highlighting Buckley's membership in a MySpace group called "Gays in New Hampshire". Despite this, Buckley maintained his support amongst statewide Democrats, with the exception of U.S. representative Paul Hodes, who withdrew his support for Buckley following the release of the video. Buckley ultimately defeated Hall, receiving 109 votes to Hall's 17. A third candidate, former state house Democratic Leader Jim Craig, withdrew following Buckley's exoneration, but remained on the ballot.

==== Proposed impeachment of George W. Bush ====
In 2008, Hall again gained national prominence for introducing a bill in the New Hampshire House of Representatives which would petition the United States Congress to introduce articles to impeach President Bush and Vice President Dick Cheney for high crimes and misdemeanors relating to the Iraq War. The bill accused Bush and Cheney of electioneering, torture, unlawful surveillance, misleading Congress, and violating the United Nations Charter by engaging in an unlawful aggressive war, as well as other alleged crimes. The bill, New Hampshire House Resolution 24, cited section 603 of Jefferson's Manual, which states that "an impeachment may be set in motion by the United States House of Representatives by charges transmitted from the legislature of a state". In 1973, Hall had opposed a similar bill calling for the impeachment of President Richard Nixon.

Hall campaigned for impeachment alongside U.S. representative Dennis Kucinich, whose campaign she supported in the 2008 Democratic Party presidential primaries. Hall's bill was supported by Pentagon Papers leaker Daniel Ellsberg, former US attorney general Ramsey Clark, and former director of the Strategic Defense Initiative Robert M. Bowman. However, the bill also had several outspoken opponents, such as Republican state representative David Hess, who stated he had "never seen a document more vitriolic and more inflammatory".

In February 2008, the House State-Federal Relations and Veterans Affairs Committee voted 10-5 to recommend that the House not vote for the bill. In April 2008, the state house voted 227-95 to table the resolution, effectively killing the legislation. Some Democrats who voted in favor of tabling the bill, such as state representatives Ray Gagnon and Susan Almy, both of whom said they supported the bill in principle, stated that the bill would take away time that could be spent fixing everyday issues. Bernie Benn, another Democratic state representative, stated that impeachment would be too divisive.

==== Independent candidacies ====
Later in 2008, Hall ran for the 12th district of the New Hampshire Senate as an independent candidate, despite still being a registered Democrat. Hall placed a distant third with just 10% of the vote. Democrat Peggy Gilmour won with 47% of the vote, while Republican state representative Paul LaFlamme received 43%. In 2010, Hall officially switched her party registration to independent, stating that she "wanted to make a statement [that] neither party was doing what they should be". That year, Hall ran as an independent candidate for the New Hampshire House of Representatives in Hillsborough County's 5th district. However, Hall placed seventh out of eight candidates, receiving just 6% of the vote in the district she formerly represented. In 2012, Hall ran as an independent candidate for the state house in Hillsborough County's 12th district. She placed last out of five candidates, receiving 10% of the vote.

=== Death ===
Hall died on April 26, 2018, of congestive heart failure in Petersburgh, New York. At the time of her death, Hall had 5 children, 12 grandchildren, and 21 great-grandchildren.

== Tenure ==
During her tenure with both the Republican and Democratic parties, Hall frequently challenged her party's political establishment. While in the Republican Party, Hall was seen as a member of the party's liberal wing; she was an objector to the Vietnam War and opposed an attempt to outlaw abortion, with Hall stating, "I don't think I should legislate my religious beliefs on someone else". While a Democrat, Hall was seen as a firebrand emblematic of the party's grassroots base, challenging the Democratic establishment by opposing Buckley in 2007 and leading the attempt to impeach Bush. Hall was described as "a giant among the moral compass-holders in the community".

While in the state house, Hall's primary issues were the government integrity and campaign finance reform. Hall was also an advocate for mental health issues. She served as the first president of Milford Regional Counseling Services in the 1970s, and later founded Harbor Homes, an organization that provides transitional housing for people with mental illness. In the 1960s, Hall was also the president of the Waban Association for Retarded Children.

=== Economy, regulation, and taxation ===
In 1989, Hall led opposition towards a bill which would introduce new regulations against gravel pit operators. However, the following week, in what was described as "parliamentary shenanigans", the bill was revived, amended, and passed in both chambers of the state legislature. Later in 1989, Hall sponsored a bottle bill which would have introduced a 5-cent deposit on bottles and cans in order finance recycling centers. The bill also called for bottles and cans to be recycled instead of reused. Hall sponsored a similar bill in 1979, which would have imposed a tax ranging from $25 to $9,000 a year on businesses in order to fund litter control and recycling.

In 1990, New Hampshire's economy collapsed and the state fell heavily into debt. Hall opposed a bill which would order the state to repay all of its bills within 30 days, stating that it didn't solve the problem and "would only make us think we're doing something". Hall also opposed a budget which would marginally cut spending and levy small taxes, such as a 4-cent cigarette tax and a 5% phone tax, stating that "cutting 10 percent and 20 percent isn't going to do. Nickel and dime taxes aren't going to do it either". She was instead supportive of the legislature stepping back and allow the governor to "reduce spending any way he could". Hall had previously opposed the state budget in 1979 due to the inclusion of a 1-cent gas tax. In 2007, Hall supported legislation pushed by the Regional Greenhouse Gas Initiative which would "reduce carbon pollution from power plants, lower energy bills and strengthen our economy".

=== Education ===
Throughout her career, Hall supported the breaking up of cooperative school districts. Cooperative school districts, known as school administrative units (SAUs), were school districts consisting of multiple towns. Hall said that wealthier, smaller towns would be forced to disproportionately fund an SAU when grouped with poorer, larger towns. She also said the small towns were effectively trapped in the SAU as long as the larger towns were able to out-vote the smaller towns.

In 1971, Hall sponsored legislation which would establish a volunteer corps to provide assistance and counseling to minors who violated the law. In 1973, she sponsored a bill which would create a scholarship program for college students from New Hampshire. After a first attempt failed in the House, the bill was amended to apply only to students attending in-state colleges. The program would provide matching funds for college students: the state would allocate 25 cents for every dollar given by a private scholarship. During her 2008 state senate campaign, Hall stated that she opposed funding education from property taxes, instead supporting a "pay-as-you-go" model.

=== Government integrity and reform ===
In 1972, Hall supported an election reform bill which would restrict candidates from working in polling places in which their name was on the ballot. She was the only representative from a small town to support the bill. Introduced by state representative Chris Spirou, the bill had public support, but faced heavy opposition in the House after being "verbally beaten into the ground by many state representatives from small towns who double as election officials in their home communities". In her support for the bill, Hall said that it could allow for more people to become involved in the political process.

While with Common Cause in 1977, Hall supported a state ethics commission to watch over the state legislature, stating that at the time New Hampshire was the only state that didn't have conflict-of-interest legislation. In 1979, Hall supported a rule change in the state house that would require all members of the House to list their sources of income. In the mid-2000s, Hall stated her concerned with the outsourcing of New Hampshire's vote counting systems to private companies, citing security and integrity concerns. In 2006, Hall proposed a bill which would make primary and general election days a state holiday. The same year, Hall supported a rules change in the state house which would end segregated party seating, which she said increased partisanship by keeping members of opposing parties separated from each other. During her independent candidacies, Hall also advocated for elections to be publicly funded in order to limit the effects of corporate influence on elections. Due to her work on campaign finance reform, Hall was frequently compared to Doris Haddock, who she was friends with, and with whom she collaborated on election reform issues with.
