= Genesis Drum and Bugle Corps =

Junior drum and bugle corps based in Austin, Texas

- Location: Austin, Texas
- Division: World Class
- Founded: 2009
- Director: Chris Magonigal
- Website: www.genesisdbc.org

The Genesis Drum and Bugle Corps is a competitive junior drum and bugle corps, based in Austin, Texas. Genesis performs in Drum Corps International (DCI) competitions.

== History ==
Genesis was founded in September 2009 as a means for youth of the Rio Grande Valley to compete in drum corps, which they saw as the next level of musical competition beyond marching band. After an examination by Drum Corps International to determine the group's organizational stability, it was announced that Genesis was approved to compete in 2010.

Genesis logo

In its inaugural season, Genesis surprised many when it premiered at home in Texas. The corps then toured in Illinois, Michigan, Pennsylvania, and Ohio en route to the DCI Open Class World Championships in Michigan City, Indiana where the corps placed 9th in Open Class.

After its first year, Genesis' staff made the decision to have each season be a "rebirth of the corps," combining new genres of music and visual ideas with the traditional drum corps idiom. In 2011 and 2012, the corps moved up in Open Class, placing 6th both seasons before moving on to World Class prelims, where they finished 30th and 29th. In 2011, Genesis won DCI's "Most Improved Corps" award for Open Class.

In 2013, the corps rose to a 3rd place Open Class finish. Genesis then competed in the DCI World Class Championships in Indianapolis, Indiana, placing 23rd in semifinals, earning full DCI membership, and winning the World Class "Most Improved Corps" award. Additionally, Chris Magonigal was named DCI's Open Class Director of the Year.

In January 2014, Genesis announced that the corps would move its operations from Edinburg, Texas to Austin, Texas. Corps director Chris Magonigal stated: “With its centralized location, dedication to the arts, and its financial possibilities, Austin is the perfect city from which to operate our program.“

At the annual DCI meeting on January 27, 2017, Genesis was approved to compete as a World Class corps.

Genesis also sponsors the Teatro Indoor Percussion Ensemble which competes in the Winter Guard International Independent Open Class. In early September of 2026 it was announced that Genesis would not field a corps for the 2027 DCI season, citing financial concerns.

== Show summary (2010–2026) ==
Key
Light blue background indicates DCI Open Class Finalist
Pale green background indicates DCI World Class Semifinalist

Year	Repertoire	World Championships	
Year	Repertoire	Score	Placement
2010	One Night in the Valley; Quién Sabe (Who Knows) & La Suerte de los Tontos (from Cuban Fire!) by Johnny Richards / Autumn Leaves by Joseph Kosma & Jacques Prévert, adapted by Johnny Mercer / Mambo Inn by Mario Bauzá, Bobby Woodlen & Grace Sampson / 23 Degrees North, 82 Degrees West by Dee Barton & William Joseph Russo / Malagueña by Ernesto Lecuona	84.000	9th Place; Open Class; Finalist
2011	Big Top After Dark; Scenes of a Psychotic Circus by Key Poulan / Send in the Clowns (from A Little Night Music) by Stephen Sondheim	86.850	6th Place; Open Class; Finalist
2011	Big Top After Dark; Scenes of a Psychotic Circus by Key Poulan / Send in the Clowns (from A Little Night Music) by Stephen Sondheim	65.800	30th Place; World Class
2012	Epic; Strength of 1,000 Men by Thomas J. Bergersen / Someone Like You by Adele Adkins & Dan Wilson / Original Music by Edward Gobbel / United We Stand, Divided We Fall by Thomas J. Bergersen	85.500	6th Place; Open Class; Finalist
2012	Epic; Strength of 1,000 Men by Thomas J. Bergersen / Someone Like You by Adele Adkins & Dan Wilson / Original Music by Edward Gobbel / United We Stand, Divided We Fall by Thomas J. Bergersen	63.500	29th Place; World Class
2013	mOZaic; Over the Rainbow, We're Off to See the Wizard, If I Only Had a Brain & Ding Dong! The Witch Is Dead! (all from The Wizard of Oz) by E.Y. Harburg & Harold Arlen / Ease on Down the Road (from The Wiz) by Charlie Smalls / For Good (from Wicked) by Stephen Schwartz / Dark Side of the Moon by Pink Floyd / Riders on the Storm by John Densmore, Robby Krieger, Ray Manzarek & Jim Morrison (The Doors)	91.550	3rd Place; Open Class; Finalist
2013	mOZaic; Over the Rainbow, We're Off to See the Wizard, If I Only Had a Brain & Ding Dong! The Witch Is Dead! (all from The Wizard of Oz) by E.Y. Harburg & Harold Arlen / Ease on Down the Road (from The Wiz) by Charlie Smalls / For Good (from Wicked) by Stephen Schwartz / Dark Side of the Moon by Pink Floyd / Riders on the Storm by John Densmore, Robby Krieger, Ray Manzarek & Jim Morrison (The Doors)	74.650	23rd Place; World Class; Semifinalist
2014	Art of Darkness; Strength of 1,000 Men & United We Stand, Divided We Fall by Thomas J. Bergersen / Lux Aeterna (from Requiem for a Dream) by Clint Mansell / Mad World by Roland Orzabal / Original Music by Edward Gobbel	77.900	3rd Place; Open Class; Finalist
2014	Art of Darkness; Strength of 1,000 Men & United We Stand, Divided We Fall by Thomas J. Bergersen / Lux Aeterna (from Requiem for a Dream) by Clint Mansell / Mad World by Roland Orzabal / Original Music by Edward Gobbel	74.075	23rd Place; World Class; Semifinalist
2015	Phantom Revisited; The Music of the Night, All I Ask of You, Masquerade, Think of Me, Angel of Music & Wishing You Were Somehow Here Again; All from The Phantom of the Opera by Andrew Lloyd Webber	75.750	4th Place; Open Class; Finalist
2015	Phantom Revisited; The Music of the Night, All I Ask of You, Masquerade, Think of Me, Angel of Music & Wishing You Were Somehow Here Again; All from The Phantom of the Opera by Andrew Lloyd Webber	73.500	22nd Place; World Class; Semifinalist
2016	Hell Hath No Fury; Romeo and Juliet Suite No. 2, Op. 64 by Sergei Prokofiev / Love Theme (from Romeo and Juliet) by Nino Rota / Uninvited by Alanis Morissette / My Heart is Broken by Amy Lee, Terry Balsamo, Tim McCord, Will Hunt & Zach Williams (Evanescence) / Dies Irae (from Requiem) by Giuseppe Verdi / Dance of Vengeance (from Medea) by Samuel Barber	75.250	4th Place; Open Class; Finalist
2016	Hell Hath No Fury; Romeo and Juliet Suite No. 2, Op. 64 by Sergei Prokofiev / Love Theme (from Romeo and Juliet) by Nino Rota / Uninvited by Alanis Morissette / My Heart is Broken by Amy Lee, Terry Balsamo, Tim McCord, Will Hunt & Zach Williams (Evanescence) / Dies Irae (from Requiem) by Giuseppe Verdi / Dance of Vengeance (from Medea) by Samuel Barber	73.375	23rd Place; World Class; Semifinalist
2017	The Other Side of Now; Hide and Seek by Imogen Heap / Blue Shades by Frank Ticheli / Master of Puppets by Cliff Burton, Kirk Hammett, James Hetfield & Lars Ulrich (Metallica) / Land of Confusion by Tony Banks, Phil Collins & Mike Rutherford (Genesis) / Both Sides Now by Joni Mitchell / Pure Imagination (from Willy Wonka & the Chocolate Factory) by Leslie Bricusse & Anthony Newley / La Habanera (from Carmen) by Georges Bizet	76.213	23rd Place; World Class; Semifinalist
2018	RetroVertigo; The Day Begins by Peter Knight & Graeme Edge / The Rhythm of the Heat by Peter Gabriel / Retrovertigo by Trevor Dunn / None of Them Knew They Were Robots by Trey Spruance / Inside Straight by John Zorn / Enter Sandman by Kirk Hammett, James Hetfield & Lars Ulrich (Metallica) / Hope by Jonathan Elias / Que Sera, Sera by Jay Livingston & Ray Evans	74.475	24th Place; World Class; Semifinalist
2019	From the Ground Up; Organic Forest & Bulldozers and the Height of Industry by Key Poulan, Dave Marvin, Dan Bryan & Shawn Glyde / The Sound of War by Susanne Sundfør / The Corinthian Song by V. Michael McKay / Original Music by Key Poulan, Dave Marvil, Dan Bryan & Shawn Glyde	78.725	20th Place; World Class; Semifinalist
2020	Season canceled due to the COVID-19 pandemic		
2021	There's No Place Like Home; Kansas, The Tornado, Landing in Oz, Yellow Bricks, Poppies & Approaching the Emerald City by Key Poulan, Shawn Glyde, Mike Huestis & Dan Bryan / Power by Kanye West / The Wicked Witch and the Dark Castle by Shawn Glyde, Mike Huestis & Dan Bryan / Over the Rainbow (from The Wizard of Oz) by Harold Arlen & E.Y. Harburg	No scored competitions	
2022	Dorothy; Over the Rainbow (from The Wizard of Oz) by E.Y. Harburg & Harold Arlen / Goodbye Yellow Brick Road by Elton John & Bernie Taupin / Songs from the Wood from Ian Anderson / Ballad of Heroes by Benjamin Britten	78.813	21st Place; World Class; Semifinalist
2023	Symbio.sys; The Firebird Suite by Igor Stravinsky / Firebird Suite by Isao Tomita / Hide and Seek by Imogen Heap / Asphalt Cocktail by John Mackey / Original Music by Key Poulan & Mike Huestis	78.775	21st Place; World Class; Semifinalist
2024	Signal; Arrival by The Alchemist (musician) / Alfonso Muskedunder by Todd Terje / Waltz for Sweatpants by Cody Fry / Ka Bohaleng/On the Sharp Side by Abel Selaocoe / Waloyo Yamoni by Christopher Tin	77.550	22nd Place; World Class; Semifinalist
2025	Kaleidoscope Heart; Kaleidoscope Heart by Sara Bareilles / My Favorite Things (from The Sound of Music) by Rodgers and Hammerstein / Kaleidoscope by Chappell Roan / 7 Rings by Ariana Grande / Pure Imagination (from Willy Wonka & the Chocolate Factory) by Leslie Bricusse	77.700	22nd Place; World Class; Semifinalist
2026	AbstRacT; Eye of the Untold Her by Lindsey Stirling / Everything In Its Right Place by Radiohead / Cry by David Micic / Buenos Aires by Andrew Webber / Spot A Fake by Ava Max	76.675	23rd Place; World Class; Semifinalist
2027	Corps inative		
