= John B. Corser =

American politician

Member of the New Hampshire House of Representatives from the Hillsborough 2nd district
- In office 1974–1980
- Succeeded by: Richard Amidon

Personal details
- Died: March 19, 2000
- Party: Republican
- Education: Princeton University

John B. Corser Jr. (died March 19, 2000) was an American politician. He served as a Republican member for the Hillsborough 2nd district of the New Hampshire House of Representatives.

== Life and career ==
Corser attended Princeton University.

In 1974, Corser defeated Robert C. Geisel Jr. in the general election for the Hillsborough 2nd district of the New Hampshire House of Representatives, winning 72 percent of the votes.

Corser died on March 19, 2000.
