= Raiders Drum and Bugle Corps =

Open Class competitive junior drum and bugle corps

Raiders Drum & Bugle Corps
- Location: Burlington, New Jersey
- Division: Open Class
- Founded: 1990
- Director: Bob Gupta
- Championship titles: DCI Division III; 2005

The Raiders Drum & Bugle Corps is an Open Class competitive junior drum and bugle corps. Based in Burlington, New Jersey. The Raiders perform in Drum Corps International (DCI) competitions.

== History ==
The Raiders Drum and Bugle Corps was founded in 1990 by George Lavelle, Jr. with George Lavelle Sr., Trent Smith, Clarence Jackson, and Anthony Bestreski joining as members of the initial board of directors. The intent was to provide the opportunity for young people to march in a highly competitive drum corps at an economical cost.

After a year of planning and preparation, the Raiders took the field on June 22, 1991 with a corps of 25 members, defeating two of the other three Division II/III corps in the show. Marching a schedule of local DCI and Garden State Circuit (GSC) shows, the Raiders finished the season by taking second place in the GSC.

The corps' second season saw a growth of nearly 100% and a tour to Ohio, Iowa, and the DCI Division III Championship prelims in Whitewater, Wisconsin, where the corps placed 19th among 29 corps.

In 1993, the corps again grew in numbers and moved to Division II. The Raiders won the first of seven GSC titles that year and finished 15th of 15 corps at DCI Division II Championships in Jackson, Mississippi. The corps marched DII only two more years, finishing placing 14th of 18 corps at DCI in Lowell, Massachusetts in 1994 and 11th of 13 corps at DCI in Buffalo, New York in 1995.

The Raiders board made the decision to return to DIII in 1996 in order to cut expenses. This move paid off immediately, when the corps made finals and placed 7th of 31 corps at the DCI DIII Championships in Orlando, Florida. Over the following eleven years, the Raiders would make the DCI DIII Finals nine times and, in 2005, win the DCI Division III World Championship.

2005 DCI Division III World Champions.

In 2007, the Raiders moved back to Division II, placing 6th at the DCI Championships in Pasadena, California.

DCI combined Divisions II and III into Open Class in 2007, and the Raiders have been a finalist every year since, except 2018 and 2022, placing as high as fifth at Michigan City (prelims) and Indianapolis, Indiana (semis & finals) in 2010.

== Sponsorship ==
The Raiders Drum & Bugle Corps is a program of A+ Education and Performing Arts, a registered non-profit 501(c)(3) musical organization. The corps' Executive Director is Bob Gupta.

== Show summary (1992–2026) ==
Key
Light blue background indicates DCI Open Class Finalist (Note: From 1992–2007, the Raiders competed in Division II and Division III; and since 2008, they have competed in Open Class. These are the same tier, just renamed.)
Light green background indicates DCI Division III Semifinalist
Goldenrod background indicates DCI Open Class Champion

Year	Repertoire	World Championships	
Year	Repertoire	Score	Placement
1991	Russian Sailor's Dance (from The Red Poppy) by Reinhold Glière / To the Last Whale by David Crosby & Graham Nash / Victory at Sea by Richard Rodgers	Did not attend World Championships	
1992	Victory at Sea by Richard Rodgers	54.700	19th Place; Division III
1993	Queen; Who Wants To Live Forever & Flash's Theme (from Flash Gordon) by Brian May / Bicycle Race & Bohemian Rhapsody by Freddie Mercury	69.100	15th Place; Division II
1994	Jesus Christ Superstar; Overture, Heaven on Their Minds, I Don't Know How to Love Him, Simon Zealotes & Superstar; All from Jesus Christ Superstar by Andrew Lloyd Webber & Tim Rice	74.400	14th Place; Division II
1995	A Chorus Line; I Hope I Get It, At The Ballet, Music and The Mirror & One; All from A Chorus Line by Marvin Hamlisch & Edward Kleban	77.300	11th Place; Division II
1996	Sidewalks of New York; The Sidewalks of New York (East Side, West Side) by Charles B. Lawlor & James W. Blake / Take the 'A' Train by Billy Strayhorn / Harlem Nocturne by Earle Hagen & Dick Rogers / Central Park by Armando Anthony "Chick" Corea / Autumn in New York by Vernon Duke / (I'll Take) Manhattan by Richard Rodgers & Lorenz Hart / The Sidewalks of New York (Reprise) by Charles B. Lawlor & James W. Blake	79.000	7th Place; Division III; Finalist
1997	It Don't Mean a Thing (If It Ain't Got That Swing) by Duke Ellington & Irving Mills / Do Nothing Till You Hear From Me by Duke Ellington & Bob Russell / En Fuego (On Fire) by Michel Camilo / What a Wonderful World by Bob Thiele & George David Weiss / Air Mail Special by Benny Goodman, James Mundy & Charlie Christian	79.500	14th Place; Division III
1998	A Solstice Celebration / Winter Solstice; My Favorite Things (from The Sound Of Music) by Rodgers and Hammerstein / Sometimes in Winter by Steve Katz / O Holy Night by Adolphe Adam & John Sullivan Dwight / Snow by Irving Berlin	81.500	8th Place; Division III; Finalist
1999	A Trilogy of Darkness; Master of Puppets by James Hetfield, Lars Ulrich, Cliff Burton & Kirk Hammett (Metallica) / Jazzhatten Suite by Oliver Nelson / Trilogy by Keith Emerson & Greg Lake	84.400	6th Place; Division III; Finalist
2000	Traditions and Innovations; Piano Concerto No. 2 by Sergei Rachmaninoff / Kashmir by Jimmy Page, Robert Plant & John Bonham / Sunrise by Donna Jean Godchaux	80.750	12th Place; Division III
2001	Pictures at an Exhibition; Promenade, Gnomus, The Old Castle, The Hut of Baba-Yaga & The Great Gate of Kiev; All from Pictures at an Exhibition by Modest Mussorgsky	88.500	2nd Place; Division III; Finalist
2002	Balance; Festive Overture by Dmitri Shostakovich / Masque by W. Francis McBeth / Fifth Symphony, Mvt. 4 by Dmitri Shostakovich	78.300	8th Place; Division III; Semifinalist
2003	Carmina Burana; Carminua Burana by Carl Orff	81.200	4th Place; Division III; Semifinalist
2004	Adams: A Sound Story; Wild Nights of Harmonium, Short Ride in a Fast Machine, Harmonielehre - Mvt. III & Fearful Symmertries; All by John Adams	79.650	6th Place; Division III; Finalist
2005	Jesus Christ Superstar; Overture, Heaven on Our Minds, John 19:10, Garden of Gethsemene, Simon Zealotes & Jesus Christ Superstar; All from Jesus Christ Superstar by Andrew Lloyd Webber & Tim Rice	87.750	1st Place; Division III; Champion
2005	Jesus Christ Superstar; Overture, Heaven on Our Minds, John 19:10, Garden of Gethsemene, Simon Zealotes & Jesus Christ Superstar; All from Jesus Christ Superstar by Andrew Lloyd Webber & Tim Rice	88.800	6th Place; Division II & III; Grand Finalist
2006	Coast to Coast; Awayday by Adam Gorb / Letter from Home by Pat Metheny / Strawberry Soup by Don Ellis	80.500	3rd Place; Division III; Finalist
2007	West Side Story; Prologue, Cool, I Have a Love, One Hand, One Heart, Mambo & Tonight; All from West Side Story by Leonard Bernstein & Stephen Sondheim	84.400	6th Place; Division III; Finalist
2008	Deep Blue; Selections from A Perfect Storm by James Horner / Original Music by Michael Hamilton & Colin Bell	86.250	9th Place; Open Class; Finalist
2009	Isle of Hope; American Elegy by Frank Ticheli / Hungarian Peasant Songs, Romanian Dance for Orchestra, Sz. 47a & Swineherds Dance by Béla Bartók / Gan Ainm (Traditional) / Barber of Seville by Gioachino Rossini	88.250	6th Place; Open Class; Finalist
2010	Platinum Celebration; Celebration Fanfare by Michael Hamilton / Exulate by Samuel Hazo / Exhilaration by Larry Clark / New Beginnings by Peter Boyer	89.150	5th Place; Open Class; Finalist
2011	Blueecentric; Blue Shades by Frank Ticheli / Bluesette by Toots Thielemans / Blue Rondo à la Turk & Bluette by Dave Brubeck / Rhapsody in Blue by George Gershwin	81.900	10th Place; Open Class; Finalist
2011	Blueecentric; Blue Shades by Frank Ticheli / Bluesette by Toots Thielemans / Blue Rondo à la Turk & Bluette by Dave Brubeck / Rhapsody in Blue by George Gershwin	57.500	35th Place; World Class
2012	Warped; Warped by Key Poulan	82.000	10th Place; Open Class; Finalist
2012	Warped; Warped by Key Poulan	61.050	32nd Place; World Class
2013	The Raven: A Descent Into Madness; The Raven by Key Poulan	84.950	9th Place; Open Class; Finalist
2013	The Raven: A Descent Into Madness; The Raven by Key Poulan	64.900	31st Place; World Class
2014	Seasons of the Earth; October by Eric Whitacre / Month of the Cold Moon by Roland Barrett / Into the Joy of Spring by James Swearingen / Kingfishers Catch Fire by John Mackey	69.100	9th Place; Open Class; Finalist
2014	Seasons of the Earth; October by Eric Whitacre / Month of the Cold Moon by Roland Barrett / Into the Joy of Spring by James Swearingen / Kingfishers Catch Fire by John Mackey	66.250	31st Place; World Class
2015	From the Ashes; Olympiada by Samuel Hazo / Fanfare - A Vision and A Dream by Ryan Nowlin / Our Yesterdays Lengthen Like Shadows by Samuel Hazo / Into The Light by Jay Bocook	63.600	11th Place; Open Class; Finalist
2015	From the Ashes; Olympiada by Samuel Hazo / Fanfare - A Vision and A Dream by Ryan Nowlin / Our Yesterdays Lengthen Like Shadows by Samuel Hazo / Into The Light by Jay Bocook	56.675	36th Place; World Class
2016	Industrial Evolution; Fearful Symmetries by John Adams / Hymn of Acxiom by Vienna Teng / Ballet Sacra by David Holsinger	66.825	10th Place; Open Class; Finalist
2016	Industrial Evolution; Fearful Symmetries by John Adams / Hymn of Acxiom by Vienna Teng / Ballet Sacra by David Holsinger	64.850	33rd Place; World Class
2017	Iconic; Who Wants to Live Forever by Brian May / Beat It by Michael Jackson / Let It Be by Lennon–McCartney / Runaway Baby by Bruno Mars, Philip Lawrence, Ari Levine & Brody Brown (The Smeezingtons) / Knights of Cydonia by Matt Bellamy / Bohemian Rhapsody by Freddie Mercury	64.975	12th Place; Open Class; Finalist
2017	Iconic; Who Wants to Live Forever by Brian May / Beat It by Michael Jackson / Let It Be by Lennon–McCartney / Runaway Baby by Bruno Mars, Philip Lawrence, Ari Levine & Brody Brown (The Smeezingtons) / Knights of Cydonia by Matt Bellamy / Bohemian Rhapsody by Freddie Mercury	63.525	36th Place; World Class
2018	Beowulf: The Rise of a Legend; Beowulf: The Rise of a Legend by Jake Kaplan	62.675	14th Place; Open Class
2018	Beowulf: The Rise of a Legend; Beowulf: The Rise of a Legend by Jake Kaplan	60.025	39th Place; World Class
2019	Gateway to the Unknown; Discovery of the Portal, The Conversation, The Veil of Isolation, Teleportation & Our Connected Universe; All by Key Poulan, Dan Bryan & Travis Peterman	64.250	12th Place; Open Class; Finalist
2019	Gateway to the Unknown; Discovery of the Portal, The Conversation, The Veil of Isolation, Teleportation & Our Connected Universe; All by Key Poulan, Dan Bryan & Travis Peterman	62.450	35th Place; World Class
2020	Season canceled due to the COVID-19 pandemic		
2021	Opted out of competition for the season		
2022	Use Your Imagination; Pure Imagination by Leslie Bricusse & Anthony Newley / Hymn of Acxiom by Vienna Teng / Original Music by Key Poulan, Dan Bryan & Travis Peterman	67.625	13th Place; Open Class
2022	Use Your Imagination; Pure Imagination by Leslie Bricusse & Anthony Newley / Hymn of Acxiom by Vienna Teng / Original Music by Key Poulan, Dan Bryan & Travis Peterman	65.825	34th Place; World Class
2023	Circus Reversus; Blazes and Thunder, Trip to the Circus & Clowns the in Send by Key Poulan & Marc Garside / From Now On (from The Greatest Showman) by Justin Paul & Benj Pasek	68.650	10th Place; Open Class; Finalist
2023	Circus Reversus; Blazes and Thunder, Trip to the Circus & Clowns the in Send by Key Poulan & Marc Garside / From Now On (from The Greatest Showman) by Justin Paul & Benj Pasek	67.175	31st Place; World Class
2024	Fan the Flame; Spark by Ed Sheeran & Aaron Dessner / Raging Out of Control by Michael Terry / Fire of Eternal Glory by Dmitri Shostakovich / We Didn't Start the Fire by Billy Joel	73.375	7th Place; Open Class; Finalist
2024	Fan the Flame; Spark by Ed Sheeran & Aaron Dessner / Raging Out of Control by Michael Terry / Fire of Eternal Glory by Dmitri Shostakovich / We Didn't Start the Fire by Billy Joel	71.300	28th Place; World Class
2025	Time[less] Time by Pink Floyd / Ebb & Flow by Michael Terry and Marc Garside / Time in a Bottle by Jim Croce / Clocks by Coldplay	73.750	7th Place; Open Class; Finalist
2025	Time[less] Time by Pink Floyd / Ebb & Flow by Michael Terry and Marc Garside / Time in a Bottle by Jim Croce / Clocks by Coldplay	72.200	28th Place; World Class
2026	ThreadWorx; Metropolis Pt. 1: The Miracle and the Sleeper by Dream Theater / Original Music by Michael Terry, Ryan Reed & Jarod Sullivan	70.725	8th Place; Open Class; Finalist
2026	ThreadWorx; Metropolis Pt. 1: The Miracle and the Sleeper by Dream Theater / Original Music by Michael Terry, Ryan Reed & Jarod Sullivan	71.050	28th Place; World Class
