= Paul LaFlamme =

New Hampshire politician

Member of the New Hampshire House of Representatives from the Hillsborough 61st district
- In office 2002–2004

Member of the New Hampshire House of Representatives from the Hillsborough 35th district
- In office 2000–2002
- Preceded by: Griffin T. Dahanis
- Succeeded by: constituency disestablished

Personal details
- Party: Republican
- Spouse: Kathryn LaFlamme
- Children: 2
- Education: New Hampshire Technical Institute (AA); New Hampshire College

Paul G. LaFlamme Jr. is an American real estate agent and politician who served in the New Hampshire House of Representatives from 2000 until 2004. A member of the Republican Party, LaFlamme represented part of Nashua. LaFlamme is also the president of Spartans Drum and Bugle Corps.

In 2000, LaFlamme ran for the New Hampshire House of Representatives to represent Hillsborough County's 35th district, which contained part of Nashua. LaFlamme defeated the Democratic candidate, Shirley Rayburn, receiving 7,632 votes compared to Rayburn's 7,101. LaFlamme ran for re-election in 2002, having been redistricted into Hillsborough County's 61st district, which was a multi-member constituency. LaFlamme was re-elected, placing first with 19% of the vote.

In 2004, LaFlamme ran for district 12 of the New Hampshire Senate. However, LaFlamme was defeated in the Republican primary by fellow state representative Harry Haytayan. Haytayan would go on to lose against Democrat David Gottesman. In 2006, LaFlamme ran again for the New Hampshire House of Representatives to represent Hillsborough County's 20th district. LaFlamme was defeated in the general election, placing fourth with 16% of the vote; the district elected three representatives.

In 2008, LaFlamme again ran for district 12 of the New Hampshire Senate, facing Democrat Peggy Gilmour, as well as Betty Hall, a longtime Democratic state representative who was running as an independent candidate. LaFlamme was narrowly defeated by Gilmour, receiving 11,655 votes compared to Gilmour's 12,510, with Hall receiving 2,690 votes.

During his tenure in the New Hampshire House of Representatives, LaFlamme was a leading proponent for the restriction of greyhound racing in New Hampshire, including spearheading a successful campaign to override Governor Craig Benson's veto of such legislation. LaFlamme also voted against right-to-work legislation, and was a state surrogate for the 2008 presidential campaign of John McCain. LaFlamme is a member of the board of directors of GREY2K USA Worldwide.
