= Eben Bartlett =

American politician (1912–1983)

Member of the New Hampshire House of Representatives from the Hillsborough 16th district
- In office November 6, 1982 – February 6, 1983

Personal details
- Born: July 14, 1912 Goffstown, New Hampshire, U.S.
- Died: February 6, 1983 (aged 70) Boston, Massachusetts, U.S.
- Party: Republican
- Education: University of New Hampshire

Military service
- Branch/service: United States Army
- Years of service: 1940s–1960s
- Rank: Lieutenant colonel
- Unit: 7th Infantry Division
- Battles/wars: World War II: European theatre; Korean War
- Awards: Bronze Star Medal; Croix de Guerre; Legion of Merit

Eben Byron Bartlett Jr. (July 14, 1912 – February 6, 1983) was an American military officer and politician from New Hampshire. Bartlett was a member of the New Hampshire House of Representatives, serving for four months until his death in office in 1983.

== Biography ==
Bartlett was born on July 14, 1912, in Goffstown, New Hampshire. He graduated from the University of New Hampshire. Bartlett, a lieutenant colonel in the United States Army, fought in the European theatre of World War II. In 1947, Bartlett served as the president of the New Hampshire branch of the Reserve Officers Association. He later fought in the Korean War, serving as a G-2 intelligence officer with the 7th Infantry Division. During his military career, Bartlett was awarded several medals, including the Bronze Star, the Legion of Merit, and the French Croix de Guerre.

In 1964, Bartlett was elected to the board of selectmen of the town of Brookline for a three-year term, defeating Theodore F. Michos. However, Bartlett resigned from the office in June 1966, citing "personal business affairs". Earlier in 1966, Bartlett had run for the Brookline school board, but was defeated by incumbent Betty Hall. In July 1966, Bartlett, a member of the Republican Party, announced his candidacy for the New Hampshire House of Representatives; he was defeated by either Webster E. Bridges Jr. or Grover C. Farwell.

In 1982, Bartlett was elected to the state house for Hillsborough County's 16th district; he defeated Barbara A. Fried, receiving 633 votes to Fried's 585. Bartlett died on February 6, 1983, at the Veterans Administration Hospital in Boston at the age of 70, serving in the state house for only four months.

Bartlett's son Charles was a captain in the United States Army, serving in the 27th Field Artillery Regiment. Charles was also a professor of military science at Murray State University in Kentucky, and later served in the Vietnam War.
