= Joseph Warren Barker =

American engineer (1891–1975)

- Born: June 17, 1891; Lawrence, Massachusetts, U.S.
- Died: December 10, 1975 (aged 84); New Rochelle, New York, U.S.
- Education: MIT (BS, 1916; MS, 1925)
- Occupations: Electrical engineer, Academic administrator
- Known for: Engineering education reform, Scientific research funding
- Awards: ASME President (1956–1957); Honorary doctorates from various institutions

Joseph Warren Barker (June 17, 1891 – December 10, 1975) was an American electrical and mechanical engineer, Dean of the Faculty of Engineering at Columbia University, and 75th president of the American Society of Mechanical Engineers in the year 1956-57.

== Biography ==
=== Family ===
His daughter was longtime New Hampshire state representative Betty Hall.

=== Youth and early career ===
Barker was born in Lawrence, Massachusetts in 1891, son of Frederick Barker and Alice Ann (Alletson) Barker. He started his studies at the University of Chicago in the year 1909-10. Then he moved to Massachusetts Institute of Technology, where he obtained his BSc in Electrical Engineering in 1916.

After his graduation in 1916 he enlisted in the U.S Navy, where he served United States Army Coast Artillery Corps in 1916-17 and 1923-24. He resigned as Army officer in 1925, and got appointed associate professor of engineering at the Massachusetts Institute of Technology. Next at the Lehigh University he was professor of electrical engineering.

=== Further career and honours ===
From 1930 to 1946 Barker served as Dean of Engineering at Columbia University. In World War II he was special assistant to Secretary of the Navy Frank Knox in Washington. As chief of the Division of Training Liaison Coordination he reorganizing the training and education program for the U.S. Navy. Afterwards he was awarded the Navy Distinguished Civilian Service Award.

Barker retired from Columbia in 1946, and next until 1974 served as president and board chairman of the Research Corporation, a science advancement foundation. In the year 1956-57 he also served as president of the American Society of Mechanical Engineers.

Barker was awarded an honorary doctorate from Northeastern University in 1940; an LL.D. from Bucknell University also in 1940; and an honorary doctorate of engineering from Case School of Applied Science, now Case School of Engineering.

== Selected publications ==
- Joseph Warren Barker, Technique of economic studies of lighting in industry, 1927.
- Joseph Warren Barker, Research Corporation (1912–1952): Dedicated to Progress in Education and Science. New York: Newcomen Society in North America, 1952
