= Joanne Head =

American politician (1930–2021)

Member of the New Hampshire House of Representatives
- In office 1976–1984

Personal details
- Born: September 28, 1930 Buffalo, New York, U.S.
- Died: January 1, 2021 (aged 90) Peterborough, New Hampshire, U.S.
- Party: Republican
- Spouse: Thomas F. Head III (m. 1949; died 2019)
- Children: 2
- Education: Connecticut College; Antioch College

Joanne Crane Head (September 28, 1930 – January 1, 2021) was an American politician who served in the New Hampshire House of Representatives from 1976 to 1984 as a member of the Republican Party.

== Biography ==
Head was born on September 28, 1930, in Buffalo, New York, and she grew up in the state. She graduated from Connecticut College and later received a Master's degree from Antioch College. In 1968, Head was awarded the Theodore Roosevelt Award for her contributions to hospitals on Long Island. At some point after this, Head moved to the town of Amherst, New Hampshire.

In 1976, Head, a member of the Republican Party, ran for the New Hampshire House of Representatives in Hillsborough County's 10th district. (Note: This was a multi-member constituency which elected three representatives.) Head was elected alongside fellow Republicans Josephine C. Martin and M. Arnold Wight. Head placed first with 32% of the vote, while Martin and Wight received 31% and 25% of the vote. A fourth candidate, Democrat John B. Mendolusky, lost with 13% of the vote. Head and Wight ran for re-election in 1978. Head again placed first with 29% of the vote, with Wight receiving 28%. Republican David T. Ramsey was also elected, receiving 24% of the vote, while two Democrats received 12% and 8%.

In 1980, Head and Wight again ran for re-election. The pair were elected unopposed alongside a third Republican, B. P. Smith. Head placed first with 36% of the vote, while Wight and Smith received 34% and 29%. Later in 1980, following the death of incumbent state senator D. Alan Rock, Head announced her candidacy for the 1981 special election to fill Rock's seat in the New Hampshire Senate. The Republican nominee was to be chosen by delegates of the Hillsborough County Republican Party rather than in a primary. Head faced businessman John Stabile and state representatives Betty Hall, Philip Labombarde, and Emma Wheeler. Stabile ultimately won the primary and defeated state representative Selma Pastor, the Democratic nominee, in the special election.

In 1982, Head, Wight, and Smith ran for re-election in Hillsborough County's 9th district. (Note: This was a multi-member constituency which elected four representatives.) The trio were elected unopposed alongside a fourth Republican, Peter F. Wells; Head placed first with 28% of the vote, with Wight receiving 26%, and Wells and Smith both receiving 23%. In 1984, Head ran for the 9th District of the state senate. She faced Republican National Committeewoman Sheila Roberge, former state representative Guy R. Granger, and two other opponents in the Republican primary. Roberge narrowly defeated Head by just 27 votes. A recount expanded Roberge's lead to 30; the final vote total was 1,353 votes for Roberge compared to 1,323 votes for Head.

During her tenure in the state house, Head served on the Labor, Human Resources and Rehabilitation, Appropriations, and Health and Welfare committees, also serving as chairman of the latter. Head sponsored several bills, including a bill which would prohibit large oil companies from operating gas stations in the state, and another which allocated $250,000 in order to create drug and alcohol abuse prevention education programs in schools. In 1977, Head lead the opposition to a bill sponsored by Democrat Joseph Cote which would increase New Hampshire's minimum wage from $2.30 to $2.60; the bill was ultimately defeated by Head's efforts. Head stated that she believed increasing the minimum wage would put New Hampshire at a disadvantage when compared to its neighboring states, and that New Hampshire's traditional industries were already suffering under a poor economy. From 1986 until 1989, Head served as the chair of the Hillsborough County Republican Party.

Head died at her home in Peterborough, New Hampshire, on January 1, 2021, at the age of 90. She had been married to Thomas F. Head III for 70 years until his death in 2019.
