= Mandarins Drum and Bugle Corps =

Drum Corps International member corps

- Mandarins Drum and Bugle Corps logo
- Location: Sacramento, CA
- Division: World Class
- Founded: 1963
- President: Daniel Fong
- Director: JW Koester
- Championship titles: DCI Open Class: 1987; 1988; 1992; 1996; 1997; 1998; 1999; 2001
- Website: www.mandarins.org

The Mandarins Drum and Bugle Corps is a World Class competitive drum and bugle corps. Based in Sacramento, California, the Mandarins is a member corps of Drum Corps International (DCI). Holders of eight DCI divisional championship titles, the Mandarins made its first World Class Finals appearance on August 11, 2018, with a tenth-place finish.

== History ==
The corps was founded in 1963 as the Ye Wah Drums and Lyras Corps, an activity for youth of Chinese-American heritage. Roy Wong, Frank Lim, Thomas Fong, and Yuk Fong had originally approached the Sacramento Chinese community with the intent of starting a drum and bugle corps to perform at the many festivals and parades held each year in the Sacramento area. After struggling to get underway, the corps made its debut on the Fourth of July, 1963. A color guard was added to the corps in 1964 and became a competitive unit in 1965.

Entering the field as a competition corps, the group changed its name to the Mandarins Drum and Bugle Corps in 1967. The corps competed only in Northern California until making its first trip to Southern California in 1970. Since that first trip, the corps has represented its community, Sacramento, and California around the country and abroad. Mandarins appeared in the Taiwan presidential inaugural ceremonies in 1972 and '78. In 1974, they went to Hawaii to march in the King Kamehameha Parade. In 1975, they made their first trip to the Pacific Northwest and Canada. They made their first appearance at the DCI World Championships at Denver in 1978.

In 1983, under the leadership of Executive Director Ray Mar, the corps began working toward becoming a highly successful competitive corps, and they have been regular competitors in DCI since 1986, winning Class A60/Division III championships in 1987, '88, '92, and '96 through '99 and the Division II title in 2001. Mandarins moved into Division I (now World Class) in 2003, and their highest finish has been 6th place, earned in 2023.

In 2014, the Mandarins and the Sacramento State Department of Music entered into a partnership to conduct the Mandarins Academies. These are performing arts camps held on the Sacramento State campus to help youth develop their skills in brass, percussion, woodwinds, and color guard performance, and in drum major conducting.

== Show summary (1978–2026) ==
Key
Light blue background indicates DCI Open Class Finalist (Note: From 1986–1991, the Mandarins competed in Class A60, and from 1992–2002 in Division II & III; these are the same tier, and have since been renamed Open Class.)
Goldenrod background indicates DCI Open Class Champion
Pale green background indicates DCI World Class Semifinalist (Note: From 2003–2007, the Mandarins competed in Division I, and have competed since 2008 in World Class. These are the same tier, just renamed.)
Pale blue background indicates DCI World Class Finalist

| Year | Repertoire | World Championships | |
| Year | Repertoire | Score | Placement |
|---|---|---|---|
| 1978 | Repertoires unavailable | 43.250 | 12th Place; Class A |
| 1979–83 | Repertoires unavailable | Did not attend World Championships | |
| 1984 | Legacy by Bob James / Light on my Life by Bill Sharpe & Roger Odell / Loisita by Bill Sharpe & Roger Odell | Did not attend World Championships | |
| 1985 | Ponteio by Edú Lobo & Jose Carlos Capinam / Rainmaker by Earl Klugh / Dark Orchid by Sammy Nestico | Did not attend World Championships | |
| 1986 | Dark Orchid by Sammy Nestico / Rainmaker by Earl Klugh / Bossa Netti by Vic Cionetti / Copacabana by Barry Manilow, Jack Feldman & Bruce Sussman | 64.800 | 10th Place; Class A60 |
| 1987 | Storm at Sun-Up by Gino Vannelli / Celebration Suite by Chick Corea / Voyager by Derrick Graves, Dexter Wansel, George Howard, Herb Smith & Steve Gold / Sweet Cheryl Lynn by Chuck Mangione | 85.300 | 1st Place; Class A60; Champion |
| 1987 | Storm at Sun-Up by Gino Vannelli / Celebration Suite by Chick Corea / Voyager by Derrick Graves, Dexter Wansel, George Howard, Herb Smith & Steve Gold / Sweet Cheryl Lynn by Chuck Mangione | 61.900 | 20th Place; Open Class |
| 1988 | The Sorcerer and the Latin by Vic Schoen / In Her Family by Pat Metheny / Celebration Suite by Chick Corea / Voyager by Derrick Graves, Dexter Wansel, George Howard, Herb Smith & Steve Gold / More Than the Stars by Eddie Cole | 80.200 | 1st Place; Class A60; Champion |
| 1988 | The Sorcerer and the Latin by Vic Schoen / In Her Family by Pat Metheny / Celebration Suite by Chick Corea / Voyager by Derrick Graves, Dexter Wansel, George Howard, Herb Smith & Steve Gold / More Than the Stars by Eddie Cole | 53.700 | 19th Place; Open Class |
| 1989 | Dreams of the Sirens by Russ Freeman / In Her Family by Pat Metheny / Minuano & The First Circle by Pat Metheny & Lyle Mays | 87.100 | 3rd Place; Class A60; Finalist |
| 1989 | Dreams of the Sirens by Russ Freeman / In Her Family by Pat Metheny / Minuano & The First Circle by Pat Metheny & Lyle Mays | 64.700 | 18th Place; Open Class |
| 1990 | The First Circle by Pat Metheny & Lyle Mays / Letter From Home & Third Wind by Pat Metheny / Minuano & Flight of the Falcon by Pat Metheny & Lyle Mays | 88.200 | 2nd Place; Class A60; Finalist |
| 1990 | The First Circle by Pat Metheny & Lyle Mays / Letter From Home & Third Wind by Pat Metheny / Minuano & Flight of the Falcon by Pat Metheny & Lyle Mays | 63.900 | 19th Place; Open Class |
| 1991 | Let There Be Praise & In His Presence by Dick and Melodie Tunney / So Much 2 Say by Cedrick Dent & Mervyn Warren / Miracles Can Happen by Brent Henderson & Craig Patty / Make His Praise Glorious by Bill and Robin Wolaver | 85.600 | 2nd Place; Class A60; Finalist |
| 1992 | Joy (Traditional) / Jubilee Variations, Appalachian Spring & The Red Pony by Aaron Copland | 90.000 | 4th Place; Division II & III; Finalist |
| 1992 | Joy (Traditional) / Jubilee Variations, Appalachian Spring & The Red Pony by Aaron Copland | 67.800 | 26th Place; Division I |
| 1993 | Episode Five for Brass by Carl Hilding "Doc" Severinsen / Adagio for Strings by Samuel Barber / Rocky Point Holiday by Ron Nelson | 92.600 | 2nd Place; Division II & III; Finalist |
| 1993 | Episode Five for Brass by Carl Hilding "Doc" Severinsen / Adagio for Strings by Samuel Barber / Rocky Point Holiday by Ron Nelson | 67.200 | 26th Place; Division I |
| 1994 | Voices of a Planet; Black Forest by Brian Slawson / Dance of the Hunter's Fire by Airto Moreira, Babatunde Olatunji, Flora Purim, Sikiru Adepoju & Vikku Vinayakram / Minuano by Pat Metheny & Lyle Mays / Bones by Mickey Hart, Zakir Hussain, Babatunde Olatunji & Flora Purim / Udu Chant by Sikiru Adepoju, Mickey Hart, Zakir Hussain & Airto Moreira / Appalachian Morning by Paul Halley | 90.800 | 3rd Place; Division II & III; Finalist |
| 1995 | Cinematic Impressions; Theme from Speed by Mark Mancina / The Wedding Night (from Marnie) by Bernard Herrmann / A Perilous Direction, The Honeymoon & The Creation (from Mary Shelley's Frankenstein) by Patrick Doyle | 91.500 | 2nd Place; Division III; Finalist |
| 1995 | Cinematic Impressions; Theme from Speed by Mark Mancina / The Wedding Night (from Marnie) by Bernard Herrmann / A Perilous Direction, The Honeymoon & The Creation (from Mary Shelley's Frankenstein) by Patrick Doyle | 69.100 | 22nd Place; Division I |
| 1996 | To the Edge; Taiko Drumming (Original) / Rhythm of the Saints by Paul Simon / Cirque du Soleil by René Dupéré | 94.000 | 1st Place; Division III; Champion |
| 1996 | To the Edge; Taiko Drumming (Original) / Rhythm of the Saints by Paul Simon / Cirque du Soleil by René Dupéré | 69.300 | 21st Place; Division I |
| 1997 | Passport; Ghost Train (from The Ghost Train Triptych) / The Ride (from The Ghost Train) / At the Station & The Motive Revolution (from The Ghost Train Triptych) / Bullet (from The Ghost Train); All by Eric Whitacre | 94.800 | 1st Place; Division III; Champion |
| 1997 | Passport; Ghost Train (from The Ghost Train Triptych) / The Ride (from The Ghost Train) / At the Station & The Motive Revolution (from The Ghost Train Triptych) / Bullet (from The Ghost Train); All by Eric Whitacre | 73.100 | 20th Place; Division I |
| 1998 | Dragon Dance - Tan Dun; Dragon Dance by Tan Dun / Happy Valley by Vanessa-Mae / The Butterfly Lovers by Chen Gang and He Zhanhao | 93.800 | 1st Place; Division III; Champion |
| 1998 | Dragon Dance - Tan Dun; Dragon Dance by Tan Dun / Happy Valley by Vanessa-Mae / The Butterfly Lovers by Chen Gang and He Zhanhao | 71.500 | 23rd Place; Division I |
| 1999 | Transformations; Overture & Make Our Garden Grow (from Candide) / Symphonic Suite (from On the Waterfront); All by Leonard Bernstein | 93.700 | 1st Place; Division III; Champion |
| 1999 | Transformations; Overture & Make Our Garden Grow (from Candide) / Symphonic Suite (from On the Waterfront); All by Leonard Bernstein | 73.900 | 20th Place; Division I |
| 2000 | Katachi: The Essence of Design; Heroes Symphony & V2 Schneider by Philip Glass / Anakin's Theme, The Droid Battle, Panaka & Duel of the Fates (from Star Wars: Episode I – The Phantom Menace) by John Williams | 94.300 | 2nd Place; Division II & III; Finalist |
| 2000 | Katachi: The Essence of Design; Heroes Symphony & V2 Schneider by Philip Glass / Anakin's Theme, The Droid Battle, Panaka & Duel of the Fates (from Star Wars: Episode I – The Phantom Menace) by John Williams | 74.350 | 18th Place; Division I |
| 2001 | Festival of Music; Music for a Festival, Variations on an Enigma, Mountain Song & Partita; All by Philip Sparke | 97.800 | 1st Place; Division II & III; Champion |
| 2001 | Festival of Music; Music for a Festival, Variations on an Enigma, Mountain Song & Partita; All by Philip Sparke | 79.300 | 16th Place; Division I Semifinalist |
| 2002 | Year of the Dragon; Year of the Dragon by Philip Sparke / Montage by Peter Graham / A London Overture & Diversions by Philip Sparke | 95.800 | 3rd Place; Division II & III; Finalist |
| 2002 | Year of the Dragon; Year of the Dragon by Philip Sparke / Montage by Peter Graham / A London Overture & Diversions by Philip Sparke | 78.050 | 19th Place; Division I |
| 2003 | Black Market Bazaar; Symphony No. 2 in B Minor, Polovetsian Dances (from Prince Igor) & In the Steppes of Central Asia by Alexander Borodin / Bacchanale (from Samson and Delilah) by Camille Saint-Saëns | 80.300 | 18th Place; Division I |
| 2004 | Samurai; Red Warrior (from The Last Samurai) by Hans Zimmer / Ouverture Solennelle by Pyotr Ilyich Tchaikovsky / Tabidachi, Nishi he (Departure to the West) by Joe Hisaishi / Bullet by Wong / The Way of the Sword (from The Last Samurai) by Hans Zimmer | 77.750 | 20th Place; Division I |
| 2005 | Loves Me... Loves Me Not... Adagio (from Spartacus) by Aram Khachaturian / Rhapsody on a Theme of Paganini (Variation 18) by Sergei Rachmaninoff / Vibraphonissimo & Nuevo Tango by Astor Piazzolla / Symphonic Dances, Mvt. 3 by Sergei Rachmaninoff | 78.100 | 17th Place; Division I Semifinalist |
| 2006 | Rhythm Nation; Martillo by Luis Garay / Egyptian Danza by Al Di Meola / Back Home by Nando Lauria / Din Daa Daa by George Kranz / Rhythm Nation by James Harris, Terry Lewis & Janet Jackson / Clapping Music by Steve Reich / Episode - Prelude by Nando Lauria / Tell it All & The Way Up by Lyle Mays & Pat Metheny | 77.875 | 17th Place; Division I Semifinalist |
| 2007 | Dragon Dance; Tea in Chinese Camp, Call of the Mountain (from Gates of Gold) & Shadow and Light by Joseph Curiale / Battle in the Forest (from House of Flying Daggers) by Shigeru Umebayashi / Jubilation Dragon Dance by Tan Dun | 75.200 | 21st Place; Division I |
| 2008 | The River; Wind River by Joseph Curiale / Cajun Folksong by Frank Ticheli / Sunrise (from Grand Canyon Suite) by Ferde Grofé / Inferno (from The Divine Comedy) by Robert W. Smith | 77.925 | 19th Place; World Class |
| 2009 | ABSOLUTE; Absolute Fanfare: Festive Overture by Dmitri Shostakovich; Absolute Passion: Libertango by Astor Piazzolla; Absolute Joy: Ode to Joy (from Symphony No. 9) by Ludwig van Beethoven / Joy (Traditional) / Christmas Anthem by Robert W. Smith; Absolute Rhythm & Absolute Velocity: Partita by Philip Sparke | 79.650 | 18th Place; World Class |
| 2010 | To Dream of Far Away Lands; Meetings Along the Edge by Philip Glass & Ravi Shankar / The Mountain of Fruit and Flowers by David Buckley / Samudra Manthan by Shivkumar Sharma / Quiet by Sheila Chandra, Steve Coe & Martin Smith / Ever So Lonely by Steve Coe / Ambush from Ten Sides (Chinese Traditional) | 78.100 | 19th Place; World Class |
| 2011 | The Forty Thieves: An Ancient Tale of Spices, Toxins, and Perfumes; Octabones by Adi Morag / Spices, Perfumes, and Toxins by Avner Dorman | 75.700 | 21st Place; World Class; Semifinalist |
| 2012 | Prophecy; I.Ancient Prophecy; II.The Guardian; III.Sacrifice; IV.Doomsday/New Dawn; All by Key Poulan | 71.600 | 23rd Place; World Class; Semifinalist |
| 2013 | DESTINATION AMERICA: Journey of the Paper Sons; I.The Promise of a Better Life; II.Journey to America; III.Arrival and Interrogation; IV.Prosperity; All by Key Poulan, Tony Nunez & Kevin Shaw | 79.750 | 18th Place; World Class; Semifinalist |
| 2014 | UnbreakABLE: The Human Spirit Is Limitless; I.Forged Steel; II.Diamonds Under Pressure; III.Struggle; IV.Courage and Inspiration; All by Key Poulan, Tony Nunez & Kevin Shaw | 78.150 | 21st Place; World Class; Semifinalist |
| 2015 | RESURRECTION; I. The Awakening; II. Warrior; III. The Dynasty of the Emperor; IV. Forever in Stone; All by Key Poulan with Sean Womack & Mark Hunter | 76.425 | 20th Place; World Class; Semifinalist |
| 2016 | Forbidden Forest; I. Into the Forest; II. The Calling (inspired by Devilish Love from Hemingway's Garden of Eden); III. Our Demons Within; IV. Triumph of our Inner Self; All by Key Poulan, Mark Hunter & Sean Womack / The Calling by Roger Julia | 81.200 | 17th Place; World Class; Semifinalist |
| 2017 | Inside the Ink; Flow & Drip by Key Poulan, Darren Van Derpoel & Bryan Nungaray / "The Sound of Silence" by Paul Simon / Crazy by Willie Nelson / Inside the Ink by Key Poulan, Darren Van Derpoel & Bryan Nungaray | 85.550 | 13th Place; World Class; Semifinalist |
| 2018 | Life Rite After; String Quartet No. 8 in C Minor, Opus 110 (Allegro Molto) by Dmitri Shostakovich / Spiriti by Thomas Doss / True Colors by Tom Kelly & Billy Steinberg | 88.150 | 10th Place; World Class; Finalist |
| 2019 | subTerra; Ritual and Discovery by Key Poulan & Ike Jackson / On the Shoulders of Giants by Peter Graham / Truman Sleeps (from The Truman Show) by Philip Glass / Allure by Key Poulan / Run, Boy, Run by Yoann Lemoine & Ambroise Willaume / Sacrifice by Key Poulan & Ike Jackson | 89.300 | 10th Place; World Class; Finalist |
| 2020 | Season canceled due to the COVID-19 pandemic | | |
| 2021 | Beyond the Canvas; In The Air Tonight by Phil Collins / Stand Up by Cynthia Erivo & Joshuah Brian Campbell / Original Music by Key Poulan, Bryan Harmsen, Ben Pyles & Andy Filipiak | No scored competitions | |
| 2022 | The Otherside; Another Brick in the Wall Pt 2 by Pink Floyd / Otherside by Avi Kaplan / The Wall, The Revolution, The Disintegration & The Triumph by Key Poulan, Bryan Harmsen, Ben Pyles & Andy Filipiak | 90.013 | 10th Place; World Class; Finalist |
| 2023 | Sinnerman; Sinnerman by Nina Simone / Take Me to Church by Hozier / Smile by Nat King Cole / Swing Symphony, Mvt. 4 by Wynton Marsalis / Présage by Univers Zero / I'm Tired by Labrinth & Zendaya | 93.775 | 6th Place; World Class; Finalist |
| 2024 | Vieux Carré; The Jungle & All Rise by Wynton Marsalis / I Put a Spell on You by Nina Simone / Agape by Nicholas Britell / In the Sweet By and By by Joseph Webster & S. Filmore Bennett / Lie to Me by Trombone Shorty, Chris Seefreid & Stefan Abingdon | 92.150 | 7th Place; World Class; Finalist |
| 2025 | If I Must Fall... Passages by Will Healy / When the Party's Over by Finneas Baird O'Connell / Who Cares 2 by Louis Cole | 92.825 | 7th Place; World Class; Finalist |
| 2026 | Corps inactive | | |
