= Spartans Drum and Bugle Corps =

Junior drum and bugle corps based in Nashua, New Hampshire

- Location: Nashua, New Hampshire
- Division: World Class
- Founded: 1955
- Executive Director: Paul LaFlamme
- Championship titles: DCI Open Class; 1997; 1998; 2004; 2005; 2007; 2019; 2023; 2024; 2025
- Website: www.spartansdbc.org

The Spartans Drum and Bugle Corps is a World Class competitive junior drum and bugle corps. Based in Nashua, New Hampshire, the Spartans performs in Drum Corps International (DCI) competitions. The Spartans won the DCI Division II World Championship in 1997, 1998, 2004, 2005, 2007, and in 2019, 2023, 2024, and 2025 won the DCI Open Class Championship that replaced Divisions II and III (a change made to the divisions in 2008).

== History ==
The Spartans Drum and Bugle Corps was founded in 1955 by Albert LaFlamme. LaFlamme was succeeded as corps director by his son, Peter. Today, the corps is run by Albert's grandson, Paul LaFlamme.

A fire in 1999 destroyed nearly everything the corps owned: instruments, uniforms, equipment, vehicles. The dedication of the corps' members, staff, and supporters, as well as the greater drum corps community, kept the corps in operation and in competition, with the corps placing second that year at DCI Division II Finals in Madison, Wisconsin.

Despite being DCI Division II Champions five times, in 2009 the economic downturn forced the Spartans into bankruptcy. Bingo revenues had dropped off to a point where the corps discontinued that fundraising activity. Efforts to sell the corps hall had not been successful. The corps went through a year of inactivity and reorganized, including a change of management and sale of the corps hall. The corps then successfully returned to competition in 2010.

=== Return to Competition ===
Since returning to the DCI competition field in 2010, the Spartans never placed outside the top 5 when competing the in the Open Class World championship. The corps has also qualified for World Class semi finals consecutively since 2012, regularly finishing above a number of World Class corps.

In 2019, ten years after the corps went inactive, the Spartans were crowned the champions of the 2019 DCI Open Class World Championship with a score of 81.050. They were also the only corps to go undefeated throughout the regular season before world finals week. This was repeated in 2023 and 2024 when the Spartans were consecutively crowned undefeated Open Class World Champions.

In 2025, after two undefeated seasons in a row, the Spartans announced their intent to transition to DCI's World Class for the 2026 season and beyond. They were the first corps to undergo a hybrid classification structure, for the 2025 season. They competed in eight World Class shows. They finished the season as Open Class World Champions, for a 3rd year in a row as well as placing 18th in the World, ahead of 3 World Class Corps.

The Spartans were selected to march in the 99th Macy's Thanksgiving Day Parade taking place on November 27th, 2025.

On September 26th 2025, the Spartans were approved by the board of DCI for World Class membership. They made their World Class debut on 29th June 2026 at DCI Lawrence, MA.

== Show summary (1972–2026) ==
Key
Light blue background indicates DCI Open Class Finalist (Note: From 1986–1991, the Spartans competed in Class A, from 1992–2007 in Division II, and have competed since 2008 in Open Class. These are the same tier, just renamed.)
Goldenrod background indicates DCI Open Class Champion
Pale green background indicates DCI World Class Semifinalist (Note: From 1997–2001, the Spartans also competed at the Division I championships, and since 2011 at the World Class championships. These are the same competition, just renamed.)

| Year | Repertoire | World Championships | |
| Year | Repertoire | Score | Placement |
|---|---|---|---|
| 1972 | Parade of the Charioteers (from Ben Hur) by Miklós Rózsa / Miami Beach / Colour My World & To Be Free by James Pankow / Miserlou (Traditional), adapted by Nicholas Roubanis / Love Theme (from Ben-Hur) by Miklós Rózsa | Did not attend World Championships | |
| 1973 | Entrance to Sparta & Nonename by Albert LaFlamme / Soul Explosion by Gladys Bruce / Lover Man (Oh, Where Can You Be?) by Jimmy Davis, Ram Ramirez & James Sherman / Air Mail Special by Benny Goodman, James Mundy & Charlie Christian / Miserlou (Traditional), adapted by Nicholas Roubanis / Love Theme (from Ben-Hur) by Miklós Rózsa | Did not attend World Championships | |
| 1974 | St. Louis Blues March by W. C. Handy, adapted my Glenn Miller / 2nd Hungarian Rhapsody by Franz Liszt / Moonlight Serenade by Glenn Miller & Mitchell Parish / Sing, Sing, Sing (With a Swing) by Louis Prima / Bésame Mucho by Consuelo Velázquez & Sunny Skylar / Love Theme (from Ben-Hur) by Miklós Rózsa / Basin Street Blues by Spencer Williams | Did not attend World Championships | |
| 1975 | 2nd Hungarian Rhapsody by Franz Liszt / Finlandia by Jean Sibelius / Boys and Girls Get Together by Jim Peterik / Miserlou (Traditional), adapted by Nicholas Roubanis / Sunrise, Sunset by Jerry Bock & Sheldon Harnick / Hang 'em High by Dominic Frontiere | Did not attend World Championships | |
| 1976 | 2nd Hungarian Rhapsody by Franz Liszt / Hallelujah Chorus by George Frideric Handel / Two Minds Meet by L. Raub & Bill Chase / Poet and Peasant Overture by Franz von Suppé / Finale (from Firebird Suite) by Igor Stravinsky | Did not attend World Championships | |
| 1977 | Flying Home by Benny Goodman, Eddie DeLange, Lionel Hampton & Sydney Robin / Parade of the Charioteers (from Ben-Hur) by Miklós Rózsa / Hallelujah Chorus by George Frideric Handel / Ol' Man River (from Showboat) by Jerome Kern & Oscar Hammerstein II / Poet and Peasant Overture by Franz von Suppé / Lover Man (Oh, Where Can You Be?) by Jimmy Davis, Ram Ramirez & James Sherman / Live and Let Live by Cole Porter | Did not attend World Championships | |
| 1978 | Compendium / Chump Change (from The New Bill Cosby Show) by Bill Cosby & Quincy Jones / A Day in the Life by Lennon–McCartney / Instant Concert by James Swearingen / Rhapsody in Blue by George Gershwin / Love Theme (from Ben-Hur) by Miklós Rózsa / Hang 'em High by Dominic Frontiere | Did not attend World Championships | |
| 1979 | Favourite Things / William Tell Overture by Gioachino Rossini / Sun Shower by Chuck Mangione / Night Journey by Doc Severinsen, Ernie Chapman & Fred Crane / Hill Where the Lord Hides by Chuck Mangione / Percussion Overture / Pegasus by Hank Levy | Did not attend World Championships | |
| 1980–85 | No information available | Did not attend World Championships | |
| 1986 | Repertoire unavailable | 67.900 | 8th Place; Class A |
| 1987 | Repertoire unavailable | 70.400 | 5th Place; Class A |
| 1988 | Liberty Mission (Unknown) / Carmen by Georges Bizet / I Have Dreamed (from The King and I) by Rodgers and Hammerstein / Poet and Peasant Overture by Franz von Suppé | 71.900 | 12th Place; Class A |
| 1989 | Camelot; Overture, Parade, Guenevere, What Do the Simple Folk Do? & Before I Gaze at You Again; All from Camelot by Frederick Loewe & Alan Jay Lerner | 79.800 | 6th Place; Class A |
| 1990 | Scheherazade; Selections from Scheherazade by Nikolai Rimsky-Korsakov | 76.700 | 7th Place; Class A |
| 1991 | Scheherazade; Selections from Scheherazade by Nikolai Rimsky-Korsakov | 78.500 | 11th Place; Class A |
| 1992 | Hook; Selections from Hook by John Williams | 84.000 | 7th Place; Division II & III; Finalist |
| 1993 | Aladdin; Selections from Aladdin by Alan Menken | 84.900 | 8th Place; Division II |
| 1994 | Emerson, Lake, and Palmer; Music by Keith Emerson, Greg Lake & Carl Palmer | 82.600 | 9th Place; Division II |
| 1995 | Rome: The Eternal City; Ben-Hur by Miklós Rózsa / Bacchanale (from Samson and Delilah) by Camille Saint-Saëns / Roman Festivals & Pines of the Appian Way (from The Pines of Rome) by Ottorino Respighi | 88.800 | 4th Place; Division II; Finalist |
| 1996 | Return to Rome; Inzio (from Ben-Hur) by Miklós Rózsa / Cenotaph by Jack Stamp / Dance of Belkis at Dawn, Dream of King Solomon, War Dance & Orgiastic Dance (from Belkis, Queen of Sheba) by Ottorino Respighi | 89.500 | 4th Place; Division II; Finalist |
| 1997 | Three Revelations; Awakening, Contemplation & Rejoicing by Alfred Reed | 94.200 | 1st Place; Division II; Champion |
| 1997 | Three Revelations; Awakening, Contemplation & Rejoicing by Alfred Reed | 69.800 | 23rd Place; Division I |
| 1998 | Sinfonia Vocci: The Music of David Holsinger; Sinfonia Vocci & Ballet Sacra by David Holsinger | 97.100 | 1st Place; Division II; Champion |
| 1998 | Sinfonia Vocci: The Music of David Holsinger; Sinfonia Vocci & Ballet Sacra by David Holsinger | 73.000 | 22nd Place; Division I |
| 1999 | Easter Symphony; Kings, Deathtree & Symphonia Resurrectus; All from The Easter Symphony by David Holsinger | 95.300 | 2nd Place; Division II; Finalist |
| 1999 | Easter Symphony; Kings, Deathtree & Symphonia Resurrectus; All from The Easter Symphony by David Holsinger | 73.700 | 22nd Place; Division I |
| 2000 | Glorioso; Glorioso, Oratio, Cantus III & Diofestos | 80.750 | 8th Place; Division II |
| 2001 | Gladiator; The Battle & Barbarian Horde (from Gladiator) by Hans Zimmer & Lisa Gerrard / Ben-Hur by Miklós Rózsa | 93.950 | 3rd Place; Division II & III; Finalist |
| 2001 | Gladiator; The Battle & Barbarian Horde (from Gladiator) by Hans Zimmer & Lisa Gerrard / Ben-Hur by Miklós Rózsa | 73.800 | 20th Place; Division I |
| 2002 | Guardians; Music from Gladiator by Hans Zimmer & Lisa Gerrard / Ben-Hur by Miklós Rózsa / Music from The Mummy Returns by Alan Silvestri / Bacchanale (from Samson and Delilah) by Camille Saint-Saëns | 93.900 | 5th Place; Division II & III; Finalist |
| 2003 | The Divine Comedy; Inferno, Ascension, Paradise & Finale; All from The Divine Comedy, Symphony No. 1 by Robert W. Smith | 94.450 | 3rd Place; Division II & III; Finalist |
| 2004 | Medusa; Medusa Lures Poseidon, Athena's Rage, Serpents & The Gorgon's Pursuit; All from Medusa by Key Poulan | 96.325 | 1st Place; Division II & III; Champion |
| 2005 | Vizier; Wisdom, Experience, Conceive, Meditation, Ascendant & Vizier: The All-Seeing Eye; All from Vizier by Key Poulan | 96.275 | 1st Place; Division II & III; Champion |
| 2006 | Advent Rising; Bounty Hunter, Stolen Transport, Glorious Human, Aurelian Conflict & Canyon Encounter; All from Advent Rising by Tommy Tallarico | 94.025 | 3rd Place; Division II & III; Finalist |
| 2007 | Tarot; Fortune Teller; The Emperor and Strength; The Fool; The Magician & The Sun, Death, and Judgment; All from Tarot by Key Poulan, Peter Furnari & Eric Putnam | 96.150 | 1st Place; Division II & III; Champion |
| 2008 | Metallic Soundscapes; Kingfishers Catch Fire, Turning & Turbine by John Mackey | 82.700 | 14th Place; Open Class |
| 2009 | Corps inactive | | |
| 2010 | Fire Dance; Inferno (from The Divine Comedy) by Robert W. Smith / Caronte, Ferryman of Souls; Entrance Into Hell; Interview of Ulysses & La Giudecca (all from Inferno di Dante) by Key Poulan | 93.600 | 3rd Place; Open Class; Finalist |
| 2011 | Midnight; Midnight by Key Poulan / Bella's Lullabye & Other music from Twilight by Carter Burwell | 91.500 | 4th Place; Open Class; Finalist |
| 2011 | Midnight; Midnight by Key Poulan / Bella's Lullabye & Other music from Twilight by Carter Burwell | 69.350 | 26th Place; World Class |
| 2012 | Renewal; Infernal Dance, The Princess Game with the Golden Apples & Dance of the Princesses (from The Firebird Suite) / Dance of the Earth (from The Rite of Spring) / Berceuse & Finale (from The Firebird Suite); All by Igor Stravinsky | 91.150 | 4th Place; Open Class; Finalist |
| 2012 | Renewal; Infernal Dance, The Princess Game with the Golden Apples & Dance of the Princesses (from The Firebird Suite) / Dance of the Earth (from The Rite of Spring) / Berceuse & Finale (from The Firebird Suite); All by Igor Stravinsky | 70.750 | 24th Place; World Class; Semifinalist |
| 2013 | Live Free; Music from Swan Lake by Pyotr Ilyich Tchaikovsky / Music from The Matrix by Don Davis / Naqoyqatsi by Philip Glass | 90.500 | 4th Place; Open Class; Finalist |
| 2013 | Live Free; Music from Swan Lake by Pyotr Ilyich Tchaikovsky / Music from The Matrix by Don Davis / Naqoyqatsi by Philip Glass | 72.850 | 24th Place; World Class; Semifinalist |
| 2014 | Olympus; Olympus Intro by Jeff Boulduc, Matt McGuire & Michael Moore / Symphony for Brass and Percussion, Mvt. II by Alfred Reed / You Are So Beautiful by Bruce Fisher, Billy Preston & Dennis Wilson / Symphony No. 2 Mvt. III & There Will Be Rest by Frank Ticheli | 77.025 | 4th Place; Open Class; Finalist |
| 2014 | Olympus; Olympus Intro by Jeff Boulduc, Matt McGuire & Michael Moore / Symphony for Brass and Percussion, Mvt. II by Alfred Reed / You Are So Beautiful by Bruce Fisher, Billy Preston & Dennis Wilson / Symphony No. 2 Mvt. III & There Will Be Rest by Frank Ticheli | 74.050 | 24th Place; World Class; Semifinalist |
| 2015 | Spartans... At The Gates! Prelude to War – Original music by Key Poulan, Michael Moore & Matt McGuire; Spartan Warrior To Victory – To Victory (from 300) by Tyler Bates; Defending the Gates – Piano Concerto No. 1, 3rd Movement: Toccata Con Fuoco by Keith Emerson; Empyrean Mercenaries – From Trailerhead by Immediate; Battle – The Battle (from Gladiator) by Hans Zimmer & Lisa Gerrard; Glory, Honor & Immortality – Lauds (Praise High Day) by Ron Nelson | 76.025 | 3rd Place; Open Class; Finalist |
| 2015 | Spartans... At The Gates! Prelude to War – Original music by Key Poulan, Michael Moore & Matt McGuire; Spartan Warrior To Victory – To Victory (from 300) by Tyler Bates; Defending the Gates – Piano Concerto No. 1, 3rd Movement: Toccata Con Fuoco by Keith Emerson; Empyrean Mercenaries – From Trailerhead by Immediate; Battle – The Battle (from Gladiator) by Hans Zimmer & Lisa Gerrard; Glory, Honor & Immortality – Lauds (Praise High Day) by Ron Nelson | 71.500 | 23rd Place; World Class; Semifinalist |
| 2016 | Totem; Gabriel's Oboe (from The Mission) by Ennio Morricone / Ome Kayo (from Cirque du Soleil's Totem) by Guy Dubuc & Marc Lessard / Conflict by Key Poulan, Michael Moore & Matt McGuire / Crazy in Love by Beyoncé Knowles, Rich Harrison, Shawn Carter & Eugene Record / Sacrifice by Michael Moore & Matt McGuire / Adiemus Chorale VI (SolFa) by Karl Jenkins | 74.750 | 5th Place; Open Class; Finalist |
| 2016 | Totem; Gabriel's Oboe (from The Mission) by Ennio Morricone / Ome Kayo (from Cirque du Soleil's Totem) by Guy Dubuc & Marc Lessard / Conflict by Key Poulan, Michael Moore & Matt McGuire / Crazy in Love by Beyoncé Knowles, Rich Harrison, Shawn Carter & Eugene Record / Sacrifice by Michael Moore & Matt McGuire / Adiemus Chorale VI (SolFa) by Karl Jenkins | 71.475 | 25th Place; World Class; Semifinalist |
| 2017 | Connected; We Are Here to Connect, Missed Connections, ReConnected & We Are All Connected (all by Key Poulan, Michael Moore & Matt McGuire) / Angel by Sarah McLachlan | 75.925 | 5th Place; Open Class; Finalist |
| 2017 | Connected; We Are Here to Connect, Missed Connections, ReConnected & We Are All Connected (all by Key Poulan, Michael Moore & Matt McGuire) / Angel by Sarah McLachlan | 73.475 | 25th Place; World Class; Semifinalist |
| 2018 | Da Vinci's Workshop; Meet Leonardo & The Vitruvian Man by Key Poulan, Matt McGuire & Michael Moore / Clair de Lune by Claude Debussy, arranged by Key Poulan & Michael Moore / The Workshop by Matt McGuire & Michael Moore / Sogno di Volare by Christopher Tin, arranged by Key Poulan, Matt McGuire & Michael Moore | 75.713 | 5th Place; Open Class; Finalist |
| 2018 | Da Vinci's Workshop; Meet Leonardo & The Vitruvian Man by Key Poulan, Matt McGuire & Michael Moore / Clair de Lune by Claude Debussy, arranged by Key Poulan & Michael Moore / The Workshop by Matt McGuire & Michael Moore / Sogno di Volare by Christopher Tin, arranged by Key Poulan, Matt McGuire & Michael Moore | 74.250 | 25th Place; World Class; Semifinalist |
| 2019 | Experiment X Act I: Balkan Dance by Etienne Crausaz / Egyptic by David Satori, Zoe Jakes, Tommy "Sidecar" Cappel (Beats Antique); Act II: Libertango by Astor Piazzolla; Act III: Shallow by Stefani Germanotta (Lady Gaga), Mark Ronson, Anthony Rossomando & Andrew Wyatt; Act IV: Gretel & Shofukan by Michael League (Snarky Puppy) | 81.050 | 1st Place; Open Class; Champion |
| 2019 | Experiment X Act I: Balkan Dance by Etienne Crausaz / Egyptic by David Satori, Zoe Jakes, Tommy "Sidecar" Cappel (Beats Antique); Act II: Libertango by Astor Piazzolla; Act III: Shallow by Stefani Germanotta (Lady Gaga), Mark Ronson, Anthony Rossomando & Andrew Wyatt; Act IV: Gretel & Shofukan by Michael League (Snarky Puppy) | 80.350 | 19th Place; World Class; Semifinalist |
| 2020 | Season canceled due to the COVID-19 pandemic | | |
| 2021 | Opted out of competition for the season | | |
| 2022 | On the Edge; Act I: Mustard Gas by Casey Crescenzo, Andy Wildrick, Erick Serna, Nick Crescenzo & Nate Patterson (The Dear Hunter); Act II: Backlash by Simon Dobson; Act III: Retrograde by James Blake; Act IV: Spark by Hiromi Uehara, Anthony Jackson & Simon Phillips | 81.025 | 4th Place; Open Class; Finalist |
| 2022 | On the Edge; Act I: Mustard Gas by Casey Crescenzo, Andy Wildrick, Erick Serna, Nick Crescenzo & Nate Patterson (The Dear Hunter); Act II: Backlash by Simon Dobson; Act III: Retrograde by James Blake; Act IV: Spark by Hiromi Uehara, Anthony Jackson & Simon Phillips | 76.600 | 23rd Place; World Class; Semifinalist |
| 2023 | Surreal; Zambra by Ojos de Brujo / Redemption for the Pain Endured by The Dear Hunter / Fables of Faubus by Charles Mingus / Playing God by Polyphia / Tragic Kingdom by No Doubt | 82.263 | 1st Place; Open Class; Champion |
| 2023 | Surreal; Zambra by Ojos de Brujo / Redemption for the Pain Endured by The Dear Hunter / Fables of Faubus by Charles Mingus / Playing God by Polyphia / Tragic Kingdom by No Doubt | 81.275 | 19th Place; World Class; Semifinalist |
| 2024 | Youtopia; Frontier by Holly Herndon / Sweet Release: Church: Renewing Vows by Wynton Marsallis / Alfonso Muskedunder by Todd Terje / What Was I Made For? by Billie Eilish O'Connell & Finneas O'Connell / Air Waltz by Oliver Davis / Original music by Aaron Goldberg, Mark Sachetta, Bryson Teel & Brian | 82.963 | 1st Place; Open Class; Champion |
| 2024 | Youtopia; Frontier by Holly Herndon / Sweet Release: Church: Renewing Vows by Wynton Marsallis / Alfonso Muskedunder by Todd Terje / What Was I Made For? by Billie Eilish O'Connell & Finneas O'Connell / Air Waltz by Oliver Davis / Original music by Aaron Goldberg, Mark Sachetta, Bryson Teel & Brian | 81.525 | 19th Place; World Class; Semifinalist |
| 2025 | Mística; Prologue (from Lady in the Water) by James Newton Howard / Todo Tiende by Ojos de Brujo / I Put A Spell on You by Annie Lennox / Canção Do Mar by Dulce Pontes / Primacy of Number by Philip Glass | 82.150 | 1st Place; Open Class; Champion |
| 2025 | Mística; Prologue (from Lady in the Water) by James Newton Howard / Todo Tiende by Ojos de Brujo / I Put A Spell on You by Annie Lennox / Canção Do Mar by Dulce Pontes / Primacy of Number by Philip Glass | 82.275 | 18th Place; World Class; Semifinalist |
| 2026 | On the World Stage; Carnivàle by Jeff Beal / Grebchestra by Benny Greb / Finding and Believing by Pat Metheny / Young and Beautiful by Lana Del Ray & Rick Nowels / The Greatest Show (from The Greatest Showman) by Benj Pasek, Justin Paul & Ryan Lewis | 80.788 | 19th Place; World Class; Semifinalist |
