= Key Poulan =

American composer

Key Poulan (born 1962) is an American composer and arranger of marching band and concert band works. He studied trombone at East Texas State University, graduating in 1985 with a bachelor's degree in music education. He has written brass arrangements for several drum corps, including the Santa Clara Vanguard, Mandarins, Spirit of Atlanta, Cavaliers, Glassmen, Raiders, Seattle Cascades, and Spartans. He now works at the Clovis North Educational Center writing orchestral music and conducting orchestras. .
