= Raymond Gagnon =

American politician

Member of New Hampshire House of Representatives for Sullivan 5
- In office 2006–2018
- Succeeded by: Walter Stapleton

Personal details
- Born: November 19, 1948 (age 77)
- Party: Democratic

Raymond G. Gagnon (born November 19, 1948) is an American politician. He was a member of the New Hampshire House of Representatives and represented Sullivan 5th district. Gagnon previously served on the Claremont City Council and as the mayor of Claremont, New Hampshire.
