= Richard Amidon =

American politician

Member of the New Hampshire House of Representatives from the Hillsborough 2nd district
- In office 1980–1982
- Preceded by: John B. Corser

Personal details
- Born: November 16, 1927 Worcester, Massachusetts, U.S.
- Died: October 30, 2015 (aged 87)
- Party: Republican
- Education: Worcester Polytechnic Institute

Richard E. Amidon (November 16, 1927 – October 30, 2015) was an American politician. He served as a Republican member for the Hillsborough 2nd district of the New Hampshire House of Representatives.

== Life and career ==
Amidon was born in Worcester, Massachusetts. He served in the United States Army during World War II and attended Worcester Polytechnic Institute obtaining a degree in mechanical engineering. He worked for the New Hampshire Ball Bearings company for twenty three years where he rose to the position of senior vice president.

In 1980, Amidon defeated Robert C. Giesel Jr. in the general election for the Hillsborough 2nd district of the New Hampshire House of Representatives, receiving 830 votes.

In 1982, Amidon ran for the 11th district of the New Hampshire Senate to replace retiring incumbent Arthur Mann. He placed second in the Republican primary election, losing to Jean T. White.

Amidon died on October 30, 2015, at the age of 87 survived by his wife and three daughters. His wife Eleanor Harriett Carleton Amidon, also a former state representative, died just less than a year later on October 12, 2016. Together they had gifted land to extend one of the cemeteries in Hancock, New Hampshire where they had been resident.
