= List of concert band literature =

Set of available musical works for concert band

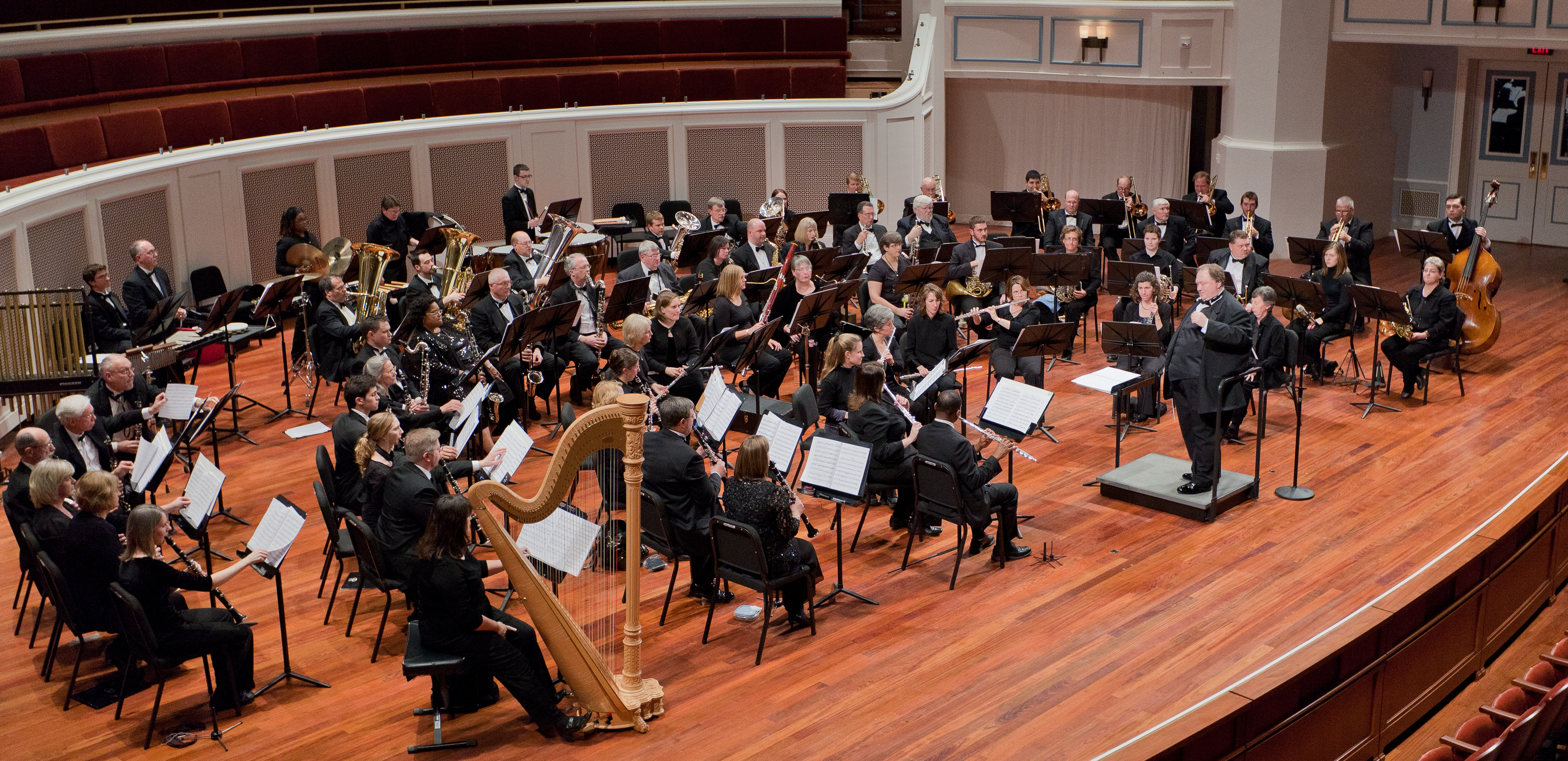
A full concert band—Indiana Wind Symphony in concert, 2014

This is a list of some of the standards of concert band repertoire.

== Original works ==
This is an inclusive list of the accepted standard works written specifically for concert band or wind ensemble.

=== Cornerstone works ===
The following works are some of the most notable standards of concert band repertoire. All have maintained popularity through decades of regular performance, and many, either through an innovative use of the medium or by the fame of their composer, helped establish the wind band as a legitimate, serious performing ensemble.

Kenneth J. Alford (Fred J. Ricketts)

- Colonel Bogey (1914)

Samuel Barber

- Commando March (1943)

Robert Russell Bennett

- Suite of Old American Dances (1949)
- Symphonic Songs for Band (1957)

Hector Berlioz

- Grande symphonie funèbre et triomphale, Op. 15 (1840)

Arthur Bird

- Suite in D major, Op. 29 (1889)

John Barnes Chance

- Elegy (1972)
- Incantation and Dance (1960)
- Symphony No. 2 (1972)
- Variations on a Korean Folk Song (1965)

Aaron Copland

- Emblems (1964)
- Variations on a Shaker Melody (1944/1958)

Ingolf Dahl

- Saxophone Concerto (1948)
- Sinfonietta (1961)

Antonín Dvořák

- Serenade in D minor (1878)

Henry Fillmore

- Americans We (1929)
- The Footlifter (1935)
- His Honor (1933)

Vittorio Giannini

- Variations and Fugue (1967)
- Symphony No. 3 (1958/1961)

Morton Gould

- American Salute (1943)
- Symphony No. 4 (West Point) (1952)

Claudio Grafulla

- Washington Grays (1861)

Percy Grainger

- Irish Tune from County Derry (1918)
- Lincolnshire Posy (1937)
- Country Gardens (1928)

Howard Hanson

- Chorale and Alleluia (1954)

Paul Hindemith

- Symphony in B♭ (1951)

Gustav Holst

- Hammersmith: Prelude and Scherzo, Op. 52 (1930)
- First Suite in E♭ major, Op. 28/1 (1909)
- Second Suite in F major, Op. 28/2 (1911)

Karel Husa

- Music for Prague (1968)
- Apotheosis of This Earth (1971)

Gordon Jacob

- An Original Suite (1928)
- William Byrd Suite (1923)

Joseph Willcox Jenkins

- American Overture for Band, Op. 13 (1956)

David Maslanka

- A Child's Garden of Dreams (1981)

Peter Mennin

- Canzona (1951)

Darius Milhaud

- Suite Française (1944)

Camillo de Nardis

- The Universal Judgment (1878)

Ron Nelson

- Rocky Point Holiday (1966)

W. Francis McBeth

- Masque (1968)

Felix Mendelssohn

- Overture in C major for Wind Band (Ouvertüre für Harmoniemusik) Op. 24 (1824)

Vincent Persichetti

- Divertimento, Op. 42 (1950)
- Psalm for Band, Op. 53 (1953)
- Symphony No. 6, Op. 69 (1956)

Walter Piston

- Tunbridge Fair (1950)

Sergei Prokofiev

- March in B♭ major, Op. 99 (1944)

Alfred Reed

- Armenian Dances (Part I) (1972)
- Armenian Dances (Part II) (1976)
- El Camino Real (1985)
- Russian Christmas Music (1944)

H. Owen Reed

- La Fiesta Mexicana (1949)

Gioachino Rossini

- Scherzo (1863)

Camille Saint-Saëns

- Orient et Occident, Op. 25 (1869)

Arnold Schoenberg

- Theme and Variations, Op. 43a (1943)

William Schuman

- George Washington Bridge (1950)

Joseph Schwantner

- ...and the mountains rising nowhere (1977)

John P. Sousa

- Semper Fidelis (1888)
- Stars and Stripes Forever (1896)
- The Washington Post (1889)

Richard Strauss

- Sonatina No 1 in F major (Aus der Werkstatt eines Invaliden) (1943)

Igor Stravinsky

- Concerto for Piano and Wind Instruments (1924)
- Symphonies of Wind Instruments (1920/rev. 1947)

Carl Teike

- Old Comrades (Alte Kameraden) (1889)

Jaime Texidor

- Amparito Roca (1925)

Clifton Williams

- Symphonic Suite (1957)
- Fanfare and Allegro (1956)
- Symphonic Dance No. 3: Fiesta (1967)

Ralph Vaughan Williams

- English Folk Song Suite (1923)
- Flourish for Wind Band (1939)
- Toccata Marziale (1924)

=== Respected works ===
These pieces may not necessarily be quite as universally acknowledged as the above list, but occupy an extremely important place in the repertoire nonetheless. Like the previous works, they have proven themselves through many performances, most over a span of decades.

David Amram

- King Lear Variations (1966)

James Barnes

- Symphonic Overture (1991)
- Symphony No. 2
- Third Symphony "The Tragic" (1994)
- Fantasy Variations on a Theme by Nicolo Paganini
- Alvamar Overture (1981)

C.L. Barnhouse

- The Battle of Shiloh (1888)

Leslie Bassett

- Concerto Grosso (1982)
- Designs, Images and Textures (1965)
- Lullaby for Kirsten (1985)
- Sounds, Shapes and Symbols (1977)

David Bedford

- Sun Paints Rainbows over the Vast Waves (1982)

Frank Bencriscutto

- Latina (1964)
- Let the Light Shine (1978)

Richard Rodney Bennett

- Morning Music (1986)

Warren Benson

- Concertino for Alto Saxophone and Band (1954)
- The Leaves Are Falling (1963)
- The Passing Bell (1974)
- Recuerdo (1966)
- The Solitary Dancer (1966)
- Symphony for Drums and Wind Orchestra (1963)
- Symphony No. 2, "Lost Songs" (1983)
- Wings (1984)

Jerry Bilik

- Block M (1955)

Eugene Bozza

- Children's Overture (1964)

Houston Bright

- Prelude and Fugue in F minor (1960)

Howard Cable

- Newfoundland Rhapsody (1956)
- Quebec Folk Fantasy (1953)
- Snake Fence Country (1954)

Alfredo Casella

- Introduzione, Corale e Marcia, Op. 57 (1935)

Michael Colgrass

- Winds of Nagual (1985)

John Corigliano

- Gazebo Dances (1973)
- Symphony No. 3 Circus Maximus (2004)

Paul Creston

- Celebration Overture (1955)

James Curnow

- Where Never Lark Or Eagle Flew (1993)

Elliot Del Borgo

- Do Not Go Gentle into that Good Night (1978)

Norman Dello Joio

- Fantasies on a Theme by Haydn (1968)
- Satiric Dances: For a Comedy by Aristrophanes (1975)
- Scenes from the Louvre (1966)
- Variants on a Mediaeval Tune (1963)

Thomas C. Duffy

- Crystals (1985)

Frank Erickson

- Air for Band (1956)
- Toccata for Band (1957)

Paul Fauchet

- Symphony in B−flat (Symphonie pour musique d′harmonie) (1926)

Henry Fillmore

- The Klaxon (1929)
- Military Escort (1928)
- Rolling Thunder (1916)

Luboš Fišer

- Report (1971)

Julius Fučík

- The Florentiner March (1907)

David Gillingham

- Heroes Lost and Fallen (1990)

Edwin Franko Goldman

- On the Mall (1924)

Morton Gould

- Derivations (1956)
- Jericho (1939)

Percy Grainger

- "Children's March: Over the Hills and Far Away" (1918)
- Colonial Song (1928)
- "The Gum-Suckers March" (1928)
- Handel in the Strand (1911)
- Molly on the Shore (1921)
- Shepherd's Hey (1918)

Samuel Hazo

- Arabesque (2008)

Clare Grundman

- Kentucky 1800 (1954)

Kenneth Hesketh

- Masque (1987)

Frigyes Hidas

- Merry Music (1983)

David Holsinger

- In the Spring, at the Time When Kings Go Off to War (1986)
- Liturgical Dances (1981)
- To Tame the Perilous Skies (1992)
- On a Hymnsong of Philip Bliss (1988)

Alan Hovhaness

- Symphony No. 4 (1959)

Karel Husa

- Concerto for Wind Ensemble (1982)

Gordon Jacob

- Music for a Festival (1951)

Robert Jager

- Diamond Variations (1967)
- Esprit De Corps (1984)
- Third Suite (1966)

Tristan Keuris

- Catena (1988)

Karl King

- Barnum and Bailey′s Favorite (1913)
- Broadway One−step, or Two−step (1919)

Boris Kozhevnikov

- Symphony No. 3: Slavyanskaya (1950/rev. 1958)

Robert Kurka

- "The Good Soldier Schweik" Suite (1956)

Elizabeth Maconchy

- Music for Woodwind and Brass (1965)

Martin Mailman

- For precious friends hid in death's dateless night (1988)
- Liturgical Music (1963)

Pascual Marquina

- España Cañi (1921)

David Maslanka

- Symphony No. 4 (1993)

W. Francis McBeth

- Of Sailors and Whales (1990)

Johan de Meij

- Symphony No. 1 The Lord of the Rings (1984–88)
- Symphony No. 2 "The Big Apple" (1993)
- T-Bone Concerto (1996)

Olivier Messiaen

- Et exspecto resurrectionem mortuorum (1964)
- Oiseaux exotiques (1956)

Vaclav Nelhybel

- Antiphonale (1972)
- Festivo (1968)
- Trittico (1965)

Ron Nelson

- Medieval Suite (1983)
- Passacaglia (Homage on B-A-C-H) (1992)

Roger Nixon

- Festival Fanfare March (1971)
- Fiesta del Pacifico (1966)
- Music of Appreciation (1944)

Vincent Persichetti

- Masquerade, Op. 102 (1965)
- Pageant, Op. 59 (1954)
- Parable IX, Op. 121 (1972)

Alfred Reed

- A Festival Prelude (1962)
- "Alleluia! Laudamus Te (1973)"
- First Suite for Band (1976)
- The Hounds of Spring (1980)

Anton Reicha

- Commemoration Symphony (1815)

Ottorino Respighi

- Huntingtower, P. 173 (1932)

Vincent Frank Safranek

- Atlantis (The Lost Continent) Suite in Four Parts (1913)

Florent Schmitt

- Dionysiaques (1913)

Gunther Schuller

- Diptych for Brass Quintet and Concert Band (1964)
- Meditation (1963)
- On Winged Flight (1989)
- Symphony for Brass and Percussion, Op. 16 (1950)
- Symphony No. 3 In Praise of Winds (1981)

Joseph Schwantner

- From a Dark Millennium (1981)

John P. Sousa

- The Thunderer (1889)
- High School Cadets (1890)
- The Fairest of the Fair (1908)
- The Pathfinder of Panama (1915)
- Sabre and Spurs (1918)

Claude T. Smith

- Emperata Overture (1964)
- Festival Variations (1982)
- Flight (1984)
- Incidental Suite (1966)

Philip Sparke

- Jubilee Overture (1983)

Eric Stokes

- The Continental Harp and Band Report (1975)

Richard Strauss

- Festmusik der Stadt Wien (1943)

James Swearingen

- Novena (1980)

Frank Ticheli

- Blue Shades (1996)
- Vesuvius (1997)

Virgil Thomson

- A Solemn Music (1949)

Fisher Tull

- Sketches on a Tudor Psalm (1971)

Clifton Williams

- Caccia and Chorale (1973)
- Dedicatory Overture (1964)
- Symphonic Dance No. 3 Fiesta
- Festival (1962)
- Sinfonians (1960)

Kurt Weill

- Kleine Dreigroschenmusik (1929)

Dana Wilson

- Piece of Mind (1987)

Haydn Wood

- Mannin Veen (1938)

Guy Woolfenden

- Gallimaufry (1983)
- Illyrian Dances (1986)

Ralph Vaughan Williams

- Sea Songs (1923)

John Zdechlik

- Chorale and Shaker Dance (1971)

=== Recent works ===
The following works are rapidly gaining acceptance as standard repertoire. Most have been composed within the last 30 years.

Richard Rodney Bennett

- Concerto for Trumpet and Wind Orchestra (1993)
- The Four Seasons (1991)

Steven Bryant

- Concerto for Wind Ensemble (2007)
- Dusk (2004)
- Ecstatic Waters (2008)

Mark Camphouse

- A Movement for Rosa (1992)

Óscar Navarro

- El Arca de Noe (2005)
- Las Siete Trompetas del Apocalipsis (2011)
- II Concierto para clarinete y banda (2013)
- El Olimpo de los Dioses
- Expedition
- El ilustre marino
- Hispania
- Legacy. Concierto para oboe y banda sinfónica
- Libertadores
- Hell and Heaven. Symphony n.1 for wind band (2019)

Michael Colgrass

- Urban Requiem (1996)

Klaas Coulembier

- Resilience (2015)
- The Garden of Earthly Delights (2018)
- Tramontana (2018)

Greg Danner

- Walls of Zion (1999)
- Critical Speed (2001)
- The Greatest Generation (2009)

Michael Daugherty

- Bells for Stokowski (2001)
- Niagara Falls (1997)

Thierry Deleruyelle

- Fraternity (2016)

Eric Ewazen

- A Hymn for the Lost and the Living (2001)

Aldo Rafael Forte

- Synergy! (1997)

Michael Gandolfi

- Vientos y Tangos (2003)

David Gillingham

- Apocalyptic Dreams (1997)
- Galactic Empires (1998)
- Be Thou My Vision (2000)
- With Heart and Voice (2000)

Julie Giroux

- Culloden (2000)
- No Finer Calling (2007)
- Khan (2008)

Peter Graham

- Harrison's Dream (2001)

Ferrer Ferran

- Comic Overture (2012)
- En un lugar de La Mancha (2003)
- El Misteri del foc (2007)
- Dragut El Pirata (2018)
- La Passió de Crist. Sinfonia n.2 (2001)
- Desert Storm. Symphony n.1 (2000)
- The Colossus. Symphony n.4 (2011)
- The Great Spirity. Symphony n.3 (2005)

Donald Grantham

- Fantasy Variations (1997)
- J'ai été au bal (1995)
- Southern Harmony (1998)
- Baron Cimetière's Mambo (2004)

Edward Gregson

- Celebration (1991)

Samuel Hazo

- Ride (2003)
- Perthshire Majesty (2003)
- Fantasy On A Japanese Folk Song (2008)

John Harbison

- Three City Blocks (1991)

Evan Hause

- Tango Variations (2009)

Kenneth Hesketh

- Diaghilev Dances (2002)

Yasuhide Ito

- Gloriosa (1990)

Scott Lindroth

- Spin Cycle (2001)

John Mackey

- The Frozen Cathedral (2013)
- Kingfishers Catch Fire (2006)
- Redline Tango (2004)
- Aurora Awakes (2009)
- Asphalt Cocktail (2009)
- Hymn to a Blue Hour (2010)
- Wine-Dark Sea (2014)

James MacMillan

- Sowetan Spring (1990)

David Maslanka

- Give Us This Day: Short Symphony for Wind Ensemble (2006)
- Hymn for World Peace (2014)
- Traveler (2003)

Nicholas Maw

- American Games (1991)

Scott McAllister

- Black Dog (for Clarinet & Band, 2003)

Cindy McTee

- Circuits (1990)

Andres Valero

- Dredred (1999)
- Polifemo (2000)
- La Vall de la Murta. Sinfonía n.1 (2002)
- Teogónica. Sinfonía n.2 (2003)

Ron Nelson

- Courtly Airs and Dances (1996)
- Epiphanies (Fanfares and Chorales) (1994)
- Lauds (1991)
- Sonoran Desert Holiday (1994)

Carter Pann

- Slalom (2003)

Marco Pütz

- Derivations (2003)
- Four Sketches (2007)

Steven Reineke

- Symphony No.1, New Day Rising (2007)

Jan Van der Roost

- Suite Provençale (1992)

Rolf Rudin

- The Dream of Oenghus, Op. 37 (1996)

Joseph Schwantner

- In Evening's Stillness (1996)
- Recoil (2004)

Robert Sheldon

- Metroplex (2006)
- Chanteys (2000)
- As a Wind From The North (2006)

Robert W. Smith

- Into the Storm (1993)
- The Divine Comedy (1995)
- The Odyssey
- Twelve Seconds to the Moon (1996)
- Songs of Sailor and Sea (1997)
- Inchon (2001)

Philip Sparke

- Dance Movements (1997)
- Sunrise at Angel's Gate (2001)
- Pittsburgh Overture

Jack Stamp

- Cloudsplitter Fanfare (1999)
- Escapade (2002)
- Gavorkna Fanfare (1990/1)

Steven Stucky

- Funeral Music for Queen Mary (1992)

Omar Thomas

- Come Sunday (2018)

Frank Ticheli

- Amazing Grace (1994)
- An American Elegy (2000)
- Angels in The Architecture (2009)
- Nitro (2006)
- Postcard (1991)
- Symphony No. 2 (2004)

Michael Tippett

- Triumph (1992)

Jess Langston Turner

- Rumpelstilzchen (2009)
- Through the Looking Glass (2008)
- Black Bolt! (2012)
- Concertino Caboclo (2012)
- Bock Fanfares (2013)
- Reanimations (2014)

Dan Welcher

- Zion (1996)
- Circular Marches (1997)

Eric Whitacre

- Cloudburst (2002)
- Equus (2000)
- Ghost Train Triptych (1994)
- Godzilla Eats Las Vegas! (1996)
- October (2000)

Dana Wilson

- Shortcut Home (1998)

Charles Rochester Young

- Tempered Steel (1997)

== Transcriptions ==
There are thousands of transcriptions of pieces from other media (mostly orchestra) available for the concert band; however, some transcriptions are performed so often that they can be said to have achieved a place of their own in the concert band repertoire.

John Adams
Short Ride in a Fast Machine (trans. Lawrence Odom)
Isaac Albéniz
Iberia, Book 1: III. Fête-dieu à Seville (trans. Lucien Cailliet)
Malcolm Arnold
Four Scottish Dances (trans. John Paynter)
Prelude, Siciliano, and Rondo (trans. John Paynter)
Tam o' Shanter Overture (trans. John Paynter)
Johann Sebastian Bach
The Art of Fugue (trans. Kenneth Amis)
Come, Sweet Death (trans. Alfred Reed)
Fantasia in G Major (trans. Goldman / Leist)
Fugue a la Gigue (trans. Gustav Holst)
Jesu, Joy of Man's Desiring (trans. Alfred Reed)
Passacaglia and Fugue in C Minor (trans. Nicholas Falcone or Donald Hunsberger)
Toccata, Adagio, and Fugue in C Major (trans. John Paynter)
Toccata and Fugue in D Minor (trans. Erik W. G. Leidzén or Donald Hunsberger)
Samuel Barber
First Symphony (trans. Guy Duker)
Hector Berlioz
Le corsaire, Op. 21: Overture (trans. Gunther Schuller)
Leonard Bernstein
Overture to "Candide" (trans. Walter Beeler or Clare Grundman)
Slava! A Political Overture (trans. Clare Grundman)
Symphonic Dances from "West Side Story" (trans. Paul Lavender)
Elmer Bernstein
The March from "Stripes"
Johannes Brahms
Academic Festival Overture (trans. Mark Hindsley)
Haydn Variations (trans. Mark Hindsley)
Eric Coates
The Dam Busters March (trans. William J. Duthoit)
Aaron Copland
Down a Country Lane (trans. Merlin Patterson)
El Salón México (trans. Mark Hindsley)
Lincoln Portrait (trans. Walter Beeler)
An Outdoor Overture (trans. Aaron Copland)
Preamble for a Solemn Occasion (trans. Aaron Copland)
Claude Debussy
Préludes, Book 1: X. La cathédrale engloutie (trans. Merlin Patterson)
Antonín Dvořák
Carnival Overture, Op. 92 (trans. Leigh Steiger)
Symphony No. 9 in E Minor, Op. 95, "From the New World": IV. Finale (trans. Mark Hindsley, Erik W. G. Leidzén or Weston Nicholi)
Edward Elgar
Enigma Variations, Op. 36 (trans. Earl Slocum, John Morrison, or Douglas McLain)
George Gershwin
Cuban Overture (trans. Dwayne S. Milburn)
Prelude No. 2 in C Sharp Minor (trans. John Krance)
Rhapsody in Blue (trans. Ferde Grofé, Donald Hunsberger or Tohru Takahashi)
Alberto Ginastera
Estancia Suite, Op. 8a (trans. Donald Patterson)
Percy Grainger
The Warriors (trans. Frank Pappajohn)
Ferde Grofé
Mississippi Suite, "A Journey in Tones" (trans. Don Chown)
W. C. Handy
Saint Louis Blues March (trans. Jerry Gray and Perry Burgett)
Paul Hindemith
Symphonic Metamorphoses on Themes by Carl Maria von Weber (trans. Keith Wilson)
Gustav Holst
Capriccio (trans. John Boyd)
A Moorside Suite (trans. Gordon Jacob or Denis Wright)
The Planets (trans. George Smith probably with the collaboration of the composer, Merlin Patterson)

Charles Ives
Country Band March (trans. James Sinclair)
Fugue in C Minor, from String Quartet No. 1, "From the Salvation Army": I: Chorale (trans. James Sinclair)
Old Home Days (trans. Jonathan Elkus)
Variations on "America" (trans. William Schuman / William Rhoads)
Edward MacDowell
Woodland Sketches, Op. 51 (trans. Frank Winterbottom)
Felix Mendelssohn
Fingal's Cave Overture (trans. Julius Seredy or Frank Winterbottom)
Modest Mussorgsky
Night on Bald Mountain (trans. William Schaefer or Mark Hindsley)
Pictures at an Exhibition (trans. Paul Lavender, Mark Hindsley, Erik W. G. Leidzén or Tohru Takahashi)
Alfred Newman
20th Century Fox Fanfare
Nikolai Rimsky-Korsakov
Procession of the Nobles from "Mlada" (trans. Erik W. G. Leidzén)
Scheherazade (trans. Mark Hindsley)
Ottorino Respighi
The Pines of Rome (trans. Guy Duker or Yoshihiro Kimura)
Richard Rodgers
Victory at Sea Symphonic Scenario (trans. Robert Russell Bennett)
Gioacchino Rossini
Italian in Algiers Overture (trans. Lucien Cailliet)
Tancredi Overture (trans. Leonard Falcone)
William Tell Overture (trans. Erik W. G. Leidzén)
Camille Saint-Saëns
Marche Militaire Française from "Suite Algérienne" (trans. Mayhew Lake or Mark Hindsley)
William Schuman
New England Triptych (1956)
Dmitri Shostakovich
Festive Overture (trans. Donald Hunsberger)
Folk Dances (trans. H. Robert Reynolds)
Galop from "Moscow, Cheryomushki" (trans. Donald Hunsberger)
October (trans. Preston Mitchell)
Jean Sibelius
Finlandia (trans. Lucien Cailliet)
Alan Silvestri
Captain America March
Concert Suite from "The Polar Express" (trans. Jerry Brubaker)
Richard Strauss
Allerseelen, Op. 10, nr. 8 (trans. Albert O. Davis)
Igor Stravinsky
The Firebird Suite (trans. Guy Duker, Thomas Knox, or Lawrence Odom)
Fireworks (trans. Mark Rogers)
Arthur Sullivan/Charles Mackerras
Pineapple Poll (trans. William J. Duthoit)
Franz von Suppé
Light Cavalry Overture (trans. Henry Fillmore)
Pyotr Ilyich Tchaikovsky
1812 Overture (trans. Conway Brown, Yoshihiro Kimura, Mayhew Lake or Mark Williams)
Suite No. 3 in G Major (trans. Frank Winterbottom)
Dance of the Jesters from "The Snow Maiden" (trans. Ray Cramer)
Marche Slave, Op. 31 (trans. L.P. Laurendeau)
Richard Wagner
Elsa's Procession to the Cathedral from "Lohengrin" (trans. Lucien Cailliet)
Prelude to Act III of "Lohengrin" (trans. Mark Hindsley)
"Tannhauser" Overture (trans. Vincent Frank Safranek or John Philip Sousa)
William Walton
Crown Imperial (trans. William J. Duthoit)
Carl Maria von Weber
Invitation to the Dance
Oberon Overture (trans. Mark Hindsley)
John Williams
Hymn to the Fallen (trans. Paul Lavender)
Midway March (trans. Paul Lavender)
Olympic Fanfare and Theme (trans. James Curnow)
Superman March (trans. Paul Lavender)
Giuseppe Verdi
Prelude to Act 1, La Traviata (trans. Leonard Falcone)
Ralph Vaughan Williams
Fantasia on ″Greensleeves″ (trans. Douglas Wagner)

== Recordings of concert band literature ==
The Klavier Wind Recording Project was started in 1989 by Eugene Corporon while he was director of bands at the University of Cincinnati – College-Conservatory of Music. It has helped provide recordings of many of the most important and more recent pieces in the wind band literature. The recording project continues today, having followed Corporon to the University of North Texas. The project continues to this day under the label GIA Publications. Corporon's recordings exist in the form of the Teaching Music Through Performance In Band Series, Windworks Series and Composer's Collections. Still more recordings have been released by The Keystone Winds, conducted by Jack Stamp. The Keystone Winds consists of faculty, alumni and students from Indiana University of Pennsylvania.

Two of the most prominent professional bands are the Dallas Winds, conducted by Jerry Junkin, and the Tokyo Kosei Wind Orchestra, conducted by Takeshi Ooi. Both bands were at one point led by Frederick Fennell who recorded several albums of concert band literature with them.

The French Republican Guard Band, known as Musique de la Garde républicaine and one of the oldest concert bands in the world, has recorded numerous works from the early 1900s.

== See also ==
- List of works commissioned by Kappa Kappa Psi or Tau Beta Sigma – a list of all concert band works commissioned by Kappa Kappa Psi, Tau Beta Sigma, National Honorary Band Fraternity and Sorority, or chapters of either organization.
- Symphonies for concert band
- Heritage of the March recording series

== External resources ==
- BandMusicPDF
- The Wind Repertory Project
- Timothy Reynish, Making it Better: Creating a Wind Repertoire in the UK (2022)
