= Symphonies for concert band =

Prior to the 20th century, only a handful of original symphonies for wind band existed. Symphonies were almost exclusively written for orchestra at the time, but, beginning in the early-mid 20th century, numerous symphonies for concert band began to appear.

There are also numerous orchestral symphonies that have been transcribed for concert band, but those are not included in this article.

Note: 20th and 21st century symphonies labelled with an asterisk (*) are for a smaller band, typically the wind section of the orchestra.

== 18th and 19th centuries ==
François-Joseph Gossec
"Military" Symphony in F (1794)
Louis-Emmanuel Jadin
Symphony in F (1794)
Anton Reicha
Commemoration Symphony (Musique pour célébrer la mémoire des grands hommes) (1815)
Hector Berlioz
Grande symphonie funèbre et triomphale (1840)
Charles Gounod
Petite symphonie pour neuf instruments à vent (1885)

== 1900–1959 ==
Ernst Krenek
Symphony for winds and percussion op. 34 (1924-25)
Paul Fauchet
Symphony in B-flat (Symphonie pour musique d'harmonie） (1926)
Arthur Meulemans
Symphony No. 4 (1935)
Nikolai Myaskovsky
Symphony No. 19 (1939)
Nikos Skalkottas
Classical Symphony (1947)
H. Owen Reed
"La Fiesta Mexicana", A Mexican Folk Song Symphony for Concert Band (1949)
Boris Kozhevnikov
Symphony No. 3, "Slavyanskaya" (1950/rev. 1958)
Paul Hindemith
Symphony in B-flat for Band (1951)
Morton Gould
Symphony No. 4, "West Point" (1952)
Roy Harris
Symphony for Band, "West Point" (1952)
Vincent Persichetti
Symphony No. 6, Op. 69 (1956)
Frank Erickson
Symphony No. 1 for Band (1954 rev 1956)
Symphony No. 2 for Band (1958)
Alan Hovhaness
Symphony No. 4, Op. 165* (1958)
Symphony No. 7, "Nanga Parvat," Op. 178* (1959)
Vittorio Giannini
Symphony No. 3 (1959)

== 1960–1999 ==
James Barnes
Symphony No. 1, Op. 35 (1974)
Second Symphony, Op. 44 (1980-1981)
Third Symphony, Op. 89 (1994)
Warren Benson
Symphony for Drums and Wind Orchestra* (1962)
Symphony No. 2, "Lost Songs" (1983)
Derek Bourgeois
Symphony No. 4 "A Wine Symphony", Op. 58a (1978)
Symphony of Winds, Op. 67 (1980)
Symphony No. 6 "A Cotswold Symphony", Op. 109a (1988)
Andrew Boysen Jr.
Symphony No. 1 (1997)
Symphony No. 2 (1999)
Symphony No. 3 "JFK" (1999)
John Barnes Chance
Symphony No. 2 (1972)
Johan de Meij
Symphony No. 1, "The Lord of the Rings" (1988)
Symphony No. 2, "The Big Apple" (1993)
Martin Ellerby
"Natalis", (Symphony No. 1) (1993)
Symphony for Winds (Symphony No. 2) (1997)
Donald Erb
Symphony for Winds (1995)
Frank William Erickson
Symphony No. 3 (1984)
Nicolas Flagello
Symphony No. 2, "Symphony of the Winds," Op. 63
Nancy Galbraith
Wind Symphony No. 1 (1996)
David Gillingham
Symphony No. 1, "Apocalyptic Dreams" (1995)
Ida Gotkovsky
Symphonie pour quatre-vingt instruments a vent (Symphony for 24 wind instruments)* (1960)
Symphonie pour Orgue & Orchestre d'Harmonie (Symphony for Organ and Concert Band) (1982)
Brillante Symphonie (Brilliant Symphony) (1988-1989)
Alan Hovhaness
Symphony No. 14, "Ararat," Op. 194* (1961)
Symphony No. 20, "Three Journeys to a Holy Mountain," Op. 223 (1969)
Symphony No. 23, "Ani, City of a Thousand and One Cathedrals," Op. 249 (1972)
Symphony No. 53, "Star Dawn" (1983)
Yasuhide Ito
Symphony (1990)
A Jubilee Symphony (1994)
"La Vita", Symphony in 3 Scenes (1998)
Gordon Jacob
Symphony A.D. 78 (1978)
Robert E. Jager
Symphony No. 1 (1964)
Symphony No. 2 (1980)
Serge Lancen
Manhattan Symphony (1961)
Symphonie de Noël (1964)
Mini-symphonie (1967)
Symphonie de l'eau (1984)
Symphonie joyeuse (1993)
Libby Larsen
Short Symphony (1996)
David Maslanka
Symphony No. 2 (1986)
Symphony No. 3 (1991)
Symphony No. 4 (1993)
W. Francis McBeth
"Divergents", A Short Symphony for Symphonic Band, Op. 49 (1969)
Alfred Reed
Symphony No. 2 (1979)
Symphony No. 3 (1988)
Symphony No. 4 (1992)
Symphony No. 5 (1994)
Gunther Schuller
Symphony No. 3, "In Praise of Winds" (1981)
Claude T. Smith
Symphony No. 1 for Band (1977)
Dan Welcher
Symphony No. 3, "Shaker Life" (1997)

== 2000–Present ==
Bert Appermont
Symphony No. 1 "Gilgamesh" (2003)
Symphony No. 2 (2011)
James Barnes
Fifth Symphony, "Phoenix", Op. 110 (2000)
Sixth Symphony, Op. 130 (2008)
Seventh Symphony, "Symphonic Requiem", Op. 135 (2011)
Eighth Symphony, "Symphony for Wangen", Op. 148 (2015)
Jodie Blackshaw
Symphony no. 1 "Leunig's Prayer Book" (2019)
William Bolcom
First Symphony for Band (2008)
Derek Bourgeois
Symphony No. 8 "The Mountains of Mallorca", Op. 184a (2002)
Symphony for William, Op. 212 (2004)
Symphony No. 41 "Sinfonia Andalucia", Op. 261a (2007)
Symphony No. 68 "The Tower of Babel", Op. 316a (2012)
Andrew Boss
Tetelestai (2014)
Franco Cesarini
Symphony No. 1, "The Archangels", Op. 50 (2015)
Symphony No. 2, "Views of Edo" Op.54 (2018)
Symphony No. 3, "Urban Landscapes" Op. 55 (2020)
Nigel Clarke
Symphony No. 1, "A Richer Dust" for Speaker and Wind Orchestra (2014)
John Corigliano
Symphony No. 3, "Circus Maximus" (2004)
Hugh Dixon
Symphony for Concert Band (2006)
Johan de Meij
Symphony No. 3, "Planet Earth" (2006)
Symphony No. 4, "Sinfonie der Lieder (Symphony of Songs)" (2013)
Symphony No. 5, "Return to Middle Earth" (2018)
Martin Ellerby
A Little Symphony of English Carols (Symphony No. 4) (2009)
David Gillingham
Symphony No. 2, "Genesis" (2007)
Julie Giroux
Symphony No. 1, "Culloden" (2000)
Symphony No. 2, "No Finer Calling" (2006)
Symphony No. 3, "A Symphony of Fables" (2006)
Symphony No. 4, "Bookmarks from Japan" (2013)
Symphony No. 5, "Elements" (2017)
Symphony No. 6, "The Blue Marble" (2021)
Symphony No. 7, "Titan" (2024)
Samuel Hazo
"Blessings", Symphony No. 1 (2001-2003)
Yasuhide Ito
Sinfonia Singaporiana (2005)
Matt Klohs
Symphony no. 1 "H20" (2022)
John Mackey
"Wine-Dark Sea", Symphony for Band (2014)
Marcin Masecki
"Victory" ("Zwycięstwo"), Symphony No. 1 (2013)
David Maslanka
Symphony No. 5 (2000)
Symphony No. 7 (2005)
"Give Us This Day", Short Symphony for Wind Ensemble (2006)
Symphony No. 8 (2008)
Symphony No. 9 (2011)
Symphony No. 10 (left unfinished at the composer's death in 2017, completed by his son Matthew Maslanka in 2018)
Francisco José Martínez Gallego
Symphony No. 1, "Kaprekar" (2011)
Jean-François Michel
Symphony No. 1, "Colors of live" (2016)
Steven Reineke
Symphony No. 1, "New Day Rising" (2007)
Robert W. Smith
"The Divine Comedy", Symphony No. 1
"The Odyssey", Symphony No. 2
"Don Quixote", Symphony No. 3 (2008)
Philip Sparke
"Earth, Water, Sun, Wind", Symphony No. 1 (2006)
"A Savannah Symphony", Symphony No. 2 (2012)
"A Colour Symphony", Symphony No. 3 (2014)
James M. Stephenson
Symphony No. 2 (2016)
Frank Ticheli
Symphony No. 2 (2003)
Jess Langston Turner
Symphony No. 1, "If I am to leave..." (2019)
Jan Van der Roost
Sinfonia Hungarica (2001)
Dan Welcher
Symphony No. 4, "American Visionary" (2005)
Judith Lang Zaimont
Symphony for Wind Orchestra in Three Scenes (2003)

== See also ==
- List of concert band literature
