= List of Kappa Kappa Psi or Tau Beta Sigma commissioned works =

The following is a list of concert band works commissioned by or dedicated to Kappa Kappa Psi or Tau Beta Sigma.

Robert Russell Bennett, Symphonic Songs for Band (1957)
Movement 1 of Symphonic Songs for Band, titled "Serenade," performed by the Eastman Wind Ensemble with Frederick Fennell

David Maslanka, Traveler (2003)
Excerpt from Traveler, performed by the North Texas Wind Symphony under the direction of Eugene Migliaro Corporon

In 1947, Kappa Kappa Psi created its first National Intercollegiate Band, a band composed of musicians from universities across the United States. Since 1953, the national chapters of Kappa Kappa Psi and Tau Beta Sigma have commissioned a new work for wind band to be premiered at the National Intercollegiate Band concert. This program was begun under the direction of Grand President Hugh McMillen to add to the wind repertoire. A number of the commissions have garnered national acclaim, including Robert Russell Bennett's Symphonic Songs for Band, commissioned for the 1957 National Intercollegiate Band, and Karel Husa's Concerto for Trumpet and Wind Orchestra, commissioned for the 1973 band.

In the years following the start of the national commissioning program, local chapters have begun to commission new band works themselves. Some of these have also received acclaim, including David Maslanka's Traveler, commissioned by the University of Texas at Arlington chapters of the fraternity and sorority in honor of the retirement of Director of Bands Ray Lichtenwalter.

Between the national Commissioning Program and commissions from individual chapters, many notable band composers have been commissioned, including Jack Stamp, David Gillingham, Julie Giroux, Claude T. Smith, Frank Ticheli and W. Francis McBeth.

== List of works ==
Year	Title of Work	Composer	Commissioning party and Institution	References
1931	Kappa Kappa Psi March	J. DeForest Cline	ΚΚΨ National Chapter	
1933	The March of Kappa Kappa Psi	Joseph O. DeLuca	ΚΚΨ–Omega (University of Arizona)	
1934	Kappa Kappa Psi March	Bohumil Makovsky	ΚΚΨ National Chapter	
1953	Ballet for Band	Don Gillis	ΚΚΨ/ΤΒΣ National Chapters	
1957	Symphonic Songs for Band	Robert Russell Bennett	ΚΚΨ/ΤΒΣ National Chapters	
1959	Prelude and Dance	Paul Creston	ΚΚΨ/ΤΒΣ National Chapters	
1961	National Intercollegiate Band March	Richard Franko Goldman	ΚΚΨ/ΤΒΣ National Chapters	
1963	Symphonic Essays	Clifton Williams	ΚΚΨ/ΤΒΣ National Chapters	
1965	Symphonic Requiem	Václav Nelhýbel	ΚΚΨ/ΤΒΣ National Chapters	
1967	Study in Textures	Gunther Schuller	ΚΚΨ/ΤΒΣ National Chapters	
1969	Songs of Abelard	Norman Dello Joio	ΚΚΨ/ΤΒΣ National Chapters	
1969	Divergents	W. Francis McBeth	ΚΚΨ–Lambda (University of Arkansas); ΤΒΣ–Psi	
1970	Propagula	Robert Linn	ΚΚΨ–Alpha Psi (West Texas A&M University)	
1970	Neologue	Jared Spears	ΚΚΨ–Lambda (University of Arkansas); ΤΒΣ–Psi	
1971	The Seventh Seal	W. Francis McBeth	ΚΚΨ/ΤΒΣ National Chapters	
1971	Tau Beta Sigma March	Donald I. Moore	Ladine Bennett Housholder (ΤΒΣ)	
1973	Concerto for Trumpet and Wind Orchestra	Karel Husa	ΚΚΨ/ΤΒΣ National Chapters	
1973	Overture: Memory of a Friend	Robert Jager	ΚΚΨ–Lambda (University of Arkansas); ΤΒΣ–Psi	
1973	Chronolog	Jared Spears	ΚΚΨ–Epsilon Theta (University of Louisiana at Monroe)	
1973	Dilemmae	William Latham	ΚΚΨ–Alpha Psi (West Texas A&M University)	
1975	Let Us Now Praise Famous Men	Martin Mailman	ΚΚΨ/ΤΒΣ National Chapters	
1976	Reflections On An Old Hymn Tune	Richard Willis	ΚΚΨ–Epsilon Theta (University of Louisiana at Monroe); ΤΒΣ–Delta Sigma	
1976	Dance Variations	John Zdechlik	ΚΚΨ–Gamma Pi (Purdue University)	
1977	Symphony No. 1 for Band	Claude T. Smith	ΚΚΨ/ΤΒΣ National Chapters	
1978	Affirmation and Credo	Claude T. Smith	ΤΒΣ–Delta Rho (Missouri State University)	
1979	Prelude and Double Fugue	Fisher Tull	ΚΚΨ/ΤΒΣ National Chapters	
1979	Rondo Cappricio	John Zdechlik	ΚΚΨ–Beta Gamma (Louisiana State University); ΤΒΣ–Alpha Lambda	
1979	Dance Scene	Michael Hennagin	ΚΚΨ–Epsilon Theta (University of Louisiana at Monroe); ΤΒΣ–Delta Sigma	
1980	Caccia for Band	W. Francis McBeth	ΚΚΨ–Gamma Phi (Stephen F. Austin State University)	
1980	King Ubu	Michael Schelle	ΚΚΨ–Alpha Beta (Butler University); ΤΒΣ–Epsilon	
1981	Chamarita!	Roger Nixon	University of Florida; National Endowment for the Arts	(Note: Chamarita! was commissioned by the University of Florida and the National Endowment for the Arts in honor of the 50th anniversary of the Alpha Eta chapter of Kappa Kappa Psi at the university.)
1981	Cantique and Festival	Jared Spears	ΚΚΨ–Delta Rho (Arkansas State University)	
1981	LUX: Legend of Sankta Lucia	Mary Jeanne van Appledorn	ΚΚΨ/ΤΒΣ National Chapters	
1982	Ferris Fantasy	Harry Dempsey	ΚΚΨ–Delta Omega (Ferris State University); ΤΒΣ–Gamma Pi	
1983	Stars and Stripes Variations	Robert Jager	ΚΚΨ/ΤΒΣ National Chapters	
1983	Century Tower	James Barnes	ΚΚΨ–Alpha Eta (University of Florida); ΤΒΣ–Beta Xi	
1984	Seven Deadly Sins	Robert Xavier Rodriguez	ΚΚΨ–Zeta Kappa (Texas A&M University–Commerce); ΤΒΣ–Epsilon Beta	
1985	Chorale Prelude on a German Folk Tune	James Barnes	ΚΚΨ/ΤΒΣ National Chapters	
1985	Sinfonia Drammatica	Arnold Franchetti	ΚΚΨ–Alpha Beta (Butler University)	
1985	Sinfonia for Winds and Percussion	John Boda	ΚΚΨ–Gamma Nu (Florida State University); ΤΒΣ–Alpha Omega	
1987	Overture Alfresco	Jerry Bilik	ΚΚΨ/ΤΒΣ National Chapters	
1987	Variants on an Ancient Air	James Curnow	ΚΚΨ–Gamma Phi (Stephen F. Austin State University); ΤΒΣ–Beta Zeta	
1987	Sinfonia XV "Ursa Major"	Timothy Broege	ΚΚΨ–Gamma Phi (Stephen F. Austin State University)	
1987	Pagan Dances	James Barnes	ΚΚΨ–Epsilon Beta (University of Central Arkansas)	
1988	In The Spring, at the Time When Kings Go Off to War	David Holsinger	ΚΚΨ–Gamma Phi (Stephen F. Austin State University); ΤΒΣ–Beta Zeta	
1988	Catcher of Shadows	Philip Wilby	ΚΚΨ–Iota Alpha (California State University, Fresno); ΤΒΣ–Eta Omega	
1989	Symphonic Canticle	David Holsinger	ΚΚΨ/ΤΒΣ National Chapters	
1989	Riverwalk	Carl Johnson	ΚΚΨ–Eta Phi (Syracuse University); ΤΒΣ–Eta Alpha	
1989	In Memoriam	David Maslanka	ΚΚΨ–Delta Sigma (University of Texas at Arlington); ΤΒΣ–Gamma Nu	
1989	Athenian Festival	Anne McGinty	ΚΚΨ/ΤΒΣ National Chapters	
1989	Danse Celestiale	Robert Sheldon	ΚΚΨ–Alpha Eta (University of Florida); ΤΒΣ–Beta Xi	
1991	Infinite Horizons	John Cheetham	ΚΚΨ–Alpha Omicron (Texas Tech University)	
1991	Hymn Variants (based on Lasst uns erfreuen [1623])	Alfred Reed	ΚΚΨ/ΤΒΣ National Chapters	
1991	Gaian Visions	Frank Ticheli	ΚΚΨ–Gamma Phi (Stephen F. Austin State University)	
1991	Space Symphony	Julie Giroux	ΚΚΨ–Theta Nu (Northwestern State University)	
1992	Crest of Allegiance	Robert Foster	Elizabeth Ludwig Fennell (ΤΒΣ)	
1992	But God's Own Descent	John White	ΚΚΨ–Alpha Eta (University of Florida); ΤΒΣ–Beta Xi	
1993	Daystar: Symphonic Variations for Wind and Percussion	James Curnow	ΚΚΨ/ΤΒΣ National Chapters	
1995	A Tuning Piece: Songs of Fall and Winter	David Maslanka	ΚΚΨ/ΤΒΣ National Chapters	
1995	Cycles of Moons and Tides	Mary Jeanne van Appledorn	ΤΒΣ–Gamma Tau (University of Central Arkansas)	
1996	A Gathering of Angels	Jared Spears	ΚΚΨ–Epsilon Kappa (Angelo State University)	
1997	Desert Winds	Cynthia Folio	ΚΚΨ–Alpha Epsilon (Temple University)	
1997	Revenge of the Darkseekers!	Stephen Melillo	ΚΚΨ–Theta Alpha (Southwest Texas State University); ΤΒΣ–Eta Epsilon	
1997	Capitan Majesty	Timothy Rhea	ΚΚΨ–Alpha Omicron (Texas Tech University); ΤΒΣ–Beta	
1997	Rondo Jubiloso	John Zdechlik	ΚΚΨ/ΤΒΣ National Chapters	
1997	A Fraternal Prelude	Gary Powell Nash	ΚΚΨ–Eta Gamma (Morgan State University)	
1998	Dark Dreams of a Circus Bandstand	David Williams	ΚΚΨ–Omicron (West Virginia University)	
1999	From This Wilderness...	Roland Barrett	Alan Bonner (ΚΚΨ)	
1999	Unusual Behavior in Ceremonies Involving Drums	Daniel Bukvich	ΚΚΨ/ΤΒΣ National Chapters	
1999	Culloden	Julie Giroux	Alan Bonner (ΚΚΨ/ΤΒΣ)	
2000	Hajj	Stephen Melillo	Consortium: Al Sergel and ΚΚΨ–Kappa Delta (Northwest Missouri State University); Gary Davis and ΚΚΨ–Iota Psi (University of Nebraska at Kearney); James Hudson and ΚΚΨ–Theta Alpha (Texas State University–San Marcos); John Laverty and ΚΚΨ–Eta Phi (Syracuse University); Frank Tracz and ΚΚΨ–Epsilon Pi (Kansas State University); Rod Chesnutt and ΚΚΨ–Epsilon (Mississippi State University); Scott A. Nelson and ΚΚΨ–Kappa Epsilon (Shenandoah University); Jim Kull (St. Charles East High School, Illinois); Steve Panoff (Tallwood High School); Eric Wells (Saint Joseph, Missouri Public Schools)	
2000	Four Maryland Songs	Jack Stamp	ΚΚΨ–Gamma Xi (University of Maryland); ΤΒΣ–Beta Eta	
2000	An American Elegy	Frank Ticheli	ΚΚΨ–Alpha Iota (University of Colorado Boulder)	
2001	Hands of Mercy	Julie Giroux	Donna Beth McCormick (ΤΒΣ)	
2001	Mourning Dances	Timothy Mahr	ΚΚΨ/ΤΒΣ National Chapters	
2001	The Imperceptible Voices Cloaked in Wind	Jerome P. Miskell	ΚΚΨ North Central District Chapter	
2001	To the Summit! (Strive for the Highest)	Robert W. Smith	ΚΚΨ/ΤΒΣ Southeast District Chapters	
2001	From the Mountains	Jay Chattaway	ΚΚΨ–Omicron (West Virginia University)	
2002	High Adventure	Randol Bass	ΤΒΣ–Theta (University of Cincinnati)	
2002	Dances of Nahawand	Scott Meister	ΚΚΨ–Iota Omicron (Appalachian State University)	
2002	Dakota	M.J. Cotton	ΚΚΨ–Kappa Mu (University of Georgia)	
2002	Cloudless Day, Bitter Sky	Donald Grantham	ΚΚΨ–Epsilon Kappa (Angelo State University); ΤΒΣ–Delta Tau	
2002	Jacob's Ladder	Paul Richards	Consortium: ΚΚΨ/ΤΒΣ Midwest District Chapters; John Laverty (Syracuse University); David Waybright (University of Florida); James Keene (University of Illinois at Urbana–Champaign); Michael Haithcock (University of Michigan); Thomas Leslie (University of Nevada, Las Vegas); Rod Chesnutt (University of Northern Iowa); John Locke (University of North Carolina at Greensboro); Rich Bergman (Herndon High School); Dick Clardy (Klein High School); Daniel Wood (Seminole High School); Kevin Ford (Tarpon Springs High School)	
2002	Come, memory ...	Donald Grantham	ΚΚΨ/ΤΒΣ National Chapters	
2002	Into the Solitude	Katherine Murdock	ΤΒΣ–Alpha Mu (Wichita State University)	
2003	Caccia	Reber Clark	ΚΚΨ–Delta Delta (Arkansas Tech University); ΤΒΣ–Beta Nu	
2003	Vigor	Sean O'Loughlin	ΚΚΨ–Gamma Kappa (Northern Arizona University)	
2003	Colors Aloft	Daniel Godfrey	ΚΚΨ–Gamma Nu (Florida State University)	
2003	Ebullience	Stephen Lias	ΚΚΨ–Gamma Phi (Stephen F. Austin State University)	
2003	Morning Song	Philip Sparke	ΚΚΨ–Beta Kappa (Bowling Green State University); ΤΒΣ–Alpha Xi	
2003	Traveler	David Maslanka	ΚΚΨ–Delta Sigma (University of Texas at Arlington); ΤΒΣ–Gamma Nu; University of Texas at Arlington Band Alumni Association	
2003	Bandancing	Jack Stamp	ΚΚΨ/ΤΒΣ National Chapters	
2005	Fanatic Fanfare	Paul Richards	ΚΚΨ–Alpha Eta (University of Florida)	
2005	Fantasia for Band	Nolan Schmit	ΚΚΨ–Epsilon Omega (University of Nebraska–Lincoln)	
2005	The Seasons	Philip Sparke	ΚΚΨ/ΤΒΣ National Chapters	
2006	Home Again	Brian Biddle	ΚΚΨ–Alpha Beta (Butler University)	
2006	Husaria Cavalry Overture	Julie Giroux	ΚΚΨ–Omicron (West Virginia University)	
2006	Ancient Irish Hymn	Sean O'Loughlin	ΚΚΨ–Eta Phi (Syracuse University); ΤΒΣ–Eta Alpha	
2007	Variations and Fugue on How Firm a Foundation	Stephen Emmons	ΚΚΨ–Epsilon Kappa (Angelo State University); ΤΒΣ–Delta Tau	
2007	Dream	Adam F. Brennan	ΤΒΣ–Gamma Chi (Mansfield University)	
2007	Celestial Dancers	Eric Ewazen	ΚΚΨ/ΤΒΣ National Chapters	
2007	Mansions of Glory	David Gillingham	ΚΚΨ–Lambda Epsilon (Ouachita Baptist University); ΤΒΣ–Theta Beta	
2007	Purple Heart	David Shaffer	ΚΚΨ–Epsilon Xi (Miami University); ΤΒΣ–Delta Epsilon	
2007	Variations on a Maine Theme	Craig Skeffington	ΚΚΨ–Epsilon Upsilon (University of Maine)	
2008	Concerto for Piano and Wind Ensemble	James Woodward	ΚΚΨ–Alpha Beta (Butler University)	
2008	Fugue with Drums	Joe Nelson	ΚΚΨ–Alpha Psi (West Texas A&M University)	
2008	Loud Sunsets	George Lam	ΚΚΨ–Theta Beta (Boston University)	
2008	Fuse	Rob Smith	ΚΚΨ–Theta Nu (Northwestern State University)	
2009	Two American Canvases	Mark Camphouse	ΚΚΨ/ΤΒΣ National Chapters	
2009	A Century of Opportunity Celebration	Lester Pack	ΚΚΨ–Zeta Zeta (University of Arkansas at Monticello)	
2009	The Gates of the Wonder-World Open	Joseph C. Phillips	ΚΚΨ–Gamma Xi (University of Maryland)	
2009	Concerto for Piano and Wind Orchestra: Solar Traveller	Judith Lang Zaimont	Consortium: Dr. John Boyd and ΚΚΨ–Lambda Lambda (Indiana State University); Dr. Harlan Parker (Peabody Institute); Dr. Nanette Solomon (Slippery Rock University of Pennsylvania); Dr. Craig Kirchhoff (University of Minnesota); Drs. Frank Wickes and Michael Gurt (Louisiana State University); Dr. Mark Scatterday (Eastman School of Music); Dr. Elizabeth Moak (University of Southern Mississippi); Dr. D. Mark McCoy (Shepherd University)	
2009	A Little Learning is a Dangerous Thing	Eric Honour	ΚΚΨ–Lambda Omega (Northwestern Oklahoma State University)	
2010	HardDrive	Julie Giroux	ΚΚΨ–Iota (Georgia Institute of Technology)	
2010	Always We Begin Again	Patrick Burns	ΚΚΨ–Sigma (Ohio Northern University)	
2010	Back to Old Fairview	Michael Leckrone	ΚΚΨ–Alpha Beta (Butler University)	
2010	Glass Menagerie	Brant Karrick	ΚΚΨ–Beta Rho (University of Toledo)	
2010	Carolina Fantasy	Gordon "Dick" Goodwin	University of South Carolina Music Fraternities: ΚΚΨ–Zeta Chi (University of South Carolina); ΤΒΣ–Epsilon Alpha; ΦΜΑ–Delta Sigma; ΣΑΙ–Theta Chi; USC Band Department	
2011	Movements for Wind Ensemble	Jack Hughes	ΚΚΨ–Gamma Delta (Wayne State College)	
2011	Someday	Zachary J. Friedland	ΚΚΨ–Theta Upsilon (University of Rhode Island)	(Note: Zachary Friedland is a member of the Theta Upsilon chapter; the chapter did not specifically commission this work.)
2011	Repercussions	Adam Gorb	ΚΚΨ/ΤΒΣ National Chapters	
2012	Blue and White Dance	Andrew Boysen Jr.	ΚΚΨ Northeast District Chapter	
2013	Idyll and Whirlwind	Steven Bryant	ΚΚΨ North Central District Consortium: Consortium Leader: ΚΚΨ–Alpha Beta (Butler University); ΚΚΨ–Nu (University of Michigan); ΚΚΨ–Sigma (Ohio Northern University); ΚΚΨ–Alpha Delta (Ohio University); ΚΚΨ–Alpha Zeta (Indiana University); ΚΚΨ–Beta Kappa (Bowling Green State University); ΚΚΨ–Beta Psi (Kent State University); ΚΚΨ–Gamma Pi (Purdue University); ΚΚΨ–Delta Upsilon (Eastern Michigan University); ΚΚΨ–Delta Omega (Ferris State University); ΚΚΨ–Epsilon Xi (Miami University); ΚΚΨ–Zeta Epsilon (Michigan State University); ΚΚΨ–Zeta Lambda (Marshall University); ΚΚΨ–Zeta Omicron (University of Akron); ΚΚΨ–Eta Delta (Eastern Illinois University); ΚΚΨ–Theta Epsilon (University of Kentucky); ΚΚΨ–Theta Zeta (Ashland University); ΚΚΨ–Iota Lambda (University of Mount Union); ΚΚΨ–Kappa Chi (Albion College); ΚΚΨ–Kappa Omega (Northern Kentucky University); ΚΚΨ–Lambda Iota (Tiffin University); ΚΚΨ–Lambda Lambda (Indiana State University); ΚΚΨ–Lambda Tau (Central Michigan University); ΚΚΨ–Lambda Chi (Quincy University); ΚΚΨ–Mu Delta (Western Michigan University); ΚΚΨ–Mu Kappa (Grand Valley State University); ΚΚΨ–Wright State University Colony	
2013	(Redacted)	John Mackey	ΚΚΨ/ΤΒΣ National Chapters	
2013	The Two Rivers	Richard D. Hall	ΚΚΨ -Theta Alpha Chapter	
2015	Of Blood and Stone	Julie Giroux	ΚΚΨ/ΤΒΣ National Chapters	
2017	The Eyes of the World Are upon You	Jennifer Jolley	ΚΚΨ-Alpha Tau (University of Texas at Austin)	
