= Symphony =

Type of extended musical composition

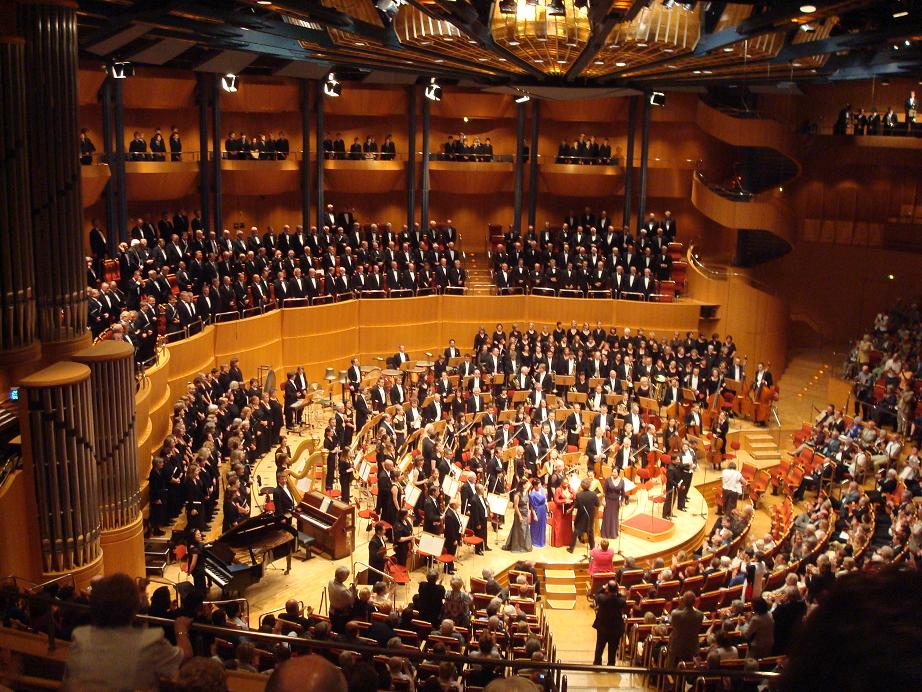
A performance of Gustav Mahler's Eighth Symphony in the Kölner Philharmonie by the Sinfonieorchester Wuppertal conducted by Heinz Walter Florin

A symphony is an extended musical composition in Western classical music, most often for orchestra. Although the term has had many meanings from its origins in ancient Greece, by the late 18th century the word had taken on the meaning common today: a work typically consisting of multiple distinct sections or movements, often three or four, with the first movement in sonata form. Symphonies are almost always scored for an orchestra consisting of a string section (violin, viola, cello, and double bass), brass, woodwind, and percussion instruments which altogether number about 30 to 100 musicians. Symphonies are notated in a musical score, which contains all the instrument parts. Orchestral musicians play from parts which contain just the notated music for their own instrument. Some symphonies also contain vocal parts (e.g., Beethoven's Ninth Symphony, or Mahler's Second Symphony).

== Etymology and origins ==
The word symphony is derived from the Greek word συμφωνία (symphōnía), meaning "agreement or concord of sound", "concert of vocal or instrumental music", from σύμφωνος (sýmphōnos), "harmonious". The word referred to a variety of different concepts before ultimately settling on its current meaning designating a musical form.

In late Greek and medieval theory, the word was used for consonance, as opposed to διαφωνία (diaphōnía), which was the word for "dissonance". In the Middle Ages and later, the Latin form symphonia was used to describe various instruments, especially those capable of producing more than one sound simultaneously. Isidore of Seville was the first to use the word symphonia as the name of a two-headed drum, and from c. 1155 to 1377 the French form symphonie was the name of the organistrum or hurdy-gurdy. In late medieval England, symphony was used in both of these senses, whereas by the 16th century it was equated with the dulcimer. In German, Symphonie was a generic term for spinets and virginals from the late 16th century to the 18th century.

In the sense of "sounding together", the word begins to appear in the titles of some works by 16th- and 17th-century composers including Giovanni Gabrieli's Sacrae symphoniae, and Symphoniae sacrae, liber secundus, published in 1597 and 1615, respectively; Adriano Banchieri's Eclesiastiche sinfonie, dette canzoni in aria francese, per sonare, et cantare, Op. 16, published in 1607; Lodovico Grossi da Viadana's Sinfonie musicali, Op. 18, published in 1610; and Heinrich Schütz's Symphoniae sacrae, Op. 6, and Symphoniarum sacrarum secunda pars, Op. 10, published in 1629 and 1647, respectively. Except for Viadana's collection, which contained purely instrumental and secular music, these were all collections of sacred vocal works, some with instrumental accompaniment.

== Baroque era ==
In the 17th century, for most of the Baroque era, the terms symphony and sinfonia were used for a range of different compositions, including instrumental pieces used in operas, sonatas and concertos—usually part of a larger work. The opera sinfonia, or Italian overture had, by the 18th century, a standard structure of three contrasting movements: fast, slow, fast and dance-like. It is this form that is often considered as the direct forerunner of the orchestral symphony. The terms "overture", "symphony" and "sinfonia" were widely regarded as interchangeable for much of the 18th century.

In the 17th century, pieces scored for large instrumental ensemble did not precisely designate which instruments were to play which parts, as is the practice from the 19th century to the current period. When composers from the 17th century wrote pieces, they expected that these works would be performed by whatever group of musicians were available. To give one example, whereas the bassline in a 19th-century work is scored for cellos, double basses and other specific instruments, in a 17th-century work, a basso continuo part for a sinfonia would not specify which instruments would play the part. A performance of the piece might be done with a basso continuo group as small as a single cello and harpsichord. However, if a bigger budget was available for a performance and a larger sound was required, a basso continuo group might include multiple chord-playing instruments (harpsichord, lute, etc.) and a range of bass instruments, including cello, double bass, bass viol or even a serpent, an early bass wind instrument.

== Galant and classical eras ==
LaRue, Bonds, Walsh, and Wilson write in the second edition of The New Grove Dictionary of Music and Musicians that "the symphony was cultivated with extraordinary intensity" in the 18th century. It played a role in many areas of public life, including church services, but a particularly strong area of support for symphonic performances was the aristocracy. In Vienna, perhaps the most important location in Europe for the composition of symphonies, "literally hundreds of noble families supported musical establishments, generally dividing their time between Vienna and their ancestral estate [elsewhere in the Empire]". Since the normal size of the orchestra at the time was quite small, many of these courtly establishments were capable of performing symphonies. The young Joseph Haydn, taking up his first job as a music director in 1757 for the Morzin family, found that when the Morzin household was in Vienna, his own orchestra was only part of a lively and competitive musical scene, with multiple aristocrats sponsoring concerts with their own ensembles.

LaRue, Bonds, Walsh, and Wilson's article traces the gradual expansion of the symphonic orchestra through the 18th century. At first, symphonies were string symphonies, written in just four parts: first violin, second violin, viola, and bass (the bass line was taken by cello(s), double bass(es) playing the part an octave below, and perhaps also a bassoon). Occasionally the early symphonists even dispensed with the viola part, thus creating three-part symphonies. A basso continuo part including a bassoon together with a harpsichord or other chording instrument was also possible.

The first additions to this simple ensemble were a pair of horns, occasionally a pair of oboes, and then both horns and oboes together. Over the century, other instruments were added to the classical orchestra: flutes (sometimes replacing the oboes), separate parts for bassoons, clarinets, and trumpets and timpani. Works varied in their scoring concerning which of these additional instruments were to appear. The full-scale classical orchestra, deployed at the end of the century for the largest-scale symphonies, has the standard string ensemble mentioned above, pairs of winds (flutes, oboes, clarinets, bassoons), a pair of horns, and timpani. A keyboard continuo instrument (harpsichord or piano) remained an option.

The "Italian" style of symphony, often used as overture and entr'acte in opera houses, became a standard three-movement form: a fast movement, a slow movement, and another fast movement. Over the course of the 18th century it became the custom to write four-movement symphonies, along the lines described in the next paragraph. The three-movement symphony died out slowly; about half of Haydn's first thirty symphonies are in three movements; and for the young Mozart, the three-movement symphony was the norm, perhaps under the influence of his friend Johann Christian Bach. An outstanding late example of the three-movement Classical symphony is Mozart's Prague Symphony, from 1786.

The four-movement form that emerged from this evolution was as follows:

1. An opening sonata or allegro
2. A slow movement, such as andante
3. A minuet or scherzo with trio
4. An allegro, rondo, or sonata

Variations on this layout, like changing the order of the middle movements or adding a slow introduction to the first movement, were common. Haydn, Mozart and their contemporaries restricted their use of the four-movement form to orchestral or multi-instrument chamber music such as quartets, though since Beethoven solo sonatas are as often written in four as in three movements.

The composition of early symphonies was centred on Milan, Vienna, and Mannheim. The Milanese school centred around Giovanni Battista Sammartini and included Antonio Brioschi, Ferdinando Galimberti and Giovanni Battista Lampugnani. Early exponents of the form in Vienna included Georg Christoph Wagenseil, Wenzel Raimund Birck and Georg Matthias Monn, while later significant Viennese composers of symphonies included Johann Baptist Wanhal, Carl Ditters von Dittersdorf and Leopold Hofmann. The Mannheim school included Johann Stamitz.

The most important symphonists of the latter part of the 18th century are Haydn, who wrote at least 106 symphonies over the course of 36 years, and Mozart, with at least 47 symphonies in 24 years.

== Romantic era ==
Beethoven's Symphony No. 5
First movement: Allegro con brio

Second movement: Andante con moto

Third movement: Scherzo. Allegro

Fourth movement: Allegro
Performed by the Skidmore College Orchestra

At the beginning of the 19th century, Beethoven elevated the symphony from an everyday genre produced in large quantities to a supreme form in which composers strove to reach the highest potential of music in just a few works. Beethoven began with two works directly emulating his models Mozart and Haydn, then seven more symphonies, starting with the Third Symphony ("Eroica") that expanded the scope and ambition of the genre. His Symphony No. 5 is perhaps the most famous symphony ever written; its transition from the emotionally stormy C minor opening movement to a triumphant major-key finale provided a model adopted by later symphonists such as Brahms and Mahler. His Symphony No. 6 is a programmatic work, featuring instrumental imitations of bird calls and a storm; and, unconventionally, a fifth movement (symphonies at that time usually had at most four movements). His Symphony No. 9 includes parts for vocal soloists and choir in the last movement, making it a choral symphony.

Of the symphonies by Schubert, two are core repertory items and are frequently performed. Of the Eighth Symphony (1822), Schubert completed only the first two movements; this highly Romantic work is usually called by its nickname "The Unfinished". His last completed symphony, the Ninth (1826) is a massive work in the Classical idiom.

Of the early Romantics, Felix Mendelssohn (five symphonies, plus thirteen string symphonies) and Robert Schumann (four) continued to write symphonies in the classical mould, though using their own musical language. In contrast, Berlioz favored programmatic works, including his "dramatic symphony" Roméo et Juliette, the viola symphony Harold en Italie and the highly original Symphonie fantastique. The latter is also a programme work and has both a march and a waltz and five movements instead of the customary four. His fourth and last symphony, the Grande symphonie funèbre et triomphale (originally titled Symphonie militaire) was composed in 1840 for a 200-piece marching military band, to be performed out of doors, and is an early example of a band symphony. Berlioz later added optional string parts and a choral finale. In 1851, Richard Wagner declared that all of these post-Beethoven symphonies were no more than an epilogue, offering nothing substantially new. Indeed, after Schumann's last symphony, the "Rhenish" composed in 1850, for two decades the Lisztian symphonic poem appeared to have displaced the symphony as the leading form of large-scale instrumental music. However, Liszt also composed two programmatic choral symphonies during this time, Faust and Dante. If the symphony had otherwise been eclipsed, it was not long before it re-emerged in a "second age" in the 1870s and 1880s, with the symphonies by Bruckner, Brahms, Tchaikovsky, Saint-Saëns, Borodin, Dvořák, and Franck—works which largely avoided the programmatic elements of Berlioz and Liszt and dominated the concert repertory for at least a century.

Over the course of the 19th century, composers continued to add to the size of the symphonic orchestra. Around the beginning of the century, a full-scale orchestra would consist of the string section plus pairs of flutes, oboes, clarinets, bassoons, horns, trumpets, and lastly a set of timpani. This is, for instance, the scoring used in Beethoven's symphonies numbered 1, 2, 4, 7, and 8. Trombones, which had previously been confined to church and theater music, came to be added to the symphonic orchestra, notably in Beethoven's 5th, 6th, and 9th symphonies. The combination of bass drum, triangle, and cymbals (sometimes also: piccolo), which 18th-century composers employed as a coloristic effect in so-called "Turkish music", came to be increasingly used during the second half of the 19th century without any such connotations of genre. By the time of Mahler (see below), it was possible for a composer to write a symphony scored for "a veritable compendium of orchestral instruments". In addition to increasing in variety of instruments, 19th-century symphonies were gradually augmented with more string players and more wind parts, so that the orchestra grew substantially in sheer numbers, as concert halls likewise grew.

== Late-Romantic, Modernist and Postmodernist eras ==
Towards the end of the 19th century, Gustav Mahler began writing long, large-scale symphonies that he continued composing into the early 20th century. His Third Symphony, completed in 1896, is one of the longest regularly performed symphonies at around 100 minutes in length for most performances. The Eighth Symphony was composed in 1906 and is nicknamed the "Symphony of a Thousand" because of the large number of voices required to perform the work.

The 20th century saw further diversification in the style and content of works that composers labeled symphonies. Some composers, including Dmitri Shostakovich, Sergei Rachmaninoff, and Carl Nielsen, continued to write in the traditional four-movement form, while other composers took different approaches: Jean Sibelius' Symphony No. 7, his last, is in one movement; Richard Strauss' Alpine Symphony is in one movement split into twenty-two parts, detailing an eleven hour hike through the mountains; and Alan Hovhaness's Symphony No. 9, Saint Vartan—originally Op. 80, changed to Op. 180—composed in 1949–50, is in twenty-four.

A concern with unification of the traditional four-movement symphony into a single, subsuming formal conception had emerged in the late 19th century. This has been called a "two-dimensional symphonic form", and finds its key turning point in Arnold Schoenberg's Chamber Symphony No. 1, Op. 9 (1909), which was followed in the 1920s by other notable single-movement German symphonies, including Kurt Weill's First Symphony (1921), Max Butting's Chamber Symphony, Op. 25 (1923), and Paul Dessau's 1926 Symphony.

Alongside this experimentation, other 20th-century symphonies deliberately attempted to evoke the 18th-century origins of the genre, in terms of form and even musical style, with prominent examples being Sergei Prokofiev's Symphony No. 1 "Classical" of 1916–17 and the Symphony in C by Igor Stravinsky of 1938–40.

There remained, however, certain tendencies. Designating a work a "symphony" still implied a degree of sophistication and seriousness of purpose. The word sinfonietta came into use to designate a work that is shorter, of more modest aims, or "lighter" than a symphony, such as Sergei Prokofiev's Sinfonietta for orchestra.

In addition to those composers listed above, other symphonists from the first half of the twentieth century include Edward Elgar, Bohuslav Martinů, Roger Sessions, William Walton, and Rued Langgaard. The symphonies of this period were "extraordinary in scope, richness, originality, and urgency of expression". One measure of a symphony's significance is how much it reflects contemporaneous ideas about time. Twentieth-century composers who fulfil this measure include Jean Sibelius, Igor Stravinsky, Luciano Berio (in his Sinfonia, 1968–69), Elliott Carter (in his Symphony of Three Orchestras, 1976), and Pelle Gudmundsen-Holmgreen (in Symphony/Antiphony, 1980).

From the mid-20th century into the 21st there has been a resurgence of interest in the symphony with many postmodernist composers adding substantially to the canon, not least in the United Kingdom: Peter Maxwell Davies (10), Robin Holloway (1), David Matthews (9), James MacMillan (5), Peter Seabourne (6), and Philip Sawyers (6). British composer Derek Bourgeois has surpassed the number of symphonies written by Haydn, with 116 symphonies. The greatest number of symphonies to date has been composed by the Finn Leif Segerstam, whose list of works includes 371 symphonies. The four movement Symphony No. 1 "The Ganesha" by Dave Soldier was recorded by the Thai Elephant Orchestra, the largest orchestra by weight, with the fourteen members each weighing up to 10,000 pounds (about 4500 kg).

== Symphonies for concert band ==
Hector Berlioz originally wrote the Grande symphonie funèbre et triomphale for military band in 1840. Anton Reicha had composed his four-movement 'Commemoration' Symphony (also known as Musique pour célébrer la Mémoire des Grands Hommes qui se sont Illustrés au Service de la Nation Française) for large wind ensemble even earlier, in 1815, for ceremonies associated with the reburial of Louis XVI and Marie Antoinette

After those early efforts, few symphonies were written for wind bands until the 20th century when more symphonies were written for concert band than in past centuries. Although examples exist from as early as 1932, the first such symphony of importance is Nikolai Myaskovsky's Symphony No. 19, Op. 46, composed in 1939. Some further examples are Paul Hindemith's Symphony in B-flat for Band, composed in 1951; Morton Gould's Symphony No. 4 "West Point", composed in 1952; Vincent Persichetti's Symphony No. 6, Op. 69, composed in 1956; Vittorio Giannini's Symphony No. 3, composed in 1958; Alan Hovhaness's Symphonies No. 4, Op. 165, No. 7, "Nanga Parvat", Op. 175, No. 14, "Ararat", Op. 194, and No. 23, "Ani", Op. 249, composed in 1958, 1959, 1961, and 1972 respectively; John Barnes Chance's Symphony No. 2, composed in 1972; Alfred Reed's 2nd, 3rd, 4th, and 5th symphonies, composed in 1979, 1988, 1992, and 1994 respectively; eight of the ten numbered symphonies of David Maslanka; six symphonies to date by Julie Giroux (although she is currently working on a seventh); Johan de Meij's Symphony No. 1 "The Lord of the Rings", composed in 1988, and his Symphony No. 2 "The Big Apple", composed in 1993; Yasuhide Ito's Symphony in Three Scenes 'La Vita', composed in 1998, which is his third symphony for wind band; John Corigliano's Symphony No. 3 'Circus Maximus, composed in 2004; Denis Levaillant's PachaMama Symphony, composed in 2014 and 2015, and James M. Stephenson's Symphony No. 2 which was premiered by the United States Marine Band ("The President's Own") and received both the National Band Association's William D. Revelli (2017) and the American Bandmasters Association's Sousa/Ostwald (2018) awards.

== Other modern usages of "symphony" ==
In some forms of English, the word "symphony" is also used to refer to the orchestra, the large ensemble that often performs these works. The word "symphony" appears in the name of many orchestras, for example, the London Symphony Orchestra, the Boston Symphony Orchestra, the St. Louis Symphony, the Houston Symphony, or Miami's New World Symphony. For some orchestras, "(city name) Symphony" provides a shorter version of the full name; for instance, the OED gives "Vancouver Symphony" as a possible abbreviated form of Vancouver Symphony Orchestra. Additionally, in common usage, a person may say they are going out to hear a symphony perform, a reference to the orchestra and not the works on the program. These usages are not common in British English.

== See also ==
- Choral symphony
- Curse of the ninth
- List of symphony composers
- Organ symphony
- Piano symphony
- Symphonies for concert band
