= Flight of Valor =

Flight of Valor is a musical piece written by James Swearingen as a memorial for the victims of United Airlines Flight 93, which crashed in Somerset County, Pennsylvania, during the September 11, 2001, attacks.

It was commissioned in 2002 by the Somerset County Community Band.

The president of the Community Band wanted to commemorate the 15th anniversary of the Band by commissioning an original piece of music. He contacted James Swearingen, the favorite composer of the Community Band's director, to write the piece. When Swearingen realized Somerset's proximity to Shanksville, both thought it fitting to have the piece honor the heroes of United Airlines Flight 93. Without a grant to cover part of the cost, the project was not possible, and so the Somerset Eagles Aerie 1801 and Ladies Auxiliary stepped forward to pay the entire amount. Swearingen agreed to write the piece with enough time for the Band to practice for the one-year anniversary Community Memorial Concert, on the evening of September 12, 2002.
