= Charles Le Thière =

British composer, arranger and flautist

Charles Le Thière (also known as: Le Thiere or le Thière; born: Thomas Wilby Tomkins) (Islington, 1859 – ?, 1929) was a British composer, arranger and flautist. He was the son of a goldsmith and jeweller Thomas William Tomkins and his wife Eliza Tomkins, who had a store and company in Clerkenwell.

== Biography ==
Le Thière is described by Henry Macaulay-Fitzgibbon (1855–1942) in his book The story of the flute (1913) as an extraordinary piccolo player, who also played the flute with lesser success. Also in the book First flute (1968) by Gerald Jackson (1900–?) he is described as a musician without a permanent position who composed or arranged to feed his drinking habits. Despite this, and before he fell on hard times, he composed pieces like L'oiseau du bois and Danse de Satyrs, both for piccolo. He also wrote The Royal Tour for piano solo and his Sunrise on the Mountains and Village Life in the Olden Times were introduced by John Held in the United States in 1890 for his orchestra. Le Thière also arranged the well-known The Punjaub March by Charles Payne (1887) for orchestra and wind band. In an undated letter his address is given as care of Potter & Co, 36-38 West Street, Charing X [Cross], London WC2, in which Le Thiere mentions he is 70 and in the workhouse. For some time he may have lived at 26 Tonman Street, Deansgate, Manchester. Presumably he died in poverty.

== Compositions ==
=== Orchestral works ===
- 1883 Danse de Satyrs, for piccolo and orchestra
- 1883 Danse Irlandaise, characteristic Irish dance for piano and orchestra
- 1886 Feu de Joie, galop for piano and string orchestra
- 1886 Danse Fantastique, for string orchestra
- 1886-1888 Danse des Aborigenes, for string orchestra
- 1887 Gipsy Life, descriptive fantasy
- 1887 Honeymoon Polka, for orchestra
- 1887 L'oiseau du bois - polacca de concert, for piccolo and orchestra
- 1887 Marche Indienne, characteristic piece for orchestra, op. 160
- 1887 Queen of Hearts, gavotte, op. 214
- 1887 Silver birds, for piccolo solo and orchestra
- 1887 Sylvia, scherzo for piccolo solo and orchestra
- 1887 The Merry Prince, polka for orchestra, op. 82
- 1892 Hecla, polka
- 1892 The Rival Lovers, characteristic serenade for orchestra
- 1895 Union - suite des valses, for orchestra
- 1913 Polka de la Reine ..., for piccolo solo and orchestra (or piano)
- 1914 Les Alsaciennes, for clarinet and orchestra (or piano)
- 1915 L'encore, polka for piccolo and orchestra - edited by Carl Hand
- 1915 The Allies, patriotic march for chamber orchestra
- Alvanian, divertissement for clarinet and orchestra
- Amourette, polka
- Le Charme, gavotte for string orchestra
- The Irish guards patrol
- Trilby waltz

=== Works for concert band or brass band ===
- 1883 Belgravia, quick march for concert band
- 1883 Les Cuirassiers, galop for brass band
- 1883 The Gipsy Queen, bolero for concert band
- 1883 The Return home, quick mars
- 1884 Caracalla, quick march for concert band
- 1885 Gipsy Life, for concert band - also edited by Vincent Frank Safranek (1906)
- 1885 Les Alsachiennes, divertissement for clarinet and concert band
- 1885 Lucerne, quick march
- 1885 Romance and Polacca, for clarinet and concert band
- 1885 The Bohemian, bolero for concert band
- 1887 Belle Vue, fantasy for concert band, op. 110
- 1887 Clarions, slow march
- 1887 Clear the Road, galop
- 1887 Eclat, gavotte
- 1887 Elka, quick march
- 1887 Inésilla, quick march
- 1887 L'Oiseau du Bois - polacca de concert, for piccolo and concert band
- 1887 Libua March, for concert band
- 1887 Moonlight in the Forest and Dance of the Nymphs ..., for clarinet and concert band
- 1887 Ramleh, quick march
- 1887 Silver birds, for piccolo solo and concert band
- 1887 The Grenade, quick march for concert band
- 1887 The Merry Prince, for concert band
- 1887 The Royal Guards, quick march, op. 132
- 1887 The Warrior, quick march
- 1887 Theodora, gavotte for clarinet and concert band, op. 78
- 1891 Andalusia, Spanish waltz - edited by Joseph B. Claus
- 1892 Roquefort, quick march for cornet solo and concert band
- 1892 Scherzo brillante, for piccolo and concert band - also in an arrangement for piccolo and drum corps
- 1894 Hommage to Vienna, for concert band
- 1894 Mabel's favorite, for concert band
- 1894 Village Life in the Olden Times, for concert band - edited by John Held and by George Wiegand
- 1900 Mountain life, fantasy for concert band - also arranged by Louis-Philippe Laurendeau
- 1901 Beneath the Window, serenade for oboe and concert band, op. 55 - also arranged for oboe (or cornet, or clarinet or soprano saxophone) by Louis-Philippe Laurendeau
- 1904 Selection from "Gypsy life", for concert band
- 1906 Alicante, for clarinet and concert band - edited by G. H. Reeves
- 1911 Descriptive Fantasia "Roman Life", for concert band
- Almora, divertissement for clarinet and concert band
- Alvanian, divertissement for clarinet and concert band
- Romance and Bolero, for clarinet solo and concert band - edited by W. J. Duthoit, pseudonym of William Henry Duthoit
- Sunrise on the Mountains, for concert band - edited by John Held

=== Vocal music ===
==== Songs ====
- 1883 Chords of Memory, ballad for voice and piano - text: N. Taillefer
- 1887 Love's Adieu, waltz for voice(s) and orchestra, op. 79
- 1902 Jolly Boys at Sea, a nautical polka for voice and piano - text: C. Baron
- 1902 Ragtimemania - Cake Walk des Coons, for voice piano - text: N. Atkins

=== Chamber music ===
- 1882 Nocturne & Gavotte, for flute and piano
- 1884 Romance and Polonaise, for flute and piano
- 1887 Fantasia on Weber's last Valse Op. 104, for clarinet and piano
- 1887 Serenade, for bassoon and piano
- 1887 Sylvia, scherzo for piccolo and piano
- 1887 Falling Stars, polka for piccolo and piano, op. 90
- 1889 Syringa Waltz, for flute and piano
- 1892 Bohemian Dance, for flute and piano
- 1892 Bolero, for flute and piano
- 1892 Tyrolienne, for flute and piano
- 1892 Valse, for flute and piano
- 1896 Two Pieces, for flute and piano
- 1904 Andante and polonaise, for clarinet and piano
- 1912 Californian. Andante and Polonaise, for clarinet and piano
- 1912 Fantasia on airs from William Vincent Wallace's opera "Maritana", for clarinet and piano
- 1913 L'encore, polka for piccolo and piano
- Fantasies on themes from opera, for clarinet and piano
- L'alouette des champs (The sky-lark), polka for piccolo and piano
- L'oiseau du bois - polacca de concert, for piccolo and piano
- Operatic selections, for clarinet and piano
- Romance and polacca, for clarinet and piano
- The Australian, for flute, piccolo and drum

=== Works for piano ===
- 1882 Danse fantastique
- 1884 Egyptian March
- 1884 Danse des Aborigènes
- 1885 Danse de Satyrs, caprice
- 1886 Fleur d'Or, gavotte
- 1887 Danse des Maoris, characteristic dance, op. 45
- 1887 Honeymoon Polka
- 1887 The Royal Guards, Pas redoublé, op. 132
- 1889 Andalucia, Spanish waltz
- 1890 L'Esprit Français..., march-fantasy
- 1901 The Irish Guards Patrol
- 1901 The royal tour, fantasy for piano
- Beautiful Venice, waltz
- Beneath thy window, serenade, op. 55
- Danse Irlandaise, characteristic Irish dance
- Marche Indienne, op. 160
- Maypole dance - English national dance, op. 223
- Sunrise in summer, descriptive fantasy, op. 136
- The return of the boys, march

=== Works for mandolin (orchestra) ===
- 1895 Golden Ensign, polka march for mandolin solo, 2nd mandolin, guitar and piano
- 1896 Dreams of Venice, barcarolle for mandolin solo, 2nd mandolin, guitar and piano

== Publications ==
- Turner's universal tutor for the musette (oboe), London : John Alvey Turner, 1898. 33 p.
- Turner's Universal Tutor for the Cornet ... Arranged by C. Le Thiere, London : John Alvey Turner, 1898.
- Turner's Complete Tutor for the Coach Horn, Post or Tandem Horn, Bugle and Cavalry Trumpet, giving ... a great variety of Road & Military Calls, Arranged by C. Le Thiere, London : John Alvey Turner, 1898.
- Turner's Universal Tutor for the Piccolo, London : John Alvey Turner, 1898.
- Six Original Solos (Turner's Second Album of Six Original Solos) for the Piccolo or Flute, with Pianoforte accompaniments & a separate Piccolo part, composed & arranged by C. Le Thiere, London : John Alvey Turner, 1898–1905.
- How to play the clarinet, London : Dallas, 19??, 38 p.

== Bibliography ==
- Wolfgang Suppan, Armin Suppan: Das Neue Lexikon des Blasmusikwesens, 4. Auflage, Freiburg-Tiengen, Blasmusikverlag Schulz GmbH, 1994, ISBN 3-923058-07-1
- Paul E. Bierley, William H. Rehrig: The heritage encyclopedia of band music : composers and their music, Westerville, Ohio: Integrity Press, 1991, ISBN 0-918048-08-7
- Jean Marie Londeix: 125 ans de musique pour saxophone, répertoire général des oeuvres et des ouvrages d' enseignement pour le saxophone, Paris: Éditions Musicales, 1971. 398 p.
- Gerald Jackson; ed. by Thomas David Simmons, with a foreword by Sir John Barbirolli: First flute, London: Dent, 1968. 147 p., ISBN 978-0-460-03806-5
- H. Macaulay-Fitzgibbon (Henry Macaulay): The story of the flute, London, William Reeves, Bkseller; New York, C. Scribner's Sons, 1914. 291 p.
- Information by Robert Bigio, David Mann and Nigel Slack on the website Dolmetsch Online - Composer Biography
