= Symphonic Songs for Band =

Composition for concert band by Robert Russell Bennett

Composed in 1957, Symphonic Songs for Band is one of Robert Russell Bennett's most famous compositions for wind band. The work was commissioned for the National Intercollegiate Band by Kappa Kappa Psi and Tau Beta Sigma, national honorary band fraternity and sorority, as part of the two organizations' commissioning program. Since its premiere, it has become among the most frequently performed works in the wind band repertoire. It is considered to be a cornerstone of the band literature.

Symphonic Songs is a suite of three movements: Serenade, Spiritual, and Celebration. It was premiered in the Salt Lake Tabernacle in Salt Lake City on August 24, 1957, by the National Intercollegiate Band under the direction of Lieutenant Colonel William F. Santelmann, retired director of the United States Marine Band. The band comprised 112 musicians from Utah, Florida, Maryland, Colorado, Ohio, Texas, Indiana, and New Mexico.

Robert Russell Bennett, Symphonic Songs for Band (1957)
Excerpt from movement 1 of Symphonic Songs for Band, performed by the Eastman Wind Ensemble with Frederick Fennell

== Instrumentation ==
Symphonic Songs is scored for piccolo, flutes 1-2, oboe 1, oboe 2 (dbl. Eng. horn), bassoons 1-2, E♭ clarinet, Solo-1st-2nd-3rd B♭ clarinets, E♭ alto clarinet, B♭ bass clarinet, E♭ alto saxophones 1-2, B♭ tenor saxophone, E♭ baritone saxophone, B♭ trumpets 1-2, Solo-1st-2nd-3rd B♭ cornets, F horns 1-2-3-4, trombones 1-2-3, euphonium, tuba, string bass, drums, and timpani.

== Structure ==
Symphonic Songs are as much a suite of dances or scenes as songs, deriving their name from the tendency of the principal parts to sing out a fairly diatonic tune against whatever rhythm develops in the middle instruments. The Serenade has the feeling of strumming, from which the title is obtained, otherwise it bears little resemblance to the serenades of Mozart. The Spiritual may possibly strike the listener as being unsophisticated enough to justify its title, but in performance this movement sounds far simpler than it is. The Celebration recalls an old-time county fair with cheering throngs (in the woodwinds), a circus act or two, and the inevitable mule race.

— Robert Russell Bennett, program note for Symphonic Songs, Goldman Band 27 July 1958 performance

=== I. Serenade ===
The work opens in 3/8 with a strong hemiola that gives the listener the impression that the work is in 3/4, with two written 3/8 measures to each perceived 3/4 measure. The hemiola abates somewhat when the main melody begins, but is present until the end of the movement. Clarinet, euphonium, trumpet, and trombone are all featured in solos.

=== II. Spiritual ===
The Spiritual is in A–B–A form with a blues-inspired background over which the euphonium, cornet, horn choir, English horn, flute, and piccolo solo. The movement ends with a split-third chord, resulting in a simultaneous major and minor tonality.

=== III. Celebration ===
The work ends with a bright celebration reminiscent of a country fair. Instruments evoke the sounds of the calliope and birdsong, and woodwinds act as the "cheering throngs" at a mule race. The movement ends with a "final thrust of full forces on a suspended high chord" with a "stinger" at the end.

== See also ==
- List of concert band literature
- List of works commissioned by Kappa Kappa Psi or Tau Beta Sigma
