= James Swearingen =

American composer and arranger (born 1947)

Background information
- Born: September 26, 1947 (age 78); Dayton, Ohio
- Occupation: Composer
- Years active: 1947-Present

James Swearingen (born 1947) is an American composer and arranger. He holds a Master’s Degree from the Ohio State University and a Bachelor's degree from Bowling Green State University and is Professor of Music Emeritus, Department Chair of Music Education at Capital University, Columbus, Ohio.

The music he writes is part of a small genre played in American high school band classes as Concert Literature, generally two- to six-minute-long pieces played for high school band concerts. He is a recipient of several ASCAP awards.

== Biography ==
James Swearingen is currently one of several resident composers at Capital University and is also a staff arranger for the Ohio State University Marching Band. Prior to his appointment at Capital in 1987, he spent eighteen years teaching instrumental music in the public schools of central Ohio. His first teaching assignment was in Sunbury, Ohio. He then spent fourteen years as Director of Instrumental Music at Grove City High School, teaching marching, concert and jazz bands.

Swearingen is also a guest conductor, adjudicator and educational clinician in the US and internationally. He has travelled throughout the United States, Japan, Australia, Europe, Canada and The Republic of China.

With over 600 published works, he has written band compositions and arrangements in a variety of musical forms and styles. Many of his pieces, including 81 commissioned works, have been chosen for contest and festival lists. He is a recipient of several ASCAP awards for published compositions and in 1992 was selected as an Accomplished Graduate of the Fine and Performing Arts from Bowling Green State University. Most recently, he received the 2002 Community Music Educator Award given annually by the Columbus Symphony Orchestra. He is a member of the Ohio Music Education Association (OMEA), MENC: The National Association for Music Education, American School Band Directors Association (ASBDA), Phi Beta Mu, Pi Kappa Lambda, and Phi Mu Alpha Sinfonia. In March 2000, he was invited to join the American Bandmasters Association.

== Recordings ==
Several of Swearingen's band compositions have been recorded by The Washington Winds and are available on compact discs from Walking Frog Records. His recordings include In All Its Glory, Exaltation, Panther in the Sky, Celebration For Winds And Percussion, The Light Of Dawn, and the newest release, Flight of Valor.

== Grading Scale ==
According to Swearingen's web site, he grades the difficulty of performing his compositions using the following scale:

- 1 - Easy (for first year beginning bands)
- 2 - Medium Easy (for second and third year bands)
- 3 - Medium (for intermediate or early high school bands)
- 4 - Medium Difficult (for most high school bands)
