= The Divine Comedy (Smith) =

Symphony by Robert W. Smith

- by Robert W. Smith
- Composed: 1995–1997
- Movements: 4

The Divine Comedy is Robert W. Smith’s first complete symphonic band symphony. It was based on Dante's epic the Divine Comedy. Smith had studied this, and Homer’s Odyssey, at Troy.

The classical symphony consists of four movements—each following a distinct pattern:

1. The Inferno
2. Purgatorio
3. The Ascension
4. Paradiso
