= H. Owen Reed =

American classical composer

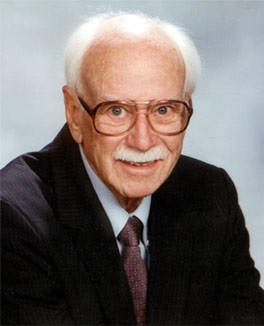
Reed in the 1980s

Herbert Owen Reed (June 17, 1910 – January 6, 2014) was an American composer, conductor, and author.

== Early life and education ==
Reed was raised in rural Odessa, Missouri, where his first exposure to music was his father's playing of the old-time fiddle, accompanied by his mother at the piano.

In addition to his childhood with musically-inclined parents, he was also attracted to the popular piano music of the 1920s, such as the novelty piano tunes of Zez Confrey, and his family's player piano, which played popular tunes. He studied piano with Odessa's only piano teacher, Mrs. Felts, who attempted to interest him in the music of Bach and Beethoven.

In 1937 he enrolled at the Eastman School of Music in Rochester, New York, where he studied composition with Howard Hanson and Bernard Rogers, conducting with Paul White, musicology with Howard Gleason, and music theory with Allen I. McHose. He received a Ph.D. in composition in 1939. In 1942, at the Berkshire Music Center in Tanglewood, Massachusetts, he studied composition with Bohuslav Martinů, and contemporary music with Aaron Copland, Leonard Bernstein and Stanley Chappel. In the summer of 1947, he studied composition with Roy Harris at Colorado Springs, Colorado, and also attended lessons with Arnold Schoenberg.

== Career ==
H. Owen Reed joined the composition faculty of Michigan State College in 1939. His career at MSU lasted for nearly 40 years. Reed retired from MSU in 1976. Upon his retirement, MSU granted the title of Professor Emeritus unto Reed.

Many of Reed's students have gone on to fame as composers and arrangers, including Howard J. Buss, Loris Chobanian, Clare Fischer, David Gillingham, Adolphus Hailstork, and David Maslanka.

=== Compositions ===
Just as Béla Bartók investigated the traditional music of Eastern Europe, North Africa, and Turkey, using these as inspirations for his own original works, Reed similarly devoted much study to the traditional music of North America. Many of his works feature material derived from the Mexican, Native American, Anglo-American and African American cultures, blended with contemporary idioms.

Reed's best known and most widely performed work is the three-movement concert band composition La Fiesta Mexicana (1949), composed with the support of a Guggenheim Fellowship. The work is based on Aztec, Roman Catholic, mariachi, and other music Reed heard while in Mexico City, Cuernavaca, and Chapala, Mexico for six months between 1948 and 1949. He returned to Mexico in 1960 for a month's further study. He also studied folk music in the Caribbean in February 1976, and in Norway in the summer of 1977.

Reed later studied Native American musics in Taos, New Mexico and Arizona, and eventually composed a trilogy of chamber operas based on Native American legends: Earth Trapped (Sioux, 1960), Living Solid Face (Algonquin, 1974), and Butterfly Girl and Mirage Boy (Hopi-Aztec, 1980). His band composition Missouri Shindig (1951) is based on the American fiddle tune "Give the Fiddler a Dram," which his father had particularly enjoyed playing. Spiritual (1947), Reed's first composition for band, is based on his recollection of overhearing the exuberant religious expression of African American churchgoers while passing by their churches as a child.

Reed's music is published by G. Schirmer, Warner Brothers, Ballerbach Music, Harrock Hall Music, Triplo Press, Allyn & Bacon, Boosey & Hawkes, Edwin A. Fleisher, EMI Mills, Neil A. Kjos, Ludwig and H. O. Reed Music.

== Personal life ==
Reed was married twice, for nearly fifty years to Esther, who preceded him in death; and for 31 years to Mary, who traveled the world with him and survived him. He had two daughters, three step-children, fifteen grandchildren, and twenty-two great-grandchildren. Reed was an avid fisherman and world traveler. After starting to play jazz in college, he continued beyond his hundredth year, including membership in a Michigan State faculty combo known as the "Geriatric Six."

=== Writings ===
In addition to his compositions, Reed published eight books on the subjects of musical composition and music theory. His scores, recordings, correspondence, and other papers have been deposited in Michigan State University's Manuscript Collection, in the Special Collections Unit of the Michigan State University Libraries.

== Discography ==
- 2004: The Composer's Voice: H. Owen Reed (Piano)

== Sources ==
- Anon. 2005. "H. Owen Reed Music". Lilaclane.com website. Accessed 12 November 2010.
- H O Reed Music Publications [n.d.]
- James, Richard S. 2001. "Reed, H(erbert) Owen". The New Grove Dictionary of Music and Musicians, second edition, edited by Stanley Sadie and John Tyrrell. London: Macmillan Publishers.
- Michigan State University Libraries. [n.d.] "H. Owen Reed Collection"
- Reed, H. Owen. 2009. "Welcome to the Home Page of H. OWEN REED, Composer Author Conductor". Michigan State University website. Accessed 12 November 2010.
- Steinke, Greg A. 2010. "Greg Steinke, biography Greg A. Steinke: Biography ". Tierra Del Mar Music. Accessed 12 November 2010.
- Syler, James. 2001. "Interview with Dr. H. Owen Reed". Ballerbach.com (July). Accessed 24 August 2009.
