= Erik W. G. Leidzén =

- Born: March 25, 1894; Stockholm, Sweden and Norway
- Died: December 20, 1962 (aged 68) New York City, New York, U.S.
- Occupation: Musician

Erik William Gustav Leidzén (March 25, 1894 – December 20, 1962) was a Swedish musician, known for his compositions and arrangements for concert band and British-style brass bands.

== Early life and education ==
He was born into a Salvation Army family in Stockholm, Sweden and Norway on Easter Sunday, March 25, 1894. He took up the E-flat flugelhorn at age 6 and attended the Royal Swedish Academy of Music, graduating with honors in 1914. He emigrated to the United States in 1915 and continued his association with Salvation Army music there.

== Career ==
He was also known for his association with Edwin Franko Goldman, many of whose works Leidzén transcribed or arranged. His 1955 Concertino has been recorded by Peter Moore with the Tredegar Brass Band, conducted by Ian Porthouse.

He composed piano accompaniments to saxophonist Sigurd Rascher’s 24 Intermezzi, a collection of pieces which are popularly studied by students of the classical saxophone. They were published by Bourne Co. Music Publishers.

He died in New York City on December 20, 1962 shortly after suffering a stroke.
