= Jerry Bilik =

American classical composer

Jerry H. Bilik (born October 7, 1933 in New Rochelle, New York, United States) is an American composer, arranger, songwriter, conductor, and director of stage productions.

Bilik studied with Tibor Serly who had been a student of Béla Bartók. He received a B.M.E. degree and a M.M. degree from the University of Michigan, which counts Bilik among its notable alumni.

Bilik composed Symphony for Band, in 1971, which he dedicated to Serly and published in 1972. He also composed the "M Fanfare."

He has served as Vice President of creative development for Disney on Ice.
