= Vincent Frank Safranek =

Military musician (1867 – 1955)

V.F. Safranek
- Born: Vincent Frank Safranek; March 24, 1867; Bohemia, Austrian Empire
- Died: September 7, 1955 (aged 88) San Diego, California, United States
- Genres: Wind Band
- Occupations: US Army Bandmaster, Composer

Vincent Frank "V.F." Safranek (March 24, 1867 – September 7, 1955) was a Czech American musician.

Safranek emigrated to the United States at an early age. His father John was Chief Musician in the 34th Infantry in 1899. Safranek studied at the Conservatory of Music in Prague.

After graduation he applied for a bandmaster position and was selected for training and sent to the 25th Infantry band at Fort Missoula, Montana. Safranek served in the Spanish American War and World War I. He developed ideas on the concept of the military band and added such instruments as alto and bass clarinets, oboes, French horns and flugelhorns to his band. Previously, many military band arrangements had been designed for brass bands with extra reed parts added in without regard for the ensemble.

As a result of his work combining and balancing the instrumentation of the military band, Safranek became the chief band arranger for the Carl Fischer publishing house. He made contributions to the band repertoires including marches, overtures and novelty numbers. He composed two popular suites for band, the Atlantis (1913) and Don Quixote (1914) suites. In 1916 he published a book on military music, Complete Instructive Manual for Bugle, Trumpet, and Drum, and in 1923 he published another on harmony called Safranek's Guide to Harmony.

Safranek served for 30 years as a U.S. Army bandmaster and retired in 1930 from the army. Although many of his arrangements have disappeared from the band repertoire, his International Peace march medley and Master Melodies remain as classic band works.

== Notable works ==
- Academic Festival Overture (as arranger) (1914)
- Andante Cantabile (as arranger) (/1913)
- Atlantis (1913)
- Cleopatra (as arranger) (1920)
- Don Quixote (1914)
- Finale from Symphony in F minor No 4 (as arranger; ed. Ragsdale) (1878/1912/2004)
- Largo (as arranger) (1893/1912)
- Les Contes d'Hoffmann (as arranger) (1880/1910)
- Poet and Peasant Overture (as arranger) (1845/1911)
- Raymond Overture (as arranger) (1851/1912)
- Roman Carnival Overture (as arranger) (1844/1962)
- Semiramide (as arranger; ed. Robertson) (1823/1939)
- Slavonic Dance No. 3, Op 46 (as arranger) (1878/1912)
- Tannhäuser Overture (as transcriber) (1913)
- Way Down Upon the Swanee Ribber (as arranger) (1914)
- Zampa Overture (as arranger) (1831/1912)
