= David Gillingham =

American contemporary composer (born 1947)

David R. Gillingham (born October 20, 1947) is an American contemporary composer, who is known for his works for concert band and percussion ensemble.

== Biography ==
He attended the University of Wisconsin Oshkosh for his undergraduate degree in Music Education, after which he went to Vietnam where he served in the army, playing in various army bands. After returning to America, he became a band teacher for a few years, before going to Michigan State University for his PhD in Music Composition/Music Theory, after which he pursued a career as a composer while also serving as a university professor. In 1990, his concert band piece Heroes Lost and Fallen, a piece about the Vietnam War, won the International Barlow Composition Contest. He retired as professor of music theory and composition at Central Michigan University in 2016.

== Selected works ==
Some of his recent works which have become very popular in the concert band and percussion repertoire include:

- Paschal Dances (1988)
- Heroes Lost and Fallen (1990)
- Serenade for Winds and Percussion (1990)
- Stained Glass (1992)
- Sacrificial Rite (1993)
- Apocalyptic Dreams (1995)
- Prophecy of the Earth (1995)
- Waking Angels (1996)
- Concertino for Four Percussion and Wind Ensemble (1997)
- A Light Unto the Darkness (1997)
- Quintessence I (1997)
- Galactic Empires (1998)
- Internal Combustion (1999)
- When Speaks the Signal-trumpet Tone (1999)
- Be Thou My Vision (1999)
- Concerto for Percussion Ensemble (1999)
- With Heart and Voice (2000)
- Cantus Laetus (2000)
- Council Oak (2001)
- Concerto for Piano and Percussion Ensemble (2002)
- The Echo Never Fades (2003)
- Concerto for Piano, Percussion and Wind Orchestra (2004)
- Supercell (2005)
- No Shadow of Turning (2005)
- Quintessence II (2006)
- Concerto for Marimba and Wind Ensemble (2006)
- Concerto for Viola, Cello and Orchestra (2007)
- Symphony No. 2 "Genesis" (2008)
- Angels of the Apocalypse (2010)

== See also ==
- List of concert band literature
- List of works commissioned by Kappa Kappa Psi or Tau Beta Sigma
