= Yasuhide Ito =

Japanese composer (born 1960)

- Born: December 7, 1960 (age 65); Hamamatsu, Shizuoka, Japan
- Occupation: composer
- Instrument: Piano

Yasuhide Ito (伊藤 康英, Itō Yasuhide; born December 7, 1960 in Hamamatsu, Japan) is a contemporary Japanese composer.

== Early life ==
As a child, Ito began to cultivate his interest in music by taking piano lessons. He continued to pursue a musical education and, by his third year of high school, had composed his first piece of music for band, titled “On the March”. TRN Music Publisher published this work in 1978.

After high school, Ito attended and graduated with a major in composition from Tokyo National University of Fine Arts and Music (Class of 1986). During his time at Tokyo National University, Ito began to gain national and international acclaim for his work through his entrance in and winning of several musical competitions. Ito's awards include first prize at the Shizuoka Music Competition in 1980 for piano, third prize at the Japan Music Competition in 1982 for piano, an award at the Competition for Saxophone Music in 1987, and the Academy prize from the Band Masters Academic Society of Japan in 1994.

== Musical works ==
Yasuhide Ito has earned much praise for his compositional endeavors. In all, Ito is credited for more than 130 musical works. This collection of musical works includes pieces for wind ensemble, orchestra, instrumental chamber ensembles, solo voice, various solo wind instruments, piano, solo percussion, solo string instruments, and various other instruments such as organ, cembalo, accordion, and harmonica.

Ito is probably most well known as a composer of band music. Among his most popular works for wind ensemble are “Gloriosa” (Gururiyoza), world, and “Festal Scenes”, the piece which with Ito made his United States debut in 1987. This U.S. premiere took place during a joint convention between the American Band Association and the Japanese Band Association in Tennessee. Ito himself conducted the orchestra that premiered his piece.

Other notable pieces for wind ensemble by Ito are “The Symphony” (1990) and “Melodies for Wind Ensemble” (1995), both commissioned specially by the Tokyo Kosei Wind Orchestra. In recent years, Ito has dedicated much of his time and talent to composing vocal music. In the year 2001, Ito debuted his first opera, titled Mr. Cinderella. The opera received much critical acclaim and greatly impacted the followers of the Japanese opera scene.

== Career as a pianist ==
Yasuhide Ito is a composer and pianist. He has performed as a soloist and with other artists. These musicians include Trevor Wye, William Bennett, Steven Mead, Brian Bowman, Toru Miura, and Nobuya Sugawa.

== Career as a conductor ==
As a conductor, Yasuhide Ito has performed with many bands, including the Tokyo Kosei Wind Orchestra in their Asian Concert Tour in 2002, on behalf of Maestro Frederic Fennel. He was scheduled to perform with the Cal Poly Wind Orchestra (part of a music convention for gifted high school musicians) in April 2008.

== Other works ==
Ito's lectures about Japanese band music, given at two WASBE (World Association for Symphonic Bands and Ensembles) conventions, in 1995 and 1997, have been very influential in the world of band music.

Ito is the author of Kangakki no Meikyoku Meienso (The Masterpieces and Great Performances of Wind Instruments) and has translated Frank Erickson's Arranging for Concert Band into Japanese.

Ito is an active member of the Japanese Band Association and the Bandmasters Academic Society of Japan. He lectures at music conservatories in Japan on a regular basis.
