= Jess Langston Turner =

American composer (born 1983)

Jess Langston Turner (born 1983) is an American composer, who is known primarily for his concert band and choir music.

== Biography ==
Jess Langston Turner was born in Greenville, South Carolina in 1983, the son of Dan and Jamie Langston Turner, professors at Bob Jones University. He took piano lessons at age 8, and trumpet at age 11. He attended Bob Jones University, where he took bachelor's and master's degrees in trumpet performance. He then moved on to the University of Hartford, where he earned a master's in musical composition. In 2015 he completed a doctorate in composition from Indiana University.

== Awards ==
Jess Langston Turner's compositions have won many awards. As a college student, his Sonata for Trumpet and Piano won the MTNA Young Artist Composition Award. His choral piece All This Night won the John Ness Beck award in 2007, finishing in first place among unpublished works. After being published in 2008, it also won the Roger Wagner International Choral Composition Contest in 2009. His band piece Rumpelstilzchen won the 2010 Walter Beeler Prize for Wind Composition. His concert band music has been well received by the band community.

== Recordings ==
Jess Langston Turner's music has been recorded on five occasions, all by concert bands. Rumplestilzchen was recorded by the North Texas Wind Symphony and the Hartt School Wind Ensemble, the latter of which was released by Naxos; the West Chester University Wind Ensemble recorded him twice: Through the Looking Glass, on their album "Borrowed Inspirations" (2013), and Reanimations on their album "Reanimations" (2015); and the University of Louisville Wind Symphony, which also recorded Through the Looking Glass in 2017 for the American Bandmasters Association National Convention.

== Compositions ==
Jess Langston Turner's music has been published through Hinshaw Music, Carl Fischer Music, HAFABRA, Pinner Publications, and Jantz Music.

=== Orchestra ===
- Fantasia on "Jefferson," for string orchestra and percussion
- Memorial to Silent Voices, for five-part mixed choir and orchestra
  1. Lacrimosa (attacca)
  2. Kyrie
  3. Lullaby "All Through the Night"
  4. Lux Aeterna

=== Concert band ===
- The King of Love My Shepherd Is (2007)
- Through the Looking Glass (2008)
- Like a River Glorious (2008) for French horn solo and wind band
- Rumpelstilzchen (2009)
  1. Spinning Straw into Gold
  2. Night (The Maiden's Lament)
  3. Rumpelstilzchen's Furiant (Moto Perpetuo)
- Agua Nocturna (2010)
- He Who Would Valiant Be (2010)
- Lullaby "All Through the Night" from "Memorial to Silent Voices" (2010)
- Reanimations (2014) for two trumpets and wind band
- Nothing to Fear, Nothing to Doubt (2016)
- Dancefares (2016)

=== Choir ===
- All This Night (2007)
- Three Spirituals (2010)
- Spirituals (2011)
- Oft I did Marie (2015)
- April is in my Misstriss' Face (2015)
- Final Breaths (2015)

=== Solo voice ===
- Thirteen Ways of Looking at a Blackbird (2006), for alto and piano
- I Carry Your Heart (2008), for soprano, flugelhorn, and piano

=== Chamber music ===
- Sonata for Trumpet and Piano (2005)
- And Can It Be (2009)
- Lacrimosa (2009), for five bayans (accordions)
- Last Dance of Prospero (2009) for horn quartet
- Paeans (2009) for brass quintet
- Urban Etudes (2009)
- Burning Music (2011)
- Nocturne under a Red Moon (2013)
