= James Curnow =

American composer (born 1943)

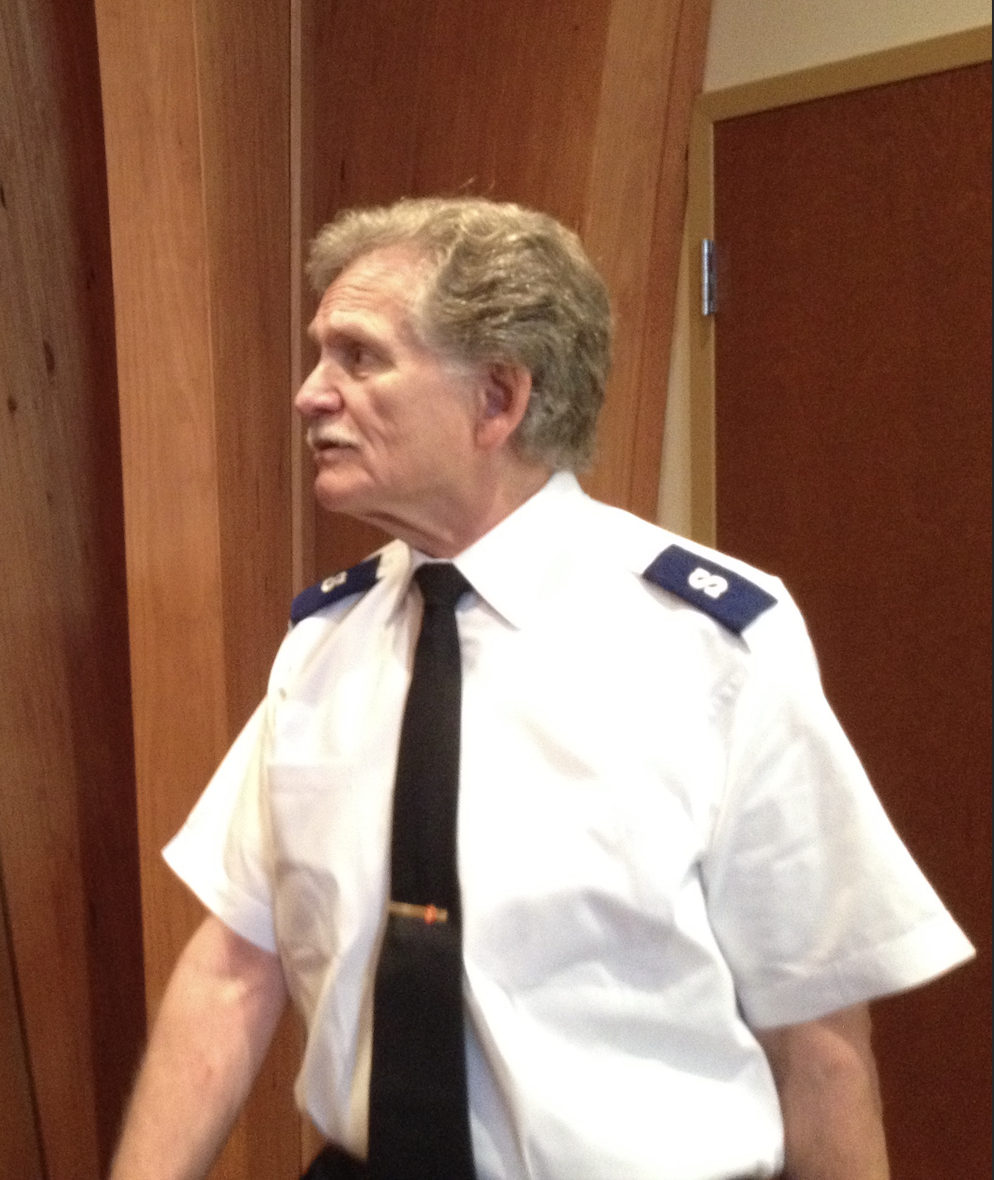
- James Curnow in Salvation Army uniform
- Born: April 17, 1943 (age 83); Port Huron, Michigan, U.S.
- Occupation: Composer

James Curnow (born 17 April 1943) is a composer of music for concert bands, brass bands, vocal and instrumental solos and ensembles. Curnow has also written arrangements of music pieces such as Trumpet Voluntary. He has taught at both public schools and on college and university levels.

== Early life and career ==
James Curnow was born in Port Huron, Michigan and raised in Royal Oak, Michigan, where he received his initial musical training in the public schools and The Salvation Army Instrumental Programs in these cities. He currently lives in Nicholasville, Kentucky where he is president, composer, and educational consultant for Curnow Music Press, Inc. He also serves as Composer-in-residence (emeritus) on the faculty of Asbury University in Wilmore, Kentucky.

== Selected compositions ==
- 1977, Symphonic Triptych
- 1979, Collage for Band
- 1980, Mutanza
- 1983, American Triptych
- 1984, Symphonic Variants for Euphonium and Symphonic Band
- 1985, Australian Variants Suite
- 1986, Legend and Sundance
- 1986, Appalachian Mountain Folk Song Suite
- 1987, Rejouissance Fantasia on Eine feste Burg ist unser Gott av Martin Luther
- 1988, Welsh Variants
- 1992, Silver Celebration
- 1994, Lochinvar
- The Mortal World
- The Undersea World
- Fanfare and Flourishes
- Fanfare and Jubiloso
- Fanfare for Spartacus
- Fanfare Prelude "O God, Our Help in Ages Past"
- Four Colonial Country Dances
- Introduction and the Humor of Boston
- Lord Mayor's Delight
- Colonial Jig
- Devil's Dream
- Freedom Road
- Infinity
- Introduction and Capriccio (for Clarinet and Band)
- Ode and Epinicion
- Odyssey
- Of Courage and Patriotism
- Olympic Fanfare and Theme
- Pershing's Own
- "Prelude on a Hymn of Praise"
- "Rhapsody for Euphonium and Band"
- Symphonic Poem for Winds and Percussion
- The Eagle's Flight
- The Music - Makers
- The Old Man of the Mountain
- The Shepherd's Farewell
- The Sky World
- Canterbury Tales
- The Spirit Soars
- To Bind the Nations Wounds
- Where Never Lark or Eagle Flew
- Nathan Hale Trilogy
