= David Maslanka =

American composer (1943–2017)

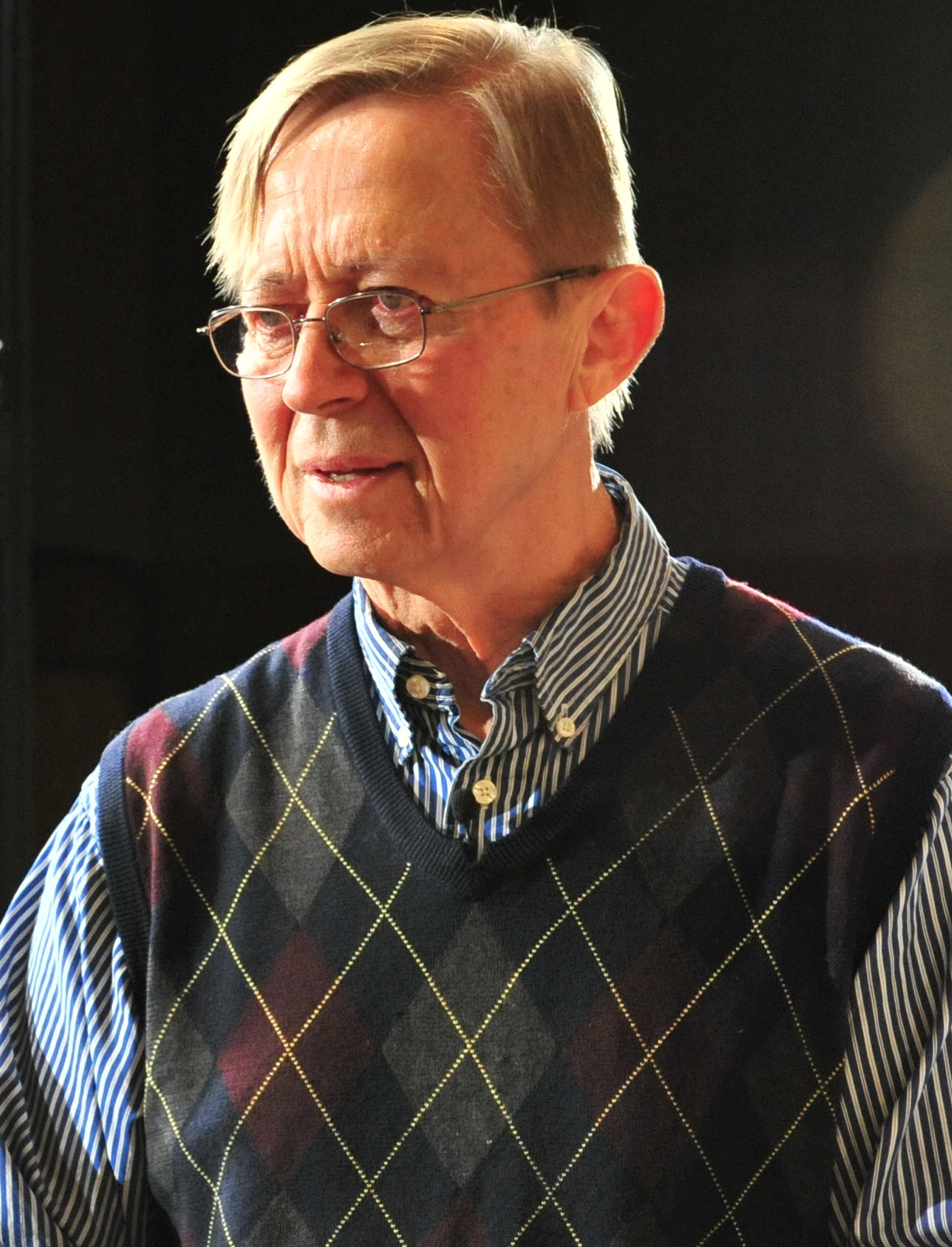

Background information
- Born: August 30, 1943; New Bedford, Massachusetts
- Died: August 7, 2017 (aged 73) Missoula, Montana
- Genres: Wind Literature
- Occupations: Composer, Musician
- Years active: 1968–2017
- Website: official website

David Maslanka (August 30, 1943 – August 7, 2017) was an American composer of Polish descent who wrote for a variety of genres, including works for choir, wind ensemble, chamber music, and symphony orchestra.

Best known for his wind ensemble compositions, Maslanka published over 150 pieces, including ten symphonies, eight of them for concert band, over 15 concerti, and a full Mass. His compositional style is rhythmically intense and complex, highly tonal and melodically oriented. His compositions have been performed throughout the United States, Europe, Australia, Canada, and Japan. His Tenth Symphony was orchestrated by his son, Matthew Maslanka, as it was incomplete at the composer's death.

== Life ==
Maslanka received his Bachelor of Music from the Oberlin Conservatory (1961–1965) and went on to earn a Master of Music and Doctor of Philosophy from Michigan State University (1965–71). During his undergraduate work, Maslanka also spent one year studying abroad at the Mozarteum in Salzburg, Austria (1963–64). While attending Michigan State University, Maslanka studied composition with H. Owen Reed.

He served on the faculty of the State University of New York at Geneseo from 1970 to 1974; of Sarah Lawrence College from 1975 to 1980; of New York University from 1980 to 1981; and of the Kingsborough Community College of the City University of New York from 1981 to 1990. Beginning in 1990, Maslanka was a freelance composer who worked solely on commissions.

He lived in Missoula, Montana. He had two brothers, John and Robert Maslanka.

David Maslanka married Alison Matthews in 1981. She died on July 3, 2017, and Maslanka himself died on August 7, 2017, following a brief battle with colon cancer. They are survived by three children: Steven, Matthew, and Kathryn.

Maslanka's Tenth Symphony (for concert band) was completed by his son Matthew, and received its premiere on 3 April 2018, by the University of Utah Wind Ensemble, Salt Lake City. It is an intensely personal piece for both David and Matthew. The first movement is named after Alison (David's wife) and was written during her fight with an immune disorder that eventually took her life. The movement is an expression of the rage and love that Maslanka felt through that process.

== Awards and honors ==
Maslanka received five residency fellowships at the MacDowell Colony in Peterborough, New Hampshire (1974, 1975, 1978, 1979, and 1982), as well as generous grants from the University of Connecticut Research Foundation, the American Music Center, the Martha Baird Rockefeller Fund for Music, the State University of New York Research Foundation, and the American Society of Composers, Authors, and Publishers (ASCAP). He earned the National Endowment for the Arts Composer Award three times (1974, 1975, and 1989). In 1999, he was awarded the National Symphony Orchestra regional composer-in-residence award. In 2008, he was initiated as an honorary member of the men's music fraternity, Phi Mu Alpha Sinfonia, by the Rho Tau chapter at Appalachian State University during the annual Contemporary Music Festival. From 1980 until his death in 2017, Maslanka served as a guest composer for over 100 universities, music festivals, and conferences.

== Works ==
Many of Maslanka's compositions for winds and percussion have become established pieces in band repertoire. Among these pieces are A Child's Garden of Dreams, Rollo Takes a Walk, Hymn for World Peace, numerous concertos featuring a wide variety of solo instruments, including euphonium, flute, piano, marimba, alto saxophone, and trombone. Maslanka's second and fourth symphonies have become particularly popular wind literature. His works for percussion include Montana Music: Three Dances for Percussion, Variations on 'Lost Love', My Lady White, Arcadia II: Concerto for Marimba and Percussion Ensemble, and Crown of Thorns. Maslanka also wrote a complete Mass for full choir, soprano, and baritone solo, with accompaniment by full symphonic band. Several of Maslanka’s compositions were influenced by his close relationship with the ocean, having spent his childhood on the coast of New England. Sea Dreams, for example, as well as the second movement of his second symphony, reference large bodies of water. He has also acknowledged the influence of his Polish heritage on his compositions.

Maslanka's works have been recorded and produced primarily by Albany Records and Carl Fischer, as well as Cambria Records, Crest, CRI, Klavier Music Productions, Mark, Novisse, St. Olaf, and Umass labels.
