= Robert E. Jager =

- Born: August 25, 1939 (age 87); Binghamton, New York
- Genres: Classical, orchestral, contemporary
- Occupations: Composer, conductor

Robert Edward Jager (born August 25, 1939) is an American composer, music theorist and a conductor.

== Life ==
Jager was born in Binghamton, New York on August 25, 1939. From 1962 to 1965 he was arranger/composer for the US-Navy Armed Forces School of Music. He completed his studies and graduated from the University of Michigan in 1968. He then went on to be the lecturer in composition and directing at Old Dominion University in Norfolk, Virginia. In 1971, he left Old Dominion University to become a professor at Tennessee Technological University in Cookeville, TN from which he retired in 2001.

In his career, Jager has received numerous honors for his works, including being the only three-time winner of the American Bandmasters Association Ostwald Composition Award (1964, 1968, 1972.)

== Works ==
=== Works for Orchestra ===
- 1973 – A Child's Garden of Verses for Soprano and Chamber Orchestra
- 1989 – The Pied Piper OF Hamelin for narrator and orchestra
- 1994 – Kokopelli Dances for flute and orchestra
- 1996 – Suite from "Edvard Munch"
- 2000 – Like A White Daisy Looks
- 2001 – The Grandeur OF God for Chorus and Orchestra
- 2010 – Esprit de Corps
- 1996 – I Dream of Peace for children's choir and chamber orchestra
- 2009 – Of Things Remembered for string orchestra
- 2015 – The War Prayer for narrator and orchestra

=== Works for Wind Ensemble ===
- 1957 – First Suite for Band
- 1963 – Stars and Bars March
- 1964 – Symphony for Band
- 1964 – Second Suite for Band
- 1965 – Sinfonia Nobilissima
- 1966 – Third Suite for Band
- 1966 – Chorale and Toccata
- 1967 – March "Dramatic"
- 1968 – Diamond Variations
- 1968 – The Tennessean March
- 1968 – Variations on A Theme of Robert Schumann
- 1969 – Sinfonietta
- 1970 – Tour de Force
- 1971 – Courage to Serve
- 1972 – Apocalypse
- 1975 – Preamble
- 1975 – Shivaree
- 1976 – Japanese Prints
- 1976 – Prelude: Concert Liberte
- 1976 – Symphony No. 2
- 1977 – Concerto No. 2 for Alto Saxophone
- 1978 – Carpathian Sketches
- 1978 – Jubilate
- 1979 – Pastorale and Country Dance
- 1981 – Concerto for Tuba
- 1982 – Tableau
- 1983 – Prelude on an Old Southern Hymn
- 1984 – March of the Dragon Masters
- 1984 – Esprit de Corps
- 1984 – Concerto for Percussion and Wind Ensemble
- 1985 – Concerto for Euphonium and Band
- 1985 – Triumph and Tradition
- 1986 – Colonial Airs and Dances
- 1986 – Eagle Rock Overture
- 1986 – Heroic Saga
- 1986 – Old Time Spirit
- 1987 – Under the Big Top
- 1987 – A Commemorative Suite
- 1990 – Cliff Island Suite
- 1991 – Epilogue: "Lest We Forget"
- 1991 – Uncommon Valor - March
- 1992 – Lord, Guard and Guide
- 1993 – Meditations on a Scottish Hymn Tune
- 1993 – Three Chinese Miniatures
  1. The Wind
  2. Sen Jin De Ma (A Maiden)
  3. A Love Song of Kang Ting City
- 1995 – The Last Full Measure of Devotion
- 1999 – Variants on the Air Force Hymn
- 2000 – Hebraic Rhapsody
- 2001 – Joan of Arc
- 2001 – Mystic Chords of Memory
- 2004 – Concert in The park
- 2004 – Highland Fling (originally named Covenant)
- 2004 – In Sunshine and Shadows for Soprano and Winds
- 2004 – Baritone Solos for Mixed Choir
- 2006 – Eternal Vigilance
- 2010 – Scenes from "Penn's Woods"
- 2010 – A Sea of Glass Mingled with Fire
  1. Dance at the "Glory Hole"
  2. Of "Sea Forms," Venetians and Putti"
  3. The Boathouse Gang
