= Symphony in B-flat for Band (Hindemith) =

1951 three-piece symphony by Paul Hindemith

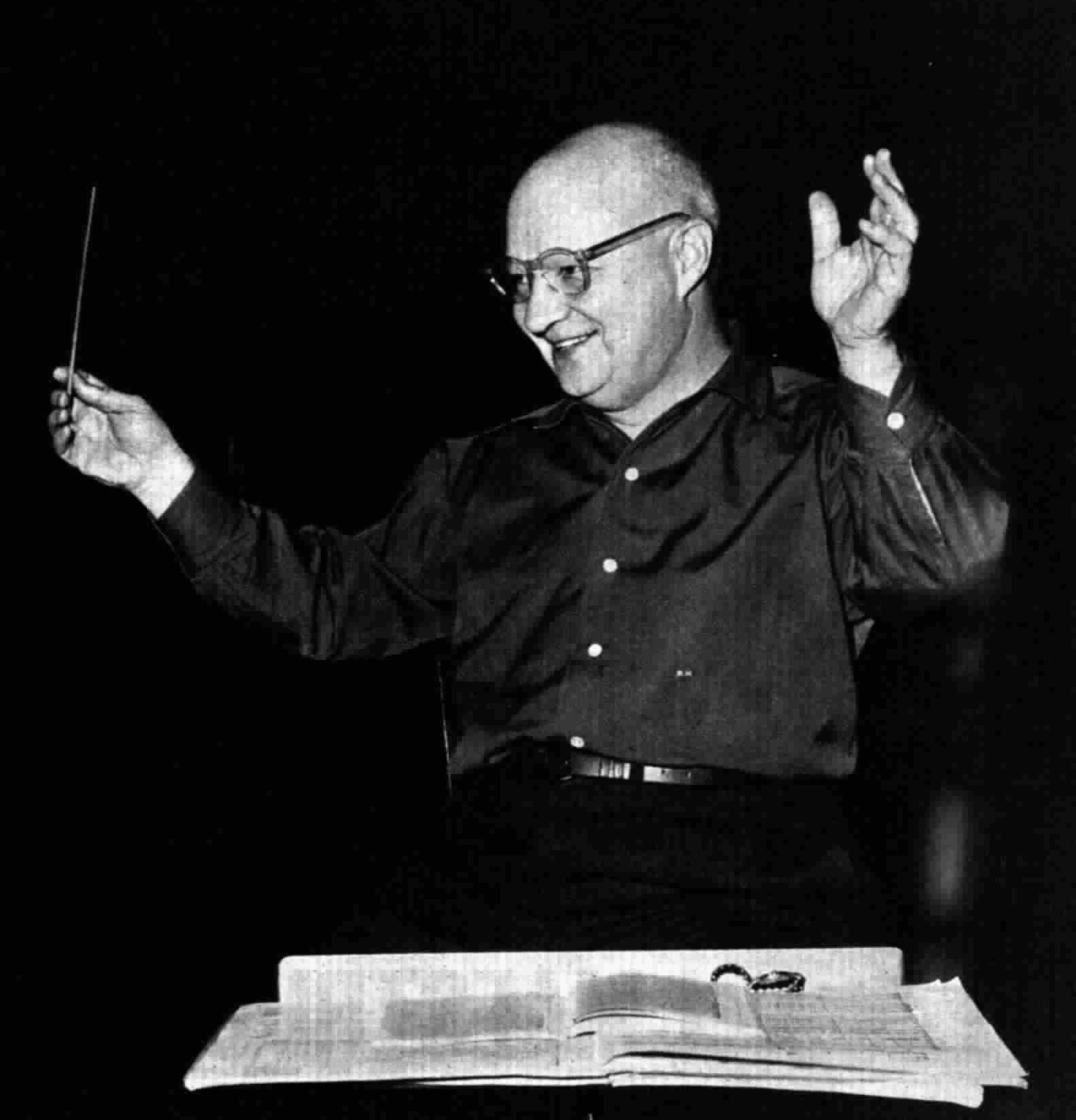
Paul Hindemith in 1958

Symphony in B♭ for Band was written by the German composer Paul Hindemith in 1951. It was premiered on April 5 of that year by the U.S. Army Band "Pershing's Own" with the composer conducting.

== Instrumentation ==
The Symphony is scored for:

- Woodwind: 2 flutes, piccolo, 2 oboes, E♭ clarinet, 4 B♭ clarinets, alto clarinet, bass clarinet, 2 bassoons, 2 alto saxophones, tenor saxophone, baritone saxophone
- Brass: 4 cornets, 2 trumpets, 4 horns, 3 trombones, euphonium, tuba
- Percussion: timpani, bass drum, cymbals, glockenspiel, snare drum, tambourine, triangle

The contrapuntal textures used by Hindemith throughout the symphony highlight many instruments individually. This writing takes advantage of the vast color palette that this combination of instruments offers.

== Critical reception ==
Richard Franko Goldman, a bandmaster himself and a music critic of the mid-20th century, called the piece "singularly dead". He states that composing for band is difficult because "the agglomeration of instruments is irrational and exasperating". He previously lamented that the piece falls "between the effort to be popular and obvious, and the intention to remain unsmiling and uncorrupted".

== Performances ==
- The first Boston-area performance of the Symphony in B♭ for Band was at the Massachusetts Institute of Technology on May 13, 1955 with conductor John Corley.
- There are two recordings of this piece conducted by composer: Philharmonia Orchestra (1956, EMI, issued 1958 as Angel LP 35489) and Bavarian Radio Symphony Orchestra (recorded at the Herkulessaal der Müncher Residenz, 8 October 1959, issued 1989 as ORFEO cassette tape).
