= Symphony No. 3 (Corigliano) =

The Symphony No. 3, Circus Maximus, is a composition for wind ensemble in eight movements by the American composer John Corigliano. The work was commissioned by the University of Texas at Austin Butler School of Music for the University of Texas Wind Ensemble. It was given its world premiere by the University of Texas Wind Ensemble under their conductor Jerry Junkin at the Bass Concert Hall in the University of Texas Performing Arts Center on February 16, 2005. The symphony is dedicated to Junkin and is the composer's first piece written specifically for concert band.

== Composition ==
=== Background ===
Circus Maximus was composed at the behest of the conductor Jerry Junkin, Director of Bands at the University of Texas at Austin. Junkin had originally approached Corigliano about composing a wind ensemble piece years before, but the composer turned the offer down, later remarking, "the thought of that enormous ensemble, composed of so many instruments I had never written for, overwhelmed me." Junkin persisted, however, and Corigliano eventually agreed to compose the work. Corigliano wrote in the score program notes, "Jerry wanted a large and theatrical piece: a third symphony. And, when I thought about that, it made a certain sense. My first symphony was for large symphony orchestra, my second for string orchestra alone, and this piece is for winds, brass and percussion alone."

The title of the work came early in the composition process and is derived from the eponymous Roman chariot racing stadium Circus Maximus. Corigliano intended the title and music to reflect the decadence of the ancient Roman Empire with modern entertainment culture. In a 2010 interview with Lawrence A. Johnson of the Chicago Classical Review, the composer remarked:

We are besieged by entertainment. We're just saturated with information, if you look at a news broadcast you've got the crawl on the bottom, you have the newscaster talking and in the right-hand corner you have a picture of something else. So many different activities have to happen at the same time today. And there's a shorter attention span because we're multi-tasking like crazy. We're able to do five different things without doing anything neatly.

=== Structure ===
The symphony has a duration of roughly 35 minutes and is composed in eight continuous movements:

1. Introitus
2. Screen / Siren
3. Channel Surfing
4. Night Music I
5. Night Music II
6. Circus Maximus
7. Prayer
8. Coda: Veritas

=== Instrumentation ===
The symphony is scored for a large wind ensemble divided into three separate groups of players: the stage band, an antiphonal "surround band," and a marching band located at the back of the concert hall:

==== Stage band ====
Woodwinds
4 flutes (1st and 2nd doubling piccolo)
4 oboes (1st doubling English horn)
3 clarinets
2 bass clarinets
1 contrabass clarinet
3 bassoons
1 contrabassoon

Brass
4 horns
4 trumpets (1st and 2nd doubling trumpet in D)
4 trombones
2 euphoniums
2 tubas

Percussion
1 timpani
4–5 percussionists

Other
piano
harp

==== Surround band ====
1 clarinet
4 saxophones (1st and 2nd altos, tenor, and baritone)
11 trumpets
2 horns
3 percussionists
1 double bass

==== Marching band ====
1 piccolo (doubling flute)
1 E♭ clarinet
2 trumpets (5th and 7th from the surround band)
2 trombones
1 percussionist (2nd from the surround band)

The stage band requires the use of a 12-gauge shotgun to be fired at the end of the piece.

== Reception ==
Circus Maximus has received praise from music critics and audiences alike. Reviewing the world premiere, Robert Faires of The Austin Chronicle noted a five-minute standing ovation and four curtain calls after the works completion. He described the scene at the premiere, remarking, "[it] was more than a concert; it was an event, and the autograph seekers, the exceptionally loud buzz in the hall, the longest line at the Bass box office that I've seen in 20 years all testified that Austin had caught the sense of moment in the air." In regards to the work itself, Faires wrote:

This was a work that swelled to a deafening roar then faded to a whisper; that encompassed sinuous jazz, martial fanfares, circus music, hunting calls, and more, at times with one type of music interrupting another; that swung dramatically from apocalyptic chaos to pastoral serenity to urban turmoil to farce, each mood pushing or pulling against the next. It was a symphonic portrait of a world of extremes, of fragments competing for primacy, of a barrage of eclectic elements assaulting the senses.

Jeffrey Williams of the New York Concert Review observed a similar 10-minute standing ovation after a performance at Carnegie Hall, opining, "Circus Maximus is a musical depiction of this decadence, and a shockingly effective one at that. It is at turns brash, monstrous and grotesque, ear-splittingly loud, but also filled with humor and moments of poignancy. It grabs the listener by the throat and holds him there for the entirety of the work." The symphony has also been praised by Steve Smith of The New York Times, who wrote, "The piece [...] is a major statement: the product of an enfant terrible grown into an elder statesman, his prodigious, provocative faculties razor sharp."

== Recording ==
A recording of Circus Maximus, performed by the University of Texas Wind Ensemble under Jerry Junkin, was released in January 2009 through Naxos Records. The album also features Corigliano's four-movement Gazebo Dances arranged for concert band.

== See also ==
- List of compositions by John Corigliano
