= Julie Giroux =

American composer

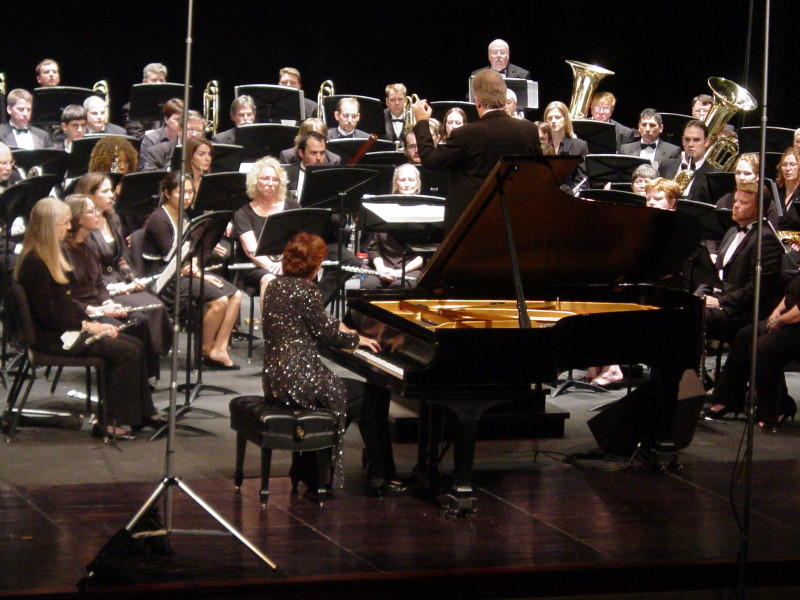
The composer Julie Giroux performing her piece for piano and band, Cordoba, in Houston, TX in 2010.

Julie Ann Giroux (born December 12, 1961) is an American pianist and composer of orchestral, choral, chamber, and numerous concert band works.

== Biography ==
Giroux was born in Fairhaven, Massachusetts. She graduated from Ouachita Parish High School, in Monroe, Louisiana, and earned a Bachelor of Music in Performance from Louisiana State University in Baton Rouge, Louisiana. During her college years, Giroux composed several concert band works which were published by Southern Music Company. Immediately after graduation she traveled to Los Angeles, California, and began orchestrating under the employ of American composer Bill Conti for the Television Mini Series North and South. While in Los Angeles Giroux studied with several composers and orchestrators including Bill Conti, Jack Eskew and Greg McRitchie.

From 1985 to 1997, Julie Giroux orchestrated for television and films including April Fool's Day, Dynasty, North and South, North and South Book II, The Karate Kid Part II, Broadcast News, Masters of the Universe, White Men Can't Jump, and Blaze.

In 1997, Giroux began to compose heavily for concert bands and orchestras publishing exclusively with Musica Propria. In 2004 Gia Publications, Inc. published the book entitled "Composers on Composing for Band, Volume Two" which features a chapter written by Julie Giroux. Her insightful chapter gives a down to earth description which is often humorous of her personal methods and techniques for composing for bands.

In 2009, Giroux, an accomplished pianist, performed her latest work Cordoba for Solo Piano and Concert Band in five U.S. cities and attended the premiere of Arcus IX, a work for Solo F Tuba and Concert Band at Blinn College in Brenham, Texas.

Her 2009 Film and documentary orchestrations and compositions include the ongoing project "Call for Green China" which primarily funded by World Bank was recorded, performed and broadcast live in China in 2007. In 2009 the project was extended with new musical material, recorded and set to tour seven cities in China where the show will be performed live.

Giroux's Symphony No. V "Elements" by the Eastern Wind Symphony, featuring Conductor Todd Nichols premiered on June 9, 2018. Her trumpet concerto commissioned by Conductor Ray Cramer, The Musashino Academia Musicae and principal trumpet Christopher Martin (trumpeter) of the New York Philharmonic premiered by the commissioners at The Midwest Clinic in December 2018.

An advocate of gun control and mental health awareness, Mrs. Giroux composed the work My Soul to Keep as a way to fight violence with music. In addition to its poignant lyrics and music, Giroux has made the work "Free, for everybody, forever". She has created several different settings, from a cappella SATB choir to symphonic band with choir. Orchestral and vocal arrangements will also be added. The premiere took place in Orlando, Florida, the place of the second largest mass shooting in the U.S., with the Pride Bands Alliance Symphonic Band on October 13, 2019. The next large concert will be in Las Vegas, Nevada in October 2020, the site of the largest mass shooting in American history.

Giroux is a Member of American Bandmasters Association (ABA) and an honorary brother of the Omicron chapter of Kappa Kappa Psi at West Virginia University. She was initiated into the fraternity on April 2, 2005, and in December, 2017 she was awarded the Distinguished Service to Music Medal.

Julie Giroux currently resides in Madison, Mississippi and continues to compose, orchestrate and arrange for television, movies, video games, wind bands and orchestras.

== Published compositions ==
Giroux's concert works are published by Musica Propria and Southern Music Company. Most have been recorded by Mark Custom Recordings, Fontec, Klavier, and Naxos. Numerous United States Military Band recordings include her works. Those compact discs can be obtained by contacting the appropriate military band or purchased through various labels. All of the Concert Band/Wind Ensemble listed works are Published and most can be listened to at Giroux's official website.

=== Orchestra ===
- Fort McHenry Suite
  1. The Rockets Red Glare
  2. Dimly Seen Through the Mists of the Deep
  3. Freemen Shall Stand
- Arcus IX
- La Mezquita de Cordoba
- Moorish Piano Concerto for Piano and Orchestra in Four Movements

=== Concert band and wind ensemble ===
- A Time to Dance
- All Good Things
- Always
- Amaranthine
- Arcus IX (for solo f tuba and band)
- Autumn Rose (2017)
- Before the Sun (2013)
- Beyond the Gates (2022)
- Boston Liberties (2009)
- Carnaval! (2013)
- Celestial Seas (2014)
- Chorale for Wind Band & Melodic Percussion (2016)
- Circus Franticus
- Cordoba (for solo piano and band)2009
- Crown of Thorns
- Dragon Sky (2017)
- Dream Dancer
- Empire
- Fantasie in French
- Field of Dreams (2019)
- Fort McHenry Suite
- Freedom Rising
- Glenbury Grove
- Glorious Light
- (The)Grace in Being (2013)
- Hands of Mercy
- HardDrive (2010)
- Husaria Cavalry Overture
- Hymn for the Innocent (2017)
- Il Burlone
- I'll Be Home A'fore Ye
- Imbizo
- Impressions (2017)
- In My Father's Eyes (female voices & Wind Band)(2017)
- Italian Rhapsody (2009)
- J (2017)
- Journey Through Orion
- Just Flyin' (2016)
- K2 (2012)
- Kalanu
- KHAN (2008)
- La Mezquita de Cordoba (2007)
- Legacy
- Let Your Spirit Sing
- Louisiana Parish Sketches
- Mambo Perro Loco
- March of the Sun Dried Tomatoes
- Medalist Fanfare & Celebration (2014)
- Mile High (2023)
- Movin' On Down the Line
- Mystery on Mena Mountain (1979)
- No Man's Land (2017)
- Nothing That Is
- Of Blood & Stone: The Pyramids of Giza (2015)
- One Life Beautiful (2010)
- OPA! (2017)
- Ouachita
- Our Cast Aways (2018)
- Outcasts (2025)
- Outlander (2009)
- Overture in Five Flat
- Paprikash (2014)
- Poseidon
- Primality!
- Prisoner of the Ring (1984)
- Riften Wed (2014)
- Shadow Falls (2013)
- Shine (2017)
- Space Symphony
- Strathcona Suite
- Swashbuckler
- The Ash Grove (2019)
- The Bonsai Tree (2010)
- The Hearthstone (2016)
- The Grace in Being (2015-2017)
- The Greatest Generation
- The Nature of the Beast
- The Necromancer
- The Speed of Heat (2011)
- Three Fanfares
- Tiger Tail March
- To Walk With Wings
- Trillium
- Twelve Gallon Hat (2013)
- Under the Willow (2015)
- Vigils Keep
- Vortex (2016)
- Wagon Trail
- West Wind Overture
- What Goes in the Night
- When Country Comes to Town
- Where the Red Fern Grows (2016)

==== Symphonies for concert band and wind ensemble ====
- Symphony No. I Culloden (3 Movements)
  1. Heilan Lochs, Bairns & Heather
  2. I Hae Grat for Tho' I Kend
  3. We Toomed Our Stoops for the Gaudy Sodgers
- Symphony No. II No Finer Calling (3 Movements)
  1. Integrity March
  2. Far From Home
  3. Honor Above All
- Symphony No. III A Symphony of Fables (5 Movements)
  1. The Lion and the Mouse
  2. The Pied Piper of Hamelin
  3. The Tortoise and the Hare
  4. The Ugly Duckling
  5. The Three Billy Goats Gruff
- Symphony No. IV Bookmarks from Japan (composed in 2013 - 6 Movements)
  1. Mount Fuji - "Fuji-san"
  2. Nihonbashi - "Market Bridge"
  3. The Great Wave off Kanagawa - "The Life of One Wave"
  4. Kinryuzan Temple in Asakusa - "Thunder Gate"
  5. Evening Snow at Kambara - "Light is the Touch"
  6. Hakone - "Drifting"
- Symphony No. V ELEMENTS - (composed in 2017-2018 - 3 Movements)
  1. Sun
  2. Rain
  3. Wind
- Symphony No. VI The Blue Marble - (composed in 2021-2022 - 3 Movements)
  1. The Blue Marble
  2. Voices in Green
  3. Let There be Life
- Symphony No. VII TITAN - (composed in 2024-2025 - 6+? Movements)
  1. Sunrise on CoRoT-7b — Lava Planet
  2. Where Stars Are Born
  3. Lord of a Thousand Rings — Super Saturn, Star J1407b
  4. Departure — A Final Farewell Thee Well to Earth
  5. Sleeping Dragon — Rumiko & Junichi
  6. Kraken Mare — Sailing the Seas of Titan

=== Arrangements ===
- In The Bleak Midwinter
- Silent Night in Gotham
- A Stocking Full of Composers
- Christmas with Mozart
- O Holy Night (arrangement for solo soprano and band)
- Nearer My God to Thee
- Christmas & Sousa Forever!
- Peter Patapan
- The Little Bolero Boy
- Hark! Those Jingle Bells are Smokin'
- Merrily on High
- All Through the Night
- The First Noel
- The 12 Days of Christmas
- What Child is Ringing those Bells?
- I Got Rhythm, for Christmas
- Jingle them Bells
- Three Wise Guys
- Away in the Manger
- Christmas Toons
- One Torch, Two Women, Three Ships and Men Rejoicing
- The Blue Danube Christmas Waltz
- I'll Be Home for Christmas (Brass Feature)
- A Very Merry Heart & Soul
- Nutcracker Fantasia
- Concerto in F Minor, Op. 8, No. 4(RV297), "L'inverno" 1st Movement (Winter)- Vivaldi (Woodwind Feature)
- Drummer Boy Charlie (Percussion & Rhythm Feature)

== Recordings ==
The Music of Julie Giroux
Released by Mark Masters in 2010, recorded by the University of Texas at El Paso Wind Symphony with Ron Hufstader conducting.
Julie Giroux Presents "Concert Band Christmas Gone Crazy"
Released by Mark Masters in 2011, recorded by the University of Texas at El Paso Wind Symphony with Ron Hufstader conducting.
Jingle them Bells - Christmas Favorites Re-imagined by Julie Giroux
Released by Klavier, Distributed by Naxos - UPC:019688704322, Item Number: K 77043, Release Date: Oct 30, 2012. Performed by the University of North Texas Symphonic Band, Dennis Fisher conducting.
A Few Notes Between Friends - The Music of Julie Giroux
Released by Klavier, Distributed by Naxos - Released: Nov 11, 2014℗ 2014 Klavier. Performed by the University of North Texas Symphonic Band, Dennis Fisher, Paula Crider, Bruce Gilkes, Brendan Hagan, Bill Conti, Ray Cramer, Lowell Graham, Alan Sierichs & Julie Giroux conducting.
SHINE - Julie Giroux
Released by Klavier, Distributed by Naxos - Released April 20, 2018. Performed by the University of North Texas Symphonic Band, Dennis Fisher Conducting. Bruce Leeks Recording Engineer.
ELEMENTS - Julie Giroux - The Eastern Wind Symphony
Audio CD - August 9, 2019, Label: Mark Records, ASIN: B07T4N5BG3
