= List of Kappa Kappa Psi members =

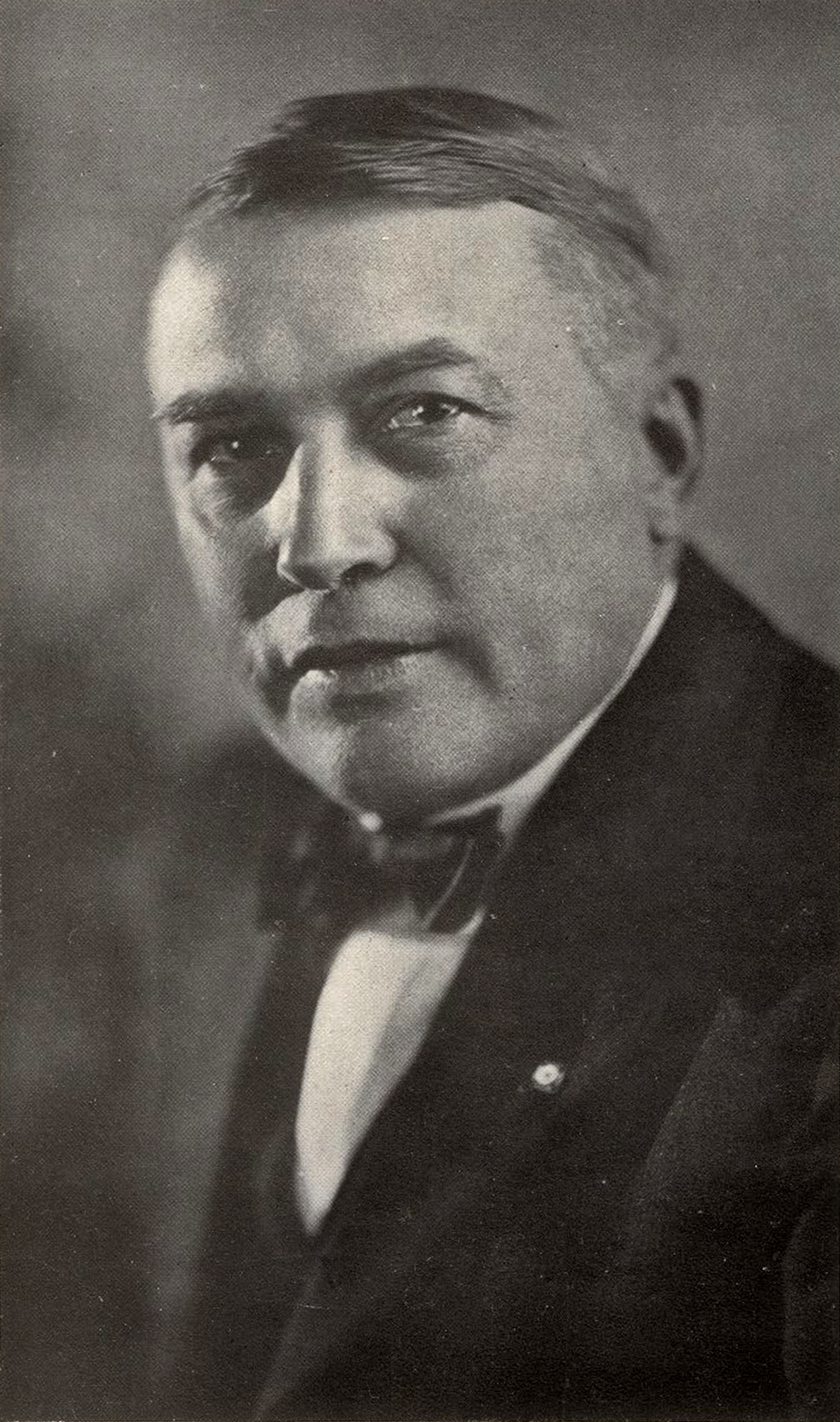
Bohumil Makovsky

This is a list of some of the notable members of Kappa Kappa Psi, a national honorary fraternity for college band members. Kappa Kappa Psi was founded on November 27, 1919, at Oklahoma Agricultural and Mechanical College in Stillwater, Oklahoma. Kappa Kappa Psi became a coeducational organization in 1977, and at the national convention in 1989, the fraternity voted to call all members "brothers" regardless of sex or gender.

== Prominent members ==
=== Founding Fathers ===
- William Alexander Scroggs, "Founder"
- William Houston Coppedge
- Clyde DeWitt Haston
- George Asher Hendrickson
- Dick Hurst
- A. Frank Martin
- Iron Hawthorne Nelson
- Raymond David Shannon
- Clayton Everett Soule
- Carl Anderson Stevens

==== Other important early members ====
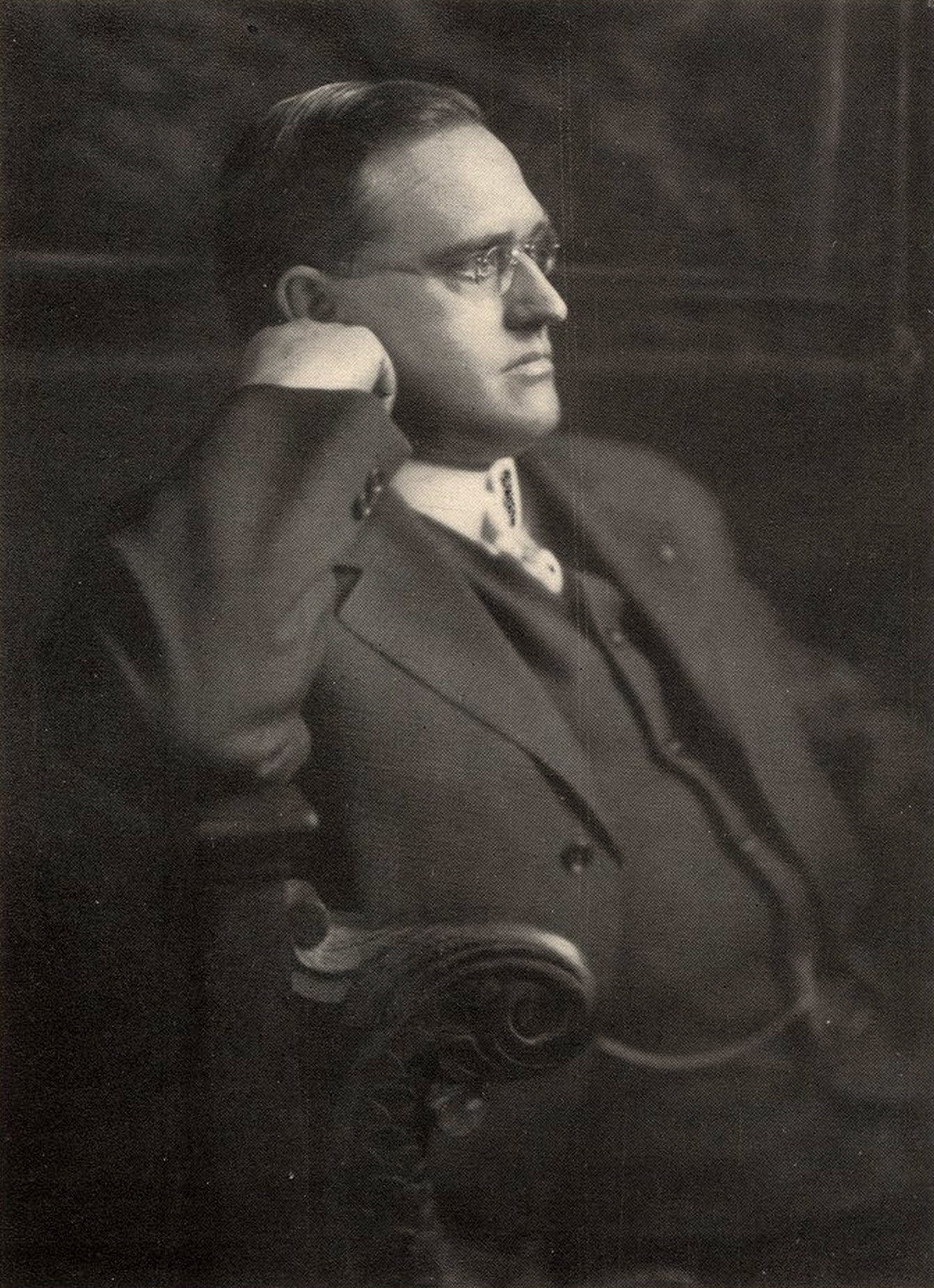
Hilton Ira Jones, Life Member #21

These members were not undergraduate members or considered "founding fathers," but were important to the early success of the fraternity.

- Hilton Ira Jones, professor of chemistry; gave the name and Greek letters "Kappa Kappa Psi"
- Bohumil Makovsky (honorary), the "Guiding Spirit" of Kappa Kappa Psi; Oklahoma A&M band director
- Frank D. Wickham, ROTC Commandant; assisted with work on the Ritual

=== Band leaders ===
- Herbert L. Clarke
- Henry Fillmore
- Edwin Franko Goldman
- Richard Franko Goldman
- Derek Hilliard
- George S. Howard
- Karl King
- Paul Lavalle
- Frank Simon
- John Philip Sousa

=== Composers ===
- Leroy Anderson
- Milton Babbitt
- Robert Russell Bennett
- Lucien Caillet
- Hoagy Carmichael
- Jay Chattaway
- Paul Creston
- Norman Dello Joio
- Don Gillis
- Julie Giroux
- Morton Gould
- Ferde Grofe
- David Holsinger
- Karel Husa
- David Maslanka
- Bill Moffit
- Václav Nelhýbel
- Robert W. Smith

=== Educators ===
- Leonard Falcone
- Frederick Fennell
- William P. Foster
- Isaac B. Greggs
- Tim Lautzenheiser
- Tyler Long
- Joseph Maddy
- William Revelli
- H. Robert Reynolds
- Thomas Tyra
- Herman B Wells
- John Whitwell

=== Performing artists ===
- Count Basie
- William Bell
- Velvet Brown
- Ray Charles
- Van Cliburn
- John Denver
- Mo B. Dick
- Dwele
- Earth, Wind & Fire
- Maynard Ferguson
- Pete Fountain
- Dizzy Gillespie
- Al Hirt
- Dave Hollister
- Freddie Hubbard
- Stan Kenton
- Ellie Mannette
- Branford Marsalis
- Wynton Marsalis
- Harvey Phillips
- Sigurd Rascher
- Buddy Rich
- Lionel Richie
- Peter Schickele
- Doc Severinsen
- Ed Shaughnessy
- Red Skelton
- Rickey Smiley
- Midnight Star
- Fred Waring
- Lawrence Welk
- D'Extra Wiley

=== Others ===
- Neil Armstrong, Apollo 11 astronaut and first person to walk on the Moon
- Lauro Cavazos, United States Secretary of Education
- Bill Clinton, President of the United States
- Bob Knight, long-time coach of the Indiana Hoosiers men's basketball team
- Chuck Norris, actor
- Truman Washington Dailey, member of the Otoe-Missouria Tribe of Indians and last native speaker of the Chiwere language
