= National Intercollegiate Band =

American intercollegiate concert band

Background information
- Also known as: NIB
- Origin: Stillwater, Oklahoma, United States
- Genres: Concert band music, concert marches
- Years active: 1947–present
- Labels: Mark Records, Century Records
- Members: Organizational Directors; Anthony Falcone; Dr. LaToya Webb; Commissioned Composer; Kevin Day; Guest Conductor; Dr. Jason Fettig
- Website: nib.kkytbs.org

The National Intercollegiate Band (NIB) is a concert band, sponsored by honorary band fraternity and sorority Kappa Kappa Psi and Tau Beta Sigma, that performs every two years at the national convention of the two organizations. Organized in 1947, the NIB is the oldest national intercollegiate band in the United States, and is open to all collegiate band members regardless of membership in Kappa Kappa Psi or Tau Beta Sigma.

Since 1953, the National Intercollegiate Band has been the resident ensemble of Kappa Kappa Psi and Tau Beta Sigma's Commissioning Program, which has added thirty new works to the band repertoire since its inception and is the longest-running commissioning program for wind band music in the United States.

The National Intercollegiate Band has performed under the baton of some of the most renowned wind band conductors in the history of the ensemble, including William Revelli, Frederick Fennell, James Croft, and others, several of whom have been honored as inductees into the National Band Association Hall of Fame of Distinguished Band Conductors.

== History ==
=== Early steps, 1922–1947 ===
In 1922, Kappa Kappa Psi announced its plan to hold the first national intercollegiate band contest in American history. A brief dispatch in the 1922 Baton explained, "Sometime within the next two years the Kappa Kappa Psi Fraternity will hold a National Intercollegiate Band Contest. This enterprise will be the first of its kind ever attempted. As Music (sic) is becoming the foremost Art in America, our Fraternity aims to assist in so spreading the good work." This early announcement did not culminate in a contest, and the idea of a national intercollegiate band was not revisited again by Kappa Kappa Psi until the 1940s.

In the meantime, the first Kappa Kappa Psi-sponsored intercollegiate band was established by F. Lee Bowling in 1933, with musicians from the University of Colorado (home of the Alpha Iota chapter of Kappa Kappa Psi), the University of Denver (Alpha Lambda), Colorado State College of Agricultural and Mechanical Arts (Kappa), Colorado State College of Education (Alpha Theta), the Colorado School of Mines (Xi), and the University of Utah participating. In 1934, the University of Utah left the intercollegiate band and the University of Wyoming (Alpha Nu) took its place. The concerts held by this Rocky Mountain Intercollegiate Band were sponsored by the local chapters of Kappa Kappa Psi and many members of the fraternity participated in the ensemble. The first concert of the Rocky Mountain Intercollegiate Band was held in February 1933, and the band gave annual concerts during Denver Music Week. Bowling left the band's managership in 1937.

=== National Intercollegiate Band established, 1947 ===
Bowling was elected Grand President of Kappa Kappa Psi in 1941 and presented a plan to hold a national intercollegiate band concert, modeled after the Rocky Mountain intercollegiate bands. The delegation endorsed the plan, which was to be executed at the next biennial national convention in Stillwater in 1943, the silver jubilee of the fraternity. However, due to World War II, the 1943 and 1945 national conventions were not held, and so the next biennial convention was held in 1947. The first National Intercollegiate Band gave a concert on the evening of Friday, March 7, 1947. All delegates, officers, and visitors to the convention performed in the ensemble, which was augmented by Kappa Kappa Psi members from the Oklahoma A&M Symphonic Band so the band had a balanced instrumentation.

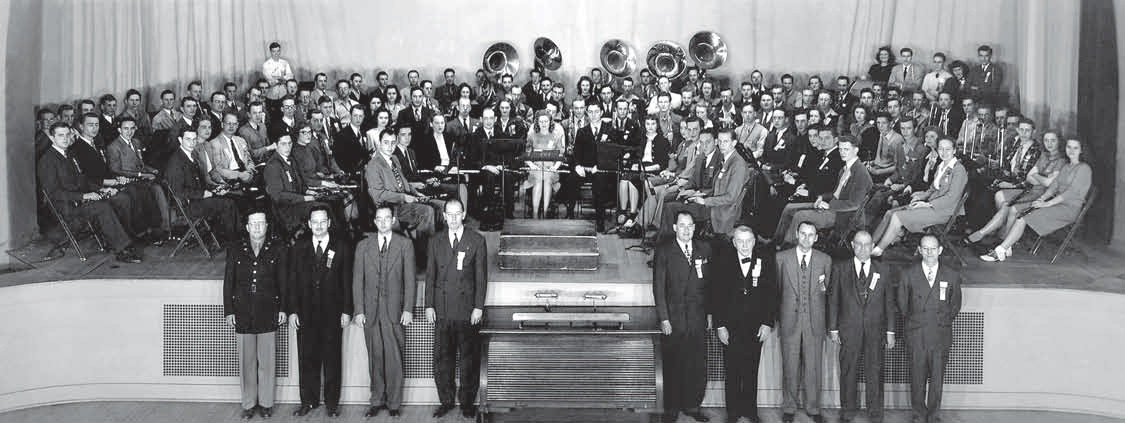
The first National Intercollegiate Band, 1947

Grand First Vice-President William A. Scroggs, founder of the fraternity, conducted the band in their first piece, Semper Fidelis. Max A. Mitchell, Grand Second Vice-President, conducted Leonard Smith's Spanish Caprice, a piece for band and solo cornet. Bohumil Makovsky, Past Grand President and Chairman of the Board of Trustees, conducted his march, Kappa Kappa Psi, and F. Lee Bowling conducted J. DeForest Cline's Kappa Kappa Psi march. The 1947 NIB was recognized as the first-ever intercollegiate band assembled with a national scope in the United States. Since 1947, the fraternity has presented the F. Lee Bowling Participation Award to the college or university who has had the most students participate in the National Intercollegiate Band, regardless of membership in Kappa Kappa Psi or Tau Beta Sigma. In the case of a tie, multiple awards are presented.

The 1957 National Intercollegiate Band performed in the Salt Lake Tabernacle in Salt Lake City on August 24, 1957, under the direction of Lieutenant Colonel William F. Santelmann, retired director of the United States Marine Band. The band comprised 112 musicians from Utah, Florida, Maryland, Colorado, Ohio, Texas, Indiana, and New Mexico, and premiered Robert Russell Bennett's new work Symphonic Songs for Band.

In 1969, the fiftieth anniversary of Kappa Kappa Psi, there were enough performers to create two bands. The National Intercollegiate Symphonic Band, the top ensemble, was conducted by Norman Dello Joio and premiered his new work, Songs of Abelard. The Symphonic Band also performed several other Dello Joio works, including Scenes from the Louvre, Variants on a Mediaeval Tune, and Fantasies on a Theme by Haydn. The National Intercollegiate Concert Band was conducted by Past Grand President Jay L. Slaughter, and performed Makovsky's Kappa Kappa Psi march and several other works.

=== National Intercollegiate Marching Band, 2002 ===
In June and July 2002, Kappa Kappa Psi and Tau Beta Sigma sponsored the first National Intercollegiate Marching Band, which traveled to the French Riviera, including the cities of Nice, Grasse, Aix-en-Provence, Cannes, Antibes, and the Principality of Monaco. The thirty-five member band, directed by Past National President Dr. Michael Golemo, performed at Le Suquet in Cannes, in Nice, and in front of the Prince's Palace of Monaco. Despite being billed as the "first biennial" intercollegiate marching band, the program was dissolved by the joint national councils after the inaugural trip due to its high cost and low attendance, which was believed to be caused by a fear of traveling abroad after the September 11 attacks.

== Guest artists ==
=== Featured composer ===
In 1953, Kappa Kappa Psi Grand President Hugh McMillen began the Commissioning Program to add new music to the band repertoire, beginning with a $500 commission of Don Gillis, who provided Ballet for Band for the NIB. The Commissioning Program is now the longest-running commissioning program for wind band music in American history, and has produced works that have secured a place in the emerging band canon and have garnered critical acclaim, such as Robert Russell Bennett's Symphonic Songs for Band and Karel Husa's Concerto for Trumpet and Wind Orchestra.

- Don Gillis, Ballet for Band (1953)
- Robert Russell Bennett, Symphonic Songs for Band (1957)
- Paul Creston, Prelude and Dance (1959)
- Clifton Williams, Symphonic Essays (1963)
- Václav Nelhýbel, Symphonic Requiem (1965)
- Gunther Schuller, Study in Textures (1967)
- Norman Dello Joio, Songs of Abelard (1969)
- W. Francis McBeth, The Seventh Seal (1971)
- Karel Husa, Concerto for Trumpet and Wind Orchestra (1973)
- Martin Mailman, Let Us Now Praise Famous Men (1975)
- Claude T. Smith, Symphony No. 1 for Band (1977)
- Fisher Tull, Prelude & Double Fugue (1979)
- Mary Jeanne van Appledorn, LUX: Legend of Sankta Lucia (1981)
- Robert E. Jager, Stars and Stripes Variations (1983)
- James Barnes, Chorale Prelude: "Mein junges Leben hat ein End," Op. 61 (1985)
- Jerry Bilik, Overture Alfresco (1987)
- David Holsinger, Symphonic Canticle (1989)
- Anne McGinty, Athenian Festival (1989)
- Alfred Reed, Hymn Variants (based on "Lasst uns erfreuen, 1623") (1991)
- James Curnow, Daystar: Symphonic Variations for Wind and Percussion (1993)
- David Maslanka, A Tuning Piece: Songs of Fall and Winter (1995)
- John Zdechlik, Rondo Jubiloso (1997)
- Daniel Bukvich, Unusual Behavior in Ceremonies Involving Drums (1999)
- Timothy Mahr, Mourning Dances (2001)
- Jack Stamp, Bandancing (2003)
- Philip Sparke, The Seasons (2005)
- Eric Ewazen, Celestial Dancers (2007)
- Mark Camphouse, Two American Canvases (2009)
- Adam Gorb, Repercussions (2011)
- John Mackey, (Redacted) (2013)
- Julie Giroux, Of Blood & Stone: Pyramids of Giza (2015)
- Steven Bryant, Miniature Suite (2017)
- Joel Puckett, Fanfare for Friends (2019)
- Alex Shapiro, Suspended (2021)
- Michael Daugherty, The Adventures of Jesse Owens (2023)

=== Guest conductors ===
1947 Roger Fenn Hugh E. McMillen Leonard Haugh 1949 William Revelli 1951 Thor Johnson 1953 A. Austin Harding 1955 Frederick Fennell 1957 William F. Santelmann 1959 Paul Creston, Conductor-Composer Manley Whitcomb 1961 Richard Franko Goldman 1963 Charles Brendler	1965 Václav Nelhýbel, Conductor-Composer 1967 Keith Wilson 1969 Norman Dello Joio, Conductor-Composer 1971 W. Francis McBeth, Conductor-Composer William Revelli 1973 Arnald Gabriel 1975 Martin Mailman, Conductor-Composer William C. Moffitt 1977 Carmen Dragon 1979 Donald E. McGinnis 1981 Gary T. Garner Terry Milligan	1983 Donald Hunsberger James Sudduth 1985 William P. Foster Robert E. Foster 1987 Harry Begian John Wakefield 1989 John Paynter Joseph Missal 1991 Ray E. Cramer 1993 Paula Crider 1995 James Croft 1997 John Zdechlik, Conductor-Composer John L. Whitwell	1999 David Waybright 2001 L. Bryan Shelburne Timothy Mahr, Conductor-Composer Julie Giroux, Conductor-Composer 2003 Don Wilcox Jack Stamp, Conductor-Composer Alan L. Bonner 2005 Michael Haithcock 2007 Frank B. Wickes 2009 John R. Bourgeois 2011 Craig Kirchhoff 2013 Anthony Maiello 2015 Joseph Hermann 2017 Richard Clary 2019 Jerry F. Junkin 2021 Cynthia Johnston Turner

=== Guest performers ===
In the late 1960s and early 1970s, the National Intercollegiate Band featured professional guest artists as soloists with the band. Two of these, T. N. Retif and Raymond Crisara, were featured soloists in that year's commissioned piece: Retif on Dello Joio's Songs of Abelard and Crisara on Karel Husa's Concerto for Trumpet and Wind Orchestra.

- Sigurd Raschèr, saxophone (1967)
- Leonard B. Smith, cornet (1969)
- T. N. Retif, baritone voice (1969)
- John D. Mohler, clarinet (1971)
- Raymond Crisara, trumpet (1973)
