= F. D. Wickham =

United States Army colonel (1873–1942)

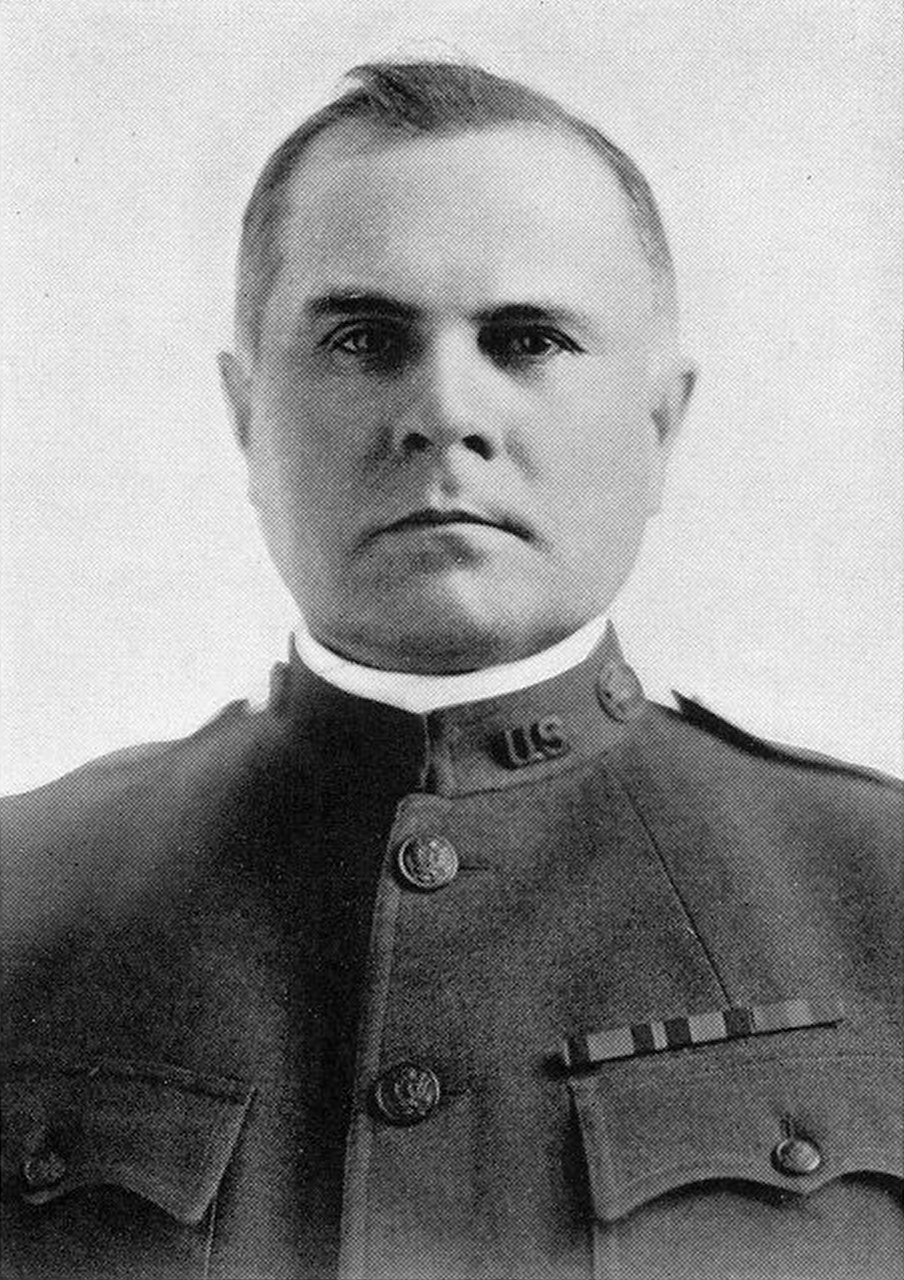
- Colonel F. D. Wickham, Commandant of Oklahoma A&M College Reserve Officers' Training Corps; 1919–1920
- Born: March 21, 1873; Gallatin, Missouri
- Died: October 29, 1942 (aged 69); El Paso, Texas
- Burial place: Fort Bliss National Cemetery
- Spouse: Myrtle Louise Logan (m. 1902)
- Relatives: Frank D. Wickham Jr. (son); Evelyn Wickham Forbes (daughter); Gladys Louise Wickham (daughter)
- Military career
- Allegiance: United States
- Branch: United States Army
- Service years: 1894–1897; 1898–1928
- Rank: Colonel
- Conflicts: Spanish–American War; Philippine–American War; World War I
- Awards: Army of Cuban Occupation Medal; Philippine Campaign Medal; Mexican Border Service Medal

Frank Dickenson Wickham (March 21, 1873 – October 29, 1942) was an American colonel. He is known for assisting with the creation of the ritual of Kappa Kappa Psi band fraternity during his time at Oklahoma A&M College in Stillwater, Oklahoma.

== Early life and military career ==
Wickham was born in Gallatin, Missouri to General Joseph Alfred Wickham and Lucy Ordway Cunningham. He graduated from high school in 1889 and attended the University of Missouri in Columbia, Missouri, where he became a member of the Zeta Phi chapter of Beta Theta Pi, captain of the university battalion, and played on the baseball team. Wickham left the university in 1893 and enlisted with the 8th Cavalry Regiment in 1894, where he served for three years. On June 25, 1902, Wickham married Myrtle Louise Logan.

== U.S. Army career ==
F. D. Wickham was commissioned as a Second Lieutenant in the United States Army and assigned to the 16th Infantry Regiment on June 27, 1898. Wickham was on duty with the 16th Infantry during the Spanish–American War, for which he received the Army of Cuban Occupation Medal; and the 18th Infantry during the Philippine–American War, for which he received the Philippine Campaign Medal. In 1902, Wickham transferred to the 12th Infantry Regiment by his request, and was promoted to captain on August 12, 1903. Captain Wickham was posted to the Mexican border at Nogales, Arizona during World War I in January 1916, and for this he received the Mexican Border Service Medal. On May 15, 1917, Wickham was promoted to major, and on the fifth of August he was made a lieutenant colonel of infantry in the National Army. On May 11, 1918, he was promoted to colonel of infantry in the National Army. Wickham was the commandant of the Main Training Depot, Machine Gun Training Center at Camp Hancock, Georgia, from May 1918 to February 1919.

=== Oklahoma A&M College ===
In March 1919, Colonel Wickham arrived at Oklahoma A&M College, in Stillwater, Oklahoma, to serve as commandant of the college's Reserve Officers' Training Corps. While at Oklahoma A&M, Wickham became acquainted with Major Bohumil Makovsky, director of the college regiment band. Makovsky introduced Wickham to A. Frank Martin, the regiment's band leader who was working with Makovsky and his fellow student William A. Scroggs to start a new band fraternity, Kappa Kappa Psi. Martin and Wickham collaborated to develop the fraternity's ritual, for which Wickham was honored with one of the first honorary memberships in the new fraternity at their first initiation in March 1920. Wickham also gave a short speech on "The Future of Kappa Kappa Psi" at the initiation banquet. While at Oklahoma A&M, Wickham militarized the college band, the effects of which were that "the band has come in close touch with the [military] department and has functioned under its direction successfully."

=== After Oklahoma A&M ===
On the July 1, 1920, Wickham was promoted to colonel in the Regular Army and assigned July 6 to the 38th Infantry Regiment, and was transferred to Camp Pike near Little Rock, Arkansas. From there he was transferred to Fort Douglas, Utah, with the 38th Infantry, where he established the "Wickham Cup" in 1921 as an award for marksmanship.

Wickham died October 29, 1942, in El Paso, Texas, and is buried next to his wife and son at Fort Bliss National Cemetery in El Paso.
