= Ray Cramer =

American classical composer

Ray E. Cramer
- Born: June 28, 1940
- Occupation: Conductor

Ray E. Cramer (born 28 June 1940) is an American band conductor.

== Education ==
Cramer has degrees from Western Illinois University and the University of Iowa. In December 1991, he received an honorary Doctorate of Humane Letters from his alma mater of Western Illinois University.

== Career ==
Cramer began his career as the band director at Harlan High School in Harlan, Iowa. From 1968 to 1969 he served as director of bands at Parma Senior High School in the Cleveland area of Ohio. He joined the faculty at Indiana University School of Music in the fall of 1969, and served as director of the Indiana University Marching Hundred from 1972 to 1982. In 1982, Cramer was appointed director of bands in the School of Music. He was a professor of music history, literature and wind conducting, retiring in 2005. He is the emeritus director of bands at Indiana University.

Cramer is a member of ABA, WASBE and IBA. He is affiliated with Phi Mu Alpha, Kappa Kappa Psi, Tau Beta Sigma, Phi Kappa Delta and Phi Beta Mu.

He was a guest conductor on the faculty of the Musashino Academy of Music in Tokyo, Japan in the fall of 1990, the summer of 1992 and 1995. Cramer was also the guest conductor for the Indiana Bandmasters Association All-State Honor Band in 1983, 1995, 2001, and 2012.

== Honors ==
Mr. Cramer is a recipient of the Student Alumni Council Senior Faculty Award (1983), The Kappa Kappa Psi Distinguished Service to Music Medal (1988), the CIDA Director of the Year Award (1988), Outstanding Bandmaster Award (1988) and the Kappa Kappa Psi Bohumil Makovsky Memorial Award (1991). He is a past national president of the College Band Directors National Association and has served as president of the Indiana Bandmasters Association, and the Big Ten Band Directors Association.
