= Distinguished Service to Music Medal =

- Distinguished Service to Music Medal, obverse
- Awarded for: "Exceptional service to American bands and band music"
- Presented by: Kappa Kappa Psi, National Honorary Band Fraternity
- First award: 1964
- Final award: 2024

The Distinguished Service to Music Medal is an award presented by Kappa Kappa Psi, National Honorary Band Fraternity in the United States. It is awarded to people who have contributed to the advancement of the wind band "as a cultural, musical and educational medium." The Distinguished Service to Music Medal has been awarded 156 times to 153 recipients.

The decoration itself is a golden star enameled in the fraternity colors of blue and white. The star, which symbolizes the fraternity ritual and motto, "Strive for the Highest", is surrounded by a golden laurel wreath, symbolizing achievement. Upon the star is the fraternity crest and the words "Distinguished Service" with the Greek letters "ΚΚΨ." The medal is surmounted by a lyre representing the field of music. The decoration may be worn suspended by a blue and white ribbon, for formal occasions or musical performances. The medal was designed by Jack K. Lee, Grand President from 1963 to 1965, and was first awarded to ten men and women.

== Recipients ==
=== First recipients ===
The first recipients of the Distinguished Service to Music Medal were awarded it in late 1964 and early 1965. The reasons for which these ten men and women were awarded the medal served as the basis for the categories for later awardees.

- Morton Gould (Composition)
- Frank Simon and William Revelli (Concert Band)
- Eugene J. Weigel (Marching Band)
- Sigurd Raschèr (Artist Performer)
- Earl Kent of C.G. Conn (Industrial Research and Progress)
- Meredith Willson for The Music Man (Contributing Layman)
- Herman B Wells (Alumni Achievement)
- A. Frank Martin and Grace F. Martin (Fraternity Service)

=== All awardees ===
Following is a list of all recipients of the award, from 1963 to the present.

1963–65
Morton Gould, Composition
Frank Simon, Concert Band
William Revelli, Concert Band
Eugene J. Weigel, Marching Band
Sigurd Raschèr, Artist Performer
Earl Kent, Industrial Research and Progress
Meredith Willson, Contributing Layman
Herman B. Wells, Alumni Achievement
A. Frank Martin, Fraternity Service
Grace F. Martin, Fraternity Service

1965–67
Karl King, Composition
Harold Bachman, Concert Band
Glenn C. Bainum, Marching Band
H. E. Nutt, Instrumental Music Education
Paul V. Yoder, Instrumental Music Education
Leonard Smith, Artist Performer
Guggenheim family of New York, Contributing Layman
F. Lee Bowling, Alumni Achievement
J. Lee Burke, Fraternity Service
William A. Scroggs, Fraternity Service

1967–69
Clarence Sawhill, Concert Band
Manley Whitcomb, Instrumental Music Education
Leonard Falcone, Artist Performer
Nels Vogel, Industrial Research and Progress
Adolph Ostwald, Contributing Layman
1969–71
Lucien Cailliet, Composition
Richard Franko Goldman, Concert Band
Jack K. Lee, Marching Band
Robert Arthur, Instrumental Music Education
Doc Severinsen, Artist Performer
Traugott Rohner, Industrial Research and Progress
Donald Moore, Fraternity Service

1971–73
Robert E. Jager, Composition
Mark Hindsley, Concert Band
William P. Foster, Marching Band
William Moffitt, Marching Band
Bertram Francis, Instrumental Music Education
Eugene Rousseau, Artist Performer
Nilo Harvey, Industrial Research and Progress
Forrest McAlister, Contributing Layman
D. O. Wiley, Fraternity Service
1975–77
Robert Russell Bennett, Composition
Hiram Henry, Instrumental Music Education
Robert Kamm, Contributing Layman

1977–79
Raymond Dvorak, Concert Band
Frederick Fennell, Concert Band
Colonel Arnald Gabriel, Concert Band
Harvey Phillips, Artist Performer

1979–81
Truman Crawford, Marching Band
John Long, Instrumental Music Education

1981–83
Al G. Wright, Concert Band and Marching Band

1983–85
Charles Carter, Composition
Richard Bowles, Instrumental Music Education
Louis Sudler, Contributing Layman

1985–87
Clare Grundman, Composition
Harry Begian, Concert Band
Colonel John R. Bourgeois, Concert Band
John Paynter, Concert Band

1987–89
W. Francis McBeth, Composition
Claude T. Smith, Composition
Fisher Tull, Composition
Ray Cramer, Instrumental Music Education

1989–91
Alfred Reed, Composition
Hugh McMillen, Concert Band, Alumni Achievement, and Fraternity Service
James K. Copenhaver, Instrumental Music Education
Stanley F. Michalski Jr., Instrumental Music Education
James G. Saied, Contributing Layman
Max Mitchell, Fraternity Service
Susan Mitchell, Fraternity Service

1991–93
James Barnes, Composition
H. Owen Reed, Composition
Kenneth G. Bloomquist, Concert Band
Richard Strange, Concert Band
Walter M. Chesnut, Instrumental Music Education
Thomas Henry Delaine, Instrumental Music Education
Emery L. Fears, Instrumental Music Education
Henry Levy, Instrumental Music Education
Stanley G. Finck, Fraternity Service

1993–95
H. Robert Reynolds, Concert Band
James Sudduth, Concert Band
Conrad Hutchinson Jr., Marching Band

1995–97
Frank B. Wickes, Concert Band
Don Wilcox, Concert Band
Richard Worthington, Concert Band
Kenneth M. Corbett, Fraternity Service

1997–99
James Croft, Concert Band
James Jacobsen, Instrumental Music Education
Elden Janzen, Instrumental Music Education
Gary Langford, Instrumental Music Education
Clifford Madsen, Instrumental Music Education

1999–2001
Frank Ticheli, Composition
Robert Foster, Concert Band
Gary Garner, Concert Band
John Whitwell, Concert Band
Keith Bearden, Marching Band
Robert "Coach" Fleming, Marching Band
Gary E. Smith, Marching Band
Frederick Hemke, Instrumental Music Education
Tim Lautzenheiser, Instrumental Music Education
Jim Cochrane, Industrial Research and Progress

2001–03
Ken Singleton, Instrumental Music Education
Melvin Miles Jr., Instrumental Music Education
Alfred Sergel III, Instrumental Music Education
Christopher Haughee, Fraternity Service

2003–05
Melborn Nixon, Instrumental Music Education

2005–07
Karel Husa, Composition
Donald Grantham, Composition
Craig Kirchoff, Concert Band
James F. Keene, Concert Band
Johnnie Vinson, Concert Band
Issac Greggs, Marching Band
Jack R. Anderson, Marching Band
Paul Droste, Instrumental Music Education
Bentley Shellahammer, Instrumental Music Education
Don McGinnis, Conducting
William Gora, Conducting
Steve West, Industry

2007–09
George N. Parks, Marching Band
Jon R. Woods, Marching Band
Scott E. Stowell, Fraternity Service
Joseph Hermann, Conducting

2009–11
Adam Gorb, Composition
Mark Camphouse, Composition
Joseph P. Missal, Concert Band
William V. Johnson, Concert Band
David Patrick Dunnigan, Marching Band
Julian White, Marching Band
David Gregory, Instrumental Music Education
Earl Dunn, Instrumental Music Education
Lt. Colonel Alan L. Bonner, Conducting
Michael Haithcock, Conducting
Jerry F. Junkin, Conducting
Mark Morette, Industry

2011–13
Paula Crider, Conducting
Eugene Migliaro Corporon, Conducting
William K. Wakefield, Concert Band
Wava Banes Henry, Fraternity Service

2013–15
Richard Floyd, Instrumental Music Education
Gary W. Hill, Conducting

2015–17
Malinda Matney, Fraternity Service
Michael Golemo, Conducting

2017–19
Julie Giroux, Composition
Alfred Watkins, Alumni Achievement
Gary D. Green, Conducting
Ray Lichtenwalter, Conducting
Dennis Zeisler, Conducting
Arthur Himmelberger, Conducting
Scott Weiss, Conducting

2019–21
Thomas P. Hannum, Marching Band
Brent Cannon, Fraternity Service
Daniel A. George, Fraternity Service

2021–23
Robert W. Smith, Composition
Mark Spede, Industry
Derrick Mills, Fraternity Service
Kirk Randazzo, Fraternity Service

2023–25
John Bradley McDavid, Marching Band

=== Multiple recipients ===
Hugh E. McMillen, former Director of Bands at the University of Colorado at Boulder and Past National President of Kappa Kappa Psi, has been awarded the medal for three causes: for concert band, alumni achievement, and fraternity service. Al G. Wright, Director of Bands Emeritus at Purdue University, is the only other person to receive the award in more than one category: concert band and marching band.
