= Arnald Gabriel =

American bandleader and conductor (born 1925)

Arnald D. Gabriel
- Born: Arnald Dominick Gabriel; May 31, 1925 (age 101); Cortland, New York, U.S.
- Military career
- Allegiance: United States
- Branch: United States Air Force
- Service years: 1964–1985
- Rank: Colonel
- Commands: United States Air Force Band
- The Stars and Stripes Forever John Phillip Sousa's "The Stars and Stripes Forever" performed by the United States Air Force Concert Band and the Singing Sergeants in 1965 conducted by COL Arnald D. Gabriel.

Colonel Arnald Dominick Gabriel (born May 31, 1925) is an American bandleader and conductor who was the former commander and conductor of the United States Air Force Band, United States Air Force Symphony Orchestra, and Singing Sergeants from 1964 to 1985. In 1990, he was named the first conductor emeritus of the United States Air Force Band and the 29th Infantry Division Band of the Virginia Army National Guard.

== Early life ==
Arnald Dominick Gabriel was born in Cortland, New York, on May 31, 1925. During World War II, he served as an infantryman (as a machine gunner) with the US Army's 29th Infantry Division in Europe. For his service in Europe he received two Bronze Star medals and the Combat Infantry Badge.

After leaving the Army, he worked at a canning factory as he was unable to go to college. His former high school band director paid for Gabriel to attend Ithaca College in 1946. He earned bachelor and Master of Science degrees in Music Education at Ithaca College.

== Career ==
Gabriel has conducted hundreds of major orchestras and bands, including the Mormon Tabernacle Choir, Puerto Rico, and Tatui São Paulo (Brazil) symphony orchestras, Carabiniere Band and Air Force Band (Italy), Band of the Royal Netherlands Marines, Staff Music Corps (Bonn, Germany), National Band of the Canadian Forces (Ottawa), National Intercollegiate Band, Dallas Wind Symphony, Gamagori Band and Tokyo Kosei Wind Orchestra (Japan).

== Personal life ==
Gabriel retired from the United States Air Force Band and the Air Force in February 1985.

He has four sons, one daughter, and thirteen grandchildren.

== Honors ==
Ret. COL Gabriel receives United States Air Force Exceptional Award (U.S. Air Force photo/Scott M. Ash) dated 24 May 2015

Gabriel's professional honors include the first Citation of Excellence awarded by the National Band Association, and Phi Mu Alpha Sinfonia's New Millennium Lifetime Achievement Award. He is also a recipient of the Kappa Kappa Psi Distinguished Service to Music Medal.

Gabriel was inducted into the National Band Association Hall of Fame of Distinguished Band Conductors, becoming the youngest person ever to receive this honor. He is also a past president of the prestigious American Bandmasters Association. In 2008, the US Air Force Band dedicated the Arnald D. Gabriel Hall in his honor.

In 1990, he was named the first conductor emeritus of the United States Air Force Band at DAR Constitution Hall in Washington, DC.

He is a professor emeritus of George Mason University.
