= Truman Crawford =

Colonel Truman W. "Tru" Crawford (USMC) (April 1, 1934 – March 3, 2003) was a music arranger, composer, and conductor for drum and bugle corps. He was the long-time commander and director of "The Commandant's Own," the United States Marine Drum and Bugle Corps after having previously served as musical director of the United States Air Force Drum and Bugle Corps.

== Biography ==
A native of Endicott, New York, Truman Crawford performed in a local fife and drum corps from the age of eight. He saw his first drum and bugle corps, the United States Air Force Drum and Bugle Corps of Bolling Air Force Base, Washington, D.C. while in high school. After graduating high school in 1953, Crawford auditioned for the Air Force corps and was accepted as a baritone bugler. He gained rapid promotion, becoming the unit's senior non-commissioned officer and musical director. As Glenn Miller had done with the Army Air Force Band during World War II, Crawford transformed the unit from a staid, martial music unit into a swinging, contemporary musical ensemble before the corps was disbanded in 1963.

Leaving the Air Force after the drum corps' demise, Crawford moved to Chicago, where he went to work in a music store. He continued to write arrangements for drum corps, many of which he had begun his involvement with while in the Air Force. He worked especially closely with the Chicago Royal Airs Drum and Bugle Corps, which in 1965, playing Crawford's arrangements, became the only drum corps to win the American Legion, Veterans of Foreign Wars, and Catholic Youth Organization National Championships in the same season. By 1967, Crawford was credited with writing arrangements performed by a great majority of the senior and junior drum and bugle corps in the United States, Canada, and Europe.

Colonel Truman Crawford conducting the USMC Drum and Bugle Corps.

Due to his reputation and popularity in the drum corps world, in 1966, Crawford was asked to join the United States Marine Drum and Bugle Corps as chief musical arranger. Reentering the service as an enlisted man, he was later commissioned as a lieutenant and became commander of the drum corps. During his thirty-year career in the United States Marine Corps, Crawford rose to the rank of colonel and was decorated with the Legion of Merit, the Navy Commendation Medal, and the Meritorious Service Medal among other honors. As he had done with the Air Force corps, Crawford made the Marine Corps corps into a smoothly swinging contemporary musical group. The Commandant's Own, under his direction, performed at the historic 1978 Camp David meeting of Egyptian President Anwar Sadat and Israeli Prime Minister Menachim Begin, causing Begin to comment, "What a marvelous art form." At the time of his retirement in 1996, Col. Crawford was the oldest Marine on active duty.

During his early years in the Marines, Crawford was also the drum major and musical director for the Yankee Rebels Senior Drum and Bugle Corps from Baltimore, Maryland. This corps won the American Legion Senior National Championship in 1969, 1970, and 1971. When the Royal Airs was resurrected as an alumni corps in 2002, he returned to that corps as musical arranger and sometime conductor.

Crawford was diagnosed with amyotrophic lateral sclerosis (ALS) (Lou Gehrig's disease) in 2002 and died at a hospital in Hershey, Pennsylvania from the effects of that disease on March 3, 2003. He was interred at Arlington National Cemetery, and was survived by his wife of forty-nine years, Lucille Ellis Crawford, five children, eight grandchildren, and four siblings.

== Honors ==
Truman Crawford was honored with membership in the Drum Corps International Hall of Fame, the World Drum Corps Hall of Fame, the Bands of America Hall of Fame, and the Maryland Drum and Bugle Corps Hall of Fame.

Crawford was a member of Kappa Kappa Psi, the National Honorary Band Fraternity and was awarded that organization's 1979-81 Distinguished Service to Music Medal for marching band.

On September 14, 2009, the new headquarters of the United States Marine Drum and Bugle Corps at the Marine Barracks, Washington, D.C. was dedicated as Colonel Truman W. Crawford Hall.
