= H. Robert Reynolds =

American conductor (1934–2026)

- Born: Harrah Robert Reynolds; April 10, 1934; Canton, Ohio, U.S.
- Died: January 30, 2026 (aged 91)
- Other names: Bob Reynolds, H Bob
- Education: University of Michigan, School of Music, Theatre & Dance
- Occupations: Conductor; Composer of contemporary classical music
- Years active: 1965–2026

Harrah Robert Reynolds (April 10, 1934 – January 30, 2026) was an American musician, conductor and academic. He was the principal conductor of the Wind Ensemble at the Thornton School of Music at the University of Southern California, where he held the H. Robert Reynolds Professorship in Wind Conducting.

== Career ==
Reynold's appointment at the University of Southern California followed his retirement, after 26 years, from the School of Music of the University of Michigan where he served as the Henry F. Thurnau Professor of Music, director of university bands, and director of the division of instrumental studies. In addition to these responsibilities, he was also, for nearly 30 years, the conductor of the Detroit Chamber Winds and Strings, which is made up primarily of members from the Detroit Symphony.

Reynolds conducted in Carnegie Hall and Lincoln Center (New York), Orchestra Hall (Chicago), Kennedy Center (Washington, D.C.), Powell Symphony Hall (St. Louis), Academy of Music (Philadelphia), and Walt Disney Concert Hall (Los Angeles). In Europe, he conducted the premiere of an opera for La Scala Opera (Milan, Italy), and concerts at the prestigious Maggio Musicale (Florence, Italy), the Tonhalle (Zurich, Switzerland), and at the Holland Festival in the Concertgebouw (Amsterdam, the Netherlands), as well as the 750th Anniversary of the City of Berlin. He has won the praise of numerous composers, including Aaron Copland, Karel Husa, György Ligeti, Darius Milhaud, Gunther Schuller, and many others for his interpretive conducting of their compositions.

Reynolds was awarded an honorary doctorate from Duquesne University, and, in addition, held degrees in music education and performance from the University of Michigan, where he was the conducting student of Elizabeth Green. He began his career in the public schools of Michigan and California (Anaheim HS) before beginning his university conducting at California State University at Long Beach and the University of Wisconsin, prior to his tenure at the University of Michigan.

Reynolds spent his summers conducting the Young Artists Wind Ensemble at the Boston University Tanglewood Institute. This program works closely with the Boston Symphony Orchestra and the Tanglewood Music Center. The group includes young musicians from all across North America, and consistently performs the music at the highest difficulty to the highest quality. He shared this responsibility with David Martins, director of Wind Ensembles at Boston University.

Reynolds died on January 30, 2026, at the age of 91.

== Awards and recognition ==
Reynolds was past president of the College Band Directors' National Association and the Big Ten Band Directors' Association. He received the highest national awards from Phi Mu Alpha, Phi Beta Mu, the National Band Association, and the American School Band Directors' Association, and he was awarded the Medal of Honor by the International Mid-West Band and Orchestra Clinic. Kappa Kappa Psi, the national band fraternity, awarded him the Distinguished Service to Music Medal. He is the recipient of a Special Tribute from the State of Michigan, and he was member of the National Awards Panel for the American Society of Composers, Authors, and Publishers (ASCAP) and in 2001 received a national award from this organization for his contributions to contemporary American music. He received the Citation of Merit from the Music Alumni Association of the University of Michigan for his contributions to the many students he influenced during his career and the Lifetime Achievement Award from the Michigan Band Alumni Association. He was also an Honorary Life Member of the Southern California School Band and Orchestra Association.

Many of his former students now hold major conducting positions at leading conservatories and universities, and several have been National Presidents of the College Band Directors National Association (CBDNA).
