= Otradov =

- Municipality
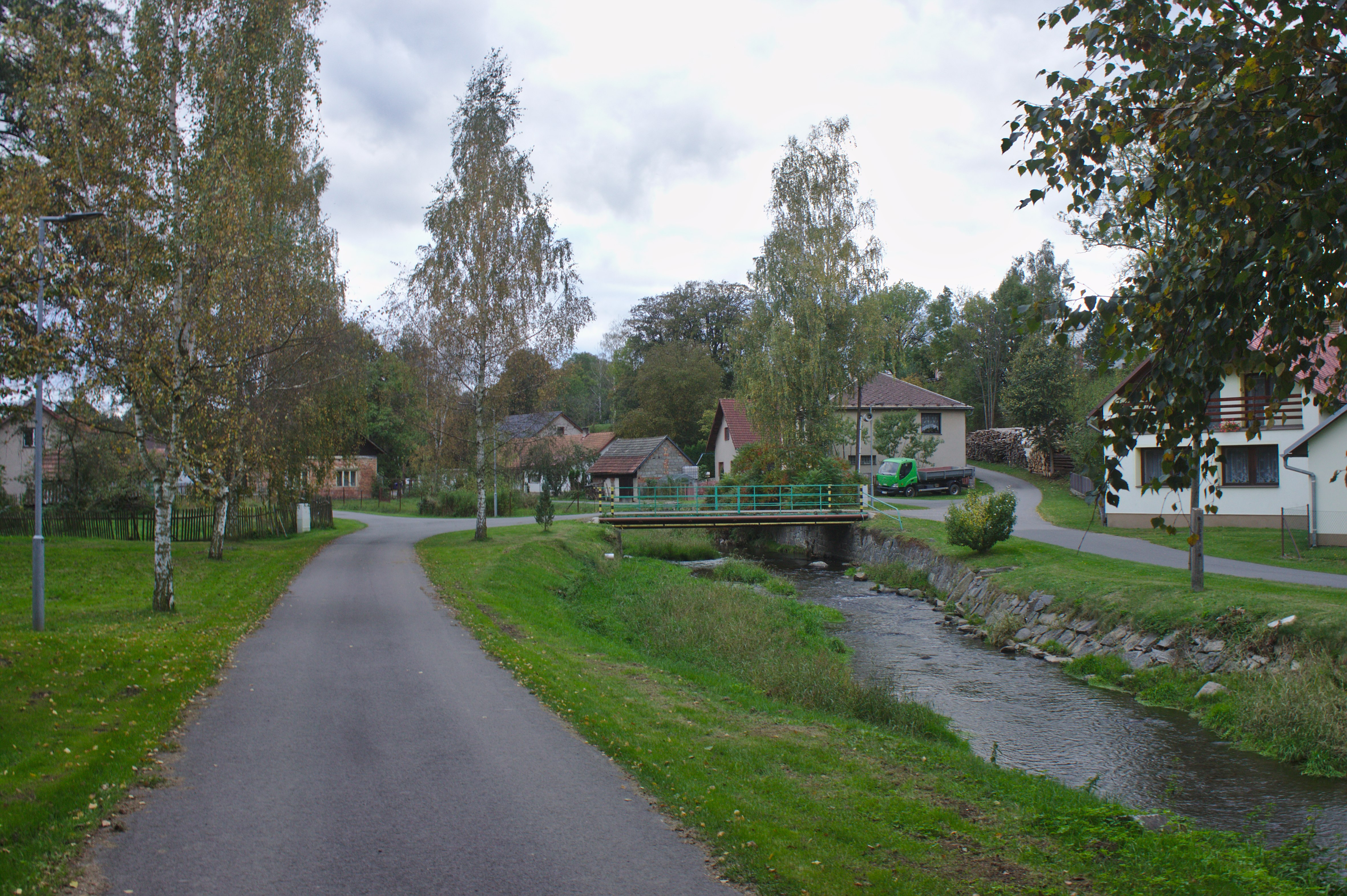
- Bridge over the Krounka River

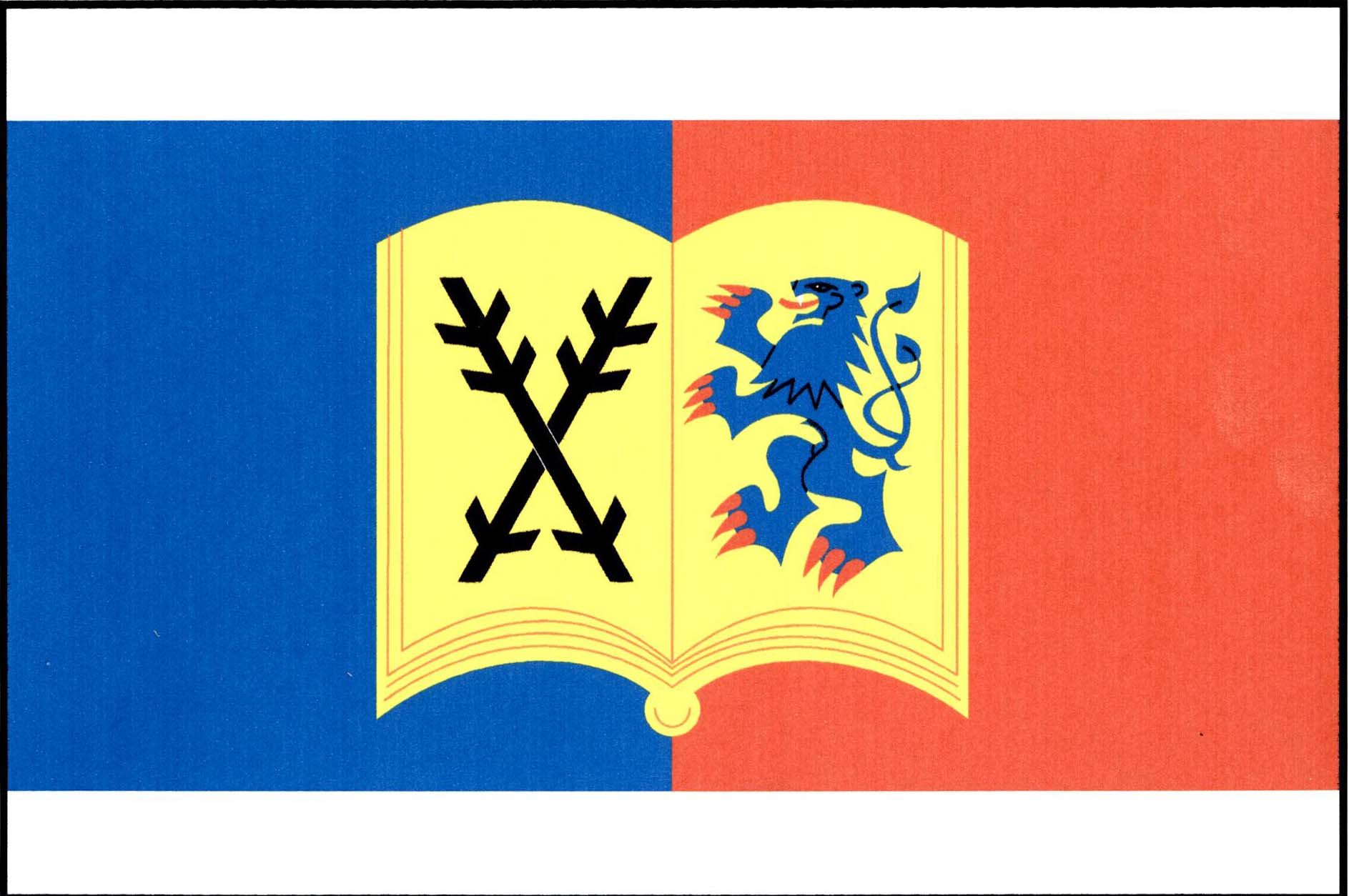
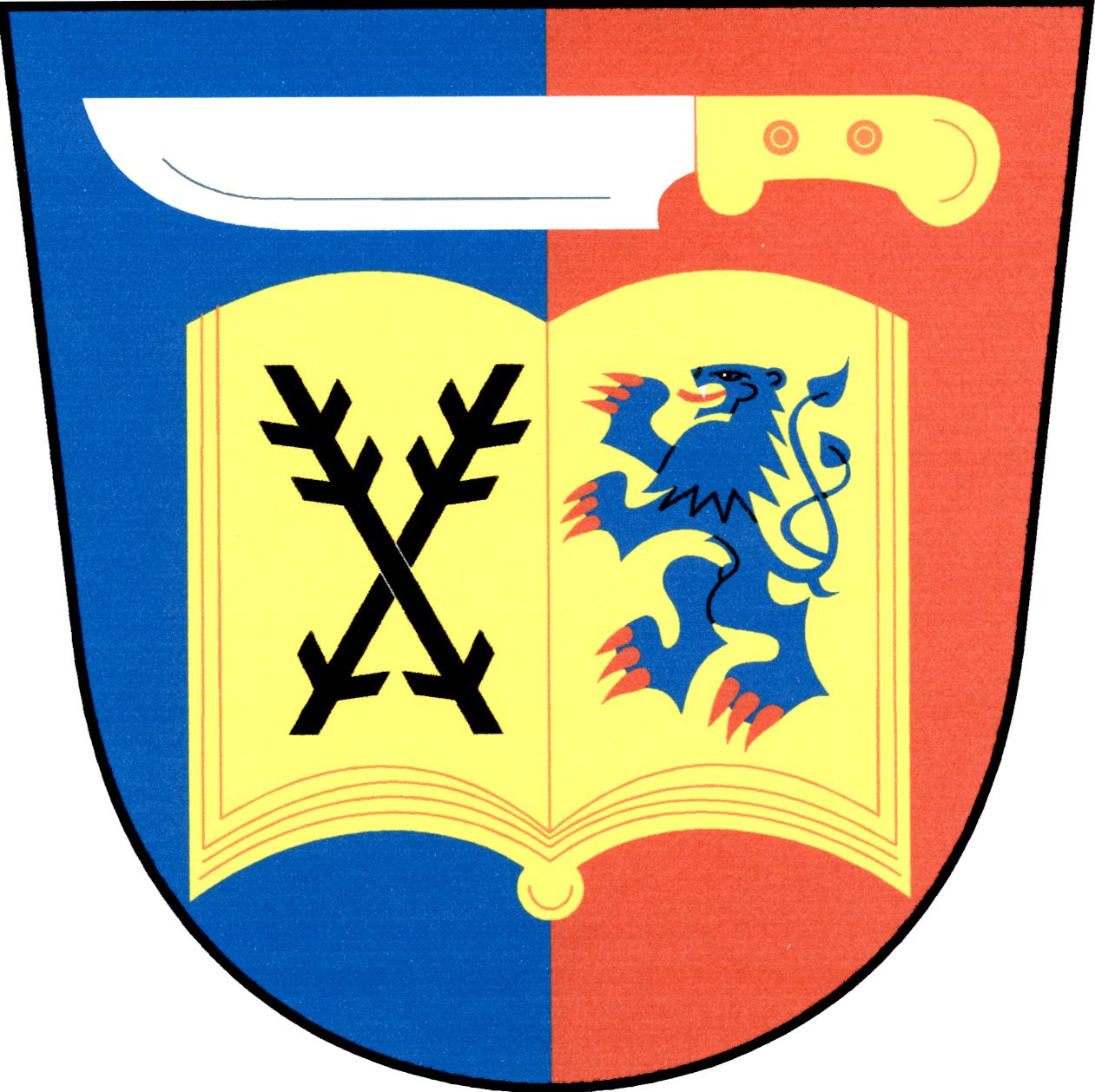
- Flag Coat of arms

- Location in the Czech Republic
- Coordinates: 49°47′36″N 16°2′37″E
- Country: Czech Republic
- Region: Pardubice
- District: Chrudim
- First mentioned: 1349

Area
  - Total: 5.54 km^{2} (2.14 sq mi)
- Elevation: 502 m (1,647 ft)

Population (2026-01-01)
  - Total: 279
  - Density: 50.4/km^{2} (130/sq mi)
- Time zone: UTC+1 (CET)
  - Summer (DST): UTC+2 (CEST)
- Postal code: 539 43
- Website: www.otradov.cz

Otradov is a municipality and village in Chrudim District in the Pardubice Region of the Czech Republic. It has about 300 inhabitants.

== History ==
The first written mention of Otradov is from 1349. Until 1995, it was a municipal part of Krouna. Since 1996, it has been a separate municipality.

== Demographics ==
Historical population
Year	Pop.	±%
1869	599	—
1880	570	−4.8%
1890	535	−6.1%
1900	535	+0.0%
1910	553	+3.4%
1921	558	+0.9%
1930	538	−3.6%
1950	405	−24.7%
1961	427	+5.4%
1970	392	−8.2%
1980	368	−6.1%
1991	317	−13.9%
2001	322	+1.6%
2011	282	−12.4%
2021	276	−2.1%
Source: Censuses
