= Claude T. Smith =

American conductor (1932–1987)

- Born: Claude Thomas Smith; March 14, 1932; Monroe City, Missouri
- Died: December 13, 1987 (aged 55)
- Occupations: Conductor, composer, educator
- Instruments: Cornet, french horn

Claude Thomas Smith (March 14, 1932 – December 13, 1987) was an American band conductor, composer, and music educator. His compositions include Flight, adopted as the "Official March" of the National Air and Space Museum of the Smithsonian Institution, and Eternal Father, Strong to Save, commissioned in 1975, that premiered at a Kennedy Center celebration of the 50th anniversary of the United States Navy Band.

== Biography ==
Smith was born in Monroe City, Missouri, on March 14, 1932. His grandmother, a piano teacher and organist, influenced his interest in music, and he took up the cornet in eighth grade. He learned to conduct in high school and with a local Boy Scout band.

He switched to the horn during his time under director K.K. Anderson at Central Methodist College in Fayette, Missouri. He joined the 371st US Army Band in 1952 during the Korean War. After marrying Maureen Morrison in 1952, he finished his Bachelor of Music Education degree in 1958 at the University of Kansas. He began to compose during his time at KU.

Smith died on December 13, 1987, after conducting a Christmas concert. His wife, Maureen, daughter, Pam Smith Kelly and son-in-law, Jim Kelly, founded Claude T. Smith Publications, Inc. in 1993.

== Music educator ==
Smith worked as a music educator at public schools in Nebraska and Missouri. In 1976, he took a faculty position at Southwest Missouri State University; he conducted the University Symphony Orchestra at that institution. He left in 1978 to move to Raytown, Missouri, where his main occupation was composition. He worked as an educational consultant for Wingert-Jones Publications, who published many of his compositions, and worked as a staff writer for Jenson Publications.

== Composer ==
Claude T. Smith is remembered for his composition work. He completed over 110 compositions for band, 12 orchestral works, and 15 choral pieces. The following excerpt from the finding aid of his collection at the University of Maryland, College Park describes his style:

His pitch language is essentially analogous to Western common practice traditions, with particular emphasis on striking melodic material and bass lines that articulate functional harmonic progressions. Multiple scholars have noted, however, that toward the end of his life, Smith was using "dissonances" with increasing frequency and postulated that had he continued writing, this aspect would have become a more pervasive characteristic of his music. Smith is perhaps best known for his rhythmic practice, particularly introducing asymmetrical meters into the band idiom in 1964 with the 7/8 and oddly subdivided 9/8 measures of Emperata Overture. Some of Smith's other compositions feature continually changing meters, such as the 3/4 – 6/8 – 1/4 – 7/8 – 3/4 metrical sequence found in Acclamation. Smith is also recognized for using triplet quarter notes and hemiola techniques in many of his pieces. Taking these two facets in combination, it is apparent that through the majority of his career, Smith's use of pitch was firmly rooted in 19th-century practice, while his rhythmic syntax owed much to certain composers of the early to mid 20th-century such as Igor Stravinsky and Aaron Copland. A final notion that is frequently cited regarding Smith's music is his attention to all ensemble lines; partly stemming from his pedagogical perspective, Smith continually strove to write engaging parts for each member of the ensembles for which he composed, a facet that is particularly apparent in his percussion writing.

— Claude Thomas Smith Collection, Special Collections in Performing Arts at the University of Maryland, College Park

Smith was a member of ASCAP and the American Bandmasters Association. He was recognized through a resolution from the Missouri House of Representatives in 1976, received the Hall of Fame Award from the Missouri Bandmasters Association in 1988, and was awarded the Distinguished Service to Music Medal from Kappa Kappa Psi in 1989. His composition Flight is the "official march" of the Smithsonian Institution's National Air and Space Museum. Other works, including Eternal Father, Strong to Save; Emperata Overture; Variations on a Hymn by Louis Bourgeois; Incidental Suite; Ballad and Presto Dance: for Solo Tuba; and Variations on a Revolutionary War Hymn are still widely performed.

== Sources ==
- Claude T. Smith score manuscripts. Special Collections and University Archives, University of Maryland.
- "Claude T. Smith Publications".
