= Mary Jeanne van Appledorn =

American composer and pianist (1927–2014)

Mary Jeanne van Appledorn (October 2, 1927 – December 12, 2014) was an American composer of contemporary classical music and pianist.

== Education and career ==
Born in Holland, Michigan, van Appledorn attended the Eastman School of Music in Rochester, New York, where she studied piano and theory with Bernard Rogers and Alan Hovhaness. She received her Bachelor of Music in 1948, her Masters of Music in 1950, and her Ph.D. in music theory from Eastman in 1966. She also completed post-doctoral studies in computer-synthesized sound at MIT in 1982. She was a member of the music faculty of Texas Tech University from 1950 until 2008. She was the Paul Whitfield Horn Professor of Music from 1989 to 2000.

She composed numerous works for various instrumental combinations and also composed computer music. She had work commissioned by the Music Teachers National Association and National Intercollegiate Bands.

Her surname is Dutch (from the town of Apeldoorn, though in Americanized spelling); her great-grandparents emigrated to the United States from the Netherlands. She visited Apeldoorn in 1982. She died in 2014 in Lubbock, Texas.

== Musical style ==
Her works are generally tonal, although she also used the twelve-tone technique, and she frequently utilized string piano techniques in her piano music. Her music has been recorded by the Opus One and Golden Crest labels, and her scores are published by numerous publishers.

== Awards and honors ==
- Premier Prix
- Dijon
- Texas Composors Guild
- ASCAP Standard Panel Awards

== Selected works ==
=== Orchestral ===
- Concerto brevis, pf (orch) (1954)
- A Choreographic Ov. (band) (1957)
- Conc. (trumpet) (1960)
- Passacaglia and Chorale (1973)
- Lux 'Legend of Sankta Lucia' (band, hp, perc, handbells) (1981)
- Terrestrial Music (vn, pf, str) (1992)
- Cycles of Moon and Tides (band) (1995)
- Rhapsody (vn, orch) (1996)
- Music of Enchantment (Amerindian fl, str, perc) (1997)

=== Chamber and solo ===
- Cellano Rhapsody (vc) (1948)
- Burlesca (brass, perc, pf) (1951)
- Patterns (5 hn) (1956)
- Matrices (sax, pf) (1979)
- Cacophony (wind, perc, toys) (1980)
- Liquid Gold (sax, pf) (1982)
- 4 Duos (2 a sax) (1985)
- 4 Duos (va, vc) (1986)
- Sonic Mutation (hp) (1987)
- Cornucopia (tpt) (1988)
- Sonatina (cl, pf) (1988)
- Ayre (cl/sav ens, viol ens, str) (1989)
- Three for Two (2 rec/fl) (1989)
- Windsongs (brass qnt) (1991)
- Incantations (tpt, pf) (1992)
- Atmosphere (trbn ens) (1993)
- Postcards to John (gui) (1993)
- Rhapsody (tpt, hp) (1993)
- Reeds Afire (cl, bn) (1994)
- Sound the Tpt! (tpt, org) (1994)
- Trio Italiano (tpt, hn, b trbn) (1995)
- Passages (trbn, pf) (1996)
- A Native American Mosaic (Amerindian fl) (1997)
- Incantations (ob, pf) (1998)
- Passages II (trbn, perc) (1998)
- Miniatures, for trombone quartet (2002)

=== Piano ===
- Contrasts (pf) (1947)
- Set of Five (pf) (1953)
- Sonnet (org) (1959)
- 3 Pf Pieces (1972)
- 6 Pf Pieces (1972)
- Scenes from Pecos Country (pf) (1972)
- Elegy for Pepe (pf) (1982)
- A Liszt Fantasie (pf) (1984)
- Freedom of Youth (spkr, synth) (1986)
- Set of Seven (dance score) (pf) (1988)
- Parquet musique (hpd) (1990)
- Variations on Jerusalem the Golden (org) (1996)

=== Carillon ===
- Suite (1976)
- A Celestial Clockwork (1983)
- Caprice (1988)
- Tower Music (1990)
- Skybells (1991)

=== Vocal ===
==== Choral ====
- Tears (1952)
- 2 Shakespeare Songs (chorus, pf) (1953)
- Peter Quince at the Clavier (spkr, female vv, fl, ob, hn, pf) (1958)
- Darest Thou Nos, O Soul (female vv, org) (1975)
- West Texas Suite (chorus, band, perc) (1976)
- Rising Night After Night (spkr, S, T, Bar, 2 choruses, orch) (1978)
- Spirit Divine (chorus, org) (1986)
- Love Divine All Loves Excelling (SATB, org) (1988)
- Les hommes vidés (SATB) (1994)

==== Solo ====
- I Hear America Singing (W. Whitman) (1v, pf) (1952)
- Communiqué (1v, pf) (1960)
- Azaleas (Bar fl, pf) (1980)
- Missa brevis (1v, tpt, org) (1987)

== Publications ==
- Keyboard, singing, and dictation manual (1968)
