= Krouna train accident =

1995 railway incident in the Czech Republic

Details
- Date: 24 June 1995
- Location: Krouna
- Coordinates: 49°47′18″N 16°1′59″E
- Country: Czech Republic
- Line: Svitavy – Žďárec u Skutče (line nr. 261)
- Operator: Czech Railways
- Incident type: Collision

Statistics
- Trains: 2
- Passengers: 23
- Deaths: 19
- Injured: 4
Route map
Accident location in the Czech Republic

The Krouna train accident was a rail accident that happened on 24 June 1995 near Krouna, Pardubice Region, Czech Republic. With 19 dead, it was the deadliest rail accident of the 1990s in the Czech Republic and one of the worst rail disasters in Czech history.

A part of a freight train which was not properly braked and secured got loose during shunting at Čachnov station. Four cars picked speed (estimated to be 100 km/h) on a long descent and collided head-on with oncoming single class 810 diesel car. At that time, engine drivers were not equipped with wireless communication, so there was no way to warn the crew and passengers in time.
