= Keith Wilson (musician) =

American classical clarinetist, teacher, and arranger

Keith L. Wilson (1916 – June 2, 2013) was an American classical musician. He was a clarinetist, teacher, and conductor.

== Career ==
Wilson was appointed to the faculty of the Yale School of Music, New Haven, Connecticut, in 1946. He served as director of the Yale Bands until 1972. He later became associate dean of the School of Music and director of the Norfolk Summer School of Music. In February 1956 he led members of the Yale Concert Band in the first documented performance of "Set No. 1, Movement V, 'Calcium Light Night'" by composer Charles Ives. He retired in 1987 at the age of 70.

"In 1943 while teaching at Yale University, composer Paul Hindemith composed Symphonic Metamorphoses on Themes by Carl Maria von Weber for symphony orchestra. His arrangement has become a cornerstone of the concert band repertoire." (Smith, Norman. Program Notes for Band. pg.292) His last appearance as soloist was the Concertino for Clarinet by Carl Maria von Weber, with the Yale Concert Band (Thomas C. Duffy, Music Director) on 6 December 1985. His last chamber music appearance was 15 July 1990 playing Béla Bartók's Contrasts for clarinet, violin and piano at the Norfolk Chamber Music Festival ion Norfolk, Connecticut.

Wilson's students included

- Derek Bermel (clarinetist, composer)
- Max Christie (clarinetist)
- Daniel Gilbert (clarinetist, formerly Cleveland Orchestra, teacher University of Michigan)
- Walter Hekster (clarinetist, composer)
- William Hudson (clarinetist, conductor)
- David Irwin (clarinetist)
- Mitch Leigh (composer)
- Eric Mandat (clarinetist, composer)
- Peter Pastreich (former executive director San Francisco Symphony)
- Richard Stoltzman (clarinetist)
- Joaquin Valdepeñas (clarinetist Toronto Symphony)

== Reception ==
In 1977 Mitch Leigh and others at the Yale School of Music established the Keith Wilson scholarship, to be awarded "to an outstanding major in wind instrument playing." On his retirement in 1987, the Yale School of Music commissioned a piece in his honor: "Songs of Sea and Sky" by Tasmanian/Australian composer Peter Sculthorpe. In 1999 he was awarded the Sanford Medal, the Yale School of Music's highest honor, and the Gustav Stoeckel Award, which honors faculty who have contributed to the life of the School of Music. Robert Blocker, Dean of the school, described Wilson as "one of Yale's most outstanding professors" and "the embodiment of all the Yale School of Music stands for and hopes to be." He was selected to conduct the National Intercollegiate Band in 1967.
