= Walter Hekster =

- Born: 29 March 1937; Amsterdam, Netherlands
- Died: 31 December 2012 (aged 75); Amsterdam, Netherlands
- Occupations: Composer, clarinetist, conductor

Walter Hekster (29 March 1937 – 31 December 2012) was a Dutch composer, clarinetist and conductor of classical music, specialising in contemporary classical music.

== Biography ==
Hekster graduated from the Amsterdam Academy of Music in 1961 studying composition with Ton de Leeuw and clarinet with Bram de Wilde. Upon his graduation he studied clarinet with Keith Wilson and composition with Mel Powell at Yale University, where he received a Master of Music in 1963. In 1966 he studied with Roger Sessions in Tanglewood.

In the meantime he performed as a clarinetist in the Netherlands Wind Ensemble and the Connecticut Symphony Orchestra.

In 1965 he accepted an appointment for professor of clarinet and composition at Brandon University in Manitoba, which he held until 1971. There he started conducting the Brandon Chamber Orchestra.

In 1971 he studied sonology at the University of Utrecht. He then taught at the music conservatories of Enschede, Arnhem, and Groningen until 1990. With the Rosetti Woodwind Quintet, Quartetto di Fiati, Ensemble '80, and the Circle Ensemble, he performed throughout Europe and the United States.

Walter Hekster was an extremely productive composer, creating music for a wide range of orchestra and chamber music settings. The Dutch not-for-profit publishing house Donemus published 134 of his works.

Hekster was married from 1962 to the US-born and Yale-educated bassoon player Alice Hekster-van Leuvan. The couple had two children, Ben Hekster and Suzy Hekster.

== Selected works ==
- The Fog, Chamber Opera in one act (1987); libretto by Lewis Turco
- Derivations for piano (1972)
- Diverties for flute, clarinet, horn, bassoon and piano (1970)
- Occurrence for viola solo (1969)
- Parts of a World for viola and orchestra (1976)
- Pentagram for flute, oboe, clarinet, horn and bassoon (1971)
- Piano Sonata (1966)
- Studies in Spatial Notation (1972)
- Towards Dawn for viola and piano (2001)
- Trio for clarinet, viola and piano (1990)
- Windows for double bass solo (1971)

== Discography ==
=== Albums ===
- Summer's End (Emergo, 2002)

=== Collections with other composers ===
- Piano Sonata on Bart Berman, piano (Golf, 1978)
- Songs of the Japanese on Conservatory of Twente (Cemtac, 1988)
- Eclipse on Ereprijs Ensemble (Klimop, 1989)
- Harmonologue on Dirk Luijmes (Haast, 2003)
