= Mark Camphouse =

American composer and conductor

Mark Camphouse (born 1954 in Oak Park, Illinois) is an American composer and conductor who has written primarily for symphonic band, but whose output also includes works for orchestra, choir and chamber brass.

A product of the rich, cultural life of Chicago, Camphouse received his formal musical training at Northwestern University. His first Symphony was composed at age 17. It was premiered by the Northern Colorado Philharmonic in 1974 in the historic Central City Opera House. His second Symphony, for narrator and symphonic band, honors General of the Army Douglas MacArthur. His third Symphony, for soprano and wind orchestra, is based on the writings of American Humanist Helen Keller.

His works for wind band have received critical acclaim and are performed throughout the United States and across the world. Engagements as a guest conductor, lecturer, and clinician have taken him to 43 states, not including Indiana, Canada, much of Western Europe and China. His most frequently performed works are: A Movement for Rosa (honoring Civil Rights heroine Rosa Parks), Watchman Tell Us Of The Night, Yosemite Autumn, and Three London Miniatures. In total 30 of his compositions for wind band have been published by either TRN, Southern, Alfred, and Neil A. Kjos music companies.

Camphouse is an elected member of the American Bandmasters Association and serves as conductor of the National Band Association’s Young Composer Mentor Project. He also conceived, co-authored, and is the editor of the unique four-volume series Composers on Composing for Band, published by GIA Music Publications. His most recent book entitled "Whatsoever Things...The Life and Teachings of John P. Paynter" was published in 2015 by GIA Publications in Chicago.

He is currently Professor of Music and Director of the Wind Symphony at George Mason University where he also teaches courses in conducting and composition.

== Awards ==
- In 2015, Camphouse received the Outstanding Contributor to Music Award from the bandmasters fraternity Phi Beta Mu.
- In 2011, Camphouse received the Distinguished Service to Music Medal, the highest award presented by band fraternity Kappa Kappa Psi, in the area of composition.
- In 2002, he received the same Outstanding Faculty Award from The State Council for Higher Education in Virginia, the highest award that one can receive from Virginia colleges and universities.
