= A. Frank Martin =

American educational administrator

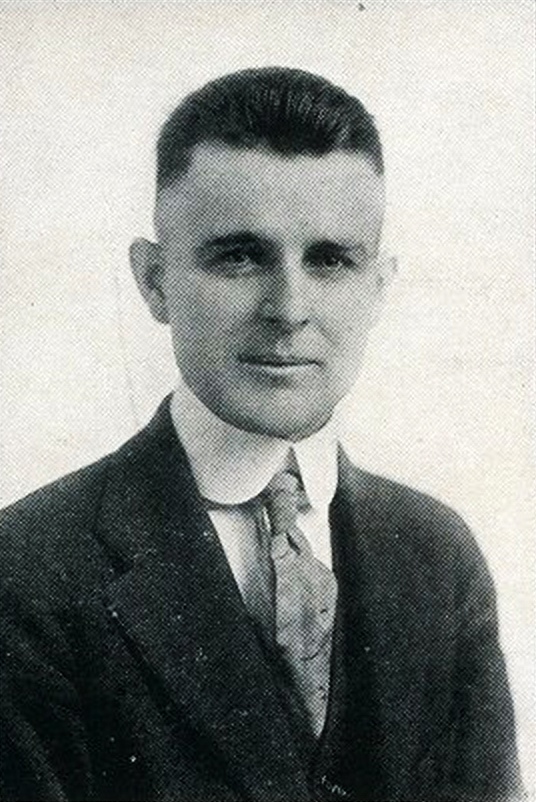
- A. Frank Martin, 1920
- Born: Andrew Franklin Martin; December 7, 1894; Akins, Oklahoma, U.S.
- Died: June 9, 1982 (aged 87); Stillwater, Oklahoma, U.S.
- Resting place: Fairlawn Cemetery in Stillwater, Oklahoma, U.S.
- Occupation: Educational administration
- Known for: Founding Father and first Grand President of Kappa Kappa Psi fraternity
- Spouse: Grace Faye Aikins (m. 1919)
- Children: Mildred Martin; Frances Martin Lumly; Major A. Frank Martin Jr.
- Awards: Distinguished Service to Music Medal; Honorary Life Grand President of Kappa Kappa Psi; Life Member, Kappa Kappa Psi Board of Trustees

Signature
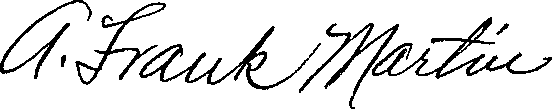

Andrew Franklin Martin (December 7, 1894 – June 9, 1982), born in Akins, Oklahoma, was a saxophonist, a bandmaster and an educational administrator and one of ten founding members of Kappa Kappa Psi, National Honorary Band Fraternity.

He was an education student at Oklahoma A&M College in the class of 1920. In 1916, Martin joined the Chi Alpha social club which was formed explicitly to petition for a charter of Lambda Chi Alpha. The Alpha-Eta Zeta of Lambda Chi Alpha was established on the campus of Oklahoma A&M on September 15, 1917.

Beyond Kappa Kappa Psi, Martin was the Managing Editor of the 1920 Redskin yearbook, a Lambda Chi Alpha delegate to the local Interfraternity Council, a member of the student senate, the vice president of the education society, a member of the YMCA cabinet, and social editor of the school newspaper Orange and Black.

== Kappa Kappa Psi ==
Martin was the president of the Oklahoma State A&M band in 1919 when William A. Scroggs, a member of the band, approached him with plans for an honorary band fraternity. Martin agreed to help with the fraternity's creation and was selected, along with Scroggs and eight other members of the band, to serve as a founding member of the fraternity by band director Bohumil Makovsky. At the first meeting of the fraternity, Martin was elected vice president of the chapter and was later elected Grand President when the men began planning the national organization.

Martin served as chairman of the ritual committee of the new fraternity and did much work for the third degree of ritual. Martin also served on the degree oaths committee.

In 1939, Martin became the National Executive Secretary of the fraternity, a position he held until 1964. He and his wife Grace received the Distinguished Service to Music Medal in 1965 for their service to the fraternity. In the same year, Martin was made a life member of the board of trustees.

In 1984, Kappa Kappa Psi established the A. Frank Martin Award to recognize regionally-known band directors who have made significant contributions to the band field.

In 1999, Tau Beta Sigma renamed the award given to the outstanding chapter in the nation during the biennium to the Grace and A. Frank Martin Chapter Leadership Award, in honor of the Martins' help in getting Tau Beta Sigma operating.

== Personal life ==
Martin married Grace Faye Aikins in Pawnee City, Nebraska, on August 12, 1919. The couple had three children: Andrew Franklin Martin Jr., Frances Martin, and Mildred Martin.

Andrew F. Martin Jr. was born June 11, 1920, and was a Major in the United States Air Force. Martin Jr. died on December 1, 1954, in an accident off Okinawa and is buried in Arlington National Cemetery.

Frances was a charter member of the Alpha chapter of Tau Beta Sigma at Oklahoma State and served as the sorority's fourth National President from 1951 to 1953.

A. Frank Martin died on June 9, 1982, and is buried at Fairlawn Cemetery in Stillwater.
