= William A. Scroggs =

American honor society founder (1896–1984)

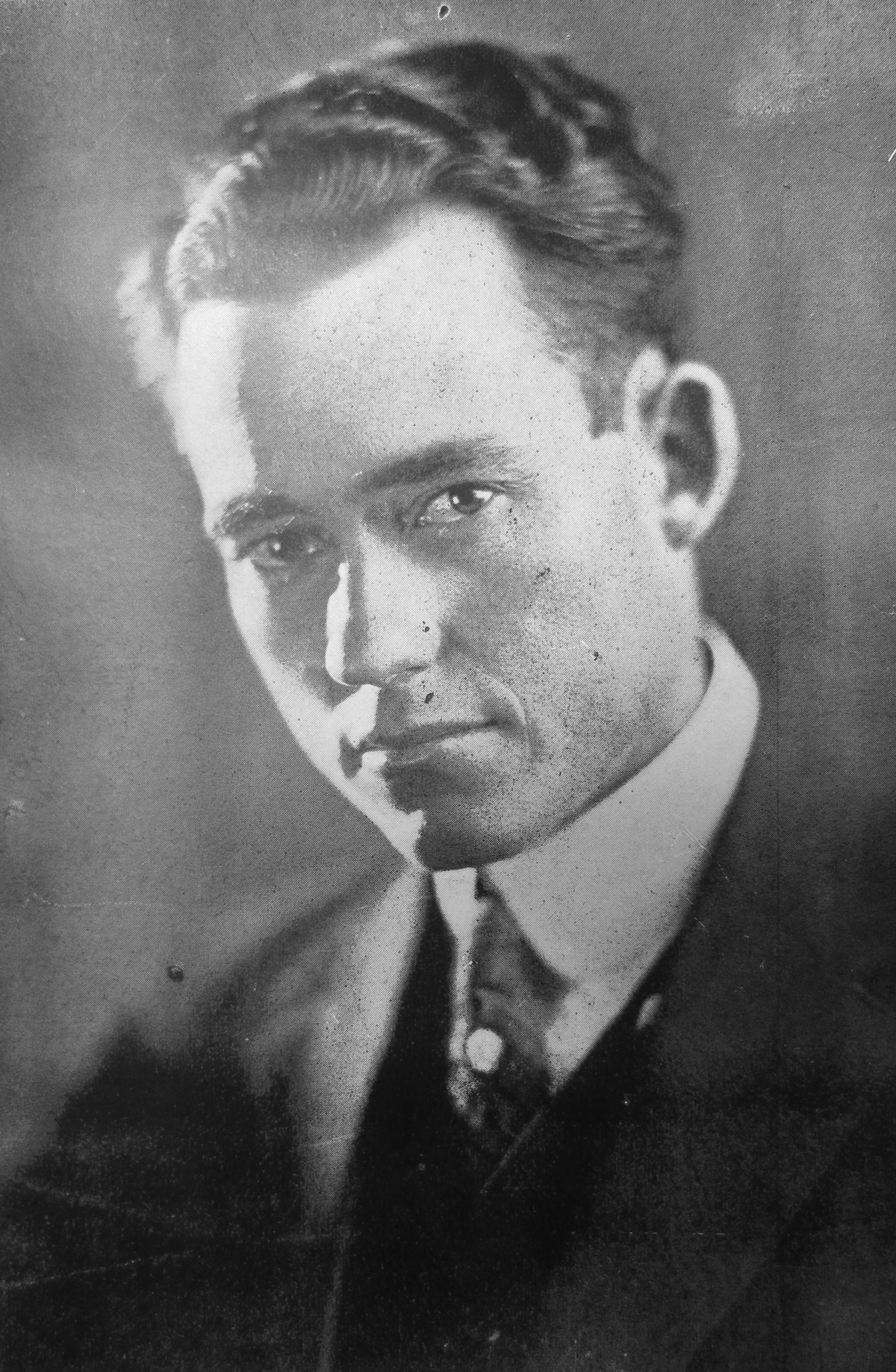
- William A. Scroggs
- Born: William Alexander Scroggs; November 27, 1896; Stillwater, Oklahoma
- Died: March 14, 1984 (aged 87); San Diego, California
- Resting place: Fairlawn Cemetery in Stillwater, Oklahoma
- Occupation: Insurance agent
- Known for: Founding Father and first President of the Alpha chapter of Kappa Kappa Psi fraternity
- Spouse: Eula T. Washington (m. 1929)
- Children: Bill Scroggs Jr. Susan Scroggs
- Awards: Honorary Life Grand President of Kappa Kappa Psi; Distinguished Service to Music Medal

Signature
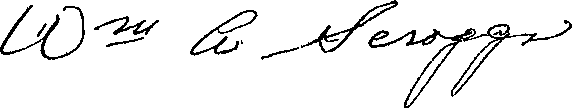

William Alexander Scroggs (November 27, 1896 – March 14, 1984), born in Stillwater, Oklahoma, was an insurance agent and Founder of Kappa Kappa Psi, National Honorary Band Fraternity.

He was a commerce and marketing student at Oklahoma A&M College in the class of 1922, and was a cornet player in the A&M band.

Beyond Kappa Kappa Psi, Scroggs was a member of Alpha Kappa Psi business fraternity, a member of Delta Sigma Alpha agricultural fraternity (now called Collegiate 4-H), and president of the college orchestra.

== Kappa Kappa Psi ==
In 1919, Scroggs, a member of the Oklahoma A&M band, approached band president A. Frank Martin with plans for an honorary band fraternity. Martin agreed to help with the fraternity's creation and was selected, along with Scroggs and eight other members of the band, to serve as a founding member of the fraternity by band director Bohumil Makovsky. At the first meeting of the fraternity, Scroggs was elected President of the local chapter and elected Grand Editor and Assistant Secretary and Treasurer of the national organization.

Scroggs served as a member of the constitution and bylaws committee of the new fraternity.

In 1947, Scroggs conducted the first piece ever performed by the National Intercollegiate Band: "Semper Fidelis" by John Philip Sousa. At the 1947 National Convention, Scroggs abdicated his succession to the office of Grand President, having presided over the 1922 convention in the absence of Martin. He was honored by the delegation by being named the first Honorary Life Grand President of the Fraternity.

In 1957, a committee led by Scroggs at that year's National Convention established the William A. Scroggs Founder's Trophy, an award that is given to the most outstanding chapter in the nation every biennium. He received the Distinguished Service to Music Medal in 1967 for his service to the fraternity.

== Personal life ==
Scroggs married Eula T. Washington on August 29, 1929. The couple had two children: William Alexander Scroggs Jr. and Susan Scroggs.

William Scroggs died on March 14, 1984, in La Mesa, California. He was originally buried at Greenwood Memorial Park in San Diego. On October 25, 2019, he, along with his wife and son, were reburied in Fairlawn Cemetery in Stillwater, Oklahoma.
