= Krouna =

- Municipality
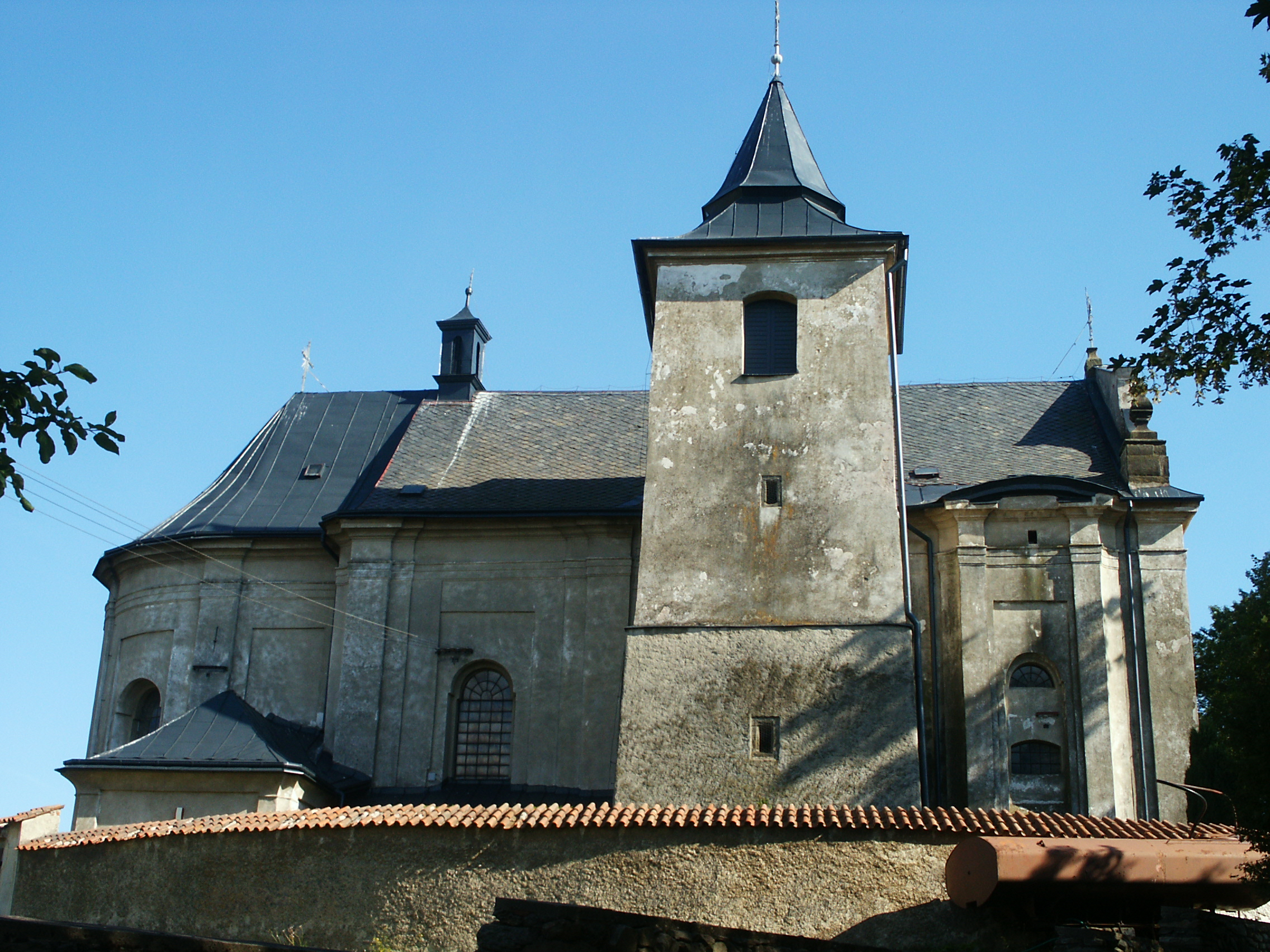
- Church of Saint Martin

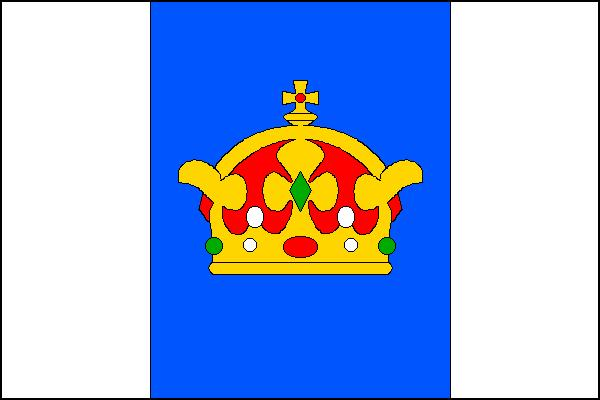
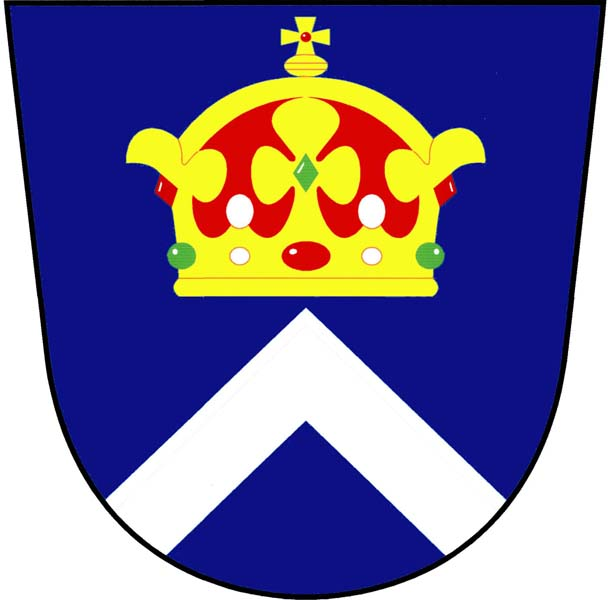
- Flag Coat of arms

- Location in the Czech Republic
- Coordinates: 49°46′21″N 16°1′36″E
- Country: Czech Republic
- Region: Pardubice
- District: Chrudim
- First mentioned: 1349

Area
  - Total: 34.37 km^{2} (13.27 sq mi)
- Elevation: 530 m (1,740 ft)

Population (2026-01-01)
  - Total: 1,399
  - Density: 40.70/km^{2} (105.4/sq mi)
- Time zone: UTC+1 (CET)
  - Summer (DST): UTC+2 (CEST)
- Postal codes: 539 01, 539 43, 539 44, 569 82
- Website: www.krouna.cz

Krouna is a municipality and village in Chrudim District in the Pardubice Region of the Czech Republic. It has about 1,400 inhabitants.

== Administrative division ==
Krouna consists of six municipal parts (in brackets population according to the 2021 census):

- Krouna (953)
- Čachnov (60)
- Františky (43)
- Oldřiš (114)
- Ruda (14)
- Rychnov (195)

== Etymology ==
The initial German name of the local watercourse was Grûna (from Central German grûn = 'green'). This name was transferred to the settlement. It was then transcribed to Czech as Kruna (first documented in 1392) and Krauna (from the 15th century). From 1886, the name Krouna has been used.

== Geography ==
Krouna is located about 25 kilometres (16 mi) southeast of Chrudim and 34 km (21 mi) southeast of Pardubice. The western part of the municipal territory lies in the Iron Mountains and the eastern part lies in the Upper Svratka Highlands. The highest point is at 735 m (2,411 ft) above sea level. The Chrudimka River originates in the woods in the southern part of the municipal territory. About two thirds of the territory lie within the Žďárské vrchy Protected Landscape Area.

== History ==
The first written mention of Krouna is from 1349.

The municipality is known for the Krouna train accident, in which 19 people died, making it one of the deadliest train crashes in Czech history.

== Demographics ==
Historical population

| Year | Pop. | ±% |
|---|---|---|
| 1869 | 2,990 | — |
| 1880 | 3,131 | +4.7% |
| 1890 | 3,074 | −1.8% |
| 1900 | 3,034 | −1.3% |
| 1910 | 3,017 | −0.6% |

| Year | Pop. | ±% |
|---|---|---|
| 1921 | 2,964 | −1.8% |
| 1930 | 3,071 | +3.6% |
| 1950 | 2,101 | −31.6% |
| 1961 | 2,144 | +2.0% |
| 1970 | 1,864 | −13.1% |

| Year | Pop. | ±% |
|---|---|---|
| 1980 | 1,577 | −15.4% |
| 1991 | 1,407 | −10.8% |
| 2001 | 1,370 | −2.6% |
| 2011 | 1,353 | −1.2% |
| 2021 | 1,379 | +1.9% |

Source: Censuses

== Transport ==
The I/34 road (heading from Svitavy to Havlíčkův Brod and further to České Budějovice) runs through the municipality.

Krouna is located on the railway line Svitavy–Žďárec u Skutče.

== Sights ==
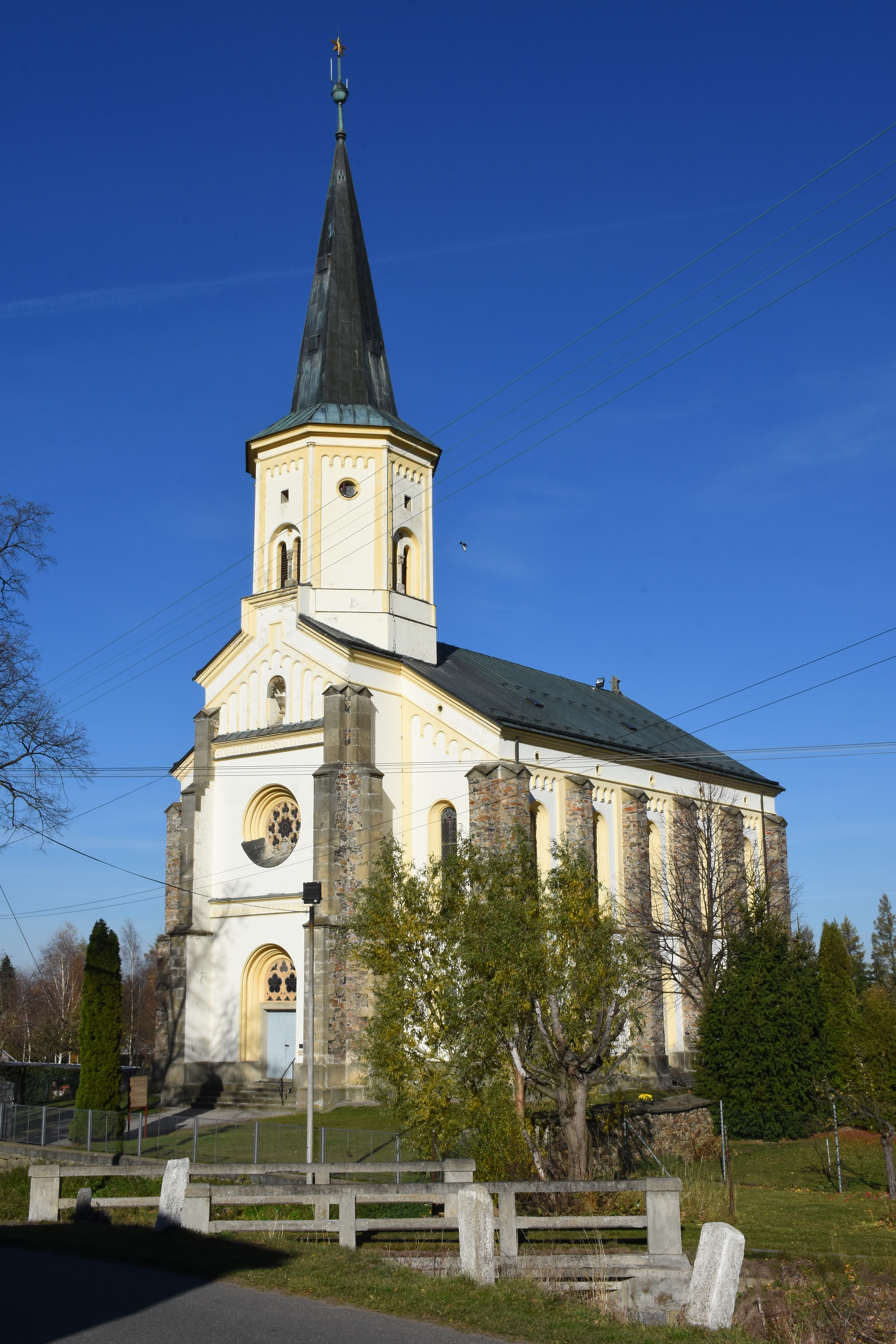
Protestant church

The most important monument of Krouna is the Church of Saint Martin. It was built in the Baroque style in 1770–1773. It has a preserved core and tower from the 15th century.

The Protestant church is a rural Historicist building with Neo-Romanesque elements. It dates from 1896.
