= Phi Beta Mu =

International bandmasters' fraternity

- ΦΒΜ
- Founded: 1939; 87 years ago University of Texas at Arlington
- Type: Honor
- Affiliation: Independent
- Status: Active
- Emphasis: Band directors
- Scope: International
- Motto: "Life - Love - Music"
- Colors: Blue White
- Publication: PMB Newsletter
- Chapters: 37 active
- Headquarters: 3323 Meadow Creek Drive; Missouri City, Texas 77459; United States
- Website: www.phibetamu.org

Phi Beta Mu International Bandmasters' Fraternity (ΦΒΜ) is an international honorary fraternity for band directors. It was founded in 1939 in Texas.

== History ==
The idea for Phi Beta Mu originated with Earl D. Irons, bandmaster and chairman of fine arts at North Texas Agricultural College (now The University of Texas at Arlington),.irons wanted to honor the dedication and devotion of the school band directors who he felt did work was important but lacked national recognition. He envisioned a group similar to the American Bandmasters Association which had recognized Irons with membership.

While serving as a guest conductor at the Texas Tech University summer band camp in the summer of 1937, Irons shared his idea with Dr. Dewey Otto Wiley Wiley who was the director of the band camp. Wiey convened a meeting with other band directors at the camp, including Carl Sanford Eskridge of Wink, Texas; Clyde Rowe, who later taught in Borger, Texas; George Rucker of Bowie, Texas; and Russell Schrader of Sweetwater, Texas. Cochran, Rucker, and Shrader agreed to assist Wiley and Irons in creating the framework for the organization.

The group met several times that summer in the university's Textile Building. They decided to structure the new organization as a national bandmasters fraternity. Dr. Cohbur O'Neal, a former student of Irons who was an English professor at North Texas Agricultural College, assisted Iron with the details of the fraternity's organizational structure. O'Neal and Irons chose the name Phi Beta Mu, with the subtitle National Bandmasters Fraternity. They also drafted a constitution and oath which were approved by the charter members in the summer of 1938. The charter members were:

- Carl Cochron
- R. A. Dhossche
- Walter S. Dickinsen
- Sandford Eskridge
- Joe Haddon
- Earl D Irons
- Robert McCown
- Clyde Rowe
- George Rucker
- Russell Shrader
- Richard Walker
- D. O. Wiley

The Alpha chapter in Texas held its first meeting in February 1939. Dr. Milburn Carey, a 1941 initiate of the Alpha chapter, chartered Beta chapter in Enid, Oklahoma in 1944. Harold L. Walters, an honorary member of Beta chapter, invited Carey to charter Gamma chapter in Indiana in 1946. The three chapters were the basis of establishing a national organization that was organized in 1954, including a six-member national board and officers. Carey was elected as the first national president in 1955, serving in that role for 23 years. The fraternity decided to become an international organization and established an international office in Enid, Oklahoma in 1957. This led to the establishment of new state chapters; chapters were chartered in Graz, Austria and Alberta, Canada in 1975, and Japan in 1978.

In 1976, the National Music Council installed a historical plaque at the University of Texas at Arlington to honor the work of Irons as the founder of the Phi Beta Mu.

For its 75th anniversary in 2013, the fraternity commissioned composer Mark Camphouse to create a musical piece. Camphouse's "Homage to the Dream" premiered on July 21, 2013, at the annual Phi Beta Mu convention, part of the Texas Bandmasters Convention in San Antonio; it was performed by the Greater Dallas Youth Orchestra Wind Symphony.

The society's national headquarters is in Missouri City, Texas.

== Symbols and traditions ==
The Phi Beta Mu name stood for "Life, Love, and Music" which is also the fraternity's motto. Its colors are blue and white.

Originally, the fraternity's badge or member recognition pin consisted of the Greek letters ΦΒΜ on a black enamel bar across the center of four gold spaces of the music staff in a vertical position and closed at each end. In 1954, the fraternity added recognition pins for the international executive committee members and former presidents of chapters.

The fraternity's music includes "Men of Music March", composed by members Harold L. Walters and Karl L. King, and "Hail to the Fraternity" by Irons.

== Membership ==
Membership in Phi Beta Mu is through invitation.

== Activities ==
Phi Beta Mu chapters meet twice a year.

Phi Beta Mu presents several awards annually. The Earl D. Irons Program of Distinction is its highest award and is given to highly advanced bands. The Outstanding Bandmasters Award is given to band directors of militaries, universities, and high schools. The Outstanding Contributor Award is given to outstanding assistant band directors. The fraternity also issues the Outstanding Band Student Award. Phi Beta Mu also inducts members into its Hall of Fame. This highest honor is bestowed on a very limited basis.

== Chapters ==
The fraternity was designed to honor outstanding band directors at the state level, with only one potential chapter per state. Following is a list of Phi Beta Mu chapters, with active chapters indicated in bold and inactive chapters in italics.

Chapter	Charter date and range	Location	Status	Ref.
**Alpha**	1938	Texas	Active	
**Beta**	1952	California	Active	(Note: Chapter was established in 1949.)
**Gamma**	November 27, 1953	Indiana	Active	
**Epsilon**	195x ?	Louisiana	Active	
**Delta**	1957	Mississippi	Active	
**Zeta**	1958	Georgia	Active	
**Eta**		Tennessee	Active	
**Theta**	1975	South Carolina	Active	
**Iota**	1957	Kansas	Active	
**Kappa**	c. 1958	Colorado	Active	
**Lambda**	January 8, 1959	Missouri	Active	
**Mu**	1959	Ohio	Active	
**Nu**	1959	Pennsylvania	Active	
**Xi**	c. 1958	Illinois	Active	
**Omicron**	1960	Arkansas	Active	
**Pi**	1960	Wisconsin	Active	
**Rho**	April 13, 1960	Alabama	Active	(Note: Was chartered as Epsilon chapter but was later changed as that name had already been assigned.)
**Sigma**	1961	South Dakota	Active	
**Tau**	196x ?	West Virginia	Active	
Upsilon	196x ?		Inactive	
**Phi**	1963	New Mexico	Active	
**Chi**	196x ?–197x ?, 2022	New York	Active	
**Psi**	c. 1964	Kentucky	Active	
**Omega**	1963	Florida	Active	
**Kappa Zeta**	196x ?–197x?, 2017	Arizona	Active	
**Kappa Theta**	September 24, 1968	Minnesota	Active	
Kappa Vua (see **Alpha Chi**)	1960s	Virginia	Inactive	
**Mu Alpha**	1975	Alberta, Canada	Active	(Note: Chartered originally as the Western Canada chapter.)
**Sigma Chi**		Wyoming	Active	
	1975	Graz, Austria	Inactive	
	1978	Japan	Inactive	
**Alpha Chi** (see Kappa Vua)	mid 1980s	Virginia	Active	
**Lambda Alpha**		Connecticut	Active	
Lambda Beta		Hawaii	Inactive	
**Lambda Zeta**	19xx ?–xxxx ?; January 2015	Oregon	Active	
**Lambda Iota**	August 1998	Ontario, Canada	Active	
**Lambda Mu**		Montana	Active	
Lambda Nu		North Carolina	Inactive	
**Alpha Gamma**	October 24, 2003	North Dakota	Active	
**Alpha Theta**	20xx ?	Nebraska	Active	
**Alpha Iota**	2007–20xx ?; March 3, 2023	Maryland	Active	
Beta Gamma	20xx ?	British Columbia, Canada	Inactive	
**Beta Zeta**	2016	Brazil	Active	
**Iota Lambda**	November 19, 2020	Nevada	Active	

== Notable members ==
- Karl L. King – march music bandmaster and composer

== See also ==
- Honor society
- Professional fraternities and sororities
