= Bohumil Makovsky =

Bohemian band director (1878–1950)

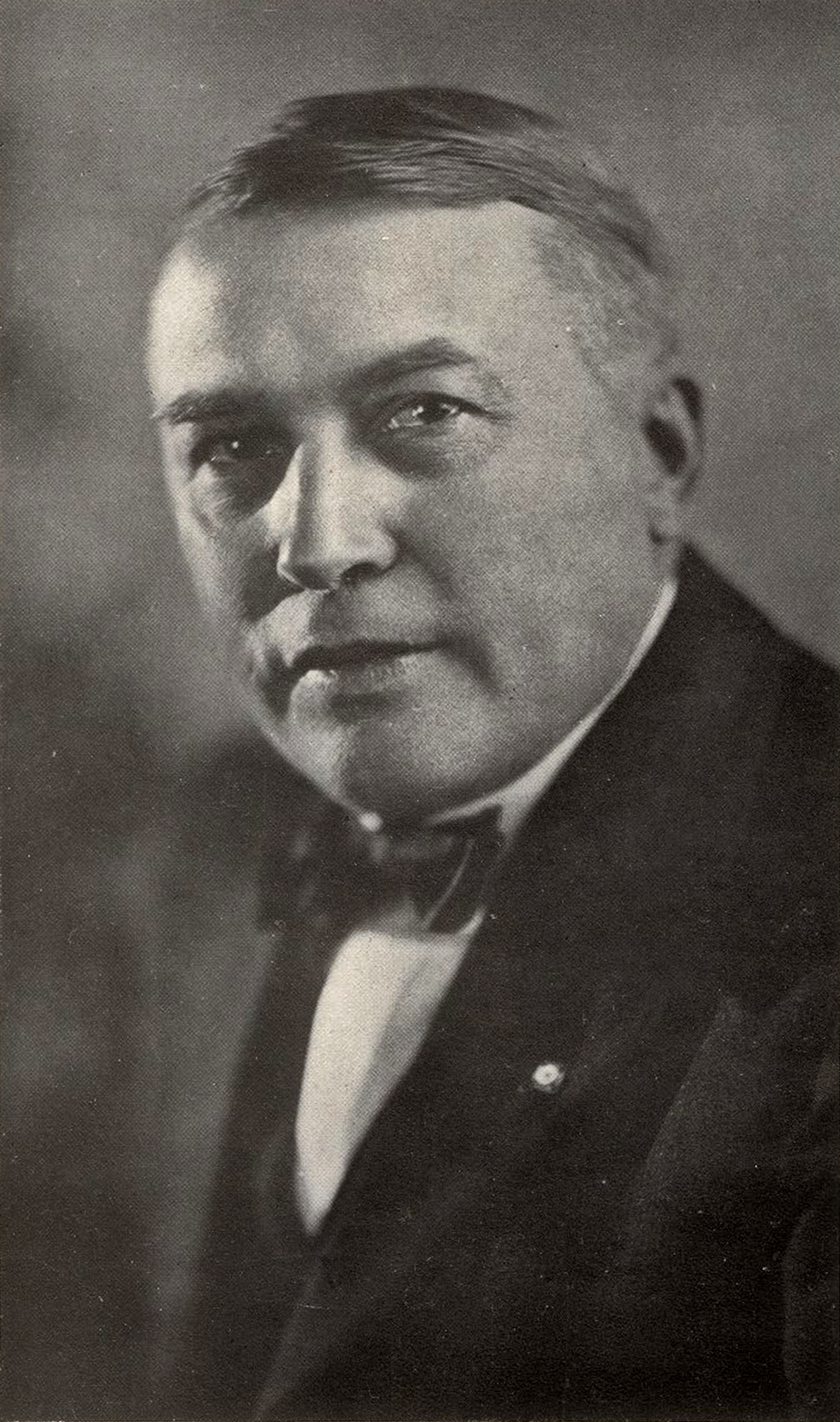
- Makovsky in 1922
- Born: September 23, 1878; Františky, Bohemia
- Died: June 12, 1950 (aged 71); Stillwater, Oklahoma, U.S.
- Burial place: Fairlawn Cemetery, Cushing, Oklahoma, U.S.
- Occupations: Musician, Band Director, Music Educator
- Employer: Oklahoma Agricultural and Mechanical College

Bohumil (Boh) Makovsky (September 23, 1878 – June 12, 1950) was a band director and head of the Department of Music at Oklahoma A&M College (now known as Oklahoma State University) from 1915 to 1945. He was the co-founder of Kappa Kappa Psi, a national fraternity for college band members.

== Early life ==
Makovsky was born on September 23, 1878, in Františky, Bohemia, the current Czech Republic. His parents were Vaclav and Anna Hladik Makovsky. His father was a musician who performed locally. Makovsky was orphaned at an young age—father died before Makovsky was born and his mother died he was twelve years old. Makovsky continued to live on his family estate and was cared for by relatives but had little formal education. His uncle, James Makovsky, who had once taught a royal family in Russia, began teaching Makovsky to play the clarinet and violin when he was seven years old.

Makovsky's older sister, Anna Brdicka, paid his passage to the United States in 1895 when he was seventeen. He moved to Clarkson, Nebraska where his sister and her husband had settled. He was unable to speak English but apprenticed with a cigar maker.

== Career ==
In the early 1900s, he became a clarinet player for a professional travelling wagon show, earning six dollars a week. A few years later, Makovsky formed his band that received a contract to play in Oklahoma City, Oklahoma in 1902. There, he also gave music lessons and played for local theaters. He formed and directed his own concert band and orchestra in the Delmar Gardens amusement park in Oklahoma City.

He had soon started organizing and directing polka bands in nearby settlements such as Woodward, Mustang, Yukon, and Prague. In 1910, Makovsky became the director of the Oklahoma City Metropolitan Band and had a long-standing association with the Oklahoma State Fair. In 1912, he left the Metropolitan Band and established the Makovsky Concert Band. He also taught at the Musical Art Institute in Oklahoma City.

=== Oklahoma A&M ===
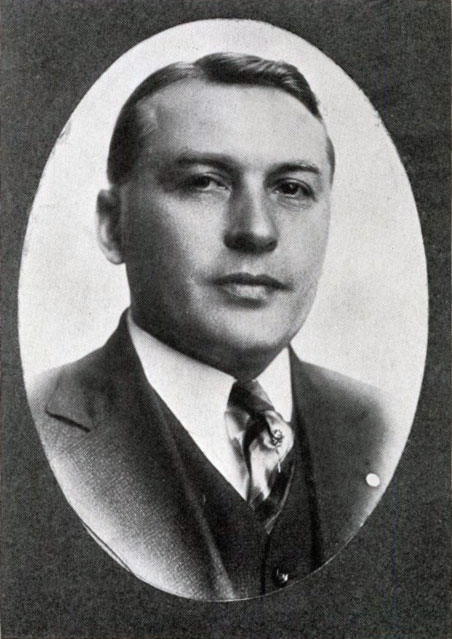
Makovsky in 1919, when Kappa Kappa Psi was established

James W. Cantwell, the president of Oklahoma A&M College in Stillwater, Oklahoma, invited Makovsky to become the university's band director and director of music in 1915. Makovsky accepted the position, although he had nearly declined it in the face of the required administrative work. He started his work here with bands consisting of forty to fifty members, most of whom were inexperienced musicians.

During World War I, membership was low for the concert band. To promote morale, Makovsky and student William A. Scroggs envisioned a national honor society for men in college bands. In 1919, nine other student joined them in forming "Kappa Kappa Psi, Honor Fraternity for College Bandsmen". The honor society was incorporated in Oklahoma and added chapters at other colleges. Makovsky was the grand president of Kappa Kappa Psi from 1927 to 1929.

After World War I, returning veterans improved the quality of the college's band because of their experience with military musical groups. The college band grew to 100 members in 1922. However, the department's quality declined in the late 1930s and early 1940s when Makovsky's health declined. He retired as department head emeritus in July 1943. Before his retirement in 1941, he was a charter member of the University and College Band Conductors Conference (now the College Band Directors National Association).

== Honors ==
Makovsky was elected to the Oklahoma Hall of Fame in 1938. He received an Honorary Doctor of Music degree from the University of Tulsa in 1940. The Kiowa Tribe named him "The Great Father of Oklahoma Music".

He was listed in the 1918 International Who's Who, the 1931 Musical Who's Who in the U.S., and the 1935 Who's Who in Oklahoma. In 1987, he was posthumously inducted as a charter member of Oklahoma Music Educators Association Hall of Fame and into the Oklahoma Bandmasters Association Hall of Fame.

In 1979, Kappa Kappa Psi established the Bohumil Makovsky Memorial Award to recognize outstanding achievement by college band directors.

== Personal life ==
While on a family visit to Nebraska, Makovsky met Georgia Shestack, a fellow Bohemian. The couple married on August 2, 1911 in Omaha, Nebraska. They lived in Oklahoma City, moving to Stillwater, Oklahoma in 1915. His wife died on April 9, 1940.

Makovsky's trademarks were "the pipe he smoked, bent into a miniature saxophone shape, and the uncrushed black bow tie which he always wore...." He became a naturalized citizen of the United States in May 1921. Makovsky joined the Woodward Lodge No. 189 AF&AM in 1908 and eventually became 33rd degree Mason with Frontier Lodge No. 48 AF&AM. He was also the organist for the Guthrie Temple.

Shortly after his retirement in 1943, Makovsky was diagnosed with Parkinson’s disease. He died at the age of 71 on June 12, 1950 in Stillwater. He was buried in the Fairlawn Cemetery in Stillwater, Oklahoma.
