= Kappa Kappa Psi =

US honor fraternity for band members

- ΚΚΨ
- Founded: November 27, 1919 (106 years ago); Oklahoma A&M College (now Oklahoma State University)
- Type: Recognition
- Affiliation: PFA; National Interfraternity Music Council (NIMC)
- Status: Active
- Emphasis: University school bands
- Scope: National (United States)
- Motto: "Strive for the Highest"
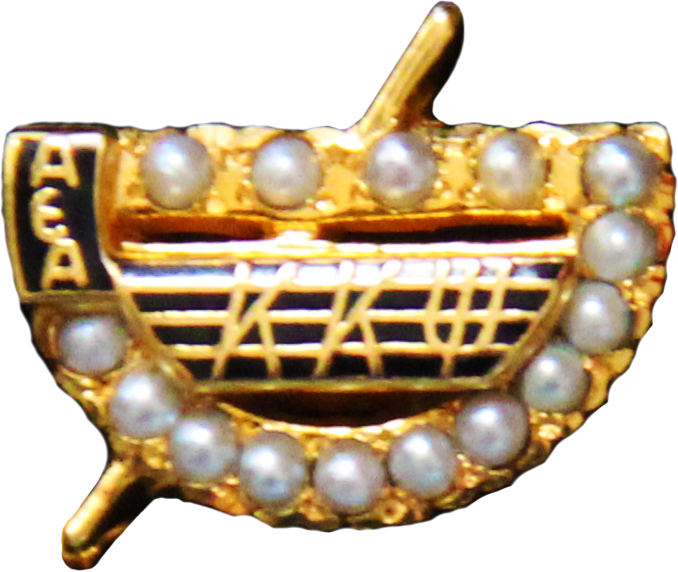
- Member badge

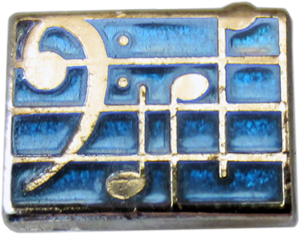
- Pledge pin
- Colors: Blue and White
- Flag
- Flower: Red carnation
- Publication: The PODIUM (1939–present); The Baton (1922–1947)
- Chapters: 211 active; 340 chartered
- Members: 6,000 active 66,000+ lifetime
- Headquarters: 401 E. 9th Avenue; Stillwater, Oklahoma 74074; United States
- Website: kkpsi.org

Kappa Kappa Psi National Honorary Band Fraternity (ΚΚΨ, colloquially referred to as KKPsi) is an honorary fraternity for college and university band members in the United States. It was founded on November 27, 1919, on Thanksgiving Day, at Oklahoma Agricultural and Mechanical College, now known as Oklahoma State University, in Stillwater, Oklahoma.

Kappa Kappa Psi primarily operates as a recognition society providing service, leadership opportunities, and social programming for band members. The organization is led by the National Council and Board of Trustees, which are supported by the National Headquarters staff. Tau Beta Sigma, National Honorary Band Sorority, has been recognized as a sister organization since 1947, and the two organizations share National Headquarters in Stillwater Santa Fe Depot, a converted historical Santa Fe rail depot that was purchased by the fraternity and sorority in 1991.

Since 1919, more than 66,000 men and women have been initiated into Kappa Kappa Psi, with nearly 6,000 collegiate members active today. Members of Kappa Kappa Psi include President Bill Clinton; chancellor and eleventh president of Indiana University, Herman B Wells; composers John Williams and John Philip Sousa; conductor William Revelli; and jazz pianist and bandleader Count Basie.

== History ==
=== Founding and expansion ===
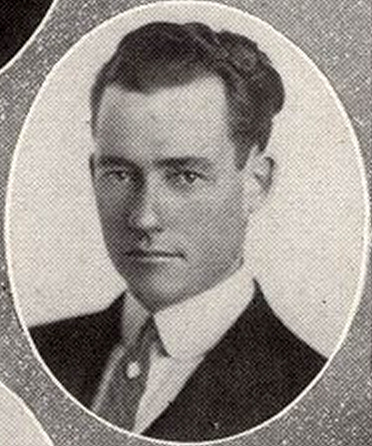
William Scroggs, 1922

William A. Scroggs, a student at Oklahoma A&M College, sought to establish an organization that would "bind [dear] friendship together indefinitely" and unite members across colleges and universities. After some initial planning, he consulted band president A. Frank Martin and Bohumil Makovsky, director of bands at Oklahoma A&M, both of whom agreed to help with the creation of the fraternity. From Makovsky's band, ten members were selected as the first members of Kappa Kappa Psi: William Houston Coppedge, Clyde DeWitt Haston, George Asher Hendrickson, Dick Hurst, Andrew Franklin Martin, Iron Hawthorne Nelson, William Alexander Scroggs, Raymond David Shannon, Clayton Everett Soule, and Carl Anderson Stevens.

The founders accepted chemistry professor Hilton Ira Jones' suggestion to name the fraternity Kappa Kappa Psi. It was organized on November 27, 1919, with Scroggs as president. Martin was it first national president. Legal organization was completed on March 5, 1920, when the fraternity received its charter from the state of Oklahoma. The formal organization of the fraternity was celebrated on either March 23 or 25, 1920, with the initiation of the first membership class and a banquet.

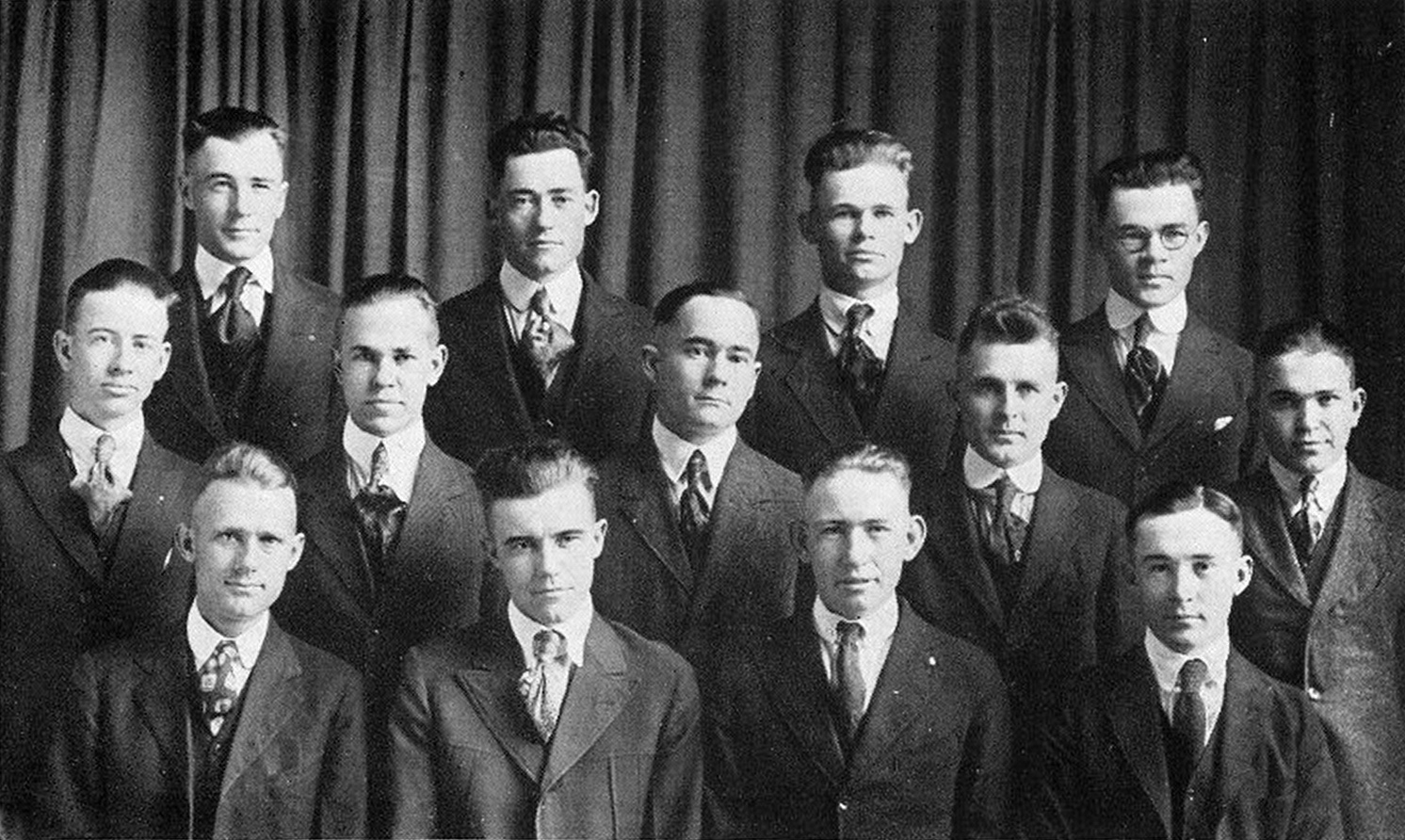
Alpha chapter of Kappa Kappa Psi, 1920

The fraternity grew rapidly in its first years. Within ten years, there were 27 chapters spanning from the University of Washington in the west to Duke University in the east. Only fourteen chapters were installed during the Great Depression, while World War II put a further damper on fraternal activities.

At the 1939 National Convention in Cincinnati, Ohio, plans were set into action to make Kappa Kappa Psi an international fraternity. Invitations were sent to colleges and universities in Canada and South America, but no chapters were ever installed at those institutions.

=== World War II ===
Before World War II, most college bands were military-style and exclusively male. When the war began, most band members left to serve in the armed forces, which greatly strained the fraternity—to the point that 90 percent of chapters were forced to suspend activities. The Grand Council granted those chapters that were forced to suspend their activities "war furlough" so that instead of treating the chapter as inactive, their service would be honored. War furlough enabled a chapter to seal its records and keep its materials in safekeeping for the duration of the war. Petitions for war furlough required the signatures of all active members, the director of bands or other faculty member who was an honorary member of the fraternity, as well as the signature of the college or university president. Only five chapters remained active during the war: the Alpha chapter at Oklahoma A&M College, Alpha Beta at Butler University, Alpha Iota at the University of Colorado at Boulder, Alpha Omicron at Texas Technological College, and Alpha Pi at the University of Tulsa. With so many members serving overseas, including members of the Grand Council, the 1943 and 1945 national conventions were canceled.

It is my firm conviction that eventually Kappa Kappa Psi, National Honorary Band Fraternity, should be open to both college band men and women.

— Max A. Mitchell, Grand Second Vice President,
(Letter to A. Frank Martin, Jan. 12, 1944)

Because of the number of men serving in the military, many band programs opened up to women during this time. At Texas Tech, a local sorority for women in the band was established as Tau Beta Sigma. The women of Tau Beta Sigma petitioned Kappa Kappa Psi to be chartered as an auxiliary chapter of the fraternity, which was supported by founder A. Frank Martin, who was serving as National Executive Secretary, and Max Mitchell, Grand Second Vice President. On January 25, 1944, Martin wrote to fellow founder, William Scroggs, "If we do not meet this new situation and give recognition to the girls who are coming into the bands or make it possible to give aid or assistance to the many universities and colleges that have bands composed of both boys and girls, we will be playing second fiddle within the next five years to some band fraternity that will grant membership to boys and girls and their chapters will open up in the smaller schools where ours have died." The fraternity was unable to decide whether or not to accept Tau Beta Sigma's petition due to the severely reduced number of members and the cancelation of the 1943 and 1945 national conventions.

Ultimately, Tau Beta Sigma decided not to become an auxiliary chapter of Kappa Kappa Psi and chartered as a national organization on March 26, 1946. They were officially recognized and accepted as a sister organization of the fraternity at the first national convention following the war in 1947.

=== Post-war expansion ===
After the war, Kappa Kappa Psi began an ambitious expansion program to reactivate old chapters and install new ones. The fraternity had been divided into 11 districts since 1941, which were led by a Grand Counselor (now called Governors). With the revitalization of the fraternity, these districts were reorganized and pamphlets were printed detailing the fraternity's purposes and history. District governors were charged with giving information to potential chapters. The expansion program was quite successful—in the ten years following the fraternity's reorganization in 1947, Kappa Kappa Psi more than doubled the number of installed chapters, growing from 45 chapters installed before the war to 98 by the end of 1957.

May 1957 saw the first chapters at historically black universities: On May 19, at Langston University, Kappa Kappa Psi chartered its 96th chapter, Delta Alpha, on the campus of Langston University. On May 22, the 97th chapter, Gamma Omega, was established at Texas Southern University.

On September 1, 1967, the 11 districts were consolidated into nine. These districts would again be consolidated in 1987, into six districts with regional names: Northeast, Southeast, Southwest, North Central, Midwest, and Western.

=== Effect of Title IX ===
On June 23, 1972, Title IX was enacted and had tremendous repercussions for the women's rights movement. Title IX prevented organizations from excluding members based on sex. Although social fraternities were exempt from the law, Kappa Kappa Psi, as a recognition society, fell under its purview. Rutgers University's board of trustees decided that Rutgers should serve as a model for the rest of the United States in Title IX implementation and mandated that all organizations on campus become coeducational or face disciplinary actions. The men of the Alpha Phi chapter of Kappa Kappa Psi regarded this issue as minor given the ongoing Vietnam War. With dwindling numbers, Alpha Phi looked to the new women members of the Rutgers band as potential members. The national constitution of Kappa Kappa Psi prohibited women from holding membership, so the Alpha Phi chapter explored the possibility of establishing a chapter of Tau Beta Sigma. This was unrealistic, as the undergraduate college for women prohibited the formation of or membership in any sorority.

On October 8, 1972, the men of Alpha Phi voted to admit women into their chapter. They alerted National Headquarters, and National Secretary Robert H. Rubin replied telling Alpha Phi not to administer any degree of ritual until the issue could be discussed in person. When Rubin arrived at Rutgers on November 11, 1972, he learned that the first degree of ritual had been administered, which began formal probationary membership. Alpha Phi's charter was immediately revoked and their chapter was placed on suspension. On November 13, the former Alpha Phi chapter formally reorganized as Mu Upsilon Alpha (local). On October 7, 2007, Mu Upsilon Alpha became a chapter of Mu Beta Psi.

If women are to become a part of Kappa Kappa Psi, let it be done in an orderly manner with an open discussion at a Grand Chapter meeting and not in open defiance to the National Constitution.

— Richard "Doc" Worthington, Grand President,
(Address to Delegation, 1973 National Convention)

At the national convention of 1973, the issues presented by Title IX were discussed by the Grand Chapter. The jurisdiction committee considered several options that would bring the fraternity into compliance but was not receptive to the general idea. At the insistence of committee chair Richard Adler, from the Nu chapter at the University of Michigan, the jurisdiction committee presented the Grand Chapter with an amendment "without prejudice"—that is, without a recommendation for or against the amendment—that would strike the section of the constitution that reads, "All members of the Fraternity shall be of the male sex." The committee simultaneously recommended that the delegation take no action to change the constitution or consider a merger with Tau Beta Sigma. The amendment was defeated, and a separate amendment was proposed and approved that changed the wording to say, "All active, alumni, inactive, and life members of the Fraternity be of the male sex." This amendment was approved, allowing the fraternity to initiate women as honorary members.

During the 1973–1975 biennium, pressure was put on Kappa Kappa Psi chapters by their host institutions to admit women to comply with Title IX. The issue was again brought up at the 1975 national convention, and a joint committee consisting of an equal number of members from Kappa Kappa Psi and Tau Beta Sigma was formed to explore the legal possibilities of a corporate merger of the two organizations, with the results of their investigation to be read at the 1977 convention. At the 1977 national convention, votes were cast by the Kappa Kappa Psi and Tau Beta Sigma delegations for a merger—Kappa Kappa Psi voted 211 against, 9 for; Tau Beta Sigma voted 104 against, 4 for. With the idea of a merger soundly defeated, the delegation voted to remove all references to gender from the constitution, allowing women to become active members in full and regular standing.

The first women to join the fraternity were sisters of the Sigma chapter of Tau Beta Sigma at Arizona State University, who merged with the Beta Omicron chapter of Kappa Kappa Psi after a unanimous vote of both organizations. These women were Patricia A. Childress, Lydia L. Lennon, Leslie A. Anderson, Mary L. Duffala, Mary M. Ketterer, Kristina M. Zipsnis, Clara M. Bertilson, and Toni Ryon, who were initiated into Beta Omicron on August 26, 1977. On August 27, Lea F. Fuller was initiated. The first woman to participate in the formal probationary membership process and become a member of Kappa Kappa Psi was Darragh Hill Young, who was initiated into the Beta Tau chapter at Wichita State University on September 1, 1977.

=== Early 21st century ===
Beginning with the installation of the Kappa Pi chapter at Claflin University on February 24, 2001, 57 new chapters have been installed in the 21st century.

In 2006, Kappa Kappa Psi celebrated its inaugural National Month of Musicianship in November, the month in which the fraternity was founded. The annual month-long event is intended to promote music and university bands. Local chapters celebrate the National Month of Musicianship in various ways, such as creating lab bands for student conductors, organizing reading bands, and hosting master classes.

Also in 2008, Kappa Kappa Psi joined other Greek organizations in sponsoring hazingprevention.org, a national anti-hazing organization. Dr. Malinda Matney, past National President and former member of the Kappa Kappa Psi Board of Trustees, has served on the hazingprevention.org Board of Directors since 2009.

== Symbols ==
=== Badges and pins ===
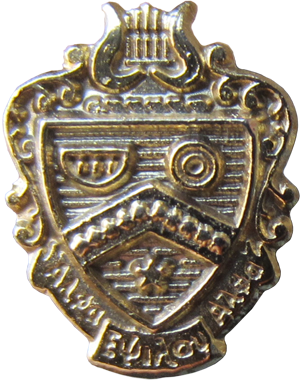
Membership recognition pin

The Crown Pearl Badge is considered the "official means of identifying oneself with the Fraternity." The fraternity badge is in the shape of an ancient Venetian harp, with a musical staff of gold lines on black enamel in the center of the badge, with the Greek letters "Kappa Kappa Psi" in gold across the staff. Five pearls adorn the bar across the top of the badge, and ten gems are set in the harp's semicircle. In the upper left corner, the Greek letters "Alpha Epsilon Alpha" appear in gold on black enamel. A golden baton penetrates the badge diagonally from right to left. Unlike other Greek organizations, however, the purchase of the badge is optional for members of Kappa Kappa Psi. Many brothers instead wear the recognition pin, which is a gold lapel pin in the shape of the fraternity's coat of arms.

Membership Candidates may wear a lapel pin that has a musical staff and a bass clef of silver on a background of blue enamel. The notes A, E, and A are placed on the staff in silver." This is the only piece of regalia that Membership Candidates are allowed to wear—all other jewelry is restricted to initiated members, and even the coat of arms and letters (usually worn in the form of embroidered or ironed-on blocked letters) are restricted unless there is a clear indication that the wearer is a Membership Candidate or colony member.

=== Flag ===
The Fraternity Flag was created by G. R. Schaag, a member of the Eta Sigma chapter at the University of Central Florida. The idea of a national flag was raised with the History and Traditions committee by Schaag at the 1987 national convention, but the committee ultimately decided not to take the idea to the national delegation. Schaag quickly drafted a motion to consider a national flag, which was presented by the chapter's delegate and passed. In 1989, Schaag presented a design for a flag, which won the committee's recommendation over other submissions and was accepted by the national chapter. The upper half of the flag consists of a white field with the Greek letters "Kappa Kappa Psi" inscribed in an arc. On the lower half, three alternating stars of white, blue, and white appear on a blue field, with the top point of the lower white star extending into the white field above it.

=== Hymn ===
The Fraternity Hymn was written by Brother Scott Jeffrey Heckstall Jr. when he was a prospective member of the Eta Gamma chapter in 1977. Heckstall had wanted to be a charter member, but was not chosen. Heckstall was encouraged to rush, and he recalled that as part of his rush process, a couple of brothers took him to a piano and told him, "We know that you play [piano] in church. We need a fraternity hymn. We'll give you three hours, and you sit over there and come up with a hymn. We'll come back in three hours, and we expect a hymn." Heckstall recalled the hymn Someday (Beams of Heaven As I Go) by Charles Albert Tindley and changed a few words—for example, "Beams of Heaven as I go through this wilderness below" became "K K Psi, as we go through this wilderness here below." The brothers of Eta Gamma were satisfied with Heckstall's hymn. Years later, the hymn was presented to the brotherhood assembled at the 1995 National Convention and accepted as the national fraternity hymn.

=== Other symbols ===
The fraternity flower is a red carnation, so chosen because it was founder William Scroggs's favorite flower. Its colors are blue and white.

== Activities ==
=== National Intercollegiate Band ===
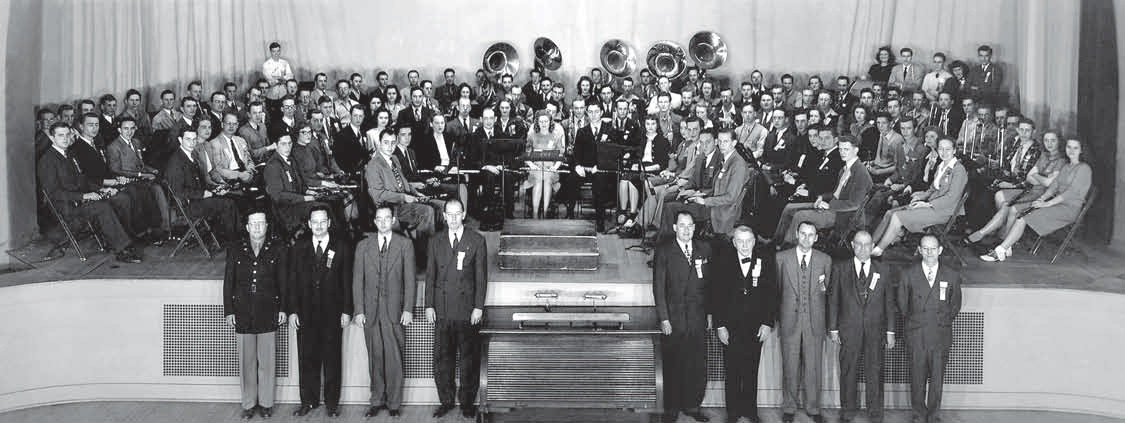
First National Intercollegiate Band, 1947

In 1922, plans were made to hold the first national intercollegiate band contest. A brief dispatch in the 1922 Baton explained, "Sometime within the next two years the Kappa Kappa Psi Fraternity will hold a National Intercollegiate Band Contest. This enterprise will be the first of its kind ever attempted. As Music is becoming the foremost Art in America, our Fraternity aims to assist in so spreading the good work." Nothing came of these early plans, however, and the idea of a national intercollegiate band was not revisited until the 1940s.

Beginning in 1933, the first intercollegiate band was established, with musicians from the University of Colorado (home of the Alpha Iota chapter), the University of Denver (Alpha Lambda), Colorado State College of Agricultural and Mechanical Arts (Kappa), Colorado State College of Education (Alpha Theta), the Colorado School of Mines (Xi), and the University of Utah participating. In 1934, the University of Utah left the intercollegiate band and the University of Wyoming (Alpha Nu) took its place. The concerts held by this intercollegiate band were sponsored by the local chapters of Kappa Kappa Psi and many members of the fraternity were involved with the ensemble, including F. Lee Bowling, who served as the band's manager.

F. Lee Bowling was elected Grand President of the fraternity in 1941 and presented a plan to hold a national intercollegiate band concert, modeled after the Rocky Mountain intercollegiate bands. The plan was endorsed by the delegation to be executed at the next national convention in 1943. However, due to World War II, the 1943 and 1945 national conventions were not held, and so the first National Intercollegiate Band was formed and gave a concert on the evening of Friday, March 7, 1947. Today, participation in the National Intercollegiate Band is open to any college band member who auditions—membership in Kappa Kappa Psi or Tau Beta Sigma is not required.

In June and July 2002, Kappa Kappa Psi and Tau Beta Sigma sponsored the first National Intercollegiate Marching Band, which traveled to the French Riviera, including the cities of Nice, Grasse, Aix-en-Provence, Cannes, Antibes, and the Principality of Monaco. The thirty-five member band performed at Le Suquet in Cannes, in Nice, and in front of the Prince's Palace of Monaco. After the inaugural trip, the program was dissolved by the joint national councils due to its high cost and low attendance, which was believed to be caused by a fear of traveling abroad after the September 11 attacks.

The success of the National Intercollegiate Band led to districts creating their bands. One such group was the Atlantic Coast Intercollegiate Band, formed in 1958 at the convention of Districts X and XI. The Atlantic Coast band comprised around one hundred musicians and was conducted by Paul V. Yoder. The convention was hosted by the Beta Chi chapter at the University of Virginia, and the convention and concert were co-sponsored by the Universities of Rutgers, Maryland, and Pittsburgh. In 2009, the North Central District organized the first North Central District Intercollegiate Band. The North Central District Intercollegiate Band is the only currently functioning district intercollegiate band and has performed at every North Central District convention since its inaugural.

=== Commissions ===
Since 1953, Kappa Kappa Psi and Tau Beta Sigma have commissioned a new work for wind band to be premiered at almost every National Intercollegiate Band concert. This program was begun to add to the wind repertoire under the direction of Grand President Hugh McMillen, and is the longest-running commissioning project in the United States. A number of these commissioned compositions have garnered national acclaim, including Robert Russell Bennett's Symphonic Songs for Band and Karel Husa's Concerto for Trumpet and Wind Orchestra. In the years following the start of the national commissioning program, local chapters have begun to commission new band works themselves, such as Frank Ticheli's An American Elegy, commissioned by the Alpha Iota chapter in memory of the Columbine High School massacre.

=== Stillwater Station ===
The Stillwater Santa Fe Depot is a historic building originally built in March 1900. In 1915, a brick depot was added. The depot was used as a passenger rail station until 1953. The depot was purchased at auction by five Stillwater residents, including three Alpha chapter alumni, in November 1991. Stillwater Station replaced Oklahoma State University's Seretean Center for the Performing Arts as the National Headquarters of the two organizations. The fraternity and sorority share office space, a conference room, and storage space in the converted station, which also hosts the organizations' archives. The brick path leading to the building's entrance has become a "Walk of Fame" with engraved bricks purchased by individuals or chapters.

In 2006, Kappa Kappa Psi purchased a retired Detroit, Toledo and Ironton caboose to provide additional space for the fraternity's history and archives program. After it was purchased, the caboose was placed on newly laid tracks outside the headquarters and wired for electricity, phone, and internet. The caboose is intended to host archives, artifacts, and chapter histories, as well as displays of historical items.

=== AEA Scholarships ===
The AEA Scholarship was established in 1999 to reward those brothers who strive for the highest in everything they do and recognize academic excellence. First awarded in 2000, the scholarship awards up to $1,000 to eligible brothers who represent the best of Kappa Kappa Psi by balancing academics and extracurricular involvement and serving as role models for their fellow brothers. To date, more than 100 brothers have received AEA scholarships from chapters across the country, from all manner of programs of study, and recipients have gone on to become leaders in their professions and in our organization.

AEA Scholarships are awarded twice annually. Brothers can be named as AEA Distinguished Scholars or AEA Honored Scholars, depending on their GPA.

=== National conventions ===
Every two years in odd-numbered years, Kappa Kappa Psi holds a national convention. The first such convention was held in 1922 in Stillwater, and only three conventions since then have not been held: 1931, and the 1943 and 1945 conventions which were canceled due to World War II. The assembly of chapters in these conventions is called the National Chapter, which is the governing body of the fraternity and has the power to elect members of the National Council and Board of Trustees. The location of the National Convention rotates among the districts.

=== Local programs and activities ===
The mission statement and five purposes of Kappa Kappa Psi shape the activities of local chapters. Chapters of Kappa Kappa Psi provide service and support to the bands at its hosting institutions, from major projects like undertaking major renovations of rehearsal spaces used by the institution's bands to relatively minor support such as providing apples and water to athletic bands or cleaning practice rooms. Some chapters also include general community service in their activities, such as sponsoring blood drives and other activities.

The fifth purpose of the fraternity charges chapters and members is to "provide a pleasant and helpful social experience for all engaged in college band work," and chapters fulfill this charge through social programming such as hosting receptions after band concerts, sponsoring dances and socials for band members or their campus community in general, or by hosting concerts and providing food. Some chapters, especially southern chapters, also take part in step shows.

== Membership ==
A member of a college or university band who has completed one term in such a band may be offered membership in the fraternity. First-term freshmen may only join if an exception is made by that chapter's sponsor or director of bands. There were almost 6,000 members active across the country in 2011, and more than 66,000 have joined the organization since 1919.

A member of Kappa Kappa Psi may not be initiated as an active member of Tau Beta Sigma and vice versa — members of Kappa Kappa Psi transferring to a school with a chapter of Tau Beta Sigma and no Kappa Kappa Psi may join the sorority chapter as an "associate member" after going through a short orientation process acclimating the member to the sorority.

Brothers of Kappa Kappa Psi are not restricted from joining Phi Mu Alpha Sinfonia or Sigma Alpha Iota, except by the gender restrictions or other eligibility requirements of either organization. Joint statements between Kappa Kappa Psi and Phi Mu Alpha Sinfonia have affirmed this since at least 1973, and have been reaffirmed as recently as 2005, when the organizations released a joint statement saying, "there are equally important roles for Phi Mu Alpha Sinfonia, Sigma Alpha Iota, Kappa Kappa Psi and Tau Beta Sigma to fulfill on any campus where our chapters mutually exist, now or in the future. Each organization possesses a distinct mission and, as a result, fulfills a unique and vital role in the musical environment of a college campus." Indeed, founder Raymond Shannon went on to join Phi Mu Alpha Sinfonia after starting Kappa Kappa Psi.

== Chapters and districts ==
District map of Kappa Kappa Psi

By January 2023, there were 211 active chapters out of 340 chapters chartered since 1919 and 0 petitioning groups.Colonies are probationary chapters at universities that have not historically had a chapter of Kappa Kappa Psi or whose chapter has gone inactive. Chapters and petitioning groups of Kappa Kappa Psi are organized into seven districts, six of which are named for the geographical region of the United States that they represent. These are the North Central, Northeast, Midwest, Southeast, Southwest, and Western Districts. Although an International District is provided for, it has no chapters.

As a result of changes made to the National Constitution at the 2021 National Constitution, the brotherhood voted to change the terminology for probationary chapters from "colonies" to "petitioning groups."

== Member and chapter misconduct ==
On December 1, 2011, following the death of Florida A&M University drum major Robert Champion, the Delta Iota chapter was placed on investigative hold pending an investigation by the national fraternity. In January 2012, the Tallahassee Democrat reported alleged hazing by the FAMU chapter in spring 2010. According to the allegations, two members of the FAMU band faculty were involved in a hazing incident at a professor's home in which prospective members were struck on the back and neck and forced to recite information. The fraternity's investigation was postponed at the request of FAMU due to the ongoing police investigation. The investigations cleared Delta Iota of any connection to Champion's death; Champion was not a member or prospective member of the fraternity. After the conclusion of both the police and fraternity investigations, the national council closed down the chapter because of its violations of fraternity policy and the uncertainty of the future of the FAMU band program. As part of the chapter's termination, 28 members, including all active and prospective members in spring 2010, were expelled from the fraternity. Alumni members of the chapter who were present at the hazing were also expelled. Furthermore, the Delta Iota chapter may not return to FAMU before May 2017. Members who joined the fraternity after spring 2010 were transferred to alumni status but cannot participate in any fraternity events due to the shutdown of the chapter. No criminal charges were filed due to the delay in reporting and investigation.

== See also ==
- Professional fraternities and sororities
