= List of Michigan State Spartans championships =

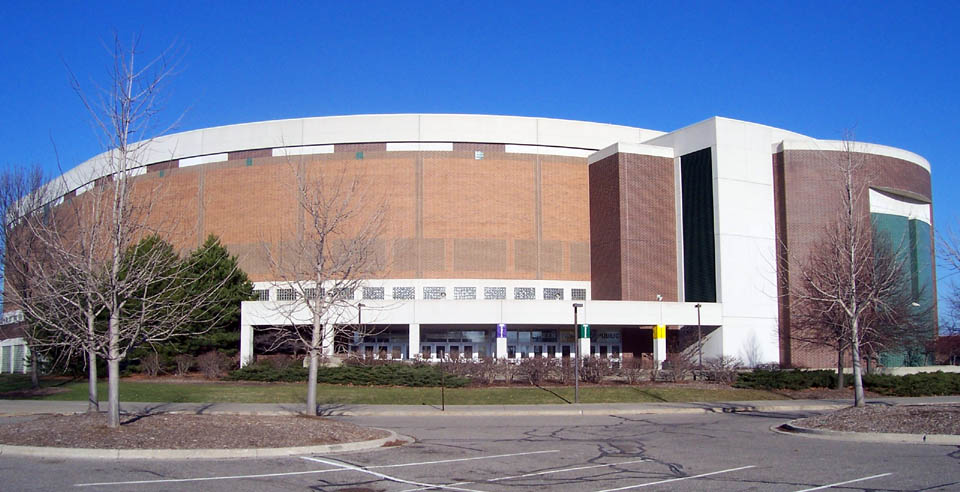
MSU's Breslin Center hosts varsity basketball games and other events.

This is a list of Michigan State Spartans' varsity and club athletic team national championships and runner-up finishes.

Michigan State University has 29 varsity sports teams that compete under the Spartan nickname. The university participates in the NCAA's Division I and in the Big Ten Conference in all varsity sports. Michigan State offers 14 varsity sports for men and 15 for women.

The university's current interim athletic director is Bill Beekman, following the resignation of Mark Hollis.

MSU's Spartan Marching Band or Spartan Brass plays the fight song at every university event. Michigan State University was the first NCAA Division I athletic program to have multiple national championships in both football and basketball.

== Varsity Team National Championships ==
- 1939 - Men's Cross Country - NCAA
- 1948 - Men's Cross Country - NCAA
- 1949 - Men's Cross Country - NCAA
- 1951 - Boxing - NCAA
- 1951 - Football - No. 1 ranking by Billingsley, Helms, Poling
- 1952 - Men's Cross Country - NCAA
- 1952 - Football - No. 1 ranking by AP, Billingsley, Boand, DeVold, Dunkel, Football Research, Helms, Litkenhous, NCF, Sagarin, UPI, Williamson
- 1955 - Boxing - NCAA
- 1955 - Men's Cross Country - NCAA
- 1955 - Football - No. 1 ranking by Boand
- 1956 - Men's Cross Country - NCAA
- 1957 - Football - No. 1 ranking by Billingsley, Dunkel, Sagarin
- 1958 - Men's Cross Country - NCAA D1
- 1958 - Men's Gymnastics - NCAA
- 1959 - Men's Cross Country - NCAA D1
- 1965 - Football - No. 1 ranking by Berryman, DeVold, Dunkel, Football News, FWAA, Helms, Litkenhous, NFF, Poling, Sagarin, UPI
- 1966 - Football - No. 1 ranking by Football Research, Helms, NFF, Poling
- 1966 - Men's Ice Hockey - NCAA
- 1967 - Men's Soccer - NCAA
- 1967 - Wrestling - NCAA D1
- 1968 - Men's Soccer - NCAA
- 1976 - Softball - AIAW
- 1979 - Cheerleading - UCA Co-ed D1A
- 1979 - Men's Basketball - NCAA D1
- 1986 - Men's Ice Hockey - NCAA D1
- 2000 - Men's Basketball - NCAA D1
- 2007 - Men's Ice Hockey - NCAA D1
- 2014 - Women's Cross Country - NCAA D1

== Varsity Team National Runners-up ==
- 1941 - Wrestling - NCAA
- 1942 - Wrestling - NCAA
- 1943 - Boxing - NCAA
- 1948 - Boxing - NCAA
- 1948 - Wrestling - NCAA
- 1949 - Boxing - NCAA
- 1950 - Boxing - NCAA
- 1950 - Men's Cross Country - NCAA
- 1951 - Men's Swimming and Diving - NCAA
- 1952 - Boxing - NCAA
- 1957 - Men's Cross Country - NCAA
- 1959 - Men's Ice Hockey - NCAA
- 1960 - Men's Cross Country - NCAA D1
- 1964 - Men's Soccer - NCAA
- 1965 - Men's Soccer - NCAA
- 1970 - Wrestling - NCAA D1
- 1972 - Men's Indoor Track and Field - NCAA
- 1972 - Wrestling - NCAA D1
- 1987 - Men's Ice Hockey - NCAA D1
- 2005 - Women's Basketball - NCAA D1
- 2009 - Men's Basketball - NCAA D1

== Basketball NCAA Final Four Appearances ==
- 1957 - Men's Basketball - NCAA D1
- 1979 - Men's Basketball - NCAA D1 (Champion)
- 1999 - Men's Basketball - NCAA D1
- 2000 - Men's Basketball - NCAA D1 (Champion)
- 2001 - Men's Basketball - NCAA D1
- 2005 - Men's Basketball - NCAA D1
- 2005 - Women's Basketball - NCAA D1 (Runner-up)
- 2009 - Men's Basketball - NCAA D1 (Runner-up)
- 2010 - Men's Basketball - NCAA D1
- 2015 - Men's Basketball - NCAA D1
- 2019 - Men's Basketball - NCAA D1

== Club Team National Championships ==
- 1989 - Equestrian - Western - IHSA
- 1990 - Equestrian - Western - IHSA (co-champion)
- 1998 - Archery - Mixed Men and Women's Olympic Style - USCA USIAC
- 1998 - Archery - Women's Olympic Style - USCA USIAC
- 1999 - Roller Hockey - NCRHA
- 2000 - Men's Water Polo - CWPA NCCC
- 2000 - Roller Hockey - NCRHA
- 2001 - Women's Water Polo - CWPA NCCC
- 2002 - Women's Water Polo - CWPA NCCC
- 2003 - Women's Ice Hockey - ACHA
- 2005 - Men's Ice Hockey - ACHA D2
- 2006 - Women's Water Polo - CWPA NCCC
- 2006 - Men's Water Polo - CWPA NCCC
- 2007 - MAPP Pompon
- 2007 - MAPP High Kick Pompon
- 2007 - Men's Ice Hockey - ACHA D2
- 2008 - MAPP Pompon
- 2008 - MAPP High Kick Pompon
- 2008 - Men's Water Polo - CWPA NCCC
- 2009 - MAPP High Kick Pompon
- 2009 - MAPP Pompon
- 2009-10 - Equestrian - Intermediate Flat - IHSA
- 2010 - MAPP Pompon
- 2010 - MAPP High Kick Pompon
- 2011 - MAPP High Kick Pompon
- 2011 - Women's Ice Hockey - ACHA
- 2012 - MAPP High Kick Pompon
- 2012 - MAPP Pompon
- 2012 - Men's Club Soccer NIRSA NCCS
- 2012 - Women's Club Soccer NIRSA NCCS
- 2013 - Men's Ice Hockey - ACHA
- 2013 - MAPP High Kick Pompon
- 2015 - Men's Ice Hockey D3 - ACHA
- 2016 - MAPP High Kick Pompon
- 2017 - MAPP High Kick Pompon
- 2018 - MAPP Pompon
- 2018 - Men's Lacrosse - MCLA D1
- 2021 - Men's Water Polo - CWPA NCCC

- 2022 - Roller Hockey - NCRHA D2
- 2023 - NCDA Men’s Dodgeball
- 2024 - NCDA Men’s Dodgeball
- 2025 - Women's Club Soccer - NIRSA NCCS
- 2026 - NCDA Women's Dodgeball
- 2026 - NCDA Men's Dodgeball

== Club Team National Runners-up ==
- 1982 - Men's Bowling - USBC Collegiate
- 1998 - Men's Bowling - USBC Collegiate
- 1999 - Men's Ice Hockey - ACHA D2
- 2000 - Women's Water Polo - CWPA NCCC
- 2002 - Roller Hockey - NCRHA D1
- 2002 - Synchronized Skating - USFA Collegiate Division
- 2003 - Women's Water Polo - CWPA NCCC
- 2003 - Roller Hockey - NCRHA D1 or Premier Division
- 2005 - Men's Water Polo - CWPA NCCC
- 2005 - Women's Ice Hockey - ACHA
- 2006 - Roller Hockey - NCRHA D1
- 2007 - Men's Water Polo - CWPA NCCC
- 2007 - Men's Triathlon - USAT Collegiate Division
- 2007 - Synchronized Skating - USFA Collegiate Division
- 2010 - Women's Ice Hockey - ACHA
- 2011 - MAPP Pompon
- 2013 - NCDA Dodgeball
- 2013 - MAPP Pompon
- 2013 - Roller Hockey NCRHA D1
- 2014 - Roller Hockey NCRHA B (MSU Green)
- 2014 - MAPP Pompon
- 2024 - Roller Hockey NCRHA D2
- 2024 - NCDA Women's Dodgeball
- 2025 - NCDA Women's Dodgeball

== Varsity Team Conference Championships ==
=== Fall Sports ===
Football

- 9 Big Ten Titles

1953	1965	1967	1978
1987	1990	2010	2013
2015

- 2 Michigan Intercollegiate Athletic Association Titles

1903	1905

Men's Cross Country

- 14 Big Ten Titles

1951	1952	1953	1955
1956	1957	1958	1959
1960	1962	1963	1968
1970	1971		

Women's Cross Country

- 6 Big Ten Titles

1981	2001	2010	2011
2013	2014		

Field Hockey

- 4 Big Ten Titles

2001	2003	2004	2009

- 2 Big Ten Tournament Titles

2009	2013

Men's Soccer

- 1 Big Ten Title

2008

- 3 Big Ten Tournament Titles

2004	2008	2012

Volleyball

- 2 Big Ten Titles

1995	1996

=== Winter Sports ===
Men's Basketball

- 16 Big Ten Titles

1957	1959	1967	1978
1979	1990	1998	1999
2000	2001	2009	2010
2012	2018	2019	2020
2025

- 6 Big Ten Tournament Titles

1999	2000	2012	2014
2016	2019		

Women's Basketball

- 3 Big Ten Titles

1997	2005	2011

- 1 Big Ten Tournament Title

2005

Men's Ice Hockey

- 7 Central Collegiate Hockey Association Titles

1985	1986	1989	1990
1998	1999	2001	

- 2 WCHA Tournament Titles

1966	1967

- 5 Big Ten Titles

1959	1967	1971	1973	1976	2024	2025

- 11 CCHA Tournament Titles

1982	1983	1984	1985
1987	1989	1990	1998
2000	2001	2006	

Men's Indoor Track

- 3 Big Ten Titles

1966	1972	1999

Men's Swimming

- 1 Big Ten Title

1957

Women’s Gymnastics

- 2 Big Ten Titles

2022	2023

Wrestling

- 8 Big Ten Titles

1961	1966	1967	1968
1969	1970	1971	1972

=== Spring Sports ===
Baseball

- 4 Big Ten Titles

1954	1971	1979	2010

- 5 Michigan Intercollegiate Athletic Association Titles

1888	1889	1893	1894
1902

Men's Golf

- 4 Big Ten Titles

1969	2005	2007	2008

Women's Golf

- 11 Big Ten Titles

1974	1975	1976	1977
1978	1982	2001	2007
2011	2012	2014	

Men's Outdoor Track

- 3 Big Ten Titles

1965	1966	1972

- 15 Michigan Intercollegiate Athletic Association Titles

1889	1890	1892	1895
1897	1898	1899	1900
1901	1902	1903	1904
1905	1906	1907	

Women's Outdoor Track

- 1 Big Ten Title

1982

Rowing

- 3 Big Ten Titles

2005	2008	2009

Men's Tennis

- 3 Big Ten Titles

1951	1967	2026

- 1 Michigan Intercollegiate Athletic Association Title

1907

Women's Tennis

- 2 Big Ten Titles

1973	1974
