= Joseph Hermann =

American educator

Joseph W. Hermann is an American wind band conductor and educator who was Director of Bands and Professor of Music at Tennessee Technological University in Cookeville, Tennessee. He was also a former President of the American Bandmasters Association.

== Biography ==
Hermann received his undergraduate and master's degrees from Drake University, where he studied under Don Marcoullier. At Drake, Herman experienced frequent theoretical study by returning guest lecturer Vincent Persichetti. As a young clarinetist, he played principal clarinet in Karl King's band in Fort Dodge, Iowa. Hermann also studied and interacted with legendary conductors Sir Georg Solti and John Paynter. Hermann also studied with Václav Nelhýbel, with whom he remained close to until Nelhýbel's death, and John Boyd, who worked with Hermann while transcribing the music of Karel Husa for wind band. In college, Hermann became a Brother of Phi Mu Alpha Sinfonia. After college, Hermann taught secondary school, directing the Dowling High School Band in West Des Moines, Iowa, and supervising the Des Moines Catholic Instrumental Music Program for the Diocese of Des Moines. Under his leadership, the school music program grew to unprecedented enrollment. In addition, he served as the Educational Director for Bands of America and McCormick’s Enterprises, a music corporation in Chicago, Illinois. His college teaching positions include Director of Bands at East Tennessee State University, Associate Director of Bands and the Director of the Pride of Arizona Marching Band at the University of Arizona, an Assistant Director of Bands and a Director of the Marching Hundred at Indiana University, where he became an Honorary member of Kappa Kappa Psi. One of Hermann's students at Indiana was a young Richard Saucedo. He has appeared in over thirty states, Canada, the Netherlands, Japan, and other places around the world.

== Tennessee Tech ==
In 1989, Hermann became the director of bands at Tennessee Tech University in Cookeville, TN. At Tech, he directed and oversaw a comprehensive program that included the University Wind Ensemble and Symphony Band as well as directing the Tennessee American Legion Boy's State Band for thirteen years. At Tech, Hermann increased the band's exposure, conducting the Tech bands for NPR broadcasts, director resource CDs, and taking the bands to various conferences, including the 2008 ABA convention and the 1994 CBDNA convention. Hermann and the Tech Symphony band are responsible for numerous commissioned compositions from award-winning composers including Donald Grantham, Robert Jager, Greg Danner, Thomas Sleeper, and Rodney Waschka II. Composers such as Adam Gorb, Robert W. Smith, Gunther Schuller, James Barnes, Mark Camphouse, John Zdechlik, Jared Spears, Eric Ewazen, James Curnow, Elliot Del Borgo and Leroy Osmon have also visited and had residencies with the Tech band. Hermann was also frequently published in journals and research documents concerning the entire scope of wind studies. Hermann and the TTU bands record frequently and are recording a CD of new music published by C. Alan Publications, which includes music by Greg Danner and Elliot Del Borgo. Hermann oversaw Tennessee Tech's annual Festival of Winds and Percussion that has featured guest conductors including Thomas Lee, Kenneth Bloomquist, Thomas Fraschillo, James Keene, James Croft, Frank Wickes, Stanley Michalski, Alan Bonner, John Bourgeois, and Harry Begian. Hermann and the Symphony Band have also appeared with guest soloists including Joseph Alessi, Joseph Skillen, Tim Northcut, Phillip Barham, Kelly Thomas, Bryce Edwards, and the Boston Brass.

== American bandmaster ==
In 1996, in recognition of outstanding service and achievements to music, Herman was elected into the American Bandmasters Association. As an ABA member, Hermann has served on various committees, overseen commissioning projects, and served on the Board of Directors. In 2007, Hermann was named Vice-President of the ABA, and in 2008 became the President-Elect. He assumed the Presidency during the ABA convention March 4–8 in College Station, Texas, succeeding Robert Jorgenson.

== Honors and awards ==
In addition to the ABA, Hermann is a member of CBDNA, MENC, NBA, the Tennessee Bandmasters Association, has served as the editor for the New Music Reviews for the Tennessee Musician, and is a past board member of the Tennessee Music Educators Association. He is a member of Phi Beta Mu, a past President of the Pac-10 Band Directors Association, a past Province Governor for Phi Mu Alpha Sinfonia, and holds honorary memberships in Kappa Kappa Psi and Tau Beta Sigma. In 2008, Herman received the Kappa Kappa Psi Distinguished Service to Music Medal honoring leaders in wind studies. In 2009, Jeremy S. Martin, composer/arranger for the U.S. Air Force and TTU alumnus, composed a Suite for Band in honor of Mr. Hermann's twenty years as director of the Tech band program.

== Personal life ==
Hermann is married and has two children. He resides in Cookeville. He is good friends with renown Tech tuba professor R. Winston Morris as well as conductors David Waybright of the University of Florida, William J. Moody of the University of South Carolina, and W.J. Julian, former Director of Bands at Tennessee Tech and the University of Tennessee.

== Discography ==
"America's Millennium Tribute to Adolphe Sax Volume XII". Tucson: Arizona University Recordings (AUR 3129), 2007.

- Summer Concerto by Rodney Waschka II

Performed with the Tennessee Tech Wind Ensemble, Phillip Barham, soloist.

"Slide Ride: Works for Solo Trombone and Band" Mark Masters (6055 MCD), 2005

- Performed with the Tennessee Tech Symphony Band, Joshua Hauser, soloist.

"Tennessee Tech Pride" Mark Masters (4371 MCD), 2003

- Performed with the Tennessee Tech Symphony Band, Tim Northcut, soloist.

"Discovery: Emerging and Celebrated Repertoire for Solo Saxophone and Band Volume I". Mark Masters (3918 MCD), 2002.

- Performed with the Tennessee Tech Symphony Band, James Spinazolla, soloist.

"Band Music of Distinction Volume V". Daehn Publications (DP1527)

- Walls of Zion by Greg Danner

Performed with the Tennessee Tech Symphony Band

"Jupiter". Independent through Tennessee Tech. 1995

- Performed with the Tennessee Tech Symphony Band. Frank Wickes, guest conductor.

"The Waters of Myth". Independent through Tennessee Tech. 1994 Recorded at the 1994 CBDNA convention at the Ohio State University.

- Performed with the Tennessee Tech Symphony Band, Ray Cramer, guest conductor, Steven Mead, guest soloist
