= William Everett Derryberry =

American sportsperson and university president (1906–1991)

Biographical details
- Born: October 11, 1906; Mount Pleasant, Tennessee, U.S.
- Died: October 26, 1991 (aged 85); Cookeville, Tennessee, U.S.
- Education: University of Tennessee (BA, 1928); University of Oxford (BA, 1932, MA, 1940)

Playing career
- 1925: Tennessee
- 1927: Tennessee
- Position: Halfback

Coaching career (HC unless noted)
- 1934–1936: Tennessee JC

William Everett Derryberry (October 11, 1906 – October 26, 1991) was an American college football player and coach and university president. He graduated from the University of Tennessee and studied at Oxford University a Rhodes Scholar. He served as president of Tennessee Tech University from 1940 to 1974.

== College football ==
Derryberry was a football player at the University of Tennessee, lettering in 1925 and 1927. He was the first person in that school's history to earn a perfect 4.0 grade point average. He was a member of the Sigma Chi Fraternity (Beta Sigma chapter) at the University of Tennessee and was recognized by the fraternity as a Significant Sig in 1977. He served as the head football coach at the University of Tennessee Junior College at Martin (now known as UT Martin) from 1934 to 1936.

Before and after his coaching career, he earned two degrees from Oxford University in Oxford, England while studying as a Rhodes Scholar.

== Tennessee Tech presidency ==
Derryberry was the president of Tennessee Tech from 1940 to 1974. The university's administration building is named in his honor.
