= Phillip Barham =

American musician

Phillip Wayne Barham (born December 4, 1957) is a classical and jazz saxophonist was the professor of saxophone at Tennessee Technological University in Cookeville, Tennessee until October 2018.

== Biography ==
Barham was born in Dowagiac, Michigan. He received a bachelor of music degree in woodwinds from the University of North Texas in 1982 and a master of music in woodwinds (saxophone) from the University of Michigan (where he studied with Donald Sinta) in 1983. He has previously served on the faculties of the California State University, Northridge, Andrews University, and Lake Michigan College. He has performed throughout the United States and Europe, and has concertized in Japan, as well. His former students include Andrew J. Allen and Dr. Lindsey O'Connor.

Barham's phenomenal playing has literally taken him around the globe. 'An American master saxophonist...' declared a London critic after Phil Barham's debut there in 1990. That recital in the Purcell Room, London, was part of his first European tour of debut recitals that also took him to Oslo, Norway, where he played in the Universitetets Aula, and to Geneva Swiwtzerland, with two recitals, one at the Musee International de la Croix-Rouge and the other in the Palais de l'Athenee. Audiences and critics agreed with the opinion already offered by the New York TÏmes: '...ability to swing at a dancing rhythm or to blister through a swift rippling melody...' published after his New York debut at Carnegie Recital Hall in 1987.

Barham has received critical acclaim across the country. At a recent concert in the Midwest, one critic was moved to write: '...world-class saxophonist... technical virtuosity...a dazzling performance that brought the audience to its feet in a standing ovation.'

On March 2, 1991, Barham completed his 1990–1991 season with a solo recital at Merkin Concert Hall, New York City. Barham presented his Tokyo debut under the auspices of "Music 2000" on October 30, 1993. This concert was held in Sogetsu Hall and featured music by American composers. On September 28, 1994, Barham performed for the Dame Myra Hess Memorial Concert Series held at the Chicago Public Library Cultural Center. Recently, he was awarded a grant from the National Endowment for the Arts to record the works for U.S. contemporary composer Rodney Waschka II. Barham has performed at the University of North Texas, Denton as guest artist.

Barham was also a clinician under the Yamaha Musical Instruments Performing Artist program. Barham is presently a clinician for the Selmer Company and assistant professor of Saxophone at Tennessee Technological University. He has also been the Saxophone Instructor for Western Michigan University's Summer Seminar. In 1989, he received the honor of being among the 'Outstanding Young Men of America.' In constant demand as a clinician and performer, Barham has appeared regularly with the Southwest Michigan Symphony, the South Bend Symphony and the Kalamazoo Symphony. Barham has also appeared on Public Television's WNIT "Open Studio." His recent performances include Alexander Glazunov's Concerto with the Holland Symphony Orchestra, Darius Milhaud's Scaramouche with the Bryan Symphony Orchestra and John Williams' Escapades with the South Bend Symphony Orchestra.

== Discography ==
"America's Millennium Tribute to Adolphe Sax Volume XII". Tucson: Arizona University Recordings (AUR 3129), 2007.

- Summer Concerto by Rodney Waschka II

Performed with the Tennessee Tech Symphony Band, Joseph Hermann, conductor.

"America's Millennium Tribute to Adolphe Sax Volume X". Tucson: Arizona University Recordings (AUR 3124), date?

- Ballade pour Saxophone et Orchestre ou Piano, by Henri Tomasi

Performed with the Southern California Chamber Players, May Chang, conductor.

"The Virtuoso in the Computer Age -- Volume II". Baton Rouge: Centaur Records (CRC 2133), 1992.

- Last Night by Rodney Waschka II

Performed with Yumi Mayama-Livesay, piano
