= The Hounds of Spring =

The Hounds of Spring is a concert overture for concert band, written by the American composer Alfred Reed in 1980.

Reed was inspired by the poem Atalanta in Calydon (1865) by Victorian era English poet Algernon Charles Swinburne, a recreation in modern English verse of an ancient Greek tragedy. According to Reed himself, the poem's magical picture of young love in springtime, forms the basis for his musical setting in traditional three-part overture form. It was Reed's desire to capture the dual elements of the poem - high-spirited youthful jauntiness and the innocence of tender love.

The Hounds of Spring was commissioned by, and dedicated to, the John L. Forster Secondary School Concert Band of Windsor, Ontario, Canada, and its director, Gerald Brown. The world premiere was in Windsor on May 8, 1980, conducted by the composer, and has remained a staple of the wind band literature since.

== Instrumentation ==
The piece is scored for:

Woodwinds
Piccolo
2 Flutes
2 Oboes
Cor anglais
2 Bassoons
Contrabassoon
Clarinet in E♭
3 Clarinets in B♭
Alto clarinet in E♭
Bass clarinet in B♭
Contrabass clarinet in B♭
2 Alto saxophones
Tenor saxophone
Baritone saxophone

Brass
3 Trumpets
2 Cornets
4 Horns in F
2 Tenor trombones
Bass trombone
Baritone
Euphonium
Tuba

Strings
String bass

Percussion
Timpani
Snare Drum
Bass Drum
Crash Cymbals
Bells
Triangle
Vibraphone
Xylophone
