= Russian Christmas Music =

1944 symphonic musical piece by Alfred Reed

Russian Christmas Music is a musical piece for symphonic band, written by Alfred Reed in 1944. It is one of the most frequently performed pieces of concert band literature.

Reed was commissioned to write a piece of "Russian music" for a concert in Denver, Colorado. The concert's aim was to improve Soviet-American relations; as such, it was to include premieres of new Soviet and American works. Prokofiev's March, Op. 99 was supposed to be the Russian work, but it was discovered that the work had already been performed in the United States, and Reed was assigned to write a new piece a mere sixteen days before the concert. The piece was first performed on December 12, 1944, on nationally broadcast NBC radio.

Although Russian Christmas Music consists of only one movement, it can be readily divided into four sections:

1. The opening section, Carol of the Little Russian Children (mm. 1–31; approx. 3 minutes), is based on a 16th-century Russian Christmas carol. It is slow throughout; after a quiet opening by the chimes, contrabass clarinet, and string bass, the clarinets carry the melody. The other voices join in, and the section ends with a series of chords.
2. The Antiphonal Chant (mm. 32–85; about 2 minutes) is faster and louder, with the melody initially carried by the trombones, horns, trumpets, and cornets. The woodwinds join in, and the music becomes more and more frenzied until the section ends with a massive cymbal and tam-tam crash, suddenly dropping into calmness by the trombones, low clarinets and bassoons.
3. The Village Song (mm. 86–165; about 5 minutes) is much gentler by comparison; the cor anglais has two solos, with soli in the flutes, piccolos, and oboes and a solo in the horns at the end of each. The piece enters a time signature of 6/4; the band plays a series of cantabile two-bar phrases back and forth between the woodwinds and brass, with the string bass playing long strings of eighth-notes, which are passed along to the bells. The song becomes quieter again, and the section ends with another English horn solo.
4. The Cathedral Chorus (mm. 166–249; about 5 minutes) starts quietly, as the end of Village Song, but a crescendo in the trombones and percussion brings the rest of the band in majestically. The music builds to a climax, but then backs down for a final chorale in the woodwinds; the sound builds once again, and the piece concludes with a thundering chorale marked by liberal use of the chimes and tam-tam as well as soaring horn counterpoint.

A typical performance of Russian Christmas Music lasts 14–16 minutes. As it was written to convey the sounds of Eastern Orthodox liturgical music, which uses the human voice exclusively, the entire piece must be played with some lyrical and singing quality.

Slavonic Folk Suite is Reed's arrangement of Carol of the Little Russian Children (here called Children's Carol) and Cathedral Chorus for a younger, less experienced band.

The song is also the official corps song of the Crossmen Drum and Bugle Corps.
