= Harry Begian =

American band director, composer and arranger

Harry Begian (1921-2010) was an American band director, composer and arranger. Begian taught at both the secondary and collegiate level during his career.

== Early life ==
Begian was born in Michigan to Armenian immigrants on April 24, 1921. The influence of his Armenian heritage was the motivating factor in his commissioning Alfred Reed to compose his work for band entitled "Armenian Dances" parts 1 and 2 and subsequently "Praise Jerusalem." Begian was a frequent contributor to such band publications as The Instrumentalist.

== Career ==
=== Secondary education ===
At the secondary level, just after studying at Tanglewood (the summer home of the Boston Symphony Orchestra), Begian began his tenure as band director at Detroit's Cass Technical High School, 1947 through 1964. At Cass Tech, Begian honed his skills as a band director before advancing to the university level after completing his doctorate.

He pursued a doctorate and college career at the urging of his mentor at Cass Tech, Larry Teal of the Detroit Symphony Orchestra. Begian also later recounted that Teal had offered to help pay for his degree. Other influences at this time that Begian credited with shaping his approach to music were William D. Revelli, who showed him that "a band could be a refined musical instrument," Leonard Falcone, whose solo playing taught him what musical expression is, and his trumpet teacher, Leonard Smith, principal chair at the Detroit Symphony Orchestra, who taught him the importance of accuracy and dynamic control.

During Begian's tenure at Cass Tech, the program developed a reputation for excellence and was invited to perform at venues such as the prestigious Mid-West Band Clinic in 1954. The Library of Congress created a permanent Harry Begian Collection that now houses 26 recordings of Begian's respected Cass Technical High School bands.

=== Collegiate ===
Following Begian's tenure at Cass Tech, he earned an EdD (Doctor of Education) degree from the University of Michigan in 1964 (Proquest Dissertations & Theses), and started his college teaching career. Begian served three years as Director of Bands at his Wayne State University, 1964–1967. In 1967, Begian was hired to succeed Leonard Falcone as Director of Bands at Michigan State University. Begian directed the Spartan Marching Band alongside assistant director Bill Moffit from 1967 through 1969 and left a large impact on the SMB during his three years in the position. In 1969, Begian left MSU to begin his fourteen-year tenure as only the third person to hold the position Director of Bands at the University of Illinois, a position that he entered in 1970. Begian retired from the University of Illinois in 1984. In 1985, he was lured out of retirement to become the director of the Purdue University Symphonic Band from 1985 to 1987. Then director of bands at Purdue J Richard Dunscomb stated, "We think he's going to bring the same kind of excitement to the concert band that Bill Moffit is bringing to the marching band program" about recruiting the "internationally known conductor." After officially retiring, Begian returned to the world-famous Interlochen Center For The Arts where he had previously served as a faculty member, 1961–1964 and in 1973. Jeffrey S. Kimpton, Interlochen's seventh President, performed in Begian's University of Illinois Large Symphonic Band (the premiere performing band at the time) as a cornetist during the early 70's.

During Begian's tenure at the University of Illinois, he continued the LP recording project established by his predecessor, Mark Hindsley. After his retirement from the University of Illinois, many of the recording of the Symphonic Band under Begian's baton were re-distributed as a set of 20 CDs which are now included in the Begian Collection of the Library of Congress. Begian was especially known for his recordings of the works by Percy Grainger, as well as his interpretation of the tone poems of Richard Strauss.

=== Professional recognition ===
Begian was the recipient of numerous awards, including induction into National Band Association Hall of Fame of Distinguished Band Conductors on February 5, 1994, The Edwin Franko Goldman Award, and the Notre Dame St. Cecelia Award. Begian was a charter member of the American School Band Director's Association, the Goldman award being their highest honor.

He had the unusual honor of being asked to conduct a performance of the Detroit Symphony Orchestra at Orchestra Hall in 1987. Shortly thereafter in 1989, he was awarded the Midwest International Band and Orchestra Clinic's Medal of Honor. (16) In 2003, Begian was honored in a tribute to his professional accomplishments including 50 years as a nationally and internationally known music educator, having conducted over 65 performances now housed in the Library of Congress, and for his many contributions to music education by the U.S. Senate. Senator Carl Levin (D-MI) read the tribute on the Senate floor immediately prior to the presiding officer of the Senate reading a Presidential report on the "emergency" of fissionable nuclear material proliferation in the Russian Federation.

== Personal life ==
Begian died July 26, 2010, at the age of 89. The Sousa Archives and Center for American Music houses the Harry Begian Papers, which consists of correspondence, scrapbooks, research materials and personal arrangements that document Begian's career as a band conductor and teacher.

== Linked external sources ==
- Obituary from news-gazette
- Obituary from Mid West Band Clinic
- Sousa Archives and Center for American Music
- Harry Begian Biography from GIA Publications
- Harry Begian Interview NAMM Oral History Library (2006)
