= IEEE Transactions on Neural Networks and Learning Systems =

- Discipline: Neural networks
- Language: English
- Edited by: Yongduan Song

Publication details
- Former name: IEEE Transactions on Neural Networks
- History: 1990–present
- Publisher: IEEE Computational Intelligence Society
- Frequency: Monthly
- Open access: Hybrid
- Impact factor: 14.255 (2021)

Standard abbreviations
- ISO 4: IEEE Trans. Neural Netw. Learn. Syst.

Indexing
- ISSN: 2162-237X

Links
- Journal homepage; Online access

IEEE Transactions on Neural Networks and Learning Systems is a monthly peer-reviewed scientific journal published by the IEEE Computational Intelligence Society. It covers the theory, design, and applications of neural networks and related learning systems. According to the Journal Citation Reports, the journal had a 2021 impact factor of 14.255.

The journal was established in 1990 by the IEEE Neural Networks Council.

== Editors-in-chief ==
- Yongduan Song (Chongqing University), 2022–present
- Haibo He (University of Rhode Island), 2016–2021
- Derong Liu (University of Illinois), 2010–2015
- Marios M. Polycarpou (University of Cyprus), 2004–2009
- Jacek M. Zurada (University of Louisville), 1998–2003
- Robert J. Marks II (Baylor University), 1992–1997
- Michael W. Roth (Johns Hopkins University), 1991
- Herbert E. Rauch (Lockheed Palo Alto Research Laboratory), 1990
