= Armenian Dances =

Suite for wind band by Alfred Reed

- Part I & II
- for concert band by Alfred Reed
- Catalogue: UPC 654979034162
- Year: Part 1 – 1972; Part 2 – 1978
- Based on: Armenian folk music
- Publisher: C. L. Barnhouse Company
- Duration: Part 1 – 10:30; Part 2 – 20:23
- Movements: 4

Premiere
- Date: January 10, 1973
- Location: Urbana, Illinois
- Conductor: Dr. Harry Begian
- Performers: University of Illinois Symphonic Band

Armenian Dances is a musical piece for concert band, written by Alfred Reed (1921–2005). It is a four-movement suite of which Part I comprises the first movement and Part II comprises the remaining three. The two parts comprise a full-length symphony. Each part consists of a number of Armenian folk songs from the collection of Komitas Vardapet (1869–1935), an Armenian ethnomusicologist.

== Background ==
The Armenian Dances, Parts I and II, constitute a four-movement suite for concert band or wind ensemble based on authentic Armenian folk songs from the collected works of Gomidas Vartabed, the founder of Armenian classical music.

— Alfred Reed, Composer's Notes

Armenian Dances (Part I) was completed in the summer of 1972 and first performed by the University of Illinois Symphonic Band on January 10, 1973, at the College Band Directors National Association Convention in Urbana, Illinois. The piece is dedicated to Dr. Harry Begian of Armenian descent and the director of that ensemble. It consists of five authentic Armenian folksongs drawn from the vast collection of Gomidas Vartabed originally arranged for solo voice with piano accompaniment or unaccompanied chorus.

Armenian Dances (Part II) was commissioned by the Armenian General Benevolent Union Alex Manoogian Cultural Fund after the highly successful premiere of Part I and completed in 1977 as a continuation of Part I and was again dedicated to Dr. Harry Begian. It was premiered on April 4, 1976, in Urbana, Illinois, by the University of Illinois Symphonic Band with Dr. Begian conducting. Part II consists of three movements, each based upon a single Armenian folk song.

== Structure ==
=== Part I ===
Part I is built upon five Armenian folk songs: "Tzirani Tzar" (The Apricot Tree), "Gakavi Yerk" (Partidge's Song), "Hoy, Nazan Eem" (Hoy, my Nazan), "Alagyaz" and "Gna, Gna" (Go, Go). Approximate performance duration is ten minutes thirty seconds 10'30".

1. Tzirani Tzar (The Apricot Tree) (mm. 1–29) (Broadly, and sustained =52), which opens the piece, begins with a short brass fanfare and runs in the woodwinds. This sentimental song consists of three related melodies.
2. Gakavi Yerk (The Partridge's Song) (mm. 30–68) (Con moto =72–80), an original composition by Vardapet in common time, has a simple melody which is first stated in the woodwinds and then repeated by the brass. Its simple, delicate melody was intended for a children's choir and is symbolic of that bird's tiny steps.
3. Hoy, Nazan Eem (Hoy, My Nazan) (mm. 69–185) (Allegretto non troppo =176) is a lively dance, mostly in 5/8 time interspersed with occasional 6/8 and 3/8 measures, which naturally imposes an unusual pattern of additive meter—the notes repeatedly change from 3+2 eighth notes per bar to 2+3 eighth notes per bar. In this song, a young man sings the praises of his beloved, named Nazan.
4. Alagyaz (mm. 186–223) (Broadly, with expression =63), a folk song named for a mountain in Armenia, is a broad and majestic song in 3/4 time; it serves as a contrast to the fast, upbeat songs that come both before and after.
5. Gna, Gna (Go, Go) (mm. 224–422) (Allegro vivo con fuoco =138) is a very fast, delightful, and humorous laughing-song in 2/4 time; it builds in volume and speed until the exciting conclusion of the piece.

=== Part II ===
Part II has three movements: are “Hov Arek”, “Khoomar”, and “Lorva Horovel”. Approximate performance duration is twenty minutes twenty-three seconds 20'23".

1. Hov Arek (The Peasant's Plea) (Slowly, and very sustained) Hov Arek means "come, breeze;" however, on the score Dr. Reed put the translation as "The Peasant's Plea."
2. Khoomar (Wedding Dance) (Allegretto scherzando) Reed subtitled this movement as "Wedding Dance."
3. Lorva Horovel (Songs from Lori) (Broadly). Reed subtitled it "Songs from Lori."

== Instrumentation ==
=== Part I ===
- Piccolo (Alternate 3rd Flute)
- Flute I, II, III
- Oboe I, II
- English Horn
- E♭ Clarinet
- B♭ Clarinet I, II, III
- E♭ Alto Clarinet
- B♭ Bass Clarinet
- B♭ Contrabass Clarinet
- Bassoon I, II
- Contrabassoon (optional)
- E♭ Alto Saxophone I, II
- B♭ Tenor Saxophone
- E♭ Baritone Saxophone
- B♭ Bass Saxophone (optional)
- B♭ Trumpet I, II, III
- B♭ Cornet I, II
- Horn in F I, II, III, IV
- Trombone I, II, III
- Bass Trombone (Trombone IV)
- Baritone
- Tuba
- String Bass
- Timpani
- Percussion I (Snare Drum, Bass Drum)
- Percussion II (Crash Cymbals, Suspended Cymbal, Tambourine)
- Percussion III (Bells, Xylophone, Vibraphone)

=== Part II ===
- Harp
- Piccolo (Alternate 3rd Flute)
- Flute I, II, III
- Oboe I, II
- English Horn
- E♭ Clarinet
- B♭ Clarinet I, II, III
- E♭ Alto Clarinet
- B♭ Bass Clarinet
- B♭ Contrabass Clarinet
- Bassoon I, II
- Contrabassoon (optional)
- E♭ Alto Saxophone I, II
- B♭ Tenor Saxophone
- E♭ Baritone Saxophone
- B♭ Bass Saxophone (optional)
- B♭ Trumpet I, II, III
- B♭ Cornet I, II
- Horn in F I, II, III, IV
- Trombone I, II, III
- Bass Trombone (Trombone IV)
- Baritone
- Tuba
- String Bass
- Timpani
- Percussion (Snare Drum, Bass Drum, Crash Cymbals, Suspended Cymbal, Tambourine, Tom-Tom (high), Triangle, Gong, Bells, Xylophone, Vibraphone)
- A♭ clarinet
