= Victory for MSU =

Official fight song of Michigan State University

- Fight song of the Michigan State University
- Lyrics: Francis Irving Lankey & Arthur L. Sayles, 1915
- Music: Francis Irving Lankey

"Victory for MSU", formerly "MSU Fight Song", is the official fight song of Michigan State University. It was created in early 1915 (and copyrighted in 1919), when MSU was known as Michigan Agricultural College (M.A.C.). An MSU cheerleader, Francis Irving Lankey, along with lyricist Arthur Sayles, created the song. With several changes noted below, the school has used the same song ever since. The MSU Fight Song is played at all university sporting events and is frequently sung by students and alumni.

It has been ranked as the #6 best college fight song by the BleacherReport and called one of the NCAA's best fight songs by ESPN.

== Lyrics ==
Lankey's original lyrics reflected the school's role as an agricultural college, as well as its rivalry with the University of Michigan. The lyrics have since been changed several times. The lyrics had to be modified when the school changed its nickname from the "Aggies" to the Spartans. In addition, whereas the original lyrics were written for an American football game against Michigan, the modern lyrics can be used for any opponent in any sport (although many hockey fans like to change the word "ball" to "hockey").

On the banks of the Red Cedar,
There's a school that's known to all;
Its specialty is winning,
And those Spartans play good ball;
Spartan teams are never beaten,
All through the game they fight;
Fight for the only colors,
Green and White.

Go right through for MSU,
Watch the points keep growing.
Spartan teams are bound to win,
They're fighting with a vim.
Rah! Rah! Rah!
See their team is weakening,
We're going to win this game.
Fight! Fight! Rah! Team, Fight!
Victory for MSU.

Yelling "weak" is popularly substituted in place of the last word in the line "See their team is weakening." During football games, fans switch the lyrics from the current "Go right through for MSU" back to the former line, “Smash right through that line of blue"–a jab at Michigan.

== Versions ==
Two arrangements of the fight song are played.

- Falcone Fight is named for its arranger, longtime Spartan Marching Band Director Leonard Falcone. It includes the opening verse, the chorus (sung by the band with tuba and percussion accompaniment), the breakstrain, and a repeat of the chorus (played by all). This version requires about 1m:40s to play, and is performed in parade marches and in longer breaks during games, such as between football quarters or hockey periods.
- Pregame Fight is a shorter arrangement by former Spartan Marching Band Assistant Director Bill Moffit (1960–1969), about 35 seconds long, that only includes the breakstrain (as introduction) and chorus. It is played during the football pregame show, after touchdowns and during game breaks (such as basketball timeouts) when time constraints prevent the full "Falcone" version. A shorter excerpt of this arrangement is frequently used during games to celebrate good plays; known as "C" for the rehearsal letter in the musical score, it begins at the line "See their team is weakening".
