= Yongduan Song =

Chinese computer scientist

Academic background
- Education: Sichuan University (BS); Chongqing University (MS); Tennessee Technological University (PhD)

Academic work
- Discipline: Computer science
- Sub-discipline: Artificial neural networks Machine learning Nonlinear systems
- Institutions: Chongqing University; North Carolina A&T State University

Yongduan Song is a Chinese computer scientist who is the dean of the Chongqing University School of Automation.

== Education ==
Song earned a Bachelor of Science degree in electrical engineering from Sichuan University, a Master of Science in electrical engineering from Chongqing University, and a PhD in electrical and computer engineering from Tennessee Tech.

== Career ==
From 1993 to 2008, Song was a professor of engineering at North Carolina A&T State University and a Langley Distinguished Professor position at the National Institute of Aerospace from 2005 to 2008. He has received research awards from the National Science Foundation, NASA, United States Army Research Laboratory, and Office of Naval Research. He is the editor-in-chief of IEEE Transactions on Neural Networks and Learning Systems. Song's research focuses on neural networks, machine learning, and nonlinear systems.
