= Greg Danner =

American composer and educator (b.1958)

Greg Danner (born May 16, 1958) is a contemporary American composer, educator, and professional musician. He is both composer-in-residence emeritus and professor emeritus at Tennessee Tech University in Cookeville, Tennessee. He is the 2010 Composer's Guild Grand Prize winner.

== Biography ==
Danner was born May 16, 1958, in St. Louis, Missouri. He studied composition at Southeast Missouri State University, the Eastman School of Music, and Washington University in St. Louis where he received his Ph.D. He studied composition under Charles Smith, Samuel Adler, and Robert Wykes. Danner is known primarily as a composer of music for wind bands but has composed for choirs and various chamber ensembles. He is part of a generation of American composers advocating for the American wind ensemble's place in classical music and writes to expand the repertoire of classical wind music. Danner's awards include the College Band Directors National Association Music for Young Band prize, vocal category; grand prize in the Delius Society composition contest; first prize in the Taghkanic Chorale composers competition; and the Louisiana Music Teachers Association and Kentucky Music Teachers Association Composer Commission Awards. He is a three-time winner in the annual Composers Guild composition contest, and in 2010 he was awarded the contest's Grand Prize. Danner has received annual ASCAP awards for composition since 1989. In addition to his composing, Danner is active as a hornist in several orchestras, brass ensembles, and chamber groups in the middle Tennessee region.

Danner's works are published by C. Alan Publications, Daehn Publications, Grand Mesa Music Publishers, TRN, Cimarron Music, Tuba-Euphonium Press, Bourne Music, and Medici Music Press.

== Partial works ==
- "The Greatest Generation" C. Alan Productions. Commissioned by the American School Band Directors Association
- "Of Thee I Sing" C. Alan Productions. Commissioned by the United States Air Force Band of Mid-America
- "On Great White Wings" C. Alan Productions. Commissioned by the Tennessee Music Educators Association
- "Adagio and Caprice" Bourne Music Publications. Written for the Washington University Wind Ensemble
- "Walls of Zion" Daehn Publications. 1999 CBDNA Young Band Composition Contest winner
- "Concerto for Tuba and Band" Tuba-Euphonium Publications. Written for R. Winston Morris
- "Cuico-Concerto for Three Percussion and Wind Ensemble" C. Alan Productions. Commissioned by the Caixa Trio
- "Song of the Universal" Willis Music Company/Hal Leonard. Taghkanic Chorale Composition Contest winner
- "Catch the Wind" self-published. 2005 Composers Guild Composition winner
- "Sky Scenes" self-published. Commissioned by the University of Louisiana-Lafayette
- "Shazam!" C. Alan Publications. Written for the Brass Arts Quintet
- "Nova Aquile" self-published. Commissioned by Kansas State University
- "Time..." C. Alan Productions. 2000 Delius Composition Contest Vocal Category and Grand Prize winner
- "Slide Ride" C. Alan Productions. 20?? Written for Joshua Hauser and Tennessee Tech Symphony Band

== Partial discography ==
"Auroral Skies" Altissimo! (B001BCRWDE), 2008

- Of Thee I Sing
- Performed by the United States Air Force Band of Mid-America

"Serengeti" Mark Masters (B0012VCMXY), 2007

- Serengeti
- Performed by the Brass Arts Quintet and featured guest artists

"Legacy" Mark Masters, 2007

- Pinnacle
- Performed by the Tennessee Tech Tuba Ensemble 40th Anniversary All-Star Alumni Ensemble, R. Winston Morris, conductor

"Arete" Mark Records (B0013K8JH2), 2007

- The Amazing Adventures of the Escapist
- Performed by the Tennessee Tech University Trombone Choir, Joshua Hauser, director

"Into the Blue" Albany Records (B000EZ8ENQ), 2006

- Performer-French horn

"Slide Ride: Works for Solo Trombone and Band" Mark Masters (6055 MCD), 2005

- Slide Ride
- Performed by the Tennessee Tech Symphony Band, Joshua Hauser, soloist. Joseph Hermann, conductor

"Impressions" Mark Masters (B001391BQY), 2005

- Nebula
- Performed by the Drake University Wind Symphony, Robert Meunier, conductor

"Tennessee Tech Pride" Mark Masters (B00139YZPS), 2003

- Concerto for Tuba and Band
- Performed by the Tennessee Tech Symphony Band, Tim Northcut, soloist. Joseph Hermann, conductor

"Teaching Music Through Performance in Band Vol. 4 Grade 4" GIA CD-603, 2001

- Walls of Zion
- Performed by the University of North Texas Wind Symphony, Eugene Corporon, conductor

"2000 Midwest Clinic: Vandercook College of Music" Mark Records (3593 MCD) √

- Walls of Zion
- Performed by the Vandercook College of Music Symphonic Band, Charles T. Menghini, conductor

"Shazam!" Mark Custom Recordings (B0013C7YOY), 1999

- Shazam!
- Performed by the Brass Arts Quintet

"Band Music of Distinction Volume V". Daehn Publications (DP1527)

- Walls of Zion
- Performed with the Tennessee Tech Symphony Band, Joseph Hermann, conductor

"Unleash the Beast" Mark Records (B0014CKCGK), 1995

- Beast!
- Performed by the Tennessee Tech Tuba Ensemble, R. Winston Morris, conductor
