= Alfred Reed =

American composer, arranger and conductor (1921–2005)

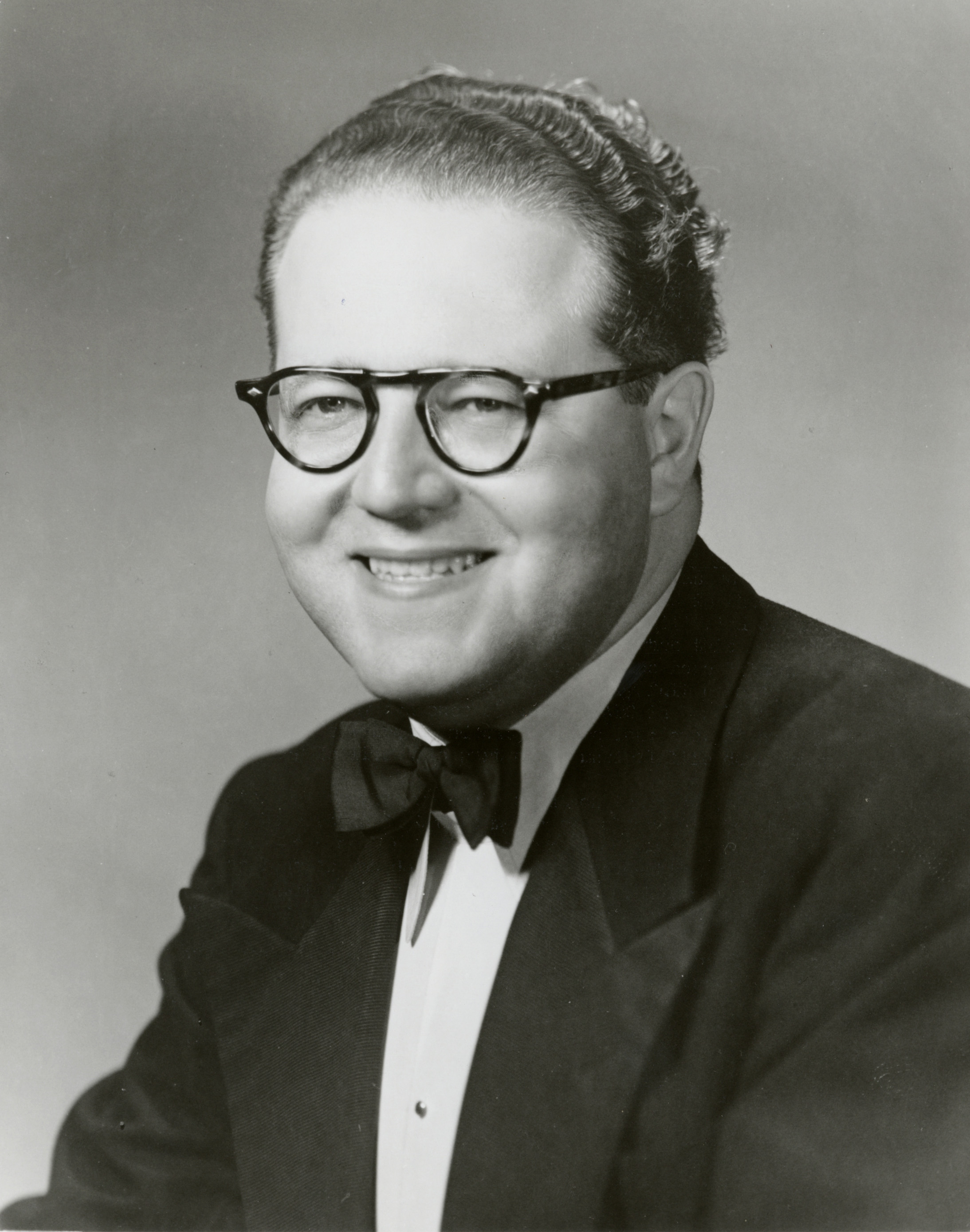
- Born: Alfred Friedman; January 25, 1921; Manhattan, New York City, New York
- Died: September 17, 2005 (aged 84); Miami, Florida
- Education: Juilliard School of Music (attended); Baylor University (B.Mus.) (1955), (M.Mus.) (1956)
- Awards: Distinguished Service to Music Medal

Alfred Reed (born as Alfred Friedman) (January 25, 1921 – September 17, 2005) was an American neoclassical composer, with more than two hundred published works for concert band, orchestra, chorus, and chamber ensemble to his name. He also traveled extensively as a guest conductor (most notably for the Tokyo Kosei Wind Orchestra after the retirement of Frederick Fennell) and served as a professor at the University of Miami School of Music.

== Life ==
Alfred Friedman was born on January 25, 1921, in Manhattan, New York City, to Austrian immigrants Carl Friedemann von Mark and Elizabeth Strasser. Because of anti-German sentiment during World War I, Carl changed the family surname to Friedman shortly before having Alfred. Alfred began his formal music training at the age of ten studying cornet at the New York Schools of Music. In 1938, he started working in the Radio Workshop in New York as a staff arranger and assistant conductor.

In the early 1930s, Reed hired an agent to help market himself around the New York circles. The agent suggested changing his original surname to something less Jewish- and German-sounding to help avoid discrimination. The agent took a syllable from "Friedman", shortening it to "Reed". Reed used this surname for the remainder of his life, legally changing it in 1955.

In 1944 during World War II, he enlisted with the 529th US Army Air Force Corps in Atlantic City, New Jersey as their radio production director and associate conductor producing over 150 weekly broadcasts, and writing scores for over 100 original compositions and arrangements. Following his military service, he attended the Juilliard School of Music, studying under Vittorio Giannini but left without completing in 1948 to instead pursue a career composing music for film and television as a staff composer and arranger first for NBC and then for ABC.

In 1953, he became the conductor of the Baylor Symphony Orchestra at Baylor University, where he received his Bachelor of Music in 1955 and his Master of Music in 1956. His master's thesis, Rhapsody for Viola and Orchestra, was awarded the Luria Prize in 1959.

From 1955 to 1966, he was the executive editor of Hansen Publications, a music publisher. Afterward, he was appointed professor of music at the University of Miami School of Music, where he worked with composer Clifton Williams from 1966 until the latter died in 1976. Reed was the director of the Music Industry Program at the time of his retirement in 1993. During his tenure, he established the Bachelor of Music and Music Merchandising (B.M.M.M) degree and the first college-level music business curriculum in the country.

== Works and arrangements ==
=== Works for concert band ===
- 1944 Russian Christmas Music
  1. Carol of the Little Russian Children
  2. Antiphonal Chant
  3. Village Song
  4. Cathedral Chorus
- 1952 Symphony for Brass and Percussion
- 1955 Lumberjack Overture
- 1956 Ballade for Solo E♭ Alto Saxophone & Band
- 1956 The Crowning Glory
- 1956 Ode for Trumpet for Solo Trumpet & Band
- 1958 Might and Majesty (A Biblical Suite)
- 1959 Music Man (Music from the Meredith Willson Musical) (arr.)
  1. The Wells Fargo Wagon
  2. Till There Was You
  3. Seventy-Six Trombones
- 1962 A Festival Prelude
- 1962 Seascape for Solo Baritone or Trombone & Band
- 1962 A Sacred Suite
- 1963 A Festive Overture
- 1963 A Symphonic Prelude
- 1965 Poetry and Power
- 1966 Rahoon for Solo Clarinet & Band
- 1966 Serenade for Solo Clarinet & Band
- 1966 Choral Prelude In E Minor
- 1967 The Music-Makers
- 1967 Passacaglia
- 1968 Intrada Drammatica
- 1968 Wapawekka - White Sands
- 1970 A Jubilant Overture
- 1970 The Pledge of Allegiance
- 1971 A Ceremonial Fanfare
- 1972 A Northern Legend
- 1972 Armenian Dances, Part I
  1. Tzirani Tzar - The Apricot Tree
  2. Gakavi Yerk - The Partridge's Song
  3. Hoy, Nazan Eem - Hoy, My Nazan
  4. Alagyaz
  5. Gna, Gna - Go, Go!
- 1972 Imperatrix
- 1972 In Memoriam, an Elegy for the Fallen
- 1973 Punchinello, Overture
- 1973 Alleluia! Laudamus Te
- 1973 Music for Hamlet
- 1976 Sine Nomine (Ceremonial March in English Style)
- 1976 First Suite for Band
  1. March
  2. Melody
  3. Rag
  4. Gallop
- 1977 Armenian Dances, Part II
  1. Hov Arek
  2. Khoomar
  3. Lorva Horovel
- 1977 Othello (A Symphonic Portrait for Symphonic Band in Five Scenes (after William Shakespeare))
  1. Prelude (Venice) - The tyrant custom hath made the flinty and steel couch of war my thrice-driven bed.
  2. Aubade (Cyprus) - Good Morning, General
  3. Othello and Desdemona - She loved me for the dangers I had passed, and I loved her that she did pity them.
  4. Entrance of the Court - Behold, the Lion of Venice!
  5. The Death of Desdemona; Epilogue - I kissed thee ere I killed thee: no way but this....
- 1977 Siciliana Notturno for Solo Alto Saxophone & Band
- 1978 Prelude and Capriccio
- 1978 Second Suite for Band ("Latino Mexicana")
  1. Son Montuno
  2. Tango ("Sargasso Serenade")
  3. Guaracha
  4. Paso Double ("A la Corrida!")
- 1979 Second Symphony for Band
  1. Lento (ma ritmico)
  2. Allegro con fuoco
  3. Molto moderato e sostenuto
- 1980 A Christmas Intrada
- 1980 The Enchanted Island
- 1981 The Hounds of Spring
- 1981 Rushmore
- 1981 Jesu, Joy of Man's Desiring (arr.)
- 1982 Queenston Overture
- 1982 The Garden of Proserpine Symphonic Pastorale
- 1982 Viva Musica
- 1982 Third Suite for Band ("Scenes De Ballet")
  1. Fanfare and Intrada
  2. Pas de deux
  3. Polka excentrique
  4. Danse generale
- 1983 Three Revelations from the Lotus Sutra
  1. To Awaken in the Light of the Universe
  2. To Contemplate the Depths of the Soul
  3. To Rejoice in the Beauty of Peace
- 1983 Two Bagatelles
- 1984 Pro Texana
- 1984 Sleepers, Awake! (arr.)
- 1984 A Little Concert Suite
  1. Intrada
  2. Siciliana
  3. Scherzo
  4. Gigue
- 1985 El Camino Real
- 1985 Ramparts of Courage
- 1986 Second Century
- 1986 Danza Caribe
- 1987 A Christmas Celebration
- 1987 Golden Jubilee
- 1988 Praise Jerusalem!
- 1988 Third Symphony for Band
  1. Pesante e molto sostenuto Allegro agitado
  2. Variations on the "Porazzi" Theme of Wagner
  3. Allegro deciso
- 1990 Mr. Music
- 1991 A Springtime Celebration
- 1991 Curtain Up! (A Theater Overture for Winds)
- 1992 With Trumpets and Drums
- 1992 Fourth Symphony for Band
  1. Elegy
  2. Intermezzo
  3. Tarantella
- 1992 Hymn Variants
- 1993 Fourth Suite for Band (City of Music)
  1. Intrada
  2. Arie
  3. Marsch
- 1993 Concertino for Marimba and Winds
- 1993 Greensleeves (arr.)
- 1993 Evolutions
- 1994 Fifth Symphony for Band ("Sakura")
  1. Moderately and sustained
  2. Sakura (Cherry Blossoms)
  3. Allegro molto, con fuoco
  4. Hoe Down (America)
  5. Sarabande (France)
  6. Yamabushi Kagura (Japan)
  7. Hora (Israel and Rumania)
- 1995 Fifth Suite for Band ("International Dances")
  1. Hoe Down (America)
  2. Sarabande (France)
  3. Yamabushi Kagura (Japan)
  4. Hora (Israel and Rumania)
- 1995 The King of Love My Shepherd Is
- 1995 Concerto for Trumpet and Winds
  1. Sonata
  2. Slow Blues
  3. Jazz Waltz
  4. Song
  5. Samba
- 1997 Canto E Camdombe
- 1997 The Big East March
- 1997 The Golden Year
- 1997 Sixth Suite for Band
  1. March Miniature
  2. Summer Stroll
  3. Halloween Hobgoblin
  4. Awa Odori (Japanese Dance)
- 1998 Prism
- 1999 Millennium III
- 1999 Silver Shadow
- 2000 Children's Suite for Solo Alto Saxophone & Band
  1. Kiyoko's Lullaby
  2. Kiyoko's Playtime
- 2001 Acclamation! (A Global Greeting for Winds)
- Jidai - Year Of Years!
- 2000 Giligia (A Song of Remembrance)
- 2000 Music in the Air!
- 2002 Exhortation and Praise
- 2003 East And West (The Kohoku New Town March)
- 2003 Twelfth Night (A Musical Masque after William Shakespeare)
  1. Prelude: Illyria
  2. Viola and Orsino
  3. The Merry Conspirators
  4. Malvolio's Lament in "Prison"
  5. A Double Wedding and All's Well!
- 2003 Seventh Suite for Band ("A Century of Flight")
  1. Prologue: Look to the Skies!
  2. Intermezzo: The Winds and Waves of Wajima
  3. March: To Fly With the Wings of Eagles
- 2004 Ebo Signation
- 2005 Victory!
- 2005 Rosalind in the Forest of Arden

=== Works for orchestra ===
- 1988 American Sketches
  1. No. 1 ("Strings 'n Things")
  2. No. 2 ("Fashion Show")
  3. No. 3 ("Country Night")
  4. No. 4 ("By the Lagoon")
  5. No. 5 ("The Mechanical Doll")

=== Works for choir and orchestra ===
- 1970 The Pledge of Allegiance for mixed choir and orchestra
- 1979 All Hall to the Days! for harp, piano or guitar, strings, and mixed choir

=== Chamber music ===
- 1954 Organ Meditations for solo organ
- 1955 Havana Moon for clarinet choir (3 B♭, alto, bass, contrabass), percussion, string bass
- 1966 Scherzo Fantastique for B♭ or E♭ contrabass clarinet and piano
- 1966 Pastorale for clarinet and piano
- 1966 Five Dances for Five Clarinets for solo clarinet and accompaniment
- 1970 Suite Concertante for eight celli, bass, and harp
- 1975 Double Wind Quintet
- 1977 Siciliana Notturno for solo alto saxophone and piano
- 1977 Trilogue for solo string bass, vibraphone, percussion
- 1983 Two Bagatelles for trombone quartet
