= Bill Moffit =

William C. Moffit (born May 12, 1925, in New Philadelphia, Ohio; died March 5, 2008, in Jacksonville, Florida) was an American musician, music arranger and marching band director, best known for his innovations in marching band show techniques and for hundreds of arrangements for marching bands.

Moffit was the third director of the Purdue University "All-American" Marching Band, serving from 1981 until his retirement in 1988. After his retirement, Moffit was named Professor Emeritus of Band. Moffit also served as director of the University of Houston Spirit of Houston marching band from 1969 to 1981. Moffit served as assistant director of bands at Michigan State University from 1960 to 1969, where he worked under renowned directors Leonard Falcone and Harry Begian. Moffit left an indelible impact at MSU with his musical arrangements and Patterns in Motion. Before going to MSU, he spent 10 years in the public school systems in Ohio and Michigan as a band director, including at Tippecanoe High School in Tipp City, Ohio, and Mt. Morris High School in Mt. Morris, MI.

Moffit was an innovator in both marching band style and music. His "Patterns in Motion", based on a constant-motion system using four-player squads, revolutionized bands and their halftime shows, moving away from the military style of marching. His style dominated both college and high school marching band shows and competitions from the late 1960s to the early 1990s, when drum corps began to become popular.

A prolific arranger, Moffit arranged more than 450 popular songs for marching bands as part of his famous Soundpower Series published by Hal Leonard, a staple of collegiate and pep bands for decades and still in widespread use today. Moffit was known to hear a new song on radio and have it arranged for his band the following week – sometimes so fast that proper copyright clearances could not be obtained.
