= Tennessee Technological University =

Public university in Cookeville, Tennessee, US

- Other name: TTU
- Former names: University of Dixie (1909–1915); Tennessee Polytechnic Institute (1915–1965)
- Type: Public research university and institute of technology
- Established: March 27, 1915; 111 years ago
- Accreditation: SACS
- Academic affiliations: ORAU; Space-grant
- Endowment: $120.45 million (2025)
- President: Philip B. Oldham
- Academic staff: c. 550
- Students: 10,701 (fall 2025)
- Location: Cookeville, Tennessee, U.S. 36°10′35″N 85°30′35″W
- Campus: Suburban, 235 acres (95 ha)
- Colors: Purple and gold
- Nickname: Golden Eagles
- Sporting affiliations: NCAA Division I Ohio Valley Conference
- Mascot: Awesome Eagle
- Website: tntech.edu

Tennessee Technological University (branded as Tennessee Tech) is a public research university in Cookeville, Tennessee, United States. It was formerly known as Tennessee Polytechnic Institute (TPI), and before that as University of Dixie, the name under which it was founded as a private institution. Affiliated with the Tennessee Board of Regents, the university is governed by a board of trustees. It is classified among "R2: Doctoral Universities – High research activity".

As an institute of technology, Tennessee Tech places special emphasis on undergraduate education in fields related to engineering, technology, and computer science, although degrees in education, liberal arts, agriculture, nursing, and other fields of study can be pursued as well. Additionally, there are graduate and doctorate offerings in engineering, education, business, and the liberal arts. As of the 2018 fall semester, Tennessee Tech enrolled more than 10,000 students, and its campus had 87 buildings on 235 acres (95 ha) centered along Dixie Avenue in northern Cookeville.

Tennessee Tech athletic teams, named the Golden Eagles, compete in the National Collegiate Athletic Association (NCAA) Division I as a member of the Ohio Valley Conference.

== History ==
Tennessee Tech is rooted in the University of Dixie (colloquially known as Dixie College), which was chartered in November 1909 and began operations in 1912. Dixie College was established as a Christian institution by members of the Broad Street Church of Christ, headed by Jere Whitson. Whitson served as the college's only president. It struggled with funding and enrollment, however, and the campus was deeded to local governments.

On March 27, 1915, the state government assumed control of the campus and chartered the new school as Tennessee Polytechnic Institute. The new school included just 13 faculty members and 19 students during the 1916–17 academic year and consisted of just 18 acres of undeveloped land with one administrative building and two student dorms. Due to the rural nature of the school, students also worked in the school garden to grow and prepare their own meals. In 1929, the first class graduated with four-year bachelor's degrees.

Everett Derryberry was elected to serve as Tennessee Tech's president in 1940. During his tenure, the university experienced its largest period of growth with the addition of new buildings and academic programs. He was the longest serving president in university history, leaving office in 1974. During his tenure, the university's student enrollment had increased from 700 to 7,000. Tennessee Polytechnic Institute was elevated to university status in 1965, when its name changed to Tennessee Technological University.

== Academics ==
Tennessee Tech has bachelor's degree programs and graduate programs as well as doctoral programs in the fields of education, engineering, and environmental sciences. TTU emphasizes a focus in STEM degrees but also provides infrastructure for traditional programs including liberal arts and nursing.

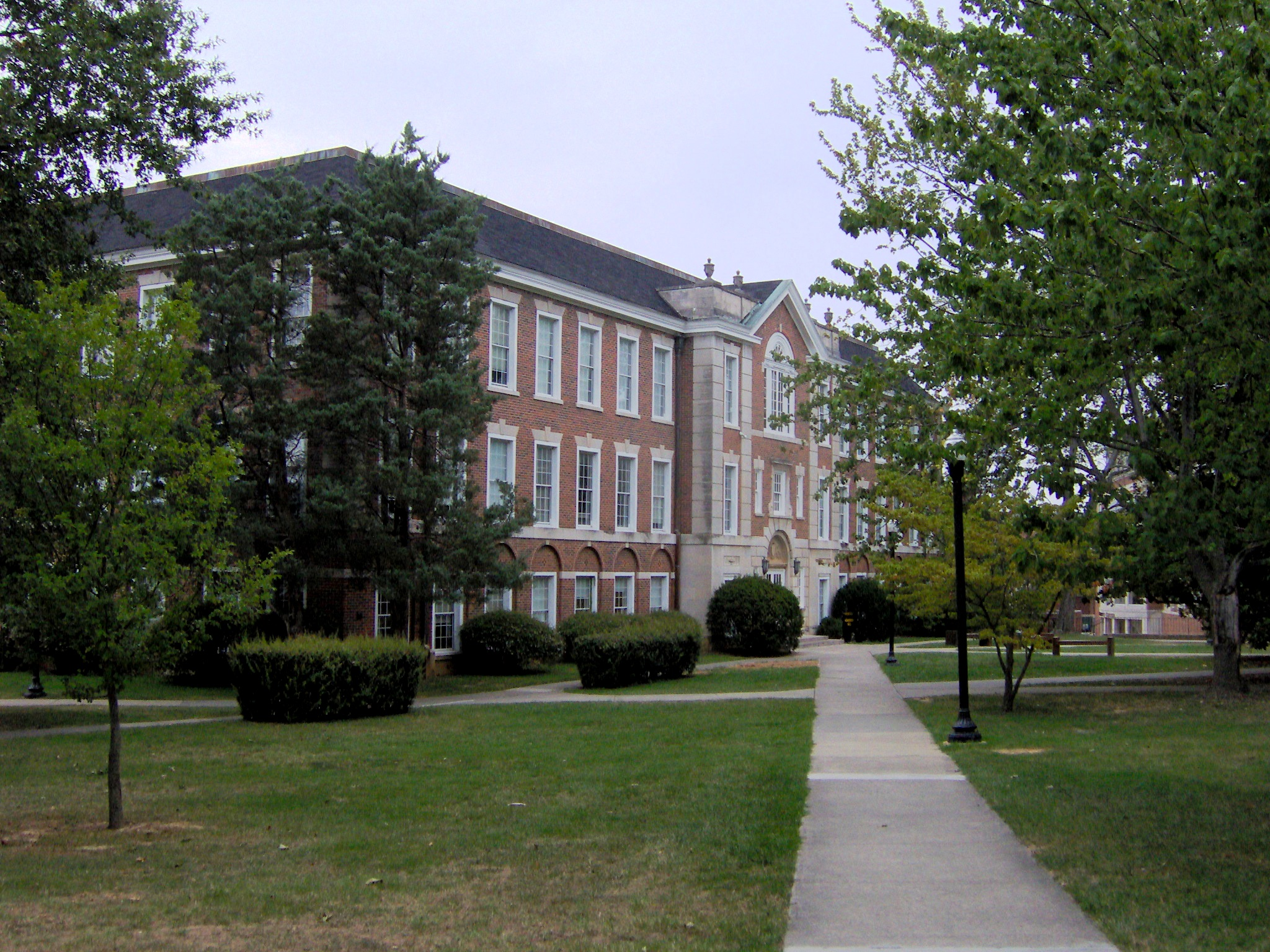
Henderson Hall, constructed in 1931 and placed on the National Register of Historic Places in 1985

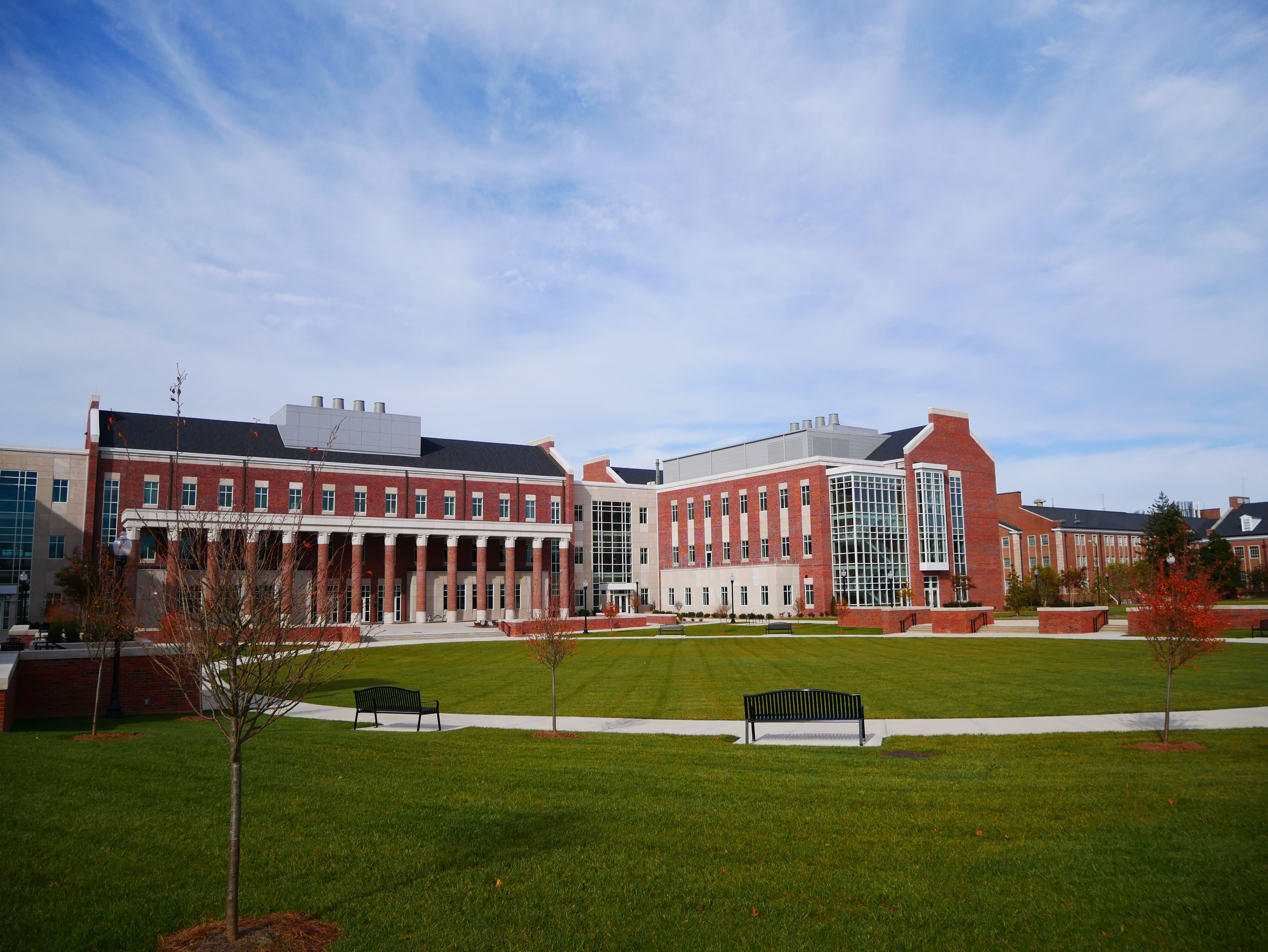
Laboratory Science Commons.

- College of Agriculture and Human Ecology
- College of Arts and Sciences
- College of Business
- College of Education
- College of Engineering
- College of Fine Arts
- College of Graduate Studies
- College of Interdisciplinary Studies
- School of Art, Craft, & Design
- Whitson-Hester College of Nursing

=== Research centers ===
- The Center for Energy Systems Research (CESR) is an interdisciplinary facility dedicated to research in various problems pertaining to energy and infrastructure. The facility pursues research in "solar energy, energy storage, smart grid power systems, power electronics, wind energy, distributed power plant performance improvement, cement, concrete, bridge and structure health monitoring, flood flow modeling, advanced communications, and cyber security."
- The Center for Manufacturing Research (CMR) is a facility appropriated by the College of Engineering for the research in areas related to manufacturing. It has been designated as a Center of Excellence by the state of Tennessee.
- The Center for the Management, Utilization & Protection of Water Resources is an interdisciplinary research center that focuses its research on biodiversity, enabling technologies and tools, water security and sustainability, and the water-energy-food nexus. It has been designated as a Center of Excellence by the state of Tennessee.
- The Millard Oakley STEM Center for Teaching & Learning in Science, Technology, Engineering, & Mathematics (STEM) promotes and supports quality STEM outreach programs in the Upper Cumberland region and throughout the state of Tennessee. The staff at the center work with Tech faculty across several disciplines to offer standards-aligned STEM outreach programs, promote STEM-related activities, and disseminate STEM education resources.
- The Cybersecurity Education, Research, and Outreach Center (CEROC) aims to integrate university-wide existing activities and initiatives in cybersecurity education, research, and outreach. It has been designated as a National Center of Academic Excellence in Cyber Defense Education through 2021.
- The Tennessee Cooperative Fishery Research Unit (TNCFRU) works closely with the Center for the Management, Utilization, and Protection of Water Resources to "enhance graduate education in fisheries and wildlife sciences and to facilitate research between natural resource agencies and universities on topics of mutual concern".

=== Rankings ===
Academic rankings

National
- U.S. News & World Report: 288 (tie)

== Student life ==
Undergraduate demographics as of Fall 2023
Race and ethnicity	Total
White	80%
Black	5%
Hispanic	5%
Two or more races	3%
Unknown	3%
Asian	2%
International student	2%
Economic diversity
Low-income (Note: The percentage of students who received an income-based federal Pell grant intended for low-income students.)	32%
Affluent (Note: The percentage of students who are a part of the American middle class at the bare minimum.)	68%

Tennessee Tech hosts over 200 student organizations including several fraternities and sororities. Student Samuel Dowlen suffered severe injuries and temporary paralysis in August of 2009, during fraternity pranks in Phi Gamma Delta's inflatable pool. Spinal fusion surgery and months of physical rehabilitation followed. A court awarded Dowlen $7.2 million in the court decision against the fraternity.

== Athletics ==
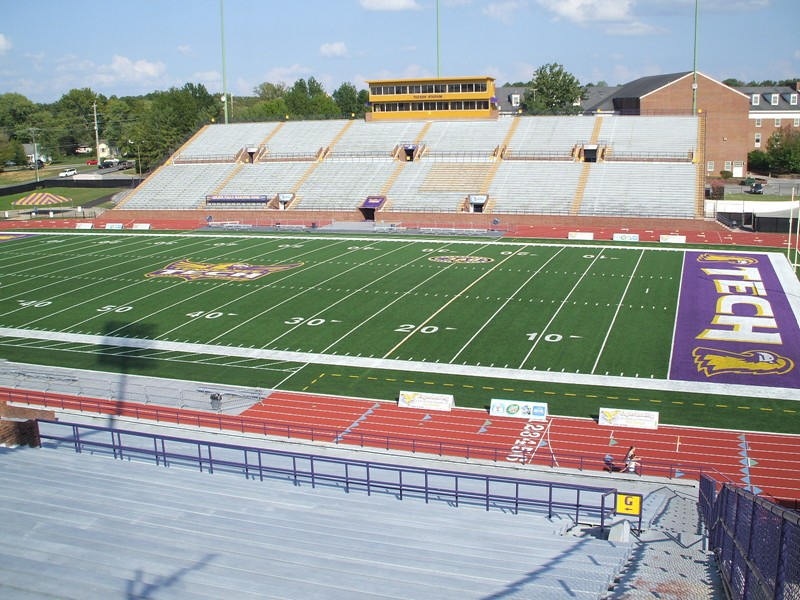
Tucker Stadium and Overall Field

The Tennessee Tech athletic program is a member of the Southern Conference (SoCon) and competes in the NCAA Division I Football Championship Subdivision. The school's teams are known as the Golden Eagles, the team colors are purple and gold, and the mascot is Awesome Eagle.

== Theater ==
The Backdoor Playhouse was founded in the 1960s. Its current theater seats 200 spectators. In the academic year 2014/15, they produced a selection of at least five plays, among them Krapp's Last Tape, The Vagina Monologues, and A Midsummer Night's Dream. The playhouse attracted news coverage in the summer of 2022, when the local Upper Cumberland Pride, the Lambda Gay-Straight Alliance, and the Tech Players staged a drag performance in the on-campus theater. A video excerpt of the performance, in which a child pays a drag performer money while the performer mouths the words "Take Me To Church," was posted on-line by child protection activist Landon Starbuck.

== Traditions and campus lore ==
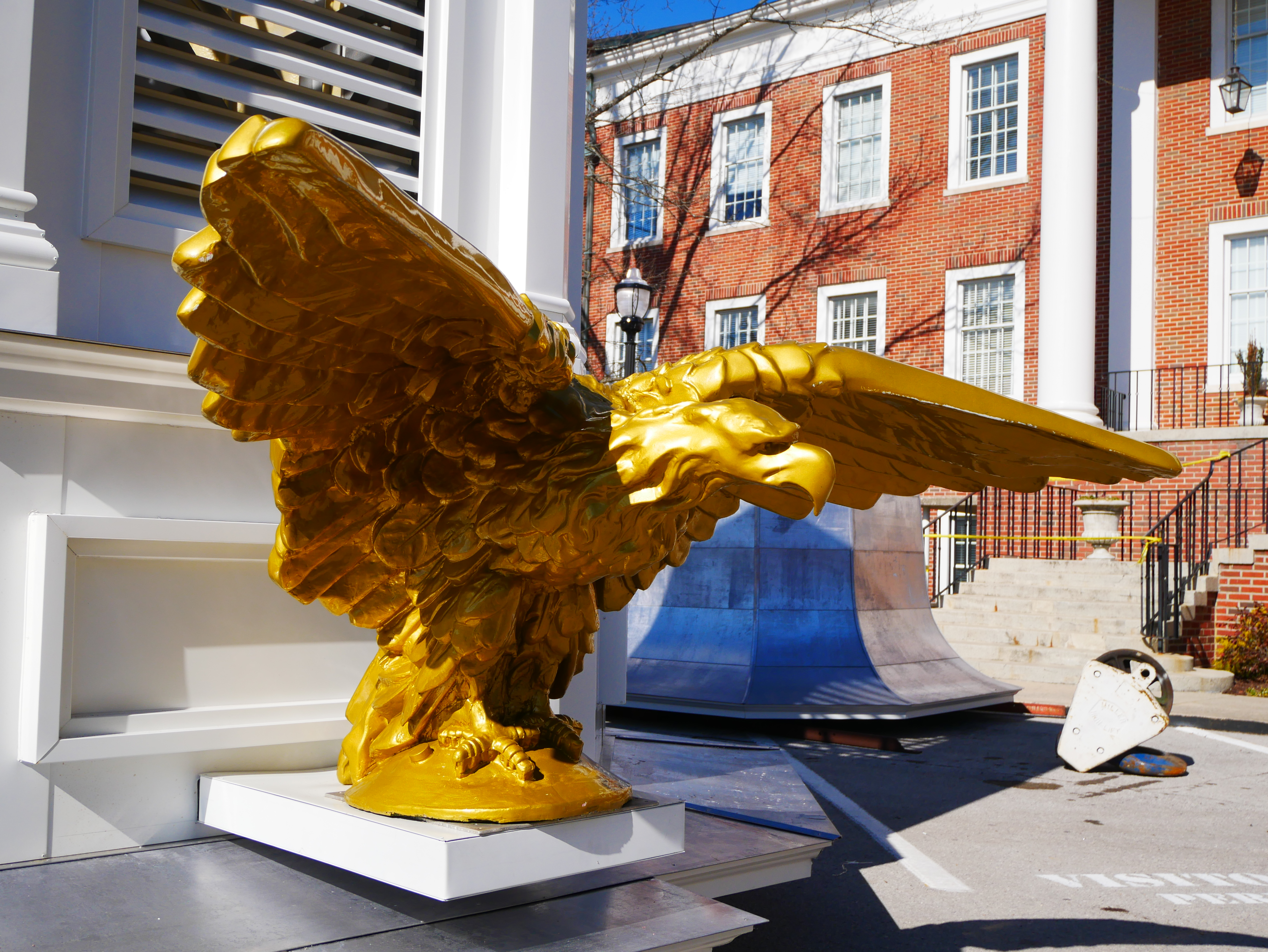
Eagle statue resting temporarily on the ground in 2022 as Derryberry's cupola was replaced

- Golden Eagle: The statue now atop Derryberry Hall was stolen by three students (Tom Moran, Roy Loudermilk, and Lewis Brown) from the lawn of the burned-out Monteagle Hotel in Monteagle, Tennessee, in November 1952. The three had hoped the eagle would provide the ultimate prop for the pep rally prior to the football game against then-rival Middle Tennessee State University (MTSU). The hotel's owner, John Harton (a former state treasurer), demanded the return of the statue and initially rejected all offers to purchase it. He finally relented and sold the statue for $500 after Governor Frank G. Clement intervened. The eagle, which weighs 70 pounds (32 kg) and has a 6-foot wing span (1.8 m), was initially placed atop Jere Whitson Hall. It was moved to its current position atop Derryberry in 1961.
- "Dammit" the dog: A former university president once said "dammit" to a dog in front of a crowd, covering by saying that was the dog's name. Dammit has his own tombstone, an operable fire hydrant, on campus opposite Derryberry Hall.
- The "Blizzard" is a tradition which started in 1984, when students celebrated the first successful shot made by Tennessee Tech in a basketball game against MTSU by throwing showers of "Tech Squares" (toilet paper) into the air. Since MTSU moved to the Sun Belt Conference, the Blizzard is now performed against Austin Peay State University.

== Significant administrative buildings ==
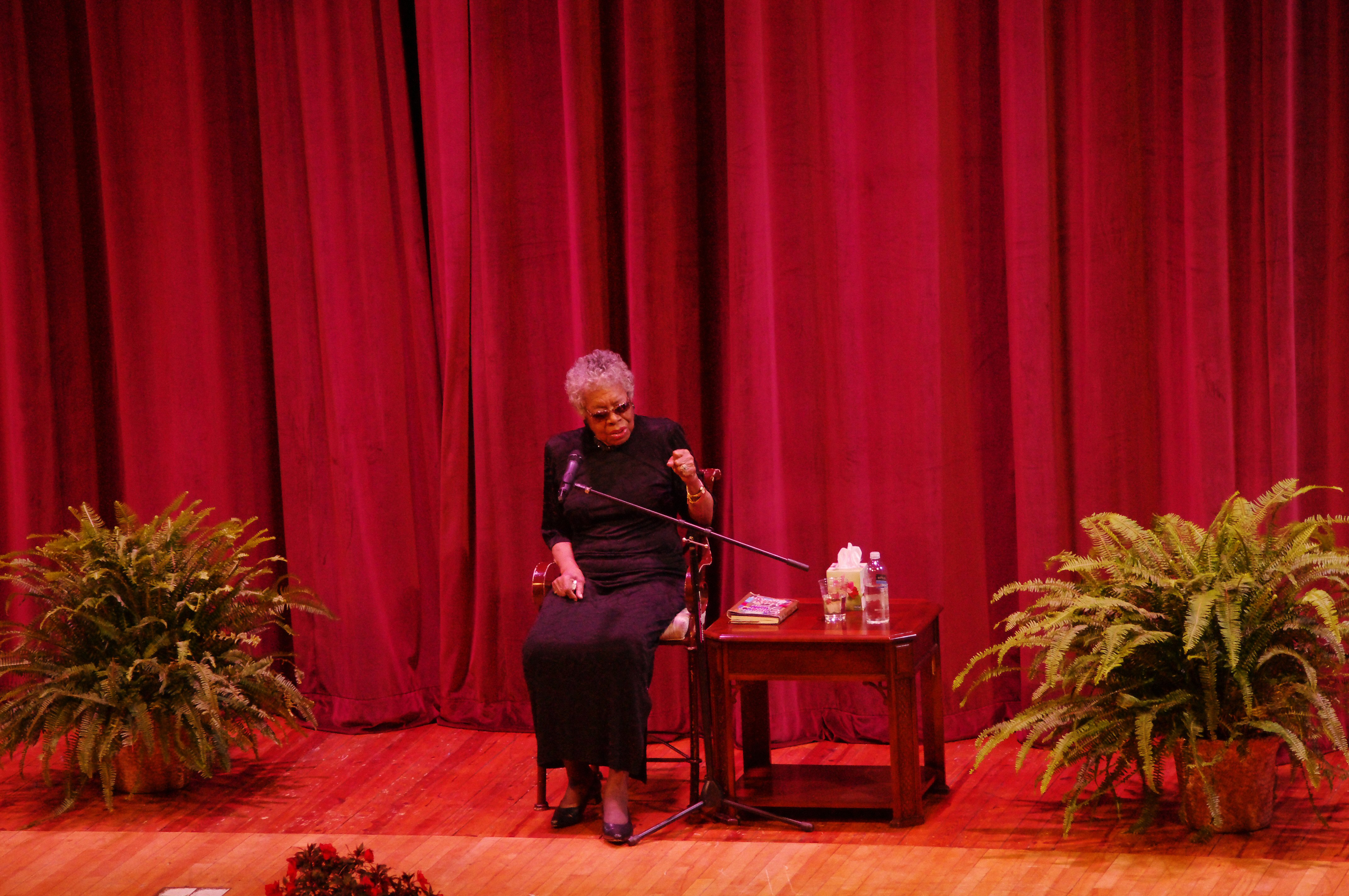
Maya Angelou speaking in the Derryberry Hall Auditorium in 2012

Derryberry Hall is the oldest building on campus; the presidents and provosts have traditionally had their offices there. The building is also the home to the university's main auditorium, Derryberry Auditorium. Derryberry was constructed in 1912 for the university's predecessor, Dixie College. It is named after Everett Derryberry, president of the university from 1940 to 1974. The building's iconic colonial-style clock tower is equipped has a carillon. Maya Angelou spoke there in 2012. Derryberry received a new cupola in 2021.

Henderson Hall is listed on the National Register of Historic Places, The building was designed by Benjamin F. Hunt, who worked for the noted regional architect R. H. Hunt. Constructed in 1931, the building is named in honor of James Manson Henderson, the first director of the university's School of Engineering.

== Residential buildings ==
=== Traditional halls ===
==== Pinkerton Quad ====
- Jobe Hall (JOBE) is a coed residence hall that is open to all majors, located on the northern side of the Pinkerton Quad. Constructed in 1969, it is named for Elsie Jobe, the university's former Dean of Women. The building's eastern end is connected to the northern end of Murphy Hall.
- M.S. Cooper Hall (MSCP) is a coed residence hall for international students, located along the western side of the Pinkerton Quad. Constructed in 1969, it is named for Mattie Sue Cooper, a former university reference librarian. M.S. Cooper Hall shares a breezeway with Pinkerton Hall.
- New Hall South (NEWS) is a coed residence hall located adjacent to New Hall North at the southern end of the Pinkerton Quad. It was constructed in 2003.

==== Capital Quad ====
- Evins Hall (EVIN) is western end of Capitol Quad. Constructed in 1966, it is named in honor of Joe L. Evins, who served in Congress from 1947 to 1977. Evins Hall shares a breezeway with Browning Hall.
- Maddux Hall (MDDX) is a coed residence hall located along the eastern side of Capitol Quad. Constructed in 1966, the building is named in honor of Jared Maddux, a former lieutenant governor of Tennessee. Maddux Hall shares a breezeway with McCord Hall.
- McCord Hall (MCRD) is a coed residence hall located along the eastern side of Capitol Quad. Constructed in 1966, the building is named in honor of Jim Nance McCord, who served as governor of Tennessee from 1945 to 1949. It shares a breeze hall located along the south side of the Capital Quad. It was constructed in 2010.

== Off-campus Buildings ==
- Hyder-Burks Agricultural Pavilion is a 3.5-acre (0.014 km^{2}) complex located about a mile west of the main campus on Highway 290 (Gainesboro Grade). Operated by the School of Agriculture, the pavilion includes a main show arena, sales arena, barn, and picnic shelter. Constructed in the mid-1990s, the pavilion is named for W. Clyde Hyder, a former animal sciences professor, and Tommy Burks, a former state senator. Hyder-Burks is also connected to Shipley Farm, in Cookeville, Tennessee, and Oakley Farm, in Livingston, Tennessee.

== Notable people ==
=== Faculty ===
R. Winston Morris

- Greg Danner, professor of music; composer
- Michael M. Gunter, professor of political science; Fulbright lecturer, authority on the Kurds and the Middle East
- Joseph Hermann, Emeritus Director of Bands; Past-President of the American Bandmasters Association
- R. Winston Morris – Emeritus Professor of tuba and euphonium; innovator in the fields of tuba performance, education, and chamber music

=== Alumni ===
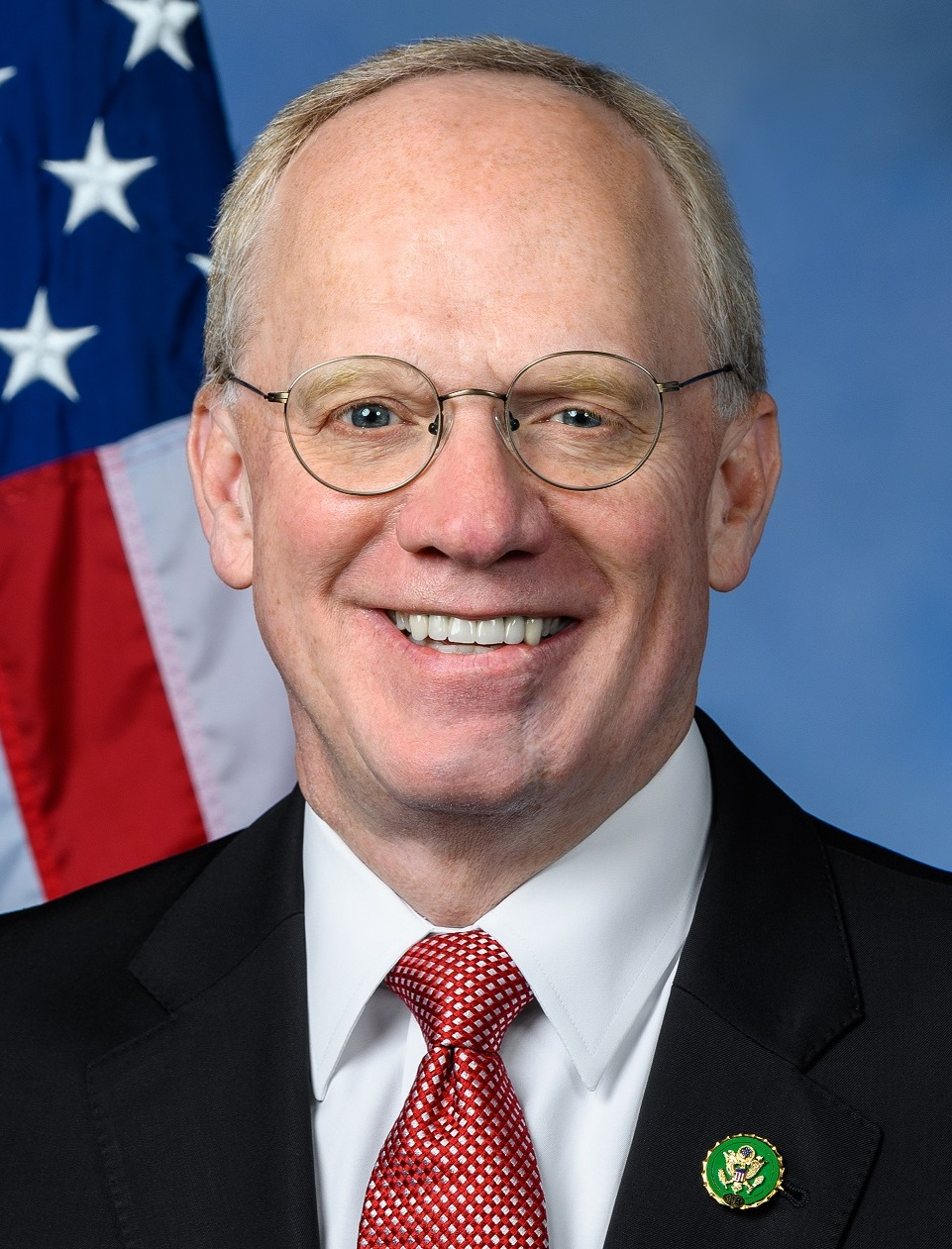
John Rose in 2023

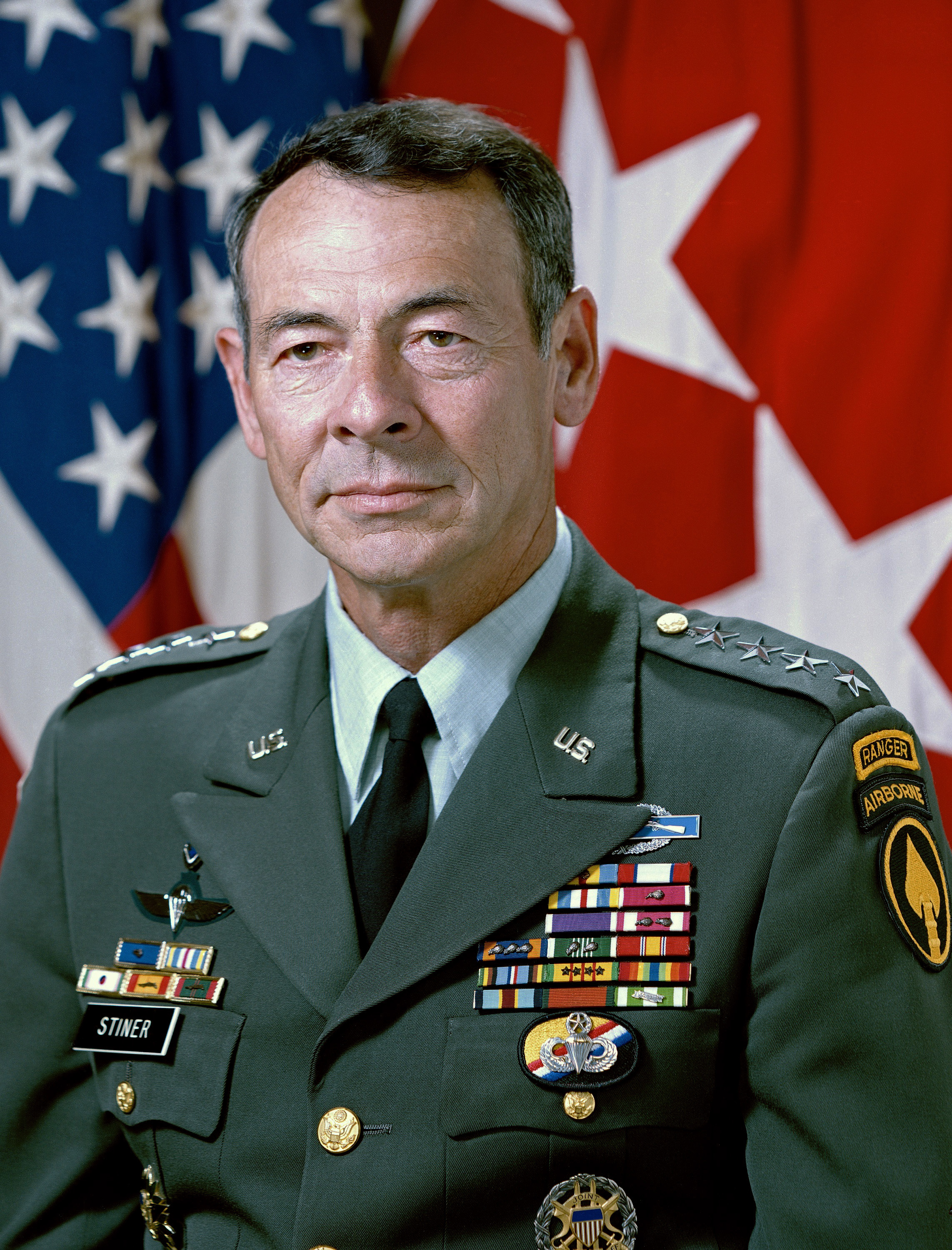
Carl Stiner in 1993

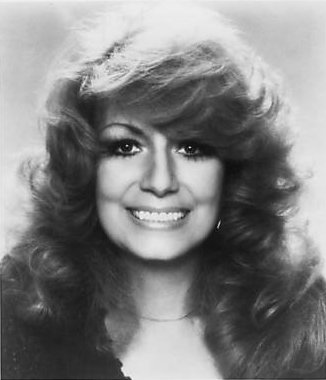
Dottie West in 1977

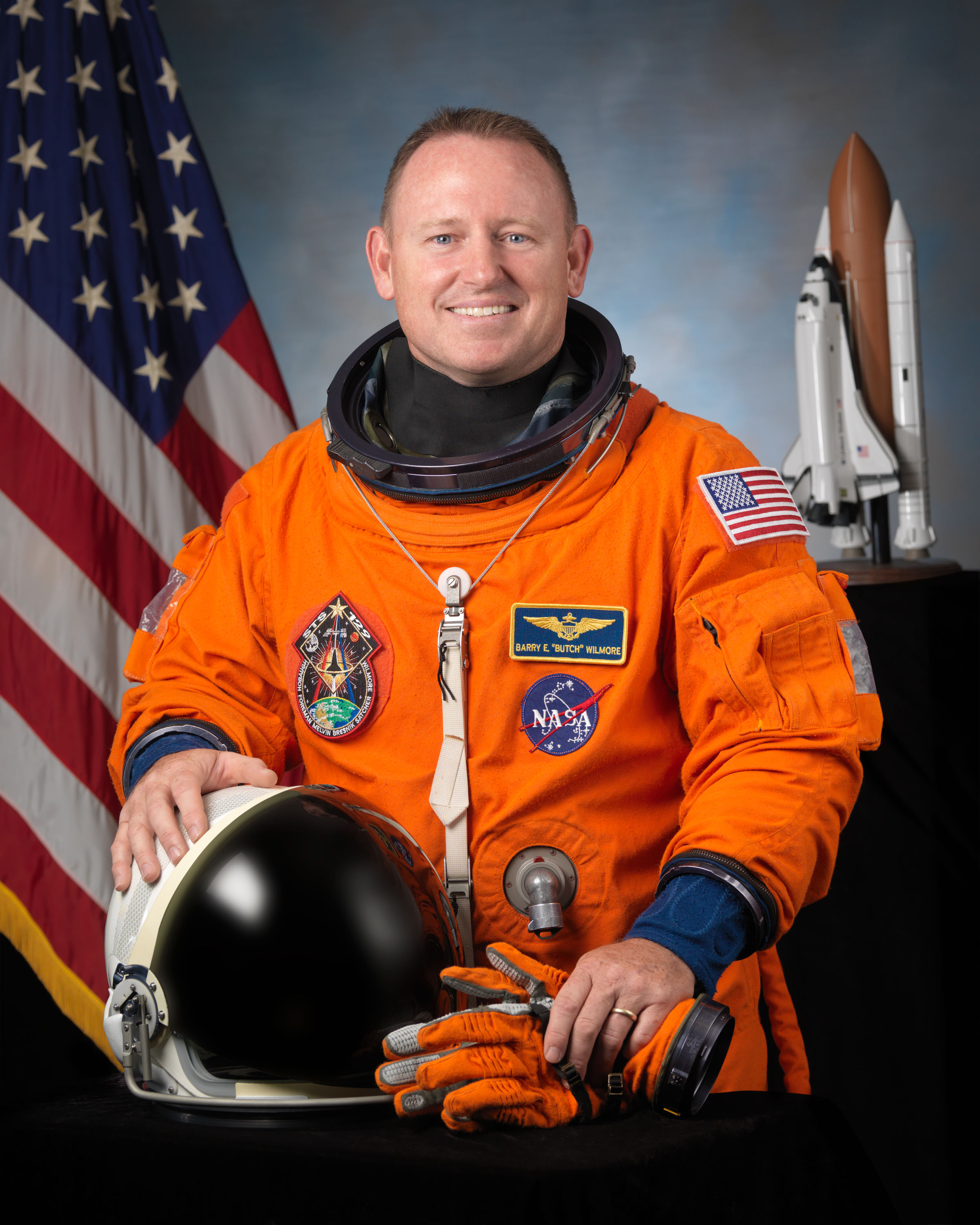
Barry Wilmore in 2009

- Jarrod Alonge, comedian and musician
- Blanton Alspaugh, Grammy-winning producer
- Rodney Atkins, Country music singer
- Paul Bailey, Tennessee state senator
- Jimmy Bedford, sixth master distiller at Jack Daniel's
- Frank Buck, Former Tennessee State Representative
- Rick Camp, professional baseball player
- Roger K. Crouch, NASA astronaut
- Trae Crowder, professional comedian
- Lincoln Davis, former U.S. congressman
- Ron Estes, U.S. congressman from Kansas
- Anthony Fisher (born 1986), basketball player in the Israeli Basketball Premier League
- Rich Froning Jr., four-time CrossFit Games Champion
- Elois Grooms, former NFL player
- Johnny H. Hayes, former TVA director and presidential campaign finance manager
- Caleb Hemmer, Tennessee State Representative
- Mike Hennigan, former NFL linebacker
- Dwight Henry, former Tennessee state legislator and gubernatorial candidate
- Jake Hoot, Country music singer and winner of The Voice (American season 17)
- Bill Jenkins, former U.S. congressman
- Kenneth Jernigan, advocate for the blind, former head of the National Federation of the Blind
- Andy Landers, women's basketball coach at the University of Georgia
- Mark H. Landes, U.S. Army major general
- Adam Liberatore, MLB pitcher for the Los Angeles Dodgers
- James A. Lindsay, author, cultural critic, and mathematician
- Brooke Mayo, FIFA soccer assistant referee, Golden Eagle member (2007–2010)
- Barbara McConnell, New Jersey state legislator
- Kevin Murphy, NBA player for the Utah Jazz
- Frank Omiyale, NFL player
- Da'Rick Rogers, NFL player
- John Rose, U.S. Representative for Tennessee's 6th Congressional District
- Erik Sabel, former MLB player
- Daron Schoenrock, college baseball coach at Memphis
- David Simmons, Florida state senator
- Yongduan Song, computer scientist
- Ken Sparks, football coach at Carson-Newman College
- Scott Stallings, professional golfer
- Carl Stiner, former Commander in Chief of the United States Special Operations Command
- Harry Stonecipher, former CEO of Boeing, McDonnell Douglas, and Sundstrand
- Barry A. Vann, author, lecturer
- Lonnie Warwick, former NFL player
- Dottie West, country singer
- Barry Wilmore, NASA astronaut and United States Navy test pilot
- Jim Youngblood, former American football linebacker in the National Football League for the Los Angeles Rams and Washington Redskins
