= Michigan State University Spartan Marching Band =

Marching band of Michigan State University

Spartan Marching Band
- School: Michigan State University
- Conference: Big Ten
- Founded: 1870
- Director: David Thornton (2017-present)
- Associate Director: Arris Golden (2018-present)
- Members: 300+
- Fight song: "Victory for MSU"

Uniform
- Website: http://www.spartanmarchingband.com

The Spartan Marching Band (SMB) is the marching band of Michigan State University. The band has over 300 members and was founded in 1870. Notable music educator Leonard Falcone directed the band from 1927 through 1967.

The band performs every year at home football games, travels to some away games, as well as various events held by the university. The band has also performed for five U.S. Presidents, performed at five Rose Bowls, two World's Fairs, and one World Series.

== History ==
=== Beginnings and MAC military band ===
The band was founded in 1870 as a 10-member student-led group, shortly after the founding of the Michigan Agricultural College (presently Michigan State University). Ransom McDonough Brooks was a student and former civil war veteran who first led the band. The band operated informally during this time.

In 1885, an ROTC was formed on campus and the band was reorganized as a cadet military band. During this time the band was led by students and military officers, including cornetist I.E. Hill, and Professor B.G. Edgerton, who was the first to lead the band in performance before a President Theodore Roosevelt in 1907.

Other directors in this period included A.J. Clark, Frederick Abel, J.S. Taylor, and Carl Kuhlman. Taylor would lead the first band to perform the new college fight song, written by cheerleader Francis Lankey. That performance would come shortly after young Lankey's death in 1919.

=== The Falcone years ===
In 1927, Leonard Falcone started as director of the band. Falcone was an Italian immigrant and the brother of University of Michigan band director Nicholas Falcone. Many of the band's traditions were established during his 40-year tenure and the band changed from a 65-member ROTC auxiliary into an adjunct of the new department that would become today's College of Music.

When the career of Nicholas came to a premature end due to illness in 1935, Leonard agreed to direct the University of Michigan band concurrently with the Michigan State band while his brother sought treatment. MSU began playing Big Ten Conference football in 1952 and during this time the band received its first green and white uniforms. The SMB made their first appearance in the Rose Bowl in 1954.

Falcone was a professor of baritone and euphonium, and a prolific transcriber and arranger of music for concert band. He arranged and rearranged the fight song continuously throughout his career.

Falcone drastically increased the visibility of the band through an aggressive schedule of performances and trips. He added 3 US Presidential performances to the band's resume as well as 3 televised Rose Parade and game performances in the 50s and 60s.

From 1960 to 1969, Bill Moffit was assistant director of the band alongside Falcone. Moffit developed the "Patterns in Motion" drill movement concept, centered around a 4-person squad system during this time, including the current pregame drill used by the band.

After Falcone's retirement, Moffit had started a position as the director of the Purdue All-American Marching Band and in 1984, took the Purdue band to Falcone's neighborhood the morning before a football game to perform on the street.

Falcone retired and took on a role as professor emeritus in 1967, though he remained a fixture around the campus until weeks before his death in 1985.

=== 1970s to modern day ===
The band was the 1988 recipient of the Sudler Trophy for collegiate marching bands, administered by the John Philip Sousa Foundation.

In 1989, John Madden became director of the band, and after his retirement in 2017, became the second-longest-serving director in band history, 28 years. During his tenure, the band traveled to 17 bowl games, 2 presidential performances and some foreign. Upon his retirement, he earned the distinction of Professor Emeritus and Emeritus Director of the SMB.

The current director is Dr. David Thornton, a former masters and doctoral student at MSU, as well as the assistant director for the 2015 and 2016 seasons.

=== Former band directors ===
- A.J. Clark (1907-1916, 1918–1919, 1922–1925)
- Frederic Abel (1916-1918)
- J.S. Taylor (1919-1922)
- Carl Kuhlman (1925-1927)
- Leonard Falcone (1927-1967)
- Harry Begian (1967-1970)
- Kenneth Bloomquist (1970-1977)
- Thad Hegerberg (1977)
- Carl Chevallard (1978)
- Dave Catron (1979-1987)
- William Wiedrich (1988)
- John Madden (1989-2016)

=== Former assistant or associate band directors ===
- Oscar Stover (1953-1960)
- William Moffit (1960-1969)
- Joe Parker (1969)
- Dave Catron (1970-1973)
- Thad Hegerberg (1974-1976)
- Carl Chevallard (1977)
- William Wiedrich (1982-1987)
- Isaiah Odajima (2006-2008)
- Cormac Cannon (2009-2014)
- David Thornton (2015-2016)
- Simon Holoweiko (2017)

== Instrumentation ==
The Spartan Marching Band instrumentation is notable among college bands in the United States. It traditionally is made up of brass, saxophones, and percussion, with no flutes, piccolos, or clarinets. E-flat cornets play the high "woodwind-like" parts. Flutes and clarinets were phased out in 1968 as Spartan Stadium expanded and more sound was desired. The E-flat cornet in the SMB instrumentation is reminiscent of the standard British brass band tradition.

As part of the band, all instruments are provided to members. The presence of "like instruments" has further enhanced the sound of the band, as well as creating a uniform look with silver-plated instruments.

- 1 or 2 Drum Majors
- 1 to 3 Feature Twirlers
- 40 member color guard
- 34 Alto Saxophones
- 18 Tenor Saxophones
- 8 E flat Cornets
- 52 B Flat Trumpets
- 28 Mellophones
- 36 Trombones
- 4 Bass Trombones
- 18 Baritones
- 24 Sousaphones
- 18 Big Ten Flags
- 10 or 11 Snare Drums
- 5 or 6 Tenor Drums
- 7 Bass Drums
- 10 Cymbals

== Organization ==
=== Current director and instructors ===
In 2017, Dr. David Thornton, who previously served as the associate director of the Spartan Marching Band in 2015 and 2016, was appointed Director of the Spartan Marching Band and associate director of Bands at MSU.

In March 2018, Dr. Arris Golden was selected as associate director of the SMB, and assistant director of MSU Bands. Prior, Golden had a brief tenure as the assistant director of The Marching Tar Heels.

Working directly under the director are graduate assistants and various instructors for visuals, color guard and percussion. Additionally, there are graduate assistants are graduate students from the MSU College of Music who arrange music, design drill, rehearse music, and teach on the field in preparation for halftime and pregame shows. Administratively, graduate assistants conduct challenges and auditions.

Drum Major Ian McNabb performing the traditional drum major backbend during pregame

=== Drum Major(s) ===
Typically, the Spartan Marching Band has only one drum major for the entire ensemble. However, in years when the drum major is a graduating senior there are two, allowing the new drum major to have one season of apprenticeship. The position is chosen through an audition process. The drum major and band president are the top ranking student leaders in the organization.

== Traditions ==
=== MSU Shadows ===
Every band member must learn the MSU alma mater, MSU Shadows, which was arranged by MSC Music Professor H. Owen Reed, with words by coach Barney Traynor. Sung in four-part harmony, MSU Shadows was introduced in 1948 and is played and/or sung by the band. After marching to Spartan Stadium, the band gathers near the tunnel leading onto the football field and sings before lining up for the pregame Kickstep entrance. It is always played during the Pregame performance. MSU Shadows is also sung at the end of game days, after marching back and usually performing for the sizable crowd of band fans. After the final home game of the year after the seniors sing the infrequently-sung second verse, the content of which is about one's love for MSU remaining after graduating. MSU Shadows is also featured prominently during the annual Alumni Band Reunion Day, during which band alumni gather from around the world to perform at halftime during a home game.

=== The Series ===
The series is a combination of several drum cadences that was developed in the late 1950s and completed in 1966. This is traditionally played when the band marches to Spartan Stadium before every home game. The series combines a plethora of elite drumming along with intense and intimidating visuals and vocals from the band as they march. This is a trademark tradition of the Spartan Marching Band, and something no band has successfully been able to replicate.

=== The Kickstep ===
The “Kickstep” is the marching technique used for the bands pregame show entrance. It’s a high-paced drum cadence played as the band runs out of the tunnel.

== Bowl games ==
The Spartan Marching Band has made appearances at the following events:

- 2015 Cotton Bowl
- 1954, 1956, 1966, 1988, and 2014 Rose Bowl
- 2009 and 2011 Capital One Bowl
- 2012 Outback Bowl
- 2013 Buffalo Wild Wings Bowl
- 2007 Champs Sports Bowl
- 2003 and 2010 Alamo Bowl
- 2001 Silicon Valley Football Classic
- 2000 Citrus Bowl
- 1996 and 1990 Sun Bowl
- 1995 Independence Bowl
- 1993 St. Jude Liberty Bowl
- 1990 John Hancock Bowl
- 1989 Mazda Gator Bowl
- 1985 All-American Bowl
- 1984 Cherry Bowl
- A portion of the SMB also traveled to the 1993 Coca-Cola Bowl in Tokyo, Japan and the 1997 Aloha Bowl in Honolulu, HI.
