= Concert march =

Marches notated to be performed in a concert

A concert march is a march specifically composed for a formal concert or other audience event. While concert marches are usually written for a concert band, brass band or an orchestra, some concert marches have also been composed for solo instrument such as piano or organ. Prior to 1820, the majority of march music was composed for military use by military bands. Beginning in the 1820s a shift occurred in which mainstream classical composers wrote less frequently for military ensembles but would create concert marches to be played by orchestras as character pieces. Because concert marches are played by ensembles that are stationary, composers creating concert marches ceased connecting the march to the context of marching feet. This separation from its original context led to stylistic changes: a clear separation in style between the military march and the concert march.

In the United States, the popularization of the concert march can be traced to late 19th century with publications like Metronome magazine embracing the form as its own separate genre of march. With the growing prevalence of concert bands, the concert march developed as a way to perform marches on stage. John Philip Sousa was instrumental in the development of an American approach to the concert march. Previously the older da capo march utilized a circular structure which Sousa felt lacked a climax inherently within its compositional form. Within the concert march genre, Sousa pursued a new dramatic shape and theatricality within the march which he began experimenting with in the 1880s. His style influenced other composers of band music in this genre. Sousa was a supporter of the community band movement of the late 19th century and early 20th century in the United States, and many of his compositions, including his concert marches, became a staple part of the community band repertoire. Many of Sousa's marches for marching band were re-orchestrated by Sousa so that they could be played as a concert march. This required reducing the number of instruments which created a thinner texture within his concert march versions.

Concert marches are included in the curriculums of school band programs. As with every single type of march (from Military to Concert to Screamer and contest marches), they usually have an introduction, at least three melodies, and a trio.

== Concert marches by composer ==
This incomplete list consists mainly of marches identified by their composers as concert marches. Note that many marches originally written for other contexts, such as military marches, ceremonial marches, or works for marching band, have also been played as concert marches; often in adapted versions. This list doesn't include adapted marches and is limited to marches specifically created as concert marches in their initial presentation. For this reason, many prominent march composers like Sousa only have a limited number of works listed here because they predominantly wrote their marches originally for other contexts. Other well known march composers may not be listed at all if they wrote only for military bands or marching bands and never specifically composed for the concert band or orchestra. This list also does not include marches which were originally written as part of a larger work which are often played in concert such as marches written within an opera or ballet or for use in a play. The list may also omit marches which functioned as concert marches but were not specifically labeled as concert marches by their creators unless reliable sources have identified them as concert marches. For this reason the list omits many early concert marches which were written in a time period before the term concert march became widely used.

=== A-C ===
Composer, Concert marches
Composer	Concert marches	References
Howard E. Akers (1913–1984)	"El Alamo" (1960)	
Gabriel Allier (1963–1924)	"Marche de Gala"	
Emil Ascher (1859–1922)	"Fanfare Militaire" (1899)	
Alfred John Ashpole (1892–1990)	"Hemingford", "Sheringham"	
Christoph Bach (1835–1927)	"Grand Festival" (1888)	
George D. Barnard (1858–1933)	"Elk's Parade" (1890)	
James Barnes (b. 1949)	"Golden Brass" (1974), "Sterling Brass" (1981), "Festival Concert March" (1982), "Thunderbolt" (1984)	
Robert L. Bauernschmidt Jr. (1922–2010)	"The Californian" 1957	
Gordon Beecher (1904–1973)	"The Ramparts We Watch"	
Walter Beeler (1908–1973)	"Legions of Victory"	
Theodore Bendix (1862–1935)	"Dance of the Bugs", "Pansies" (1905)	
David Bennett (1892–1990)	"Majesty of America" (1949)	
Robert Russell Bennett (1894–1981)	"The Fabulous Country" (1975)	
Joe Berryman (1904–1988)	"Goliad" (1936), "Spanish Castle" (1958)	
Jerry Bilik (b. 1933)	"The 49th Star" (1959)	
G. Bonelli	"Symphonic Concert March" (composed before 1915; published 1968)	
Rosario Bourdon (1885–1961)	"Through the Line" (1937), "Step Ahead" (1942)	
Richard W. Bowles (1918–2009)	"Burst of Flame" (1955), "Heat Lightning" (1958), "The Minstrels" (1965), "The Show Piece" (1967), "Sword and Shield (1971)	
Oscar Bradley (1889–1948)	"We the People" (1955)	
Forrest Buchtel (1899–1996)	"Festal Day" (1934)	
James Burden (1923–1983)	"Royal Pageantry" (1980)	
John Cacavas (1930–2014)	"Burnished Brass" (1963), "The Sentry Boy" (1965), "Gallant Men" (1967), "Tunes of Glory" (1971)	
Roland Cardon (1929–2001)	"Nuts City" (also known as "Bastogne"), "Ostrawa"	
Charles Carter (1926–1999)	"Capitol Hill" (1964), "Zodiac" (1973)	
Albert L. Casseday (1892–1970)	"Texas Plains" (1928)	
Samuel Coleridge-Taylor (1875–1912)	"Hemo Dance; Ethiopia Saluting the Colors"	
James Curnow (b. 1943)	"Spirit of '76" (1975), "High Bridge" (1976), "Journey to Centaurus" (1980), "The Minuteman" (1988), "Shenandoah" (1989)	
Frederic Curzon (1899–1973)	"Sol e Sevilla" (published using the pseudonym José Jordana)	

=== D-I ===
Composer, Concert marches
Composer	Concert marches	References
Melvin L. Daniels (b. 1931)	"Tower"	
Davide delle Cese (1856–1938)	"Inglesina"	
Joseph de Luca (1890–1935)	"Medieval Pageantry" (1929)	
Lamont Downs (b. 1951)	"RS-2" (1970), "DDA 30X"	
Vivian Dunn (1908–1995)	"Cockleshell Heroes", "Comando Patrol"	
John Edmondson	"Major Murray" (1986), "Omaha Beach" (1987), "Invincible" (1988)	
Austyn R. Edwards (1891–1977)	"All State Triumphal" (1944)	
Edward Elgar (1857–1934)	"Pomp and Circumstance Marches" (series of marches composed between 1901 and 1930)	
Frank William Erickson (1923–1996)	"Beaded Belts" (1955), "Citadel" (1964)	
Emil Ermatinger (1873–1953)	"Schlusselbanner"	
Joseph Farigoul (1860–1933)	"Marche de Cortege"	
Kenneth Farrell (1920–2002)	"Thunder West" (1956)	
Sandy Feldstein (1940–2007)	"First Concert March" (197?), "Celebration" (1980), "Circus Maximus" (1984),	
Carl Frangkiser (1894–1967)	"Majestic Splendor" (1941, published using the pseudonym M. Sanford)	
John Francis Gilder (1837–1908)	"Transcendental" (1890)	
Don Gillis (1912–1978)	"Unistrut Concert March" (1958)	
Morton Gold (b. 1933)	"Concert March"	
Gus Guentzel (1868–1950)	"The Host of Youth" (1943)	
Herbert Haines (1880–1923)	"London Scottish Concert March"	
Harold E. Harris	"Glory of America" (1940)	
Lumir C. Havlicek (1895–1969)	"Westmoreland"	
Frank Henninger	"Inferno" (1934)	
Dieter Herbog (1925–2005)	"Hallo Partner" (1973), "Schlagzeilen" (1967)	
Alexis Hollaender (1840–1924)	"March, Op . 39, No. 1 (D flat)"	
Guy Earl Holmes (1873–1945)	"March Heroic", "Heroic" (1935), "Colorado" (1937), "Victory and Fame" (1939), "Stratoliner" (1941), "March Courageous" (1943), "Champion of Champions" (published posthumously in 1955),	
Hiroshi Hoshina (b. 1936)	"Prince of Antares" (1967)	
John Howlett (1906–1985)	"Leicester Square Looks Round" (1953)	
Arthur Wellesley Hughes (1870–1950)	"Vindicator"	

=== J-N ===
Composer, Concert marches
Composer	Concert marches	References
Robert E. Jager (b. 1939)	"Courage to Serve" (1972)	
Edward Jakobowski (1856–1929)	"Soldier's Life" (published posthumously in 1942)	
Joseph Willcox Jenkins (1928–2014)	"Pieces of Eight"	
Cecil Karrick (1918–2014)	"Dean Dowdy" (1988), "Capital City" (1988)	
Karl King (1891–1971)	"Diamond Jubilee" (1961)	
John Leroy Kinyon (1918–2002)	"Monterey Jack" (1969)	
Ervin Kleffman (1892–1987)	"America, The Glorious" (1954), "Pride of the Pacific" (1955)	
Lev Knipper (1898–1974)	"Am-Rus" (1943)	
William P. Latham (1917–2004)	"Brighton Beach" (1954), "Proud Heritage" (1956)	
Jack Kenneth Lee (1921–2005)	"Crown of Glory", "Land of Liberty"	
Franz Lehár (1870–1948)	"Gold and Silver Concert Waltz" (arranged as a concert march by Frank D. Cofield; published 1959)	
Erling Ingvald Lian (1917–1998)	"Cardinals on Parade" (1953)	
Robert Lowden (1920–1998)	"Hollybush" (1968), "Stratford Cove" (1985)	
Donald N. Luckenbill (1915–2006)	"The Men of the Legion", "When the Sirens Sound"	
Dudley H. McCosh (1881–1929)	"Grand Opening"	
Anne McGinty (b. 1945)	"The Challenger" (1986), "Diamond Ridge" (1989)	
George Frederick McKay (1899–1970)	"Western You" (1941)	
George Melachrino (1909–1965)	"London Pageant" (1951)	
Donald I. Moore (1910–1998)	"Marcho Scherzo" (1952), "Seadragon" (1959)	
Theldon Myers (b. 1927)	"Constellation" (1961)	
Václav Nelhýbel (1919–1996)	"High Plains" (1972)	
Sammy Nestico (1924–2021)	"Horizons West" (1963), "Vaquero Concert March" (1967)	

=== O-S ===
Composer, Concert marches
Composer	Concert marches	References
Geoffrey O'Hara (1882–1967)	"Youth on Parade" (c. 1938)	
Joseph Olivadoti (1893–1977)	"Hall of Fame" (1931), "March of Youth" (1936), "National Victors" (1936), "Scepter of Liberty" (1941), "Legions of Victory" (1941), "Pride and Progress" (1956), "Our Glorious Land" (1957), "Look Forward" (1959), "Festive Spirit" (1960)	
John O'Reilly (born 1940)	"First Concert March" (1988)	
Eric Osterling (1926–2005)	"The Nutmeggers" (1954), "Glory of the Sea" (1957), "Totem Pole" (1959), "Mount of the Might" (1962), "Bandology" (1963), "Thundercrest" (1964), "Tall Cedars" (1968), "Mustang" (1968), "Questar" (1978), "Showstopper" (1979), "Bandalier" (1984), "First Flight" (1986), "The Suncoaster" (1987)	
Acton Ostling (1906–1993)	"Brass Pageantry" (1949), "Echoes of Freedom" (1954), "Friends of Old" (1954)	
Graham T. Overgard (1903–1994)	"Ballade Bravura" (1958)	
Thad Parr	"Men of Minnesota" (1949)	
Heinz Dieter Paul (1943–2019)	"Potz Blitz" (1977)	
Stan Pethel (b. 1950)	"Hall and Gwinnett" (1975)	
James Ployhar (1926–2007)	"Sodermanland" (1972), "The Original 13" (1975)	
Jindřich Praveček (1909–2000)	"Die Goldene Stadt" (1974)	
Heribert Raich (b. 1939)	"Kreuzfahrt" (1973)	
Alfred Reed (1921–2005)	"Pro Texana" (1984), "Second Century" (1986), "Golden Eagle" (1990), "Mr. Music!" (1990)	
Joseph John Richards (1878–1956)	"Emblem of Unity" (1941), "Crusade for Freedom" (1951)	
Miklós Rózsa (1907–1995)	"El Cid" (1961)	
Hilarion Rubio y Francesco (1902–1985)	"Anniversary", "Kinayumos", "Sanebel", "The Serenade"	
Karl Safaric (born 1944)	"Junge Garde" (1982)	
Takanobu Saitō (1924–2004)	"Kagayaku Eikan" (1968)	
Mariano San Miguel Urcelay (1879–1935)	"La Guardia de Corps"	
Chōsuke Satō (1906–1983)	"Nippon Bare" (1964), "Nishoki (1969)	
Richard S. Saylor (1926–2009)	"Prisoner of War" (1956)	
Willy Schütz-Erb (1918–1992)	"Grossglockner Trip" (1983)	
Wesley Shepard (1908–1993)	"Band of the Land" (1957)	
Claude T. Smith (1932–1987)	"Horizons West"	
Lawrence Rackley Smith (b. 1932)	"Guadio Exsultans"	
Stanley Smith Masters (1903–1984)	"The Queen's Trumpeters" (published using the pseudonym Edrich Siebert)	
Anton Othmar Sollfelner (b. 1935)	"Vorwarts, nie zuruck" (1972), "Promenade am Worthersee" (1974), "Osterreichs junge Soldaten" (1976)	
Siegfried Somma (1910–1994)	"Austria Salutes California" (1984)	
John Philip Sousa (1854–1932)	"El Capitan" (1896, a concert march crafted by Sousa from music within his operetta of the same name), "The White Rose" (1917),	
Max Steiner (1888–1971)	"Forward the Light Brigade" (1948)	
William Bradley Strickland (1929–1990)	"Manhatta", "Avante Garde"	
Alfred F. Sturchio (1928–2024)	"Gallant Gladiator", "Victorious Army"	
James Swearingen (b. 1947)	"Silvercrest"	

=== T-Z ===
Composer, Concert marches
Composer	Concert marches	References
Sepp Tanzer (1907–1983)	"Raketenflug"	
James L. Tarver (1916–1976)	"La Bonita" (1967)	
John Tatgenhorst (1938–2024)	"Colonel Sam" (1977)	
William Teague (1922–2021)	"Hail to Our Flag"	
Sepp Thaler (1901–1982)	"Mein Schones Sudtirol"	
Jan Uhlíř (1894–1970)	"Concert March"	
Werner Van Cleemput (1930-2006)	"Summa Cum Laude"	
John Arthur “Fritz” Velke II (1930-2005)	"Tommie Jack" (1975)	
Paul Wäldchen (1892-1954)	"El Matador" (published posthumously in 1971)	
Harold L. Walters (1918-1984)	"The Golden Eagle" (1953), "New Horizons" (1961)	
Paul V. Yoder (1908–1990)	"Victory" (1946)	
Carl Maria von Weber (1786–1826)	"Concert March, Op. 3"	
Ernest Weber (1883–1953)	"Great Century" (1948)	
Jaromír Weinberger (1896–1967)	"Homage to the Pioneers" (1940)	
Kenneth Whitcomb (1926–1997)	"Jubilee Concert March" (1956, published under the pseudonym George Kenney), "County Fair" (1975)	
Clifton Williams (1923–1976)	"Academic Processional" (1961), "The Sinfonians" (1961), "Strategic Air Command" (1964), "Border Festival" (1967), "The Patriots" (1970)	
Frank Winegar (1901–1988)	"Litely and Politely" (1952)	
Hermann Adolf Wollenhaupt (1827–1863)	"Marche de Concert" (1860; written for piano)	
Julian Work (1910–1995)	"Stand the Storm" (1963)	
Paul V. Yoder (1908–1990)	"Victory" (1946)	
William G. Yule (1866–1921)	"Peerless Concert March" (1895)	
John Stepan Zamecnik (1872–1953)	"March of the Brave", "March of Sparta" (1917), "Sons of Fame" (1936)	
