= Kim Conway Haley =

American soccer player (born 1972)

Kim Conway
Personal information
- Full name: Kimberly Conway Haley
- Birth name: Kimberly Conway
- Date of birth: September 5, 1972 (age 54)
- Place of birth: Rockville Centre, New York, U.S.
- Height: 5 ft 4 in (1.63 m)
- Position: Defender

Youth career
- South Side MS
- –1990: South Side Cyclones

College career
Years	Team	Apps	(Gls)
1990–1993	Virginia Cavaliers		

Senior career*
Years	Team	Apps	(Gls)
1994–1995	Long Island Rough Riders		
- Puck Deventer

International career
1993	United States	4	(0)

Managerial career
- Rockville Centre Legacy
- * Club domestic league appearances and goals

Kimberly Conway Haley (née Conway; born September 5, 1972) is an American former soccer player who played as a defender, making four appearances for the United States women's national team.

== Career ==
Conway Haley played for the South Side Middle School youth team, as well as the South Side Cyclones in high school, winning a state championship with the latter. In college, she played for the Virginia Cavaliers from 1990 to 1993. She was an NSCAA Second-Team All-American in 1993, and was selected to the All-ACC and All-Academic teams the same year. She was included in the NSCAA All-Region and ACC All-Tournament teams in 1992 and 1993, and was a finalist for the Heisman Trophy in 1993.

Conway Haley made her international debut for the United States on July 7, 1993, in a friendly match against Australia. In total, she made four appearances for the U.S., earning her final cap on July 14, 1993, in a friendly match against Russia.

In club soccer, Conway Haley played for the Long Island Rough Riders, helping the team to win the inaugural season of the USL W-League in 1995. She then joined Puck Deventer in the Netherlands.

Conway Haley is the coach of the Rockville Centre Legacy girls' soccer team. She also coaches local lacrosse. In 2017, Conway Haley was inducted into the Long Island Soccer Player Hall of Fame.

== Personal life ==
Conway Haley grew up in Rockville Centre, New York, where she lives with her husband, Ethan, and her two daughters. She currently works for Condé Nast in Manhattan.

== Career statistics ==
=== International ===
United States
Year	Apps	Goals
1993	4	0
Total	4	0
