= Gina Naomi Baez =

American actress, singer, and songwriter

- Education: Pace University - BFA in musical theatre
- Occupations: Actress; Singer; Songwriter
- Website: ginanaomibaez.com

Gina Naomi Baez is an American actor, singer, and songwriter. With a flourishing acting career having landed roles in Spike Lee's She's Gotta Have It, Orange Is the New Black and most recently CBS's FBI. She has appeared in numerous Off-Broadway and regional stage plays including as Celia in Rattlesnake Kate, Esmeralda in The Hunchback of Notre Dame, Dulcinea del Toboso in Man of La Mancha, and Agnes in A Taste of Things to Come (among others). Baez has also seen great success with her YouTube channel which has built an impressive following. Her infamous "Lizzo's Truth Hurts x Hocus Pocus" parody music video went viral after LIZZO herself reposted it, as well as Bette Midler. She has also released several songs, including a 2015 EP (You and Me) and a variety of covers on her YouTube channel (often with Tinkerbelle the Dog).

== Early life and education ==
Baez is a native of Rockville Centre, New York. She began singing as young as age six and started writing songs in eighth grade. Around that time, she was diagnosed with Hodgkin's lymphoma. She underwent chemotherapy and radiation therapy which caused her to lose her hair. While undergoing treatment, she founded the non-profit, Kids Performing Who Kare, which continues to exist and raise money for the NYU Winthrop Hospital's Cancer Center for Kids where she was treated. The non-profit puts on stage productions and concerts with children ages 6 to 18.

Baez attended South Side High School in Rockville Centre and graduated in 2006. She moved on to Pace University where she earned a Bachelor of Fine Arts in musical theatre in 2010. Prior to graduating college, Baez earned a role in Under Fire which ran during the New York Musical Theatre Festival (NYMF) at the Theater at St. Clement's in September and October 2009. In January 2010, she appeared in the ensemble cast for Pace's production of Quanah at the Schaeberle Studio.

== Career ==
After college, one of Baez's first roles came as Anna Leonowens in an August 2010 production of The King and I with the St. Gregory Theater Group. In October 2010, she directed a production of the musical, 13 in association with the Rockville Centre Guild for the Arts. The following month, she and select cast members from a Kids Performing Who Kare production of Sweeney Todd were asked to perform for a benefit at the New World Stages theater. In October 2011, she played Jo March in a Rockville Centre Guild for the Arts production of Little Women.

In September 2013, Baez premiered a music video for a song entitled, "Downtown," at a movie theater in Westbury, New York. Tinkerbelle the Dog was featured in the video. In January 2014, she released a video cover of the song "Let It Go" from the 2013 Disney film, Frozen. The video again featured an appearance from Tinkerbelle the Dog, who also appeared in the August 2014 music video for Baez's song, "Cupcakes." In November 2015, Baez independently released an EP entitled, You and Me.

In January 2016, she auditioned for and appeared in an episode of the 15th season of American Idol. She sang Meghan Trainor's "Lips Are Movin" but failed to progress beyond the judges. That month, she also had a leading role as Agnes Crookshank in a production of A Taste of Things to Come at the Bucks County Playhouse in New Hope, Pennsylvania. In June 2016, she appeared in a small role in an episode of the Netflix series, Orange is the New Black. The following month, she appeared as Nancy for a production of Oliver! at the Warehouse Theater at Fairfield Theatre Company in Fairfield, Connecticut. In September 2017, she earned a role as one of the street urchins, Chiffon, in a production of Little Shop of Horrors at the Fulton Theatre in Lancaster, Pennsylvania.

In May 2018, Baez appeared in Women on Fire: Stories from the Frontlines at the off-Broadway Royal Family Arts Space. In November 2018, she took on the role of Esmeralda for a production of The Hunchback of Notre Dame at the Argyle Theatre in Babylon, New York. In 2019, she will have a recurring role as Marisol in the second season of Spike Lee's Netflix series, She's Gotta Have It.

== Credits ==
=== Theatre ===
Year	Title	Role	Dates	Venue	Notes
2009	Under Fire	La Muchacha	September 30 – October 12, 2009	The Theater at St. Clements (NYMF)	Off-Broadway
2010	Chautauqua!	Ensemble	January 7–17, 2010	The Public Theater	Off-Broadway
2010	Quanah	Ensemble	January 19–24, 2010	Pace University's Schaeberle Studio Theater	Pace New Musicals
2010	The King and I	Anna Leonowens	August 2010	St. Gregory Theater Group	Regional
2010	13	Director	October 22–24, 2010	South Side Middle School	Rockville Centre Guild for the Arts
2011	Little Women	Jo March	October 21–23, 2011	South Side Middle School	Rockville Centre Guild for the Arts
2013	In The Heights	Nina Rosario	April 12–21, 2013	Montclair Operetta Club	Regional
2016	A Taste of Things to Come	Agnes Crookshank	January 30 – February 21, 2016	Bucks County Playhouse	
2016	Oliver!	Nancy	August 20–21, 2016	Warehouse Theater at the Fairfield Theatre Company	New Paradigm Theatre Company; regional
2017	Man of La Mancha	Aldonza/Dulcinea	May 25 – June 18, 2017	SaGaJi Theatre (Colorado Springs, CO)	Regional
2017	Little Shop of Horrors	Chiffon	September 19 – October 15, 2017	Fulton Theatre (Lancaster, PA)	Regional
2018	Monument	Lead	February 3–4, 2018	Times Center	Prospect Theatre Company
2018	Women on Fire: Stories from the Frontlines		May 11 – June 1, 2018	Royal Family Arts Space	Off-Broadway
2018	Fatty Fatty No Friends	Sally	August 1–4, 2018	The Green Room 42 (NYMF)	Off-Broadway
2018	The Hunchback of Notre Dame	Esmeralda	August 18–19, 2018	Warehouse Theater at Fairfield Theatre Company	New Paradigm Theatre Company
2018	The Hunchback of Notre Dame	Esmeralda	November 8 – December 30, 2018	Argyle Theatre (Babylon, NY)	Regional
2022	Rattlesnake Kate	Celia	February 4 – March 13, 2022	Denver Center for the Performing Arts	Regional

=== Television ===
Year	Title	Role	Notes
2016	Orange is the New Black	Singing Inmate No. 3	Episode 4.2: "Power Suit"
2019	She's Gotta Have It	Marisol	Post-production; recurring role
2021	FBI	NYPD Uniform	Episode 4.4: "Know Thyself"

=== Film ===
Year	Title	Role	Dates	Notes
2022	Triple Threat	Laura	June 21, 2022	

== Discography ==
=== EPs ===
List of EPs with selected album details
Title	Details
Me and You	Released: November 10, 2018 (US); Label: Independent; Formats: CD, Digital download

List of EPs with selected album details
Title	Details
Ginita	Released: August 5, 2022 (US); Label: Independent; Formats: Digital download

=== Singles ===
List of singles showing year released and album name
Title	Year	Album
"Everything to Me"	2014	You and Me
"Cupcakes"	2014	Non-album single
"Don't Forget Your Pet on Christmas"	2016	Non-album single
"Ugly Christmas Sweater Party"	2017	Non-album single
"Unwrap Your Heart"	2017	Non-album single
"White Christmas"	2018	Non-album single
"Piñata""Harvest" "Hidden Hurt" "Skyline" "Stick Around"	2018	Ginita
