= McGuinty =

McGuinty is a surname of Irish origin. Notable people with the surname include:

- Dalton McGuinty (born 1955), Canadian politician
- Dalton McGuinty Sr. (1926-1990), Canadian politician
- David McGuinty (born 1960), Canadian lawyer and politician

== See also ==
- McGinty
