= William Bradley Strickland =

1967 photograph of William Bradley Strickland during a rehearsal of one of his compositions.

William Bradley Strickland, also known as Willie Strickland, (August 21, 1929 – April 9, 1990) was an American composer, music educator, and music publisher. In his early career he worked as a public school music teacher for Hempstead Union Free School District and Rockville Centre Union Free School District. He later worked as a composer, orchestrator, and arranger for television and Broadway musicals, and also wrote band music repertoire used for education purposes. He was the founder of the music publishing house Consort Music. He ended his career teaching on the music faculties of Hofstra University and Adelphi University.

== Early life and education ==
William Bradley Strickland was born in Manhattan on August 21, 1929. He grew up in Floral Park, Queens and was educated in New York City Public Schools. While in high school he was instructed in the Schillinger System of Musical Composition by composer and conductor Rudolf Schramm (1902–1981). After high school, he studied under composer Elie Siegmeister at Hofstra University where he graduated with a Bachelor of Arts degree in music in 1952.

Following his undergraduate studies, Strickland joined the 25th Infantry Division of the United States Army where he served as a trumpeter in the infantry's band. He was discharged in 1953 at which time he began his career as a music teacher. In 1956 he pursued graduate studies in music composition at the Juilliard School where he was a pupil of Tibor Serly.

== Career ==
In the 1950s and 1960s Strickland worked as a public school music educator in New York state. He was director of the music department at Hempstead Union Free School District before serving in the same capacity for the Rockville Centre Union Free School District. He led marching bands at both institutions, and composed band music for education purposes. Some of his compositions included the concert marchs "Manhatta" and "Avante Garde" (1959, Bourne Co. Music Publishers), the trumpet solo "Azricarado" (published by Alfred Music), the Spanish march "Banderas" (published by Alfred Music), and concert band piece "Bold as Brass". His marching band in Rockville was particularly successful; winning several awards and appearing on national television broadcasts.

Strickland left teaching in the early 1970s to pursue a full time career as a composer. He contributed songs to the 1969 Broadway musical Comin' Uptown. He also wrote the scores to several industrial films, and worked as an orchestrator, arranger, and composer for television and Broadway musicals. His other commercial work included composing jingles for the Miller Brewing Company, Texaco, Texas Commerce Bank, Marine Midland Bank, and Ivory soap.

Strickland founded the music publishing house Consort Music. He wrote symphonic compositions which were performed in concerts by orchestras like the Vienna Symphony, The New Symphony Of Dublin, The Master Vurtuosi Of New York, and the Orchestra Da Camera. He returned to teaching in his later career; this time on the faculties of Hofstra University and Adelphi University.

Strickland died on April 9, 1990, in Southold, New York.
