= McGinty =

McGinty is a surname of Irish origin. Notable people with the surname include:

- Adam McGinty (born 1971), Australian cricketer
- Anne McGinty (born 1945), American flautist, composer and music publisher
- Billy McGinty (rugby league) (born 1964), Scottish rugby league player
- Billy McGinty (cowboy) (1871–1961), American cowboy
- Brian McGinty (born 1976), Scottish footballer
- Damian McGinty (born 1992), Irish actor and singer
- Derek McGinty (born 1959), American news anchor and television journalist
- Doris Evans McGinty (died 2005), American musicologist
- Garnie W. McGinty (1900–1984), American historian
- Ian McGinty (born 1985), American comics artist
- Jim McGinty (born 1949), Australian politician
- Joe McGinty, American keyboardist
- John J. McGinty III (born 1940), United States Marine Corps officer
- Kathleen McGinty, American environmentalist
- Laurie McGinty (1921–1991), Australian politician
- Mick McGinty (died 2021), American artist
- Sean McGinty (born 1993), English-Irish footballer
- Thom McGinty (1952–1995), Scottish-Irish actor and mime
- Thomas Joseph McGinty (1892 - 1970), American mobster

== In fiction ==
- In the Swallows and Amazons series by Arthur Ransome, McGinty is the name of a housekeeper who is the Glaswegian widow of an Irishman. Her surname is also lent as a pseudonym for a Scottish Gaelic family.
