= Kevin Connors =

American sportscaster

- Born: Rockville Centre, New York, U.S.
- Education: Ithaca College
- Occupation: Sportscaster
- Years active: 2008–present
- Employer(s): The Walt Disney Company including ABC and ESPN (2008–present)

Kevin Connors is an American sportscaster for ESPN and ABC. He is among the most versatile studio hosts in sports television, handling ESPN's coverage of college basketball and college football, as well as serving as the primary host for Baseball Tonight. He is also a regular anchor on SportsCenter. In addition, Connors has handled play-by-play duties for college basketball, college football, boxing and Major League Baseball broadcasts on ESPN. He is also a voice in the popular EA Sports video game "College Football 25." Connors was previously a sports reporter and sports anchor for WCBS-TV, the flagship station of CBS in New York City and WCBS (AM).

== Biography ==
Connors joined ESPN in 2008 after serving as the WCBS Newsradio 880 PM drive sports anchor for two and a half years. During his tenure at WCBS, Connors also became the weekend sports anchor for WCBS-TV (CBS 2). Previously, Connors spent eight years in television as the sports director/anchor at Regional News Network (RNN-TV). The New York State Broadcasters Association has honored Connors on four occasions. In 1999, 2003 and 2004 for "Outstanding Sportscast" and in 2001 for “Outstanding Documentary” on the ‘Our Town to Cooperstown’ series profiling seven members of the Baseball Hall of Fame from the tri-state region. Connors was also honored by the New York State Associated Press Broadcaster’s Association in 2003 for his feature reporting of Army football and nominated for a New York State Emmy Award in 2004 for his work on Army football.

A native of Rockville Centre, New York, Connors attended South Side High School where he was an All-Nassau County basketball player. A four-year letter winner on the Ithaca College men's basketball team, Connors graduated from Ithaca's Park School of Communications.

Connors is a Buffalo Bills, New York Yankees and Syracuse Orange fan.

He is married to former ice dancer and 2000 World Junior silver medallist Emilie Nussear.
