= Alta Cohen =

American baseball player (1908–2003)

- Outfielder
- Born: December 25, 1908; Brooklyn, New York, U.S.
- Died: March 11, 2003 (aged 94); Maplewood, New Jersey, U.S.
- Batted: Left Threw: Left

MLB debut
- April 15, 1931, for the Brooklyn Robins

Last MLB appearance
- June 17, 1933, for the Philadelphia Phillies

MLB statistics
- Batting average: .194
- Home runs: 0
- Runs batted in: 2
- Stats at Baseball Reference

Teams
- Brooklyn Robins/Dodgers (1931–1932); Philadelphia Phillies (1933)

Albert Cohen (December 25, 1908 – March 11, 2003), nicknamed "Alta", was an American professional baseball player. He attended South Side High School in New York. He was Jewish.

In the minor leagues, he was an All Star with the Triple A Toledo Mud Hens.

In 1931 he batted .316–5–47 for the Hartford Senators, and led the league in walks (87). Cohen made hid major league debut in the second game of the 1931 season, taking over for pinch hitter Ike Boone.

The next day, Cohen was farmed out to Hartford. Cohen was leading the Eastern League in hitting in 1932 with a .409 average in 59 games when the league folded in mid-season. He became a pitcher and had two good years with Toledo (American Association) in 1936–37 with a 29–19 record. He played outfield in the majors from 1931 to 1933 with the Brooklyn Robins/Dodgers and Cincinnati Reds.

Cohen's father gave him the name Alta (Yiddish for "old") as the traditional Jewish trick to fool the angel of death during the 1918 flu epidemic. In the majors, Alta's teammates called him "Schoolboy."

Cohen founded the Altco Products Co. in 1940, with offices throughout the state, and served as president for 44 years before retiring in 1984. He was a member of the board of directors of the Newark Beth Israel Medical Center and the Daughters of Israel Geriatric Center in West Orange, and a member of the Green Brook Country Club in North Caldwell. Also a philanthropist, he was honored in the 1980s by Hebrew University, in New York City.

He lived in Verona and South Orange before moving to Maplewood, New Jersey, where he died in his home.
