= South Side High School (Rockville Centre, New York) =

Location
- 140 Shepard St; Rockville Centre, New York 11570; United States; 40°40′3″N 73°37′14″W

Information
- Type: Public
- Established: 1892
- School district: Rockville Centre Union Free School District
- NCES School ID: 362478003431
- Principal: John Murphy
- Teaching staff: 96.79 (on an FTE basis)
- Grades: 9-12
- Enrollment: 985 (2023-2024)
- Student to teacher ratio: 10.18
- Campus: Suburban: Large
- Colors: Blue and Red
- Mascot: Sammy Cyclone
- Team name: Cyclones
- Newspaper: The Sportsman
- Yearbook: The Colonnade
- Website: sshs.rvcschools.org

South Side High School is the only public high school in the village of Rockville Centre, New York. South Side, a part of the Rockville Centre School District, serves grades 9 through 12 and boasts a variety of academic, extra-curricular and athletic programs, including the International Baccalaureate (IB) Curriculum in junior and senior years. School district boundaries can be found in Rockville Centre and South Hempstead. In 2008 South Side was ranked No. 47 in the top 100 high schools in the nation by Newsweek's "The Top of the Class: The complete list of the top 1,300 top U.S. high schools". South Side has maintained this distinction, at No. 65 in 2003, No. 45 in 2005, No. 32 in 2006 and No. 44 in 2007.

The primary address for South Side is 140 Shepherd Street, Rockville Centre, New York 11570. Located further south in Rockville Centre is the "Greenhouse". Established in 1975, the purpose of this off-site school is to provide a different approach to teaching students with academic or personal troubles as well as different scheduling and academic programs. The main building has two floors.

There is also a middle school called South Side Middle School. As of the 2014–15 school year, the school had an enrollment of 1,092 students and 93.7 classroom teachers (on an FTE basis), for a student–teacher ratio of 11.6:1. There were 109 students (10.0% of enrollment) eligible for free lunch and 28 (2.6% of students) eligible for reduced-cost lunch.

== School history ==
The school's name reflects its status as the first high school on Long Island's south shore, east of Jamaica. It has retained that name though most of Long Island's incorporated villages have established high schools named for their village.

The Shepherd Street address is the third location for the school, its first site (1892–1923) was on College Place, now the Municipal Building of Rockville Centre. Its second site (1924–1954) on Hillside Avenue is now South Side Middle School. The school has served grades 9–12 since 1982–83, having previously been a 10–12 institution with the freshman attending what was then South Side Junior High School along with the seventh- and eighth-graders. The switch occurred as the district's sixth-graders moved to the Junior High, with that institution becoming the Middle School of RVC.

The most prominent architectural characteristic of the current building is the colonnade adorning the entrance on the west side of the building. This feature gives its name to the school's annual yearbook, The Colonnade, but is unusual in that it is not associated with either of the school's grand entrances to the north and the south, which face the parking lots and athletic fields.

== Facilities ==
The school district headquarters, the William H. Johnson Administration Building, is on the high school campus; it was given its current name in 2020.

== Sports ==
=== Red and Blue ===
Red and Blue is an annual competition held by South Side High School since 1916. "Red and Blue started when girls weren't allowed to participate in team sports." Author and historian Doris Kearns Goodwin wrote extensively about Red and Blue in her autobiographical memoir "Wait Till Next Year." Since 1979 Title IX has mandated that girls have equivalent access to sports and other activities, but the tradition has lived on, with approximately 300 (mostly) female students participating each year. In recent years, the event has also raised money to benefit Breast Cancer research and support. Additionally, talks about removing or opening this competition to all genders have been a topic of heavy debate in recent years.

== Notable alumni ==
The following notable people graduated from South Side High School:

- Whittaker Chambers, writer, editor, Communist party member, and spy for the Soviet Union who defected and became an outspoken opponent of communism, 1919
- Alta Cohen, Major League Baseball player, 1926
- Tim Holland, backgammon world champion, author, teacher, professional gambler, 1948
- Mel Gussow, theater critic for the New York Times, 1951
- Martin Feldstein, economist, economic adviser to President Ronald Reagan, 1957
- Susan Fromberg Schaeffer, novelist ("Anya," "The Madness of a Seduced Woman," etc.), 1957
- Doris Kearns Goodwin, Pulitzer Prize-winning historian, author ("Team of Rivals", "Wait Till Next Year," etc.), 1960
- Dean Skelos, New York State Senator, Majority Leader of the NYS Senate, 1966
- Dean Kamen, inventor, entrepreneur, 1969
- Deborah Kass, artist, Board of Directors member for the Andy Warhol Foundation for the Visual Arts, 1970
- Dan Mishkin, writer; co-creator of Amethyst and Blue Devil for DC Comics, 1970
- Karen Klonsky, noted agricultural economist, 1970
- Howard Stern, radio personality, 1972
- Anthony Drazan, screenwriter, film director, and actor, 1973
- Donald Holder, Broadway light designer, 1976
- Ted Demme, film producer, director, 1981
- Dave Attell, comedian, writer, actor, 1983
- Kim Conway Haley, soccer player, 1990
- Max von Essen, Tony Award-nominated Broadway actor, 1992
- Kevin Connors, sportscaster, 1993
- June Diane Raphael, actress, 1998
- Danielle Tumminio Hansen, writer, theologian, Episcopal priest, and life coach, 1999
- Mark O'Connell, drummer for rock band Taking Back Sunday, 1999
- Amy Schumer, comedian and actor, 1999
- Laura Stevenson, musician and songwriter, 2002
- Des Rocs, Danny Rocco, American rock musician, 2006
- Gina Naomi Baez, actress, 2006
- Crystal Dunn, U.S. Women's National Team soccer player, 2010
