= Susan Fromberg Schaeffer =

American writer and academic (1940–2011)

- Born: Susan Fromberg; March 25, 1940; Brooklyn, New York, U.S.
- Died: August 26, 2011 (aged 71); Chicago, Illinois, U.S.
- Education: South Side High School; University of Chicago (B.A., 1961; M.A., 1963; Ph.D., 1966)
- Occupations: Novelist, poet and academic
- Organizations: Brooklyn College
- Notable work: Granite Lady (1974); The Madness of a Seduced Woman (1984); Buffalo Afternoon (1989)
- Spouse: Neil J. Schaeffer

Susan Fromberg Schaeffer (March 25, 1940 – August 26, 2011) was an American novelist and poet who was a Professor of English at Brooklyn College for more than thirty years. She won numerous national writing awards and contributed book reviews for The New York Times.

== Education and family ==
The daughter of wholesale clothier Irving and Edith (née Levine) Fromberg, Susan Fromberg was born in Brooklyn, New York, and graduated from Long Island's South Side High School in 1957. In the Fall, she enrolled at the University of Chicago, where she earned her bachelor's degree in 1961, her master's in 1963, and her doctorate in 1966. The subject of her dissertation was a study of themes in the writings of Vladimir Nabokov, in whom she found "the most intellectual novelist to write in English since James Joyce".

After returning to New York City, she married a fellow English Professor, Neil Jerome Schaeffer (a Columbia University graduate, Chairman of the English Department at Brooklyn College, and a noted scholarly author in his own right) in 1970; they adopted two children: Benjamin (born 1973), and May (born 1977).

== Publications ==
As of 2007, her published work included 14 novels, a collection of short stories plus others, six volumes of poetry and two children's books. She contributed frequently to the New York Times Book Review and had a number of scholarly articles on writing published in journals. Her project "Memories Like Splintered Glass" was her first memoir.

Her second novel, Anya (1974), was based mainly on the biography of Anya Savikin Brodman, to whom Schaeffer gave only passing credit until an accommodation was reached after acrimonious public encounters between the author and her subject.

The New York Times commented on Schaeffer's "gift for evoking complex characters in the grip of extreme psychological stress and physical suffering, notably in 'The Madness of a Seduced Woman' and the Vietnam War novel 'Buffalo Afternoon'". As a poet, she was a finalist for the 1975 National Book Award for Poetry for her collection Granite Lady, she won the O. Henry Award for short fiction three times (in 1978, 1997 and 2006).

=== Novels ===
- Falling, New York: Macmillan, 1973.
- Anya, New York: Macmillan, 1974.
- Time in Its Flight, New York: Doubleday, 1978.
- Love, New York: Dutton, 1981.
- First Nights, New York: Knopf, 1983.
- The Madness of a Seduced Woman, New York: Dutton, 1984.
- Mainland, New York: Simon and Schuster, 1985.
- The Injured Party, New York: St. Martin's Press, 1986.
- Buffalo Afternoon, New York: Knopf, 1989.
- Green Island, Penguin Books, 1994.
- The Golden Rope, New York: Knopf, 1996.
- The Autobiography of Foudini M. Cat, New York: Knopf, 1997.
- The Snow Fox, W.W. Norton, 2004.
- Poison, W.W. Norton, 2006.

=== Short stories ===
- The Queen of Egypt, New York: Dutton, 1980.
- "In the Hospital and Elsewhere", in Prairie Schooner (Lincoln, Nebraska), Winter 1981–82.
- "Virginia; or, A Single Girl", in Prairie Schooner (Lincoln, Nebraska), Fall 1983.

=== Poetry ===
- The Witch and the Weather Report, New York: Seven Woods Press, 1972.
- Granite Lady, New York: Macmillan, 1974.
- The Rhymes and Runes of the Toad, New York: Macmillan, 1975.
- Alphabet for the Lost Years, San Francisco: Gallimaufry, 1976.
- The Red, White, and Blue Poem, Denver: The Ally, 1977.
- The Bible of the Beasts of the Little Field: Poems, New York: Dutton, 1980.

=== Children's books ===
- The Dragons of North Chittendon, New York: Simon and Schuster, 1986.
- The Four Hoods and Great Dog, New York: St. Martin's Press, 1988.

== Career and personal life ==
After earning her master's degree and while working on her Ph.D., Fromberg instructed English at Wright Junior College in Chicago. She then began teaching at the Illinois Institute of Technology and became an assistant professor of English after receiving her doctorate. She moved back to New York City in 1967 as an assistant professor at Brooklyn College, where her future husband was a colleague in the English department (among her students was Ramona Lofton, a poet whom she encouraged to write a novel, Push being published in 1996 under Lofton's pen name "Sapphire").

Eventually, Push was adapted for the screen and Directed by Lee Daniels and was released as the film "Precious" in 2009 and was produced by Tyler Perry & Oprah Winfrey. It starred Mo'Nique and Mariah Carey & introduced Gabourey Sidibe to film audiences in her screen debut as the titular character Claireece "Precious" Jones. Mo'Nique won a Best Supporting Actress Oscar for her performance as Precious' mother, and Sidibe was nominated for a Best Actress Oscar at the 2010 Oscars. Fromberg became an associate professor in 1972, then professor of English in 1974. In 1985, she was named Broeklundian Professor at Brooklyn College.

She retired from Brooklyn College in 1997. After retirement, she and her husband Neil, lived at their second home in Vermont full-time until 2002. In 2002, they returned to Chicago, living there temporarily until they sold their Brooklyn property and moved to Chicago permanently in 2004.

Schaeffer was a visiting professor at her alma mater, the University of Chicago from 2002 to 2009, teaching fiction and creative writing before illness forced her to stop teaching in March 2009. After a long illness, she died on August 26, 2011, of complications following a stroke, and was survived by Neil, Benjamin and May. Neil died in November 2014.

== Honors ==
- Granite Lady was nominated for a National Book Award for Poetry in 1974.
- Wallant award for Anya: 1974
- O. Henry Award: 1978, 1997, 2006
- St. Lawrence Book Award: 1984
- Guggenheim Fellowship: 1984
- Centennial Review Award for poetry: 1985
- The University of Chicago Alumni Association awarded her their Professional Achievement Citation in 1996
