= Danielle Tumminio Hansen =

American theologian (born 1981)

The Rev. Dr. Danielle Elizabeth Tumminio Hansen
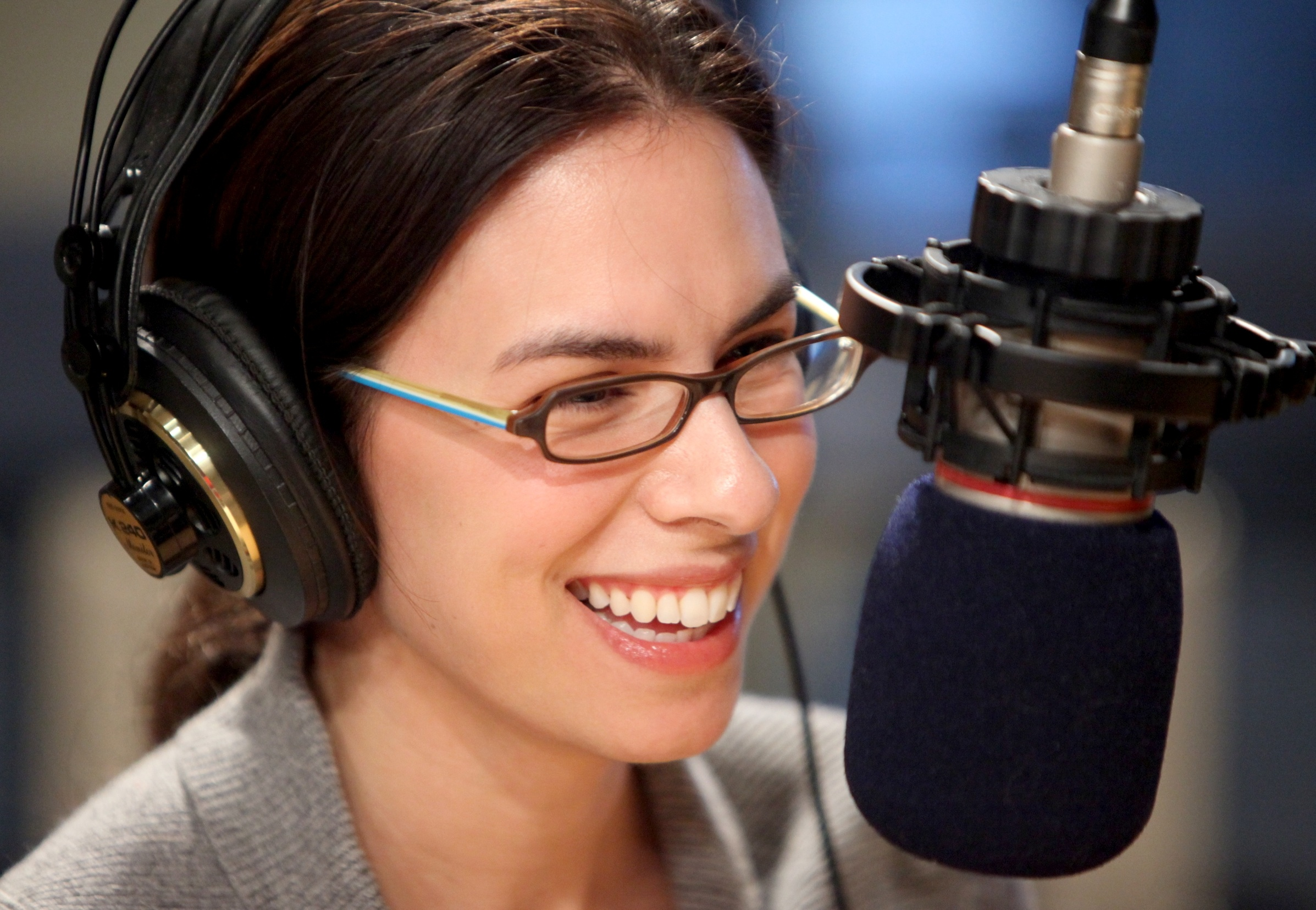
- Tumminio Hansen speaking on The Colin McEnroe Show in 2010
- Born: 1981 (age 44–45); New York City, New York, US
- Other name: Danielle Tumminio
- Spouse: Eric Hansen (m. 2010)

Ecclesiastical career
- Religion: Christianity (Anglican)
- Church: Episcopal Church (United States)

Academic background
- Education: Yale University; Boston University
- Doctoral advisor: Shelly Rambo
- Other advisor: Marilyn McCord Adams

Academic work
- Discipline: Theology
- Sub-discipline: Practical theology
- Institutions: Emory University
- Main interests: surrogacy, reproductive loss, infertility, sexual violence, gender-based violence, epistemology
- Notable works: Conceiving Family, God and Harry Potter at Yale

The Rev. Dr. Danielle Elizabeth Tumminio Hansen (born 1981) is a writer, intellectual, practical theologian, and Episcopal priest whose expertise is in the intersection of spirituality and cultural life. She is currently a professor in practical and pastoral theology at Emory University in Atlanta, Georgia.

== Early life and education ==
Born in Manhattan to two school teachers, Tumminio Hansen grew up in Rockville Centre, Long Island, and attended South Side High School. She was raised in the Episcopal Church and sang in the girls' choir at the Cathedral of the Incarnation in Garden City, which she credits for giving her extensive biblical, theological, and musical training at an early age.

She also sang during her college and graduate school years with the choir of Christ Church in New Haven, Connecticut, and was a member of the Yale Glee Club. She credits music as a powerful force in her spiritual life.

Tumminio Hansen is a three-time graduate of Yale University, where she studied with prominent theologians Marilyn McCord Adams, Emilie Townes, Miroslav Volf, and Serene Jones. She also spent summers at St Andrew's University in Scotland and Hebrew University of Jerusalem in Israel. She pursued doctoral studies at Boston University, beginning in 2008 under the direction of Shelly Rambo and Bryan Stone, where she researched trauma, feminist theology, reproduction, and restorative justice. At Boston University, she studied with Elie Wiesel.

== Career ==
=== Episcopal Church ===
In 2010 Tumminio Hansen was ordained as a priest in the Episcopal Diocese of Connecticut and served in associate roles at churches in Massachusetts, namely Christ Church, Quincy, St Anne's-in-the-Fields, Lincoln, and the Church of Our Redeemer, Lexington. She was also a chaplain at Yale New Haven Hospital in Connecticut and Groton School in Massachusetts.

=== Academia ===
Tumminio Hansen taught courses at Yale University, Tufts University, the University of New Haven, and Central Connecticut State University, before being appointed assistant professor of pastoral theology at the Seminary of the Southwest in Austin, Texas, in 2016. In 2022 she became assistant professor of practical theology and spiritual care at the Candler School of Theology at Emory University in Atlanta, Georgia.

== Research interests ==
=== Trauma ===
In August 2024, Tumminio Hansen published Trauma-Informed Spiritual Care: Interventions for Safety, Meaning, Reconnection, and Justice. The textbook applies Judith Herman's three stages of healing along with Tumminio Hansen's training as a restorative justice practitioner to offer spiritual care providers a set of tools for understanding and responding to trauma.

=== Sexual violations ===
Tumminio Hansen uses her own experience of rape and her subsequent inability to acknowledge the wrong to propel the overall argument in Speaking of Rape that the terms most commonly used for sexual violations—including “rape” and “sexual assault”—fail to represent the scope of sexual harm. She identifies gaps posed by the most commonly used words and offers an alternative definition of rape as, "Acts of power, using sex, that violate agency, body, and desire."

She proposes in both Speaking of Rape and “Absent a Word” that the linguistic gaps in matters of sexual violations instantiate concrete harm to victims.

In “Remembering Rape in Heaven,” Tumminio Hansen argues against Miroslav Volf’s proposal that trauma must be forgotten in the eschaton. She suggests that such a proposal raises serious concerns concerning victim epistemic credibility, divine beneficence, and the purpose of remembering the biblical corpus. Harkening to the work of Marilyn McCord Adams, Tumminio Hansen concludes that it is possible to hold an eschatological vision that preserves victim memory.

=== Surrogacy, reproductive loss, infertility, and family ===
Tumminio Hansen published the first comprehensive practical theology of infertility, reproductive loss, and surrogacy in 2019. Conceiving Family is an interdisciplinary study that utilizes ethnographic, feminist, womanist, philosophical and practical theological sources to argue for a vision of family defined by relationships and not biology. Tumminio Hansen proposes that surrogacy should be a mutual decision made between surrogate and intended family that supports the identity construction of each party and any resulting children. The conclusion of that book expands this model of reproductive surrogacy to non-reproductive realms in which individuals function as surrogates (proxies) for one another.

=== Christianity and Harry Potter ===
Tumminio Hansen is the author of God and Harry Potter at Yale: Teaching Faith and Fantasy Fiction in an Ivy League Classroom and was the instructor of the "Christian Theology and Harry Potter" seminar at Yale University from the spring of 2008 until 2013. She also repeated the course several times at Tufts University. Tumminio Hansen has also presented material on the intersection between theology and the Harry Potter series at the Infinitus Symposium in Orlando, Florida in 2010, the Portus Symposium in Dallas, Texas, in the summer of 2008, and she chaired the panel on Harry Potter and Religion at the 2008 American Academy of Religion conference. Her teaching has been praised by Harry Potter commentator John Granger on his Hogwarts Professor website.

Tumminio Hansen stands in opposition to those in Christian circles who call the Harry Potter series heretical based upon the characters' use of witchcraft. She has said that in order to consider whether they truly are heretical, Christians must analyze whether the writings of J. K. Rowling violate a number of core theological doctrines, including sin, evil, sacrifice, and grace. In 2008, she offered an innovative seminar at Yale in order to offer students an opportunity for sustained discussion about the status of the series. Over 90 students sought to enroll, and the course quickly gained international attention from media sources including CNN; in subsequent years, it became one of the university's most popular seminar offerings and inspired other courses across the country. She later used that sustained discussion as the basis for her first book, God and Harry Potter at Yale: Teaching Faith and Fantasy Fiction in an Ivy League Classroom. She has maintained that the books are not heretical and are in fact powerful tools for teaching theology to curious academics, seekers, and faithful Christians.

== Publications ==
Tumminio Hansen is the author of several works of practical theology, including Trauma-Informed Spiritual Care, Speaking of Rape, Conceiving Family: A Practical Theology of Surrogacy and Self, (2013) and God and Harry Potter at Yale: Teaching Faith and Fantasy Fiction in an Ivy League Classroom (2010).

She has also authored numerous editorials and feature articles on the intersection of spirituality and culture as well as on contemporary issues in the lives of women and mothers. Her work has appeared in publications including The New York Times, CNN's Belief Blog, The Guardian, and The Christian Century,.

She was a regular blogger on issues in contemporary spirituality for Huffington Post, and a regular contributor to Felicity Huffman's What The Flicka website, where she wrote about spirituality in the lives of women and mothers prior to its removal during the College Admissions Scandal.

== Appearances ==
Tumminio Hansen has been interviewed by numerous national and international media outlets. Her take on Christianity's role in the Harry Potter series has been featured on televised broadcasts including CNN, Today Show Australia, and the national Canadian news talk show Connect with Mark Kelley. She has also appeared in radio broadcasts, including the Colin McEnroe Show and the nationally syndicated Bob and Sheri Show. Her interviews have been featured in print publications including Christianity Today, and Ministry Values.

She has also appeared several times on the television show "Sister Wives," and her article about visiting a Mormon temple went viral. in the Mormon community.

== Personal life ==
Tumminio married Eric Hansen at the Church of the Incarnation in New York City in 2010, at a service performed by the Rt. Rev. Laura J. Ahrens, suffragan bishop of Connecticut.

== Bibliography ==
- God and Harry Potter at Yale: Teaching Faith and Fantasy Fiction in an Ivy League Classroom (Unlocking Press, 2010) ISBN 9780982963319
- (editor) When Two or Three Are Gathered: Spiritual Stories by Contemporary Episcopalians (Forward Movement, 2013) ISBN 9780880283649
- Expecting Jesus (Morehouse, 2014) ISBN 9780880283878
- Conceiving Family: A Practical Theology of Surrogacy and Self (Baylor University Press, 2019) ISBN 9781481310567
- Trauma-Informed Spiritual Care: Interventions for Safety, Meaning, Reconnection, and Justice (Fortress Press, 2024) ISBN 9781506485836
