= Tinkerbelle the Dog =

Canine model

Tinkerbelle and Belle
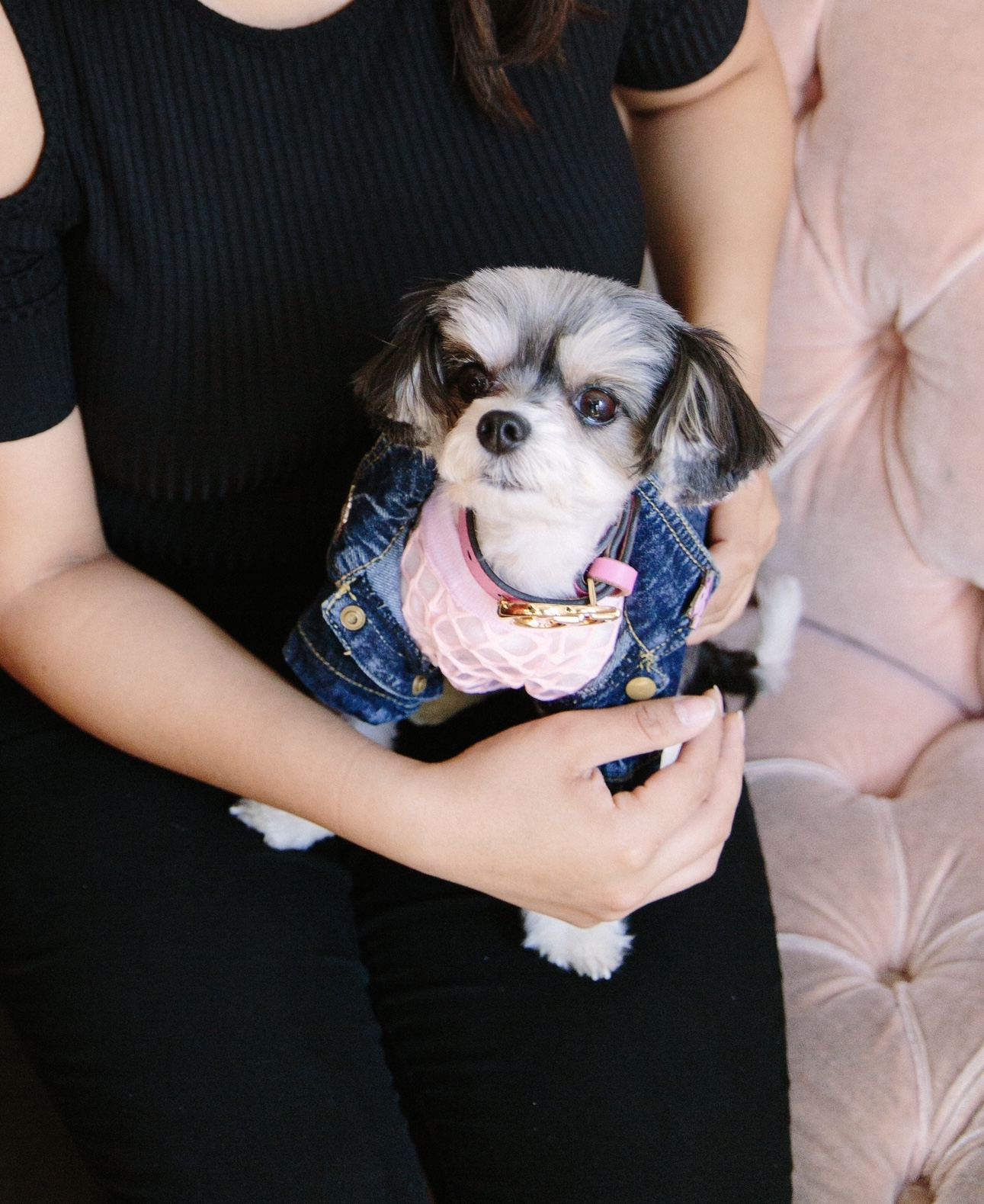
- Other name: Tinkerbelle the dog
- Species: Canis lupus familiaris
- Breed: A Papitese, which is a crossbreed of the (Papillon & Maltese)
- Owner: Sam Carrell
- Official website

Tinkerbelle (sometimes referred to as Tinkerbelle the dog) is a canine model and internet celebrity. She was listed as one of the Most Entrepreneurial Dogs in America by Entrepreneur and is considered a social media influencer with more than 400,000 followers on Instagram.

Tinkerbelle was rescued from a shelter by Sam Carrell in 2012. Carrell was at the shelter visiting a friend, but was told Tinkerbelle would not socialize, eat, or come to anyone. Carrell adopted her and took her everywhere she went in order to socialize her, eventually meeting an agent while on a walk in New York City.

Tinkerbelle debuted as a dog model in a Ralph Lauren collection. She has since modeled for brands that include American Eagle, Burt's Bees, and Converse. Additional appearances include playing Chowsie, Rose's dog, in a production of Gypsy, and in promos for the movie A Dog's Purpose. She is also a regular at New York Fashion Week. She and her owner Sam Carrell have appeared with celebrities such as Latto, Camila Cabello, 5 Seconds of Summer, and Ryan Seacrest. Her social media accounts document her travels across the United States. She has appeared at red carpet events such as Wango Tango, and being seen on talk shows like Access Daily.

Joined in 2021 by her adopted baby sister Belle The Dog (AKA Belle), the duo has booked modeling jobs together and individually. Belle has been cast on Saturday Night live three times.

== See also ==
- Boo
- Manny the Frenchie
- Tuna
- List of individual dogs
