= Anne McGinty =

American conductor and composer

Anne McGinty (born June 29, 1945, in Findlay, Ohio) is an American flutist, composer and music publisher.

== Biography ==
McGinty writes for bands of all levels, including elementary and middle school bands. She has written compositions and arrangements for concert band, string orchestra, flute, and flute ensembles. In 1987, McGinty and her husband, John Edmondson, formed Queenwood Publications. They managed the creation, production, promotion, and international sales and distribution of the catalog. In March 2002, they sold their company to the Neil A. Kjos Music Company. McGinty later opened her own publishing company, McGinty Music. McGinty is a member of the American Society of Composers and a member of the National Flute Association, where she served for two years on the board of directors.

== Education ==
McGinty started her education at Ohio State University. At OSU, Donald McGinnis was McGinty's mentor, band director, and flute teacher. She left OSU to pursue her career in flute performance. During her time off, McGinty played the flute with the Tucson Symphony Orchestra. She later returned to Duquesne University to receive her Bachelor of Music, and Master of Music. At Duquesne, McGinty focused on flute performance, music theory and her compositions. There, she also studied flute and chamber music with Bernard Goldberg, and composition with Joseph Willcox Jenkins.

== Compositions ==
=== Pieces for Orchestra ===
- Dances In The Wind
- Choral Prelude
- Emerald Point Overture
- Painted Desert
- Japanese Folk Trilogy

=== Pieces for Band ===
- Bandtasia
- Amberwood Overture
- Athenian Festival
- Atlantica
- Discovery Overture
- Pinnacle Overture
- Prometheus Overture
- Somerset Overture
- Actium
- Testimonium
- Sea Song Trilogy
- The Red Balloon
- Debussy: sarabande
- Painted Desert
- Arlington Overture
- Queenwood Overture
- Atlantis
- Emily (The Ghost)
- Chorale and Canon
- Prelude to Festival
- Legend of the Eagle
- Prelude and Dance
- Clouds
- Windsor Overture
- African Folk Trilogy
- Triton
- African Folk Trilogy #2
- Echoes
- Flute Loops

== Achievements ==
- Received the Outstanding Service to Music Award from Tau Beta Sigma (national band sorority).
- Received the Golden Rose Award from the Women Band Directors National Association.
- McGinty was the first female composer to be authorized to write for the United States Army Band.
