= Rockville Centre Union Free School District =

School district in New York, United States

Rockville Centre Union Free School District is a school district headquartered in the William H. Johnson Administration Building on the campus of South Side High School in Rockville Centre, New York.

== History ==
William H. Johnson began working for the district circa 1980, and he began his term as superintendent circa 1986. Johnson retired in 2020; accordingly the administration building gained its current name, derived from Johnson, in 2020.

== Schools ==
Secondary schools

- South Side High School
- South Side Middle School

Elementary schools

- Covert Elementary School
- Hewitt Elementary School
- Riverside Elementary School
- Watson Elementary School
- Wilson Elementary School
