= Howard E. Akers =

American composer

Howard Estabrook Akers (July 17, 1913 – October 1, 1984) was a composer, conductor, teacher, and trombonist closely associated with college bands and theater orchestras. He published over 110 compositions for band, orchestra, chorus, and other ensembles under his own name and under the pseudonym Archie Masters. After serving as a Marine in World War II, he taught at several colleges and high schools in Illinois, New York, California, and Washington. He was an editor for Carl Fischer Music from 1955 to 1963 and served as a conductor for the Hollywood Bowl Orchestra.

Akers was born on July 17, 1913, in Laddonia, Missouri. He died on October 1, 1984, in Seattle, Washington, at the age of 71.
