= Rockville Centre, New York =

Village in New York, United States

Rockville Centre
- Village
- Incorporated Village of Rockville Centre
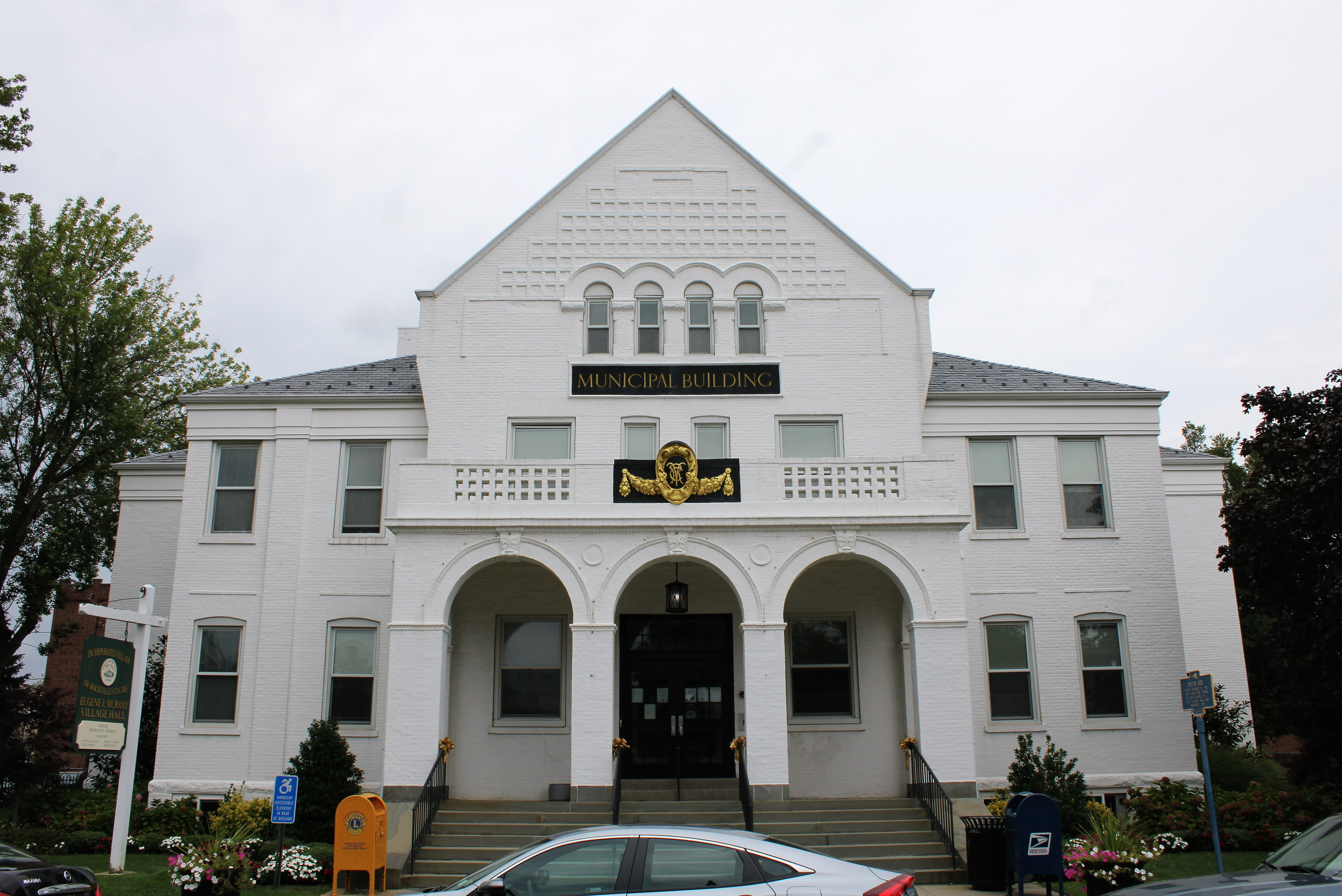
- Rockville Centre's Eugene J. Murray Village Hall in September 2021.
- Nickname: RVC
- Location in Nassau County and the state of New York.

- Location on Long Island Location within the state of New York
- Coordinates: 40°39′48″N 73°38′13″W
- Country: United States
- State: New York
- County: Nassau
- Town: Hempstead
- Incorporated: July 15, 1893

Government
  - Mayor: Francis X. Murray

Area
  - Total: 3.34 sq mi (8.64 km^{2})
  - Land: 3.25 sq mi (8.42 km^{2})
  - Water: 0.085 sq mi (0.22 km^{2})
- Elevation: 30 ft (9 m)

Population (2020)
  - Total: 26,016
  - Density: 8,002.8/sq mi (3,089.88/km^{2})
- Time zone: UTC-5 (EST)
  - Summer (DST): UTC-4 (EDT)
- ZIP codes: 11570
- Area codes: 516, 363
- FIPS code: 36-63264
- GNIS feature ID: 2391098
- Website: www.rvcny.gov

Rockville Centre, commonly abbreviated as RVC, is an incorporated village located in the Town of Hempstead in Nassau County, on the South Shore of Long Island, in New York, United States. The population was 26,016 at the time of the 2020 census.

== History ==
The site of Rockville Centre has been occupied by humans for thousands of years. Generally speaking, the people of the prehistoric Woodlands period East River culture are believed to have been the Algonkian-speaking ancestors of the historical Indian tribes of western Long Island. The historical territory of their Lenape descendants, the Canarsie, Recouwacky (Rockaway), Matinecock and Massapequa, included present-day western Long Island's Queens and Nassau Counties.

By the year 1643, there were roughly thirteen Algonquin bands (then referred to as tribes) living east of the Dutch-English settlements: the four or so Lenape chieftaincies in western Long Island, and descendants of the prehistoric Woodlands period Windsor culture living on eastern Long Island, considered by some to be branches of the Pequot: Merrick, Nissequoge, Secatoag, Seatauket, Patchoag, Poosepatuck (also called Uncachogee), Corchaug, Shinnecock, Manhansett (also called Manhasset), and Montaukett.

Imported diseases had decimated the natives in 16th century. While disease was still a major factor during the decades of the 17th century, native mortality in western Long Island due to disease was similar to that of the settlers. Most Lenape were pushed out of their homeland by expanding European colonies; the colonies received many immigrants while the Munsee-speaking Indian communities did not. Their dire situation was exacerbated by losses from intertribal conflicts.

The Reckouakie tribe (the Reckonhacky chieftaincy) had left their original land in present-day Rockaway and its surroundings in Queens County to Dutch Governor Kieft in 1640 because he wanted it for better defense of New Netherland. Most settled to the east in what was to become Rockville Centre on the traditional land of the Matinecock (or of the Massapequa), with whom they had ties of kinship. Dutch and English settlers declared the 1639 treaty meant no Indians would remain in western Long Island (so they could sell it to immigrants), in contrast to the exact terms of the treaty which meant the Native Americans were willing to share the usufruct of unoccupied land, with the Dutch leadership having eminent domain superior to their sachem's eminent domain. This led to many conflicts, then four years of open warfare. The Reckonhacky / Rockaway were party to a peace treaty dated May 24, 1645, following the devastation of Indian communities by Dutch soldiers. Violent expropriation dislocated them with the arrival of additional Dutch and English settlers.

The hamlet was named "Rockville Centre" in 1849, after local Methodist preacher and community leader Mordecai "Rock" Smith. It was incorporated as a village in 1893. Rockville Centre emerged in the late nineteenth and early twentieth century as a commuter town connected to New York by the Long Island Rail Road (LIRR). In 1915, the New York Tribune went so far as to declare that Rockville Centre was a place in which "the average mortal could live happily."

Like many Long Island communities at the time, Rockville Centre's population included a considerable number of supporters of the Ku Klux Klan during the 1920s. When the white supremacist organization placed a wreath at the town's memorial to its war dead in 1923, the American Legion removed it in protest, but the village police received so many calls of complaint in response that they were forced to replace the wreath. In the late 1960s, the village of Rockville Centre received a stinging rebuke for its failure to maintain public housing units primarily inhabited by African-Americans. A report from Nassau County's Human Rights Commission stated Rockville Centre was "at best indifferent to, if not actually in favor of, Negro removal." Martin Luther King Jr. visited Rockville Centre in 1968, where he addressed a large audience at South Side Junior High School on March 26, 1968.

In the early 1940s, Rockville Centre annexed the Mercy Medical Center property; the annexation saw the village's total area expand by 87 acres (35 ha).

On February 17, 1950, two LIRR trains collided near Rockville Centre station, killing 32 and injuring more than 80.

The Rockville Centre Post Office was listed on the National Register of Historic Places in 1989.

== Demographics ==
Historical population
Census	Pop.	Note	%±
1880	1,882		—
1900	1,884		—
1910	3,667		94.6%
1920	8,262		125.3%
1930	13,718		66.0%
1940	18,613		35.7%
1950	22,362		20.1%
1960	26,355		17.9%
1970	27,444		4.1%
1980	25,412		−7.4%
1990	24,727		−2.7%
2000	24,568		−0.6%
2010	24,023		−2.2%
2020	26,016		8.3%
U.S. Decennial Census

=== 2020 census ===
As of the 2020 census, Rockville Centre had a population of 26,016. The median age was 42.4 years. 21.9% of residents were under the age of 18 and 20.0% of residents were 65 years of age or older. For every 100 females there were 90.5 males, and for every 100 females age 18 and over there were 85.8 males age 18 and over.

100.0% of residents lived in urban areas, while 0.0% lived in rural areas.

There were 9,669 households in Rockville Centre, of which 31.2% had children under the age of 18 living in them. Of all households, 55.5% were married-couple households, 13.1% were households with a male householder and no spouse or partner present, and 27.7% were households with a female householder and no spouse or partner present. About 27.7% of all households were made up of individuals and 14.1% had someone living alone who was 65 years of age or older.

There were 9,991 housing units, of which 3.2% were vacant. The homeowner vacancy rate was 0.9% and the rental vacancy rate was 3.3%.

Racial composition as of the 2020 census
Race	Number	Percent
White	20,949	80.5%
Black or African American	1,382	5.3%
American Indian and Alaska Native	26	0.1%
Asian	629	2.4%
Native Hawaiian and Other Pacific Islander	1	0.0%
Some other race	1,105	4.2%
Two or more races	1,924	7.4%
Hispanic or Latino (of any race)	3,029	11.6%

=== 2010 census ===
At the time of the census of 2010, there were 24,111 people living in the village, 9,201 households and 6,468 families. The population density was 7,496.5 inhabitants per square mile (2,894.4/km^{2}). There were 9,419 housing units at an average density of 2,874.0 per square mile (1,109.7/km^{2}) as of 2010. The racial makeup of the village was 78.3% White, 8.6% Black or African American, 9.7% Hispanic or Latino, 0.1% American Indian and Alaska Native, 2.0% Asian alone, 0.0% Native Hawaiian and Other Pacific Islander, 0.1% Some Other Race, and 1.2% Two or More Races.

There were 10,002 households, of which 32.0% had children under the age of 18 living with them, 56.1% were married couples living together, 9.8% had a female householder with no husband present, and 31.3% were non-families. 27.5% of all households were made up of individuals, and 32.7% had someone living alone who was 65 years of age or older. The average household size was 2.64 and the average family size was 3.28. The population was spread out, with 25.8% under the age of 18, 5.8% from 18 to 24, 26.2% from 25 to 44, 25.9% from 45 to 64, and 16.3% who were 65 years of age or older. The median age was 40 years. For every 100 women there were 87.9 men. For every 100 women age 18 and over, there were 81.9 men.

=== 2000 census ===
At the time of the census of 2000, there were 24,568 people living in the village, 9,201 households and 6,468 families. The population density was 7,496.5 inhabitants per square mile (2,894.4/km^{2}). There were 9,419 housing units at an average density of 2,874.0 per square mile (1,109.7/km^{2}); as of 2004. The racial makeup of the village was 84.3% White, 9.8% African American, 7.8% Hispanic or Latino of any race, 1.5% Asian, 0.08% Native American, 0.04% Pacific Islander, 3.0% from other races, and 1.03% from two or more races.

There were 9,201 households, of which 33.9% had children under the age of 18 living with them, 59.1% were married couples living together, 9.0% had a female householder with no husband present, and 29.7% were non-families. 26.9% of all households were made up of individuals, and 13.7% had someone living alone who was 65 years of age or older. The average household size was 2.64 and the average family size was 3.25. The population was spread out, with 25.8% under the age of 18, 5.8% from 18 to 24, 26.2% from 25 to 44, 25.9% from 45 to 64, and 16.3% who were 65 years of age or older. The median age was 40 years. For every 100 women there were 87.9 men. For every 100 women age 18 and over, there were 81.9 men.

=== Income and poverty ===
According to a 2007 estimate, the median income for a household in the village was $99,299, and the median income for a family was $128,579. Males had a median income of $70,149 versus $43,800 for females. The per capita income for the village was $40,739. 5.0% of the population and 2.8% of families were below the poverty line. Out of the total population, 7.0% of those under the age of 18 and 5.7% of those 65 and older were living below the poverty line.

== Geography ==
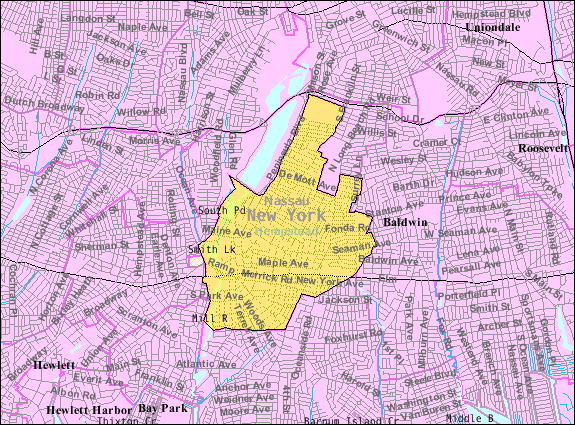
U.S. Census map of Rockville Centre.

According to the United States Census Bureau, the village has a total area of 3.4 square miles (8.8 km^{2}), of which 3.3 square miles (8.5 km^{2}) is land and 0.1 square miles (0.26 km^{2}) – or 2.38% – is water.

== Transportation ==
Rockville Centre is served by the Long Island Railroad at Rockville Centre station. NICE bus routes n4, n15, n16, n16C, and n31X serve here.

== Education ==
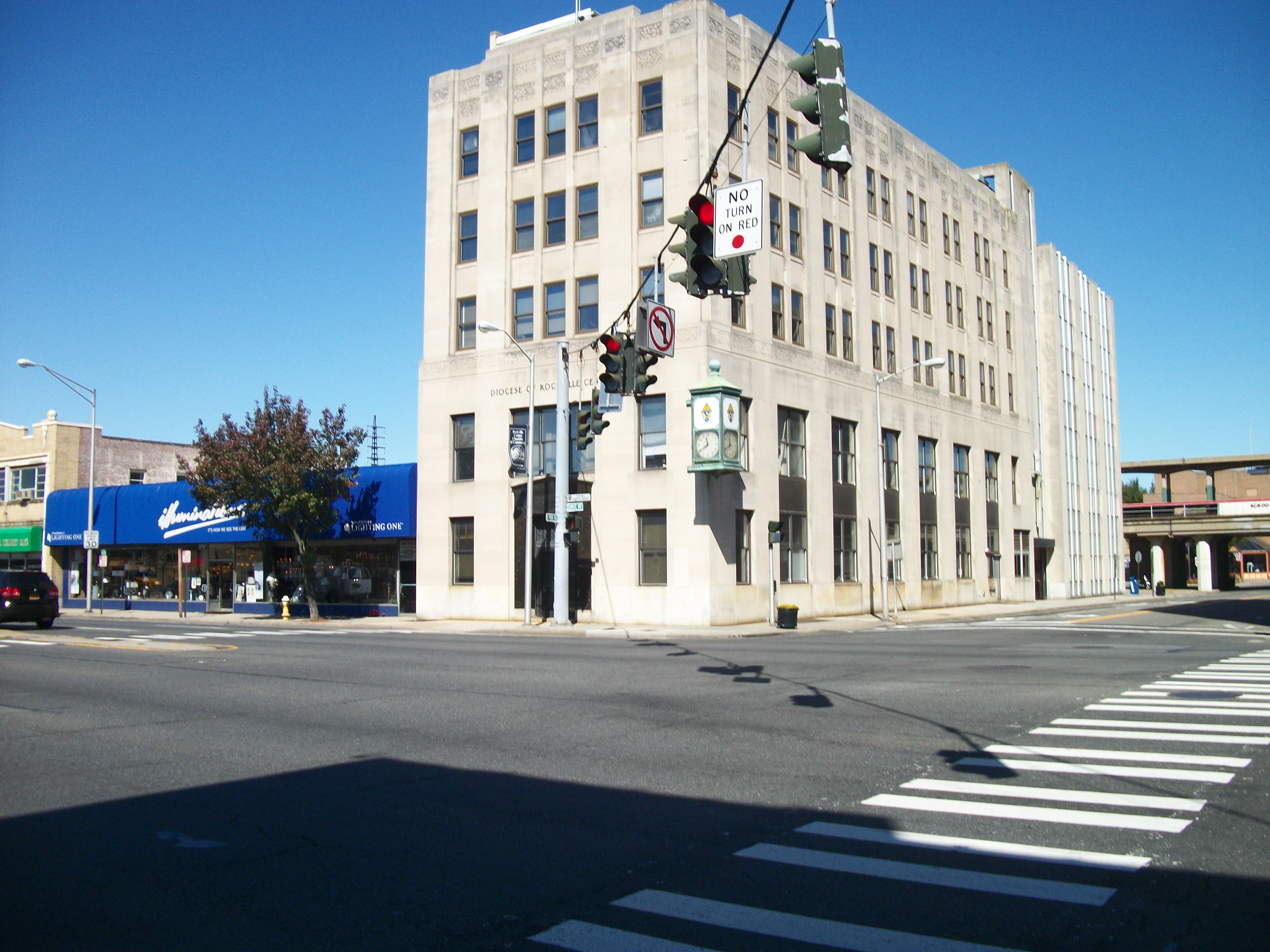
The headquarters of the Diocese of Rockville Centre on Sunrise Highway and North Park Avenue

Rockville Centre students attend the Rockville Centre Union Free School District, the Oceanside UFSD, and the Baldwin UFSD.

The Rockville Centre Union Free School District has five public elementary schools: The Watson School, The Covert School, The Wilson School, The Hewitt School, and The Riverside School. In addition to the elementary schools, Rockville Centre also consists of South Side Middle School and South Side High School. The district extends beyond Rockville Centre's borders, including part of South Hempstead, and Hempstead. Covert Elementary School is located in South Hempstead. Part of Rockville Centre is located in the Oceanside school district and a part in the Baldwin School District. There are 5 elementary schools as well as one middle school and one high school.

According to www.schooldigger.com, South Side High School ranks 116th out of 752 schools in New York state. This is based on actual test scores. In 2012, South Side High School was ranked #22 by U.S. News & World Report's Best High Schools, and #2 in the state of New York. It has also consistently rated in Newsweek's The Top of the Class: The complete list of the 1,300 top U.S. Schools, #42 in 2008, #44 in 2007, #32 in 2006, #45 in 2005 and #65 in 2003.

Approximately 20 percent of the residents of the Village of Rockville Centre live in the Oceanside Union Free School District. Rockville Centre students attend Oceanside School #2 and Oceanside School #5 as well as the Oceanside Middle School and Oceanside High School and some live in the Baldwin School District attending Plaza Elementary School, Baldwin Middle School, and Baldwin High School in Baldwin, New York.

Rockville Centre has one private K–8 Catholic day school, The Saint Agnes Cathedral School. The Saint Agnes Cathedral School occupies a single campus. The Saint Agnes Cathedral School provides day school education for kindergarten through eighth grade for families across Nassau County. The Saint Agnes Cathedral School's upper school (9–12), though now defunct, shared the complex at one time. The school is widely regarded for their consistently high-rated academic program among Long Island private schools, as well as their diverse secondary school placement.

== Notable people ==
Notable current and former residents of Rockville Centre include:

Hall of Famer Sandy Koufax

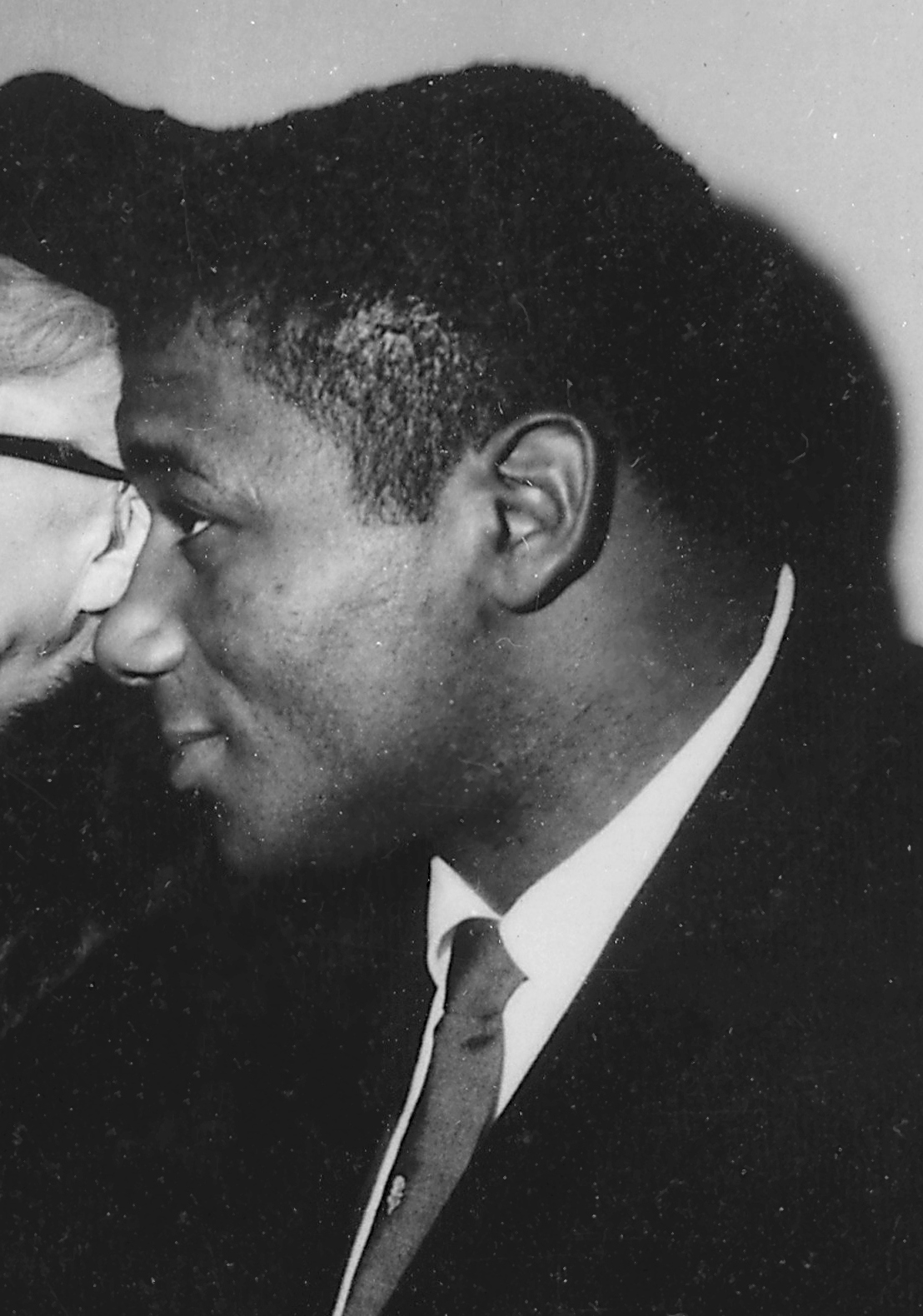
Hall of Famer Floyd Patterson

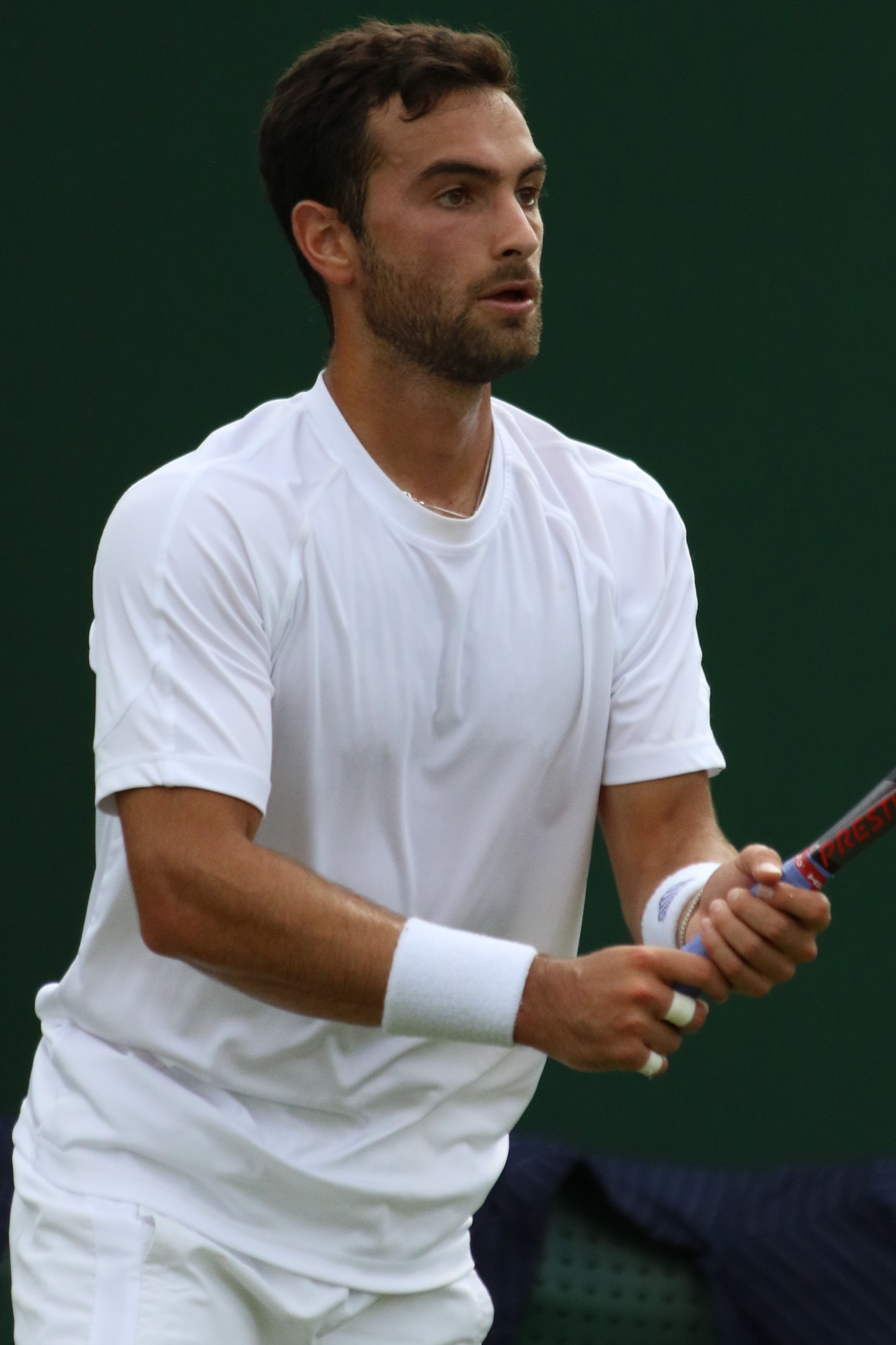
Noah Rubin

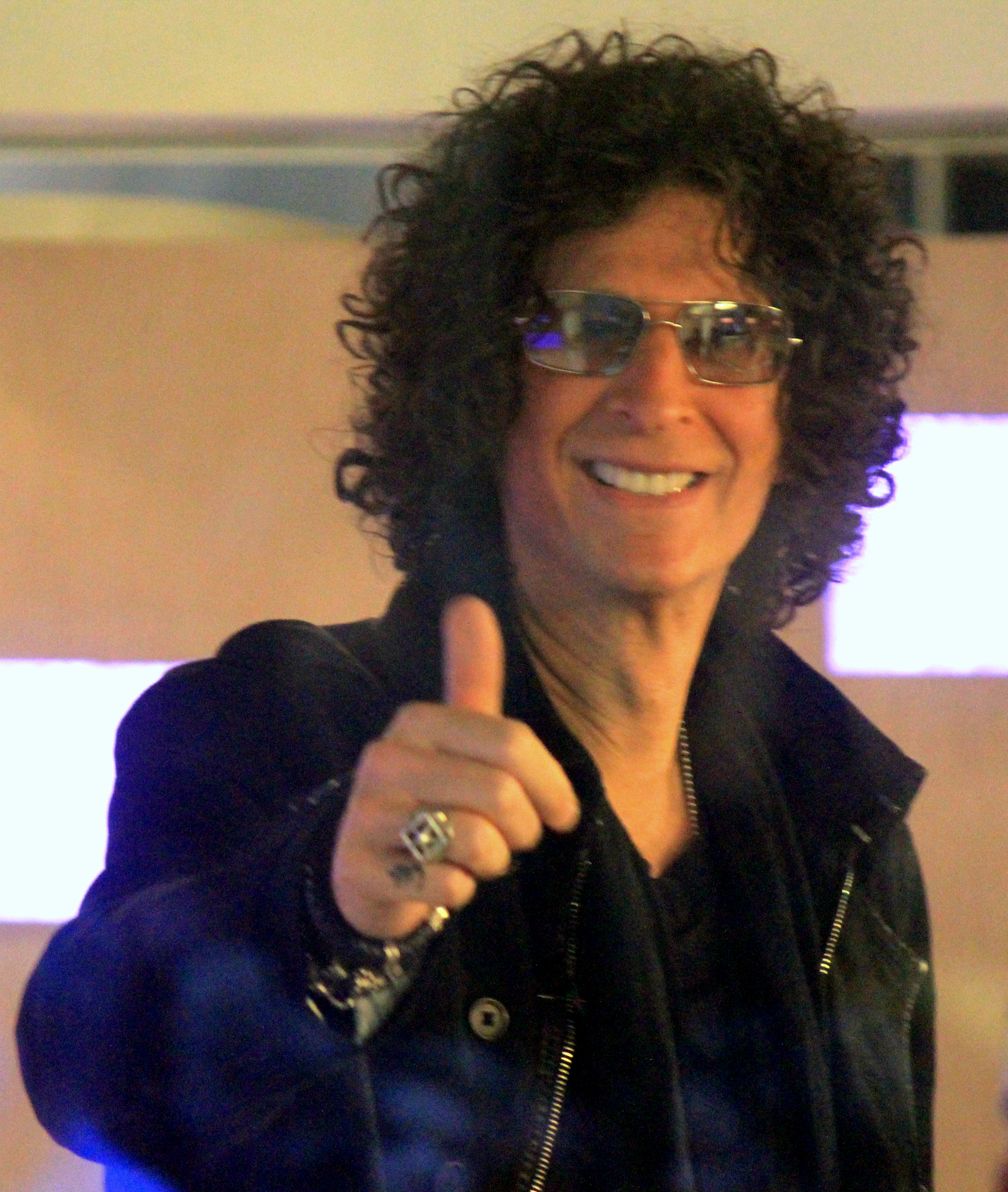
Howard Stern

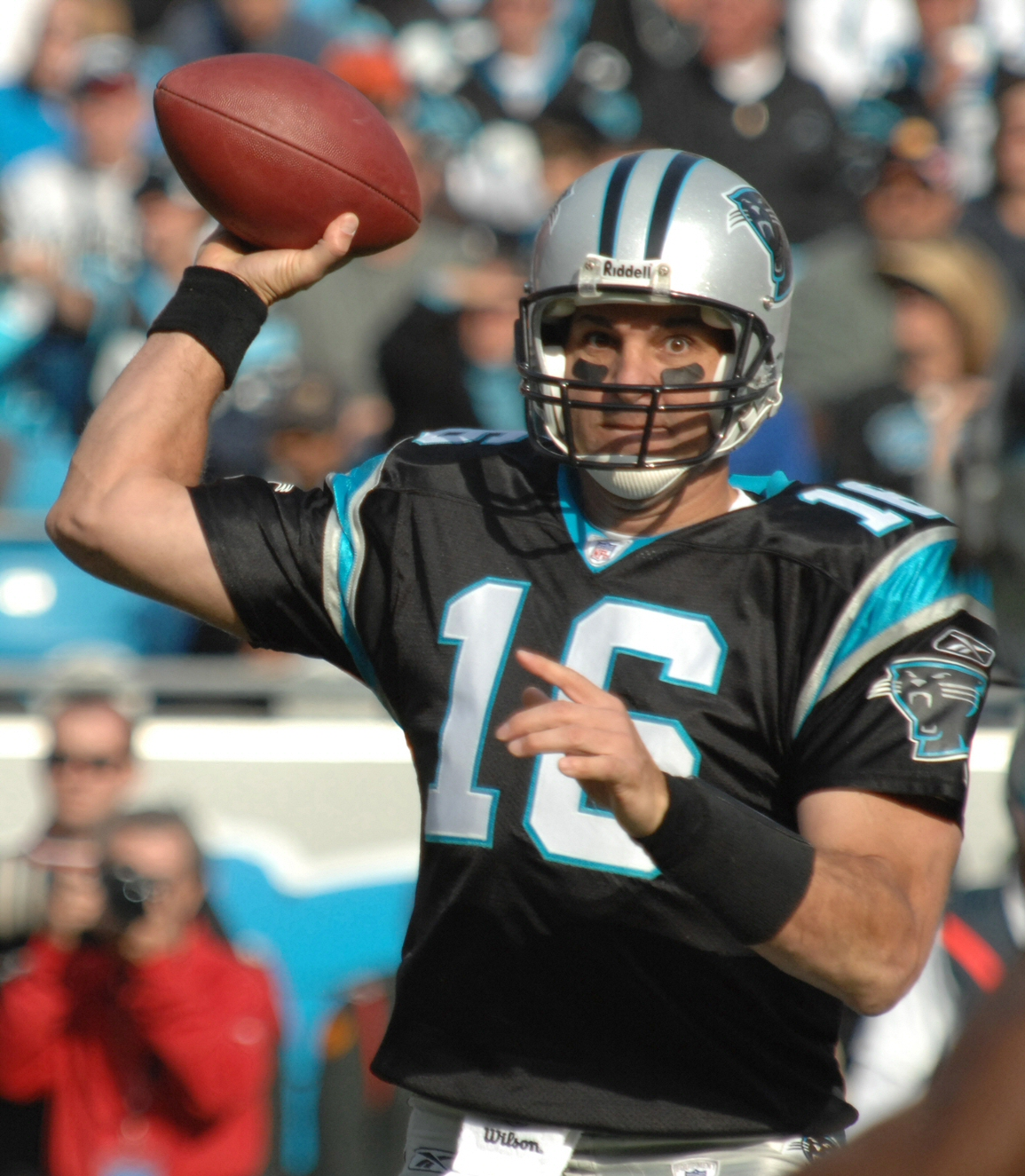
Vinny Testaverde

- Kevin Anderson (born 1971), soccer player and coach
- Eddie Arcaro (1916–1997), jockey who was inducted into the horse racing Hall of Fame.
- Dave Attell (born 1965), comedian.
- Pete Axthelm (1943–1991), sportswriter, columnist and TV commentator.
- Gina Naomi Baez, actress.
- Sy Berger (1923–2014), baseball card designer with Topps
- Tommy Bianco (born 1952), third baseman who played for the Milwaukee Brewers.
- John Byner (born 1938), impressionist, comedian and actor.
- John F. Carew (1873–1951), politician who served in the U.S. House of Representatives from 1913 to 1929.
- Brian Cashman (born 1967), general manager of the New York Yankees.
- Max Caster, professional wrestler for All Elite Wrestling (AEW)
- Kevin Connors, ESPN anchor.
- Ted Demme (1963–2002), film director and producer.
- Thomas DiNapoli. New York State Comptroller
- Billy Donovan (born 1965), head coach, Chicago Bulls, NBA.
- Crystal Dunn (born 1992), association football forward, U.S. Women's National Team.
- Martin Feldstein (1935–2019) Chief of Economic Advisors to Ronald Reagan.
- Joseph Fins (1959–), physician and medical ethicist.
- Bethenny Frankel (1970–), entrepreneur.
- Joel Gallen, television and film director/producer, and president of Tenth Planet Productions.
- Joe Gannascoli, actor, Vito Spatafore on The Sopranos
- Laura Gillen, U.S. representative for New York
- Doris Kearns Goodwin, author, historian, TV news analyst, 1995 Pulitzer Prize winner for history.
- Seth Grahame-Smith, writer and film producer.
- Judy Griffin, New York State Assemblywoman, currently lives in Rockville Centre
- Milton Gross, syndicated sports columnist for the New York Post (1912–1973)
- Mel Gussow (1933–2005), theater critic for The New York Times.
- Amy Hargreaves, actress.
- John D. Hawke Jr. (1933–2022), former United States Comptroller of the Currency
- Jim Hayes (1948–2009), all-time Boston University basketball scoring average leader.
- Joseph A. Healey (1930–2005), US Army major general
- Joey Heatherton (1944–), actress and entertainer.
- Ray Heatherton (1909–1997), actor.
- John E. Herbst (1959–), ambassador.
- Art Heyman (1941–2012), basketball player, All-American at Duke University.
- Henry Hill (1943–2012), mob informant.
- Donald Holder, stage lighting designer.
- Billy Idol, musician
- Dean Kamen (1951–), Segway Human Transporter inventor.
- Kerry Keating, head coach, Santa Clara University Broncos, former UCLA assistant coach.
- Kevin Kelton (1956–), TV writer-producer, wrote for Saturday Night Live.
- Gilbert King (1962–), author, Pulitzer Prize winner.
- Billy Koch (1974-), former pitcher for the Toronto Blue Jays.
- Sandy Koufax (1935–), Baseball Hall of Fame pitcher.
- Frank Layden (1932–), Niagara University coach, president and coach of NBA's Utah Jazz.
- Kenny Laguna, producer, songwriter and musician.
- David Wong Louie (1954–2018), novelist and short-story writer.
- Brian Mahoney (born 1948), New York Nets player [ABA]; head coach at Manhattan College and St. John's University.
- Brendan Malone (1942–), assistant coach for Detroit Pistons, former head coach of Toronto Raptors and Cleveland Cavaliers.
- Terry McDermott, baseball player for L.A. Dodgers.
- Anne Meara (1929–2015), actress and comedian, mother of actor Ben Stiller.
- Elliott Murphy (born 1949), singer-songwriter.
- John Nolan and Michelle Nolan of the band Straylight Run.
- Mark O'Connell, drummer of the band Taking Back Sunday, attended South Side High School.
- Daryl Palumbo (1979–), of the bands GlassJaw and Head Automatica.
- Floyd Patterson (1935–2006), boxer, Heavyweight Champion of the World.
- Frank Pellegrino, actor and restaurateur.
- Tommy Rainone (1980–), welterweight boxer.
- June Diane Raphael, actress, comedian, writer.
- Matt Reeves (1966–), film director.
- Bob Richardson (1928–2005), photographer.
- Tom Riker (1950–), basketball player.
- Joan Roberts, created role of Laurey in original production of Oklahoma! on Broadway.
- Ted Robinson, Emmy Award-winning radio and TV sportscaster.
- Noah Rubin (1996–), tennis player.
- Amy Schumer (1981–), comedian.
- Robert B. Silvers (1929–2017), editor of The New York Review of Books
- Dean Skelos, former New York State Senator; former New York State Senate Republican Majority Leader.
- Edward Smaldone, composer, born in Rockville Centre in 1956.
- Howard Stern (1954–), radio personality.
- Paulette Tavormina, photographer.
- Danielle Tumminio Hansen, author, theologian, and religious leader.
- Vinny Testaverde, College Hall of Fame quarterback, Heisman Trophy winner, 2-time NFL All Pro.
- Marc Turnesa, golfer on the PGA Tour.
- Jay Wright (1961–), former head coach of Villanova Wildcats basketball team.

== In popular culture ==
- Doris Kearns Goodwin's formative years in Rockville Centre is the subject of her 1997 memoir Wait Till Next Year.

== See also ==
- Roman Catholic Diocese of Rockville Centre
