= John Edmondson (musician) =

American musician

John B. Edmondson (February 3, 1933 – December 30, 2016) was an American professional trumpet player, pianist, music composer, former music teacher, and freelance writer (composer) and arranger.

== Biography ==
Edmondson is a member of ASCAP. He is listed on the international "Who's Who in Music," and also composed Bunker Hill March. Edmondson taught public school music for 10 years in the Central Kentucky area, where he wrote extensively for his own students. At the same time, Edmondson free lanced as a writer for various university and high school marching bands, including seven years as Staff Arranger for the University of Kentucky Wildcat Marching Band.
