= Winter Guard International =

US body for color guard championships

- Black and white logo
- Abbreviation: WGI
- Named after: Winter color guard competitive season
- Formation: May 15, 1977; 49 years ago
- Founded at: San Francisco
- Type: Performing arts organization
- Tax ID no.: 31-1421760
- Legal status: 501(c)(3) organization
- Purpose: Color guard, percussion ensemble, and winds competition circuit
- Headquarters: Dayton, Ohio
- Region served: United States
- Executive Director: Ron Nankervis
- President: Ed Devlin
- Revenue: ▲US$6.4 million (2025)
- Expenses: ▲US$6.4 million (2025)
- Website: wgi.org

Winter Guard International (WGI) is an American governing body that sanctions championship events for three competitive performing arts activities: winter guard, percussion ensembles, and indoor wind ensembles. WGI was founded in 1977 in response to inconsistent adjudication and rules of competition which made it difficult for color guards to compete nationally. Today, WGI publishes and maintains an adjudication handbook, with an accompanying "Rules & Regulations", that has been widely adopted.

WGI championship events are hosted from January to March and conclude with WGI World Championships in April. The first World Championship was hosted at Conant High School in Hoffman Estates, Illinois on April 15, 1978. World championships for percussion ensembles began in 1992, and indoor marching bands, called winds, in 2015. A series of field band competitions, promoted as the WGI Friendship Cup were hosted from 1997 to 2003. The next World Championships is scheduled for April 2027 at UD Arena.

A majority of WGI's championships are hosted in the United States, however regional championships have been hosted in Japan, Malaysia, United Kingdom, Netherlands, Philippines, and Costa Rica.

== History ==
Prior to the formation of WGI, national color guard championships, or other high-prestige championships, were held in conjunction with drum corps or marching band championships, such as: VFW, American Legion, CYO, or DCI World Championships. The quality of hosts varied widely, as did as the quality of venues and adjudication. As an example, the 1977 "national" color guard championship was held in conjunction with DCI World Championships in Denver. The venue was far too small, there was no functional air conditioning, and the performance area required color guards to maneuver around structural columns.

In 1977, then director of the Seattle Imperials, Stanley Knaub, secured a sponsor—Western Youth International—and a potential venue for a new national championships. However, Knaub was encouraged to seek input from others in the activity by Shirlee Whitcomb and Bryan Johnston. Knaub invited color guard educators from across the country to a meeting on May 14, 1977, at the Sheraton Palace Hotel in San Francisco. Those in attendance included: Don Angelica, Marie Czapinski, and Linda Chambers, in addition to Whitcomb, Johnston, and representatives from Western Youth International. All agreed any future national championship should be held independent of any drum corps or marching band events. Knaub suggested scheduling the championship during the winter months when most color guards competed locally—after marching band season when scholastic bands focused on concert events, but prior to the drum corps season. Whitcomb, Czapinski, and Chambers, advocated for a regional championship system with a national championship at the end of the winter season. The name "Winter Guard International" was suggested by Don Angelica.

A follow-up meeting at the December 1977 DCI Rules Congress included representatives from thirteen color guard circuits and adjudicator associations. The representatives adopted a draft adjudication system and rulebook, as well as voting on an organizational structure. Lynn Lindstrom, director of the Midwest Color Guard Circuit, was elected the first executive director of WGI. Four competition circuits donated $1,000 to fund WGI's first competitive season of fourteen regional championships and a two-day national championship called WGI Olympics. The first championship was hosted by Conant High School in Hoffman Estates, Illinois on April 14–15, 1978. Twenty-five color guards participated, and the top fifteen advanced to the finals competition. National championships would become the WGI World Championships in 1990.

== About ==
WGI is a nonprofit association governed by a board of directors, with an executive director, responsible for day-to-day operations. The board of directors are chosen from among the directors of competing groups, and at-large members are chosen from the community of color guard, percussion, and winds educators. The board of directors is legally and financially responsible for the conduct of the organization. In 2025, WGI's various programs and activities generated US$6.4 million in revenues.

=== Mission and purpose ===
The mission of organization is to provide a venue for young people to achieve the extraordinary through performance and competition. WGI organizes "high-energy and enjoyable" events for color guard, called winter guard, percussion and winds, divisions. The organization also aims to improve quality of the competing groups through leadership development and education. This includes standardized adjudication.

WGI frequently partners with companies that provide services and products to competing groups, as well as leading educators in other fields to highlight the activity. The organization is promoted using the tagline: Sport of the Arts.

=== Advisory Boards ===
Each of the three competitive divisions (color guard, percussion and winds) are led by Advisory Boards who are responsible for the "adjudication and competitive attributes" of sanctioned events. Advisory boards are also responsible for nominating and electing members to the board of directors.

The Advisory Boards meet annually, usually a few months after World Championships, to discuss changes to rules of competition, adjudication, and policies and procedures, and to make recommendations to the board of directors. The promotion of competing groups is also the responsibility of the Advisory Boards.

=== Membership ===
Groups that compete at WGI events are required to pay a membership fee, in addition to an attendance fee for each event. Only groups who compete in a regional, beginner, class with limited availability (Regional A Class) are excused from paying a membership fee. The fees support general operations, and provide capital for future events, educational services, and research and development.

=== Scholarships ===
WGI awards academic scholarships to members of competing groups, which are announced during awards ceremonies at World Championships. According to the WGI website, over US$35,000 is awarded annually, and US$1,000,000 has been awarded since 1978. Funds for scholarships are raised via raffles drawn during WGI events known as "Fifty-fifty".

=== Hosted competitions ===
Using a competition-based approach for organizing events, WGI "aims to showcase youth activities" by pursuing a "high standard of achievement." More than sixty regional championships are hosted every year, from mid-January to the late-March. Many are hosted with the aid of WGI's regional circuit partners. Regional championships attract hundreds of color guards, percussion and winds ensembles, and thousands of participants. To qualify for World Championships, groups must compete in at least one regional championship.

World Championships regularly attracts over 350 color guards, 250 percussion ensembles, and over 40 winds groups. Championships occur over two consecutive weekends in early or mid-April. Future World Championships dates have been reserved until 2024.

=== Alterations due to Covid-19 ===
In March 2020, the 2020 World Championships were cancelled in response to the COVID-19 pandemic. The 2021 WGI season was conducted using online tools as a WGI Virtual Season. Participants were given the option to participate in solo, small group, and large group categories.

=== Past championship sites ===
Year	Site
1978	Conant High School; Hoffman Estates, Illinois
1979	Veterans Memorial Coliseum; Madison, Wisconsin
1980	Cape Cod Coliseum; Cape Cod, Massachusetts
1981	Onondaga County War Memorial; Syracuse, New York
1982	Memorial Gymnasium; Vanderbilt University; Nashville, Tennessee
1983–1989	UD Arena; University of Dayton; Dayton, Ohio
1990	Buffalo Memorial Auditorium; Buffalo, New York
1991–1996	UD Arena; University of Dayton; Dayton, Ohio
1997	American West Arena; Phoenix, Arizona
1998–2000	UD Arena; University of Dayton; Dayton, Ohio
2001	Bradley Center; Milwaukee, Wisconsin
2002–03	UD Arena; University of Dayton; Dayton, Ohio
2004	Cox Arena; San Diego State University; San Diego, California
2005–present	UD Arena; University of Dayton; Dayton, Ohio

== Classification and adjudication ==
=== Winter Guard ===
Winter guard is the indoor variant of color guard and is a combination of the use of flags, sabers, mock rifles, and various other equipment and props. Performances include dance and other interpretive movement. Color guards are common among high schools, middle schools, some universities, and also some independent organizations such as drum corps, or they are community organizations. The term "winter guard" is taken from the season most color guards compete as single units, and not part of marching bands or drum corps.

=== Percussion ===
An indoor percussion ensemble or indoor drumline consists of marching percussion (also called the "battery") and front ensemble (also called pit or front line) sections. Many ensembles, like color guards, are attached to a competing marching band or drum corps, but many are independent ensembles. Indoor percussion integrates musicality, marching and movement, and theater arts. The activity is referred to as percussion theater by WGI.

There is also a "concert" classification for scholastic percussion ensembles without drumline, named so because performers are typically stationary, with no drill.

=== Winds ===
Indoor winds ensembles or indoor winds are small marching music ensembles composed of a variety of instrumentations. These ensembles are distinct from field bands, or marching bands. Many take advantage of marching horns, as well as woodwinds, rhythm sections, and a pit ensemble but not a full drumline or color guard. Unlike their outdoor counterparts, WGI Winds compete indoors on a performance area roughly the size of a standard basketball court. WGI's previous experiments in marching band competition were known as the Friendship Cup.

=== Divisions and classes ===
Groups attending WGI events are organized according to a multi-tier system, placed in one of two divisions, and dozens of classes.

- Independent Color guard, Percussion, and Winds divisions are reserved for groups composed of performers who are not associated with a particular secondary school. Independent groups often draw performers from a large geographic area and many are affiliated with colleges and universities.
- Scholastic Color guard, Percussion, and Winds divisions are reserved for groups composed of performers from the same high school, or high school equivalent, or a school within the attendance zone of that particular high School. The Scholastic division was created in 1980. Prior to the division's creation high school groups competed against Independent groups.

Divisions are further grouped into classes based on experience and achievement:

- Regional A is for new and inexperienced scholastic division groups. This class is not available at World Championships.
- A Class, often referred to as National A or National, is for groups new to national competition.
- Open Class is for groups who consistently perform at an intermediate developmental level.
- World Class is the highest available class and is reserved for experienced groups. The World classes in both Scholastic and Independent are the most competitive and the highest prestige.

=== Historic classes and divisions ===
The following are the divisions and classes represented at World Championships.

Notes:

- The tables below are simplified and do not reflect when specific competitive classes and divisions were defined in the WGI Adjudication Handbook.
- Other classes and divisions may be represented at regional championships or other WGI-sanctioned competitions.

==== Color guard division ====
1978–79	1980–1984	1985–1990	1991–92	1993–present
Open Class	Class A (Note: Also known as Class A, Associate Class, Junior Class, or National Class.)	Independent A (IA)		
Open Class	Open Class	Independent Open (IO)	Independent World (IW)	Independent Open (IO)
Open Class	Open Class	Independent Open (IO)	Independent World (IW)	Independent World (IW)
Open Class	Scholastic Class	Scholastic A (SA)		
Open Class	Scholastic Class	Scholastic Open (SO)	Scholastic World (SW)	Scholastic Open (SO)
Open Class	Scholastic Class	Scholastic Open (SO)	Scholastic World (SW)	Scholastic World (SW)

==== Percussion division ====
1993–1996	1997–2000	2001–2014	2015–present
Scholastic A (PSA)	Scholastic A (PSA)		
Scholastic A (PSA)	Scholastic Open (PSO)		
Scholastic A (PSA)	Scholastic World (PSW)		
Scholastic Concert World (PSCW)		Scholastic Concert Open (PSCO)	Scholastic Concert A (PSCA)
Scholastic Concert World (PSCW)		Scholastic Concert Open (PSCO)	Scholastic Concert Open (PSCO)
Scholastic Concert World (PSCW)		Scholastic Concert World (PSCW)	
Independent World (PIW)	Independent Open (PIO)	Independent A (PIA)	
Independent World (PIW)	Independent Open (PIO)	Independent Open (PIO)	
Independent World (PIW)	Independent World (PIW)		

=== Adjudication ===
WGI Adjudication Manuals for color guards, percussion, and winds, championships divide scoring in set reference criteria known as captions forming a scoring rubric. Each caption is subdivided into elements such as performance analysis, design analysis, and effect evaluation. The adjudication manual is multi-tiered, meaning each competitive class—Regional A, A Class, Open Class, and World Class—has a set of scoring sheets listing differing criteria and descriptions for each caption.

==== Color guard captions and scoring ====
Captions	Category		Points
Equipment	Vocabulary (10)	=	20.00
Equipment	Excellence (10)	=	20.00
Movement	Vocabulary (10)	=	20.00
Movement	Excellence (10)	=	20.00
Design	Vocabulary (10)	=	20.00
Design	Excellence (10)	=	20.00
Effect	Composition (10)	=	20.00 x 2
Effect	Excellence (10)	=	20.00 x 2
	Subtotal		100.00
	Timing & Penalties		0.00
	Total		100.00

==== Marching percussion captions and scoring ====
Caption	Category		Points
Music	Composition (10)	=	30.00
Music	Performance Quality (20)	=	30.00
Visual	Composition (10)	=	20.00
Visual	Performance Quality (10)	=	20.00
Music Effect	Overall Music (15)	=	30.00
Music Effect	Music Effect (15)	=	30.00
Visual Effect	Overall Visual (10)	=	20.00
Visual Effect	Visual Effect (10)	=	20.00
	Subtotal		100.00
	Timing & Penalties		0.00
	Total		100.00

==== Concert percussion captions and scoring ====
Caption	Category		Points
Music	Composition (20)	=	50.00
Music	Performance Quality (30)	=	50.00
Artistry	Program (20)	=	50.00
Artistry	Fulfillment (30)	=	50.00
	Subtotal		100.00
	Timing & Penalties		0.00
	Total		100.00

==== Winds captions and scoring ====
Caption	Category		Points
Music Analysis	Composition (15)	=	30.00
Music Analysis	Achievement (15)	=	30.00
Visual Analysis	Composition (15)	=	30.00
Visual Analysis	Achievement (15)	=	30.00
Overall Effect	Repertoire (20)	=	40.00
Overall Effect	Communication (20)	=	40.00
	Subtotal		100.00
	Timing & Penalties		0.00
	Total		100.00

== Media ==
Contemporary Color is a 2016 film directed by Turner Ross and Bill Ross featuring performances of several winter guard teams. The film was produced as a collaboration between David Byrne, Michael Gottwald, Dan Janvey and Josh Penn. Similarly, "On Guard: A Story of American Youth" is 2023 documentary film directed by Allen Otto and executive produced by Jim Czarnecki. The film follows the journey of an all-female color guard team at Bel Air High School whose goal is to qualify for the 2020 WGI World Championships, which were ultimately canceled due to the COVID-19 pandemic, with a performance dedicated to the victims of the 2019 El Paso Shooting.

== Past champions ==
=== Color guard (1978–present) ===
Year	Open Class	—	—	—	—	—
1978 (1st)	Quasar (Massachusetts)					
1979 (2nd)	Phantom Regiment ^{(1)} (Illinois)					
Year	Open Class	—	A Class	Scholastic Class (Note: Also known as Scholastic Open Class.)	—	—
1980 (3rd)	Phantom Regiment ^{(2)}		West Bridgewater HS (Massachusetts)	Holley Central HS ^{(1)} (New York)		
1981 (4th)	Cavaliers ^{(1)} (Illinois)		Conquest (New Jersey)	Holley Central HS ^{(2)}		
1982 (5th)	Cavaliers ^{(2)}		Elizabeth HS (New Jersey)	Marcus Whitman HS (New York)		
1983 (6th)	Cavaliers ^{(3)}		Woonsocket HS (Rhode Island)	Canandaigua Academy (New York)		
1984 (7th)	Skylarks (Connecticut)		Blue Horizon (Illinois)	Center Grove HS ^{(1)} (Indiana)		
Year	Independent Open (IO)	—	Independent A (IA)	Scholastic Open (SO)	—	Scholastic A (SA)
1985 (8th)	Erté (Massachusetts) (tie); State Street Review ^{(1)} (Wisconsin)		St Anthony's Imperials (Massachusetts)	Union HS ^{(1)} (Oklahoma)		Esprit de Corps (Note: Westerville South High School (Ohio) competed as Esprit de Corps.) (Ohio)
1986 (9th)	State Street Review ^{(2)}		Final Analysis (Mississippi)	Center Grove HS ^{(2)}		Hillwood HS (Tennessee)
1987 (10th)	State Street Review ^{(3)}		Studio One (Michigan)	Union HS ^{(2)}		Tempest (Note: Victor J. Andrew High School (Illinois) competed as Tempest.) (Illinois)
1988 (11th)	State Street Review ^{(4)}		Alliance (Massachusetts)	Union HS ^{(3)}		Abraham Lincoln HS (California)
1989 (12th)	State Street Review ^{(5)}		Accents (Wisconsin)	Chapparals (Note: Tate High School (Florida) competed as Chaparrals.) (Florida)		North Penn HS (Pennsylvania)
1990 (13th)	San José Raiders ^{(1)} (California) (tie); Blessed Sacrament (Massachusetts)		Genesis II (Ontario)	Center Grove HS ^{(3)}		Lincoln-Way Central HS (Illinois)
Year	Independent World (Note: Open class was renamed World class from 1991 to 1992.) (IW)	—	Independent A (IA)	Scholastic World (SW)	—	Scholastic A (SA)
1991 (14th)	San José Raiders ^{(2)}		Sacred Heart (Massachusetts)	Miamisburg HS ^{(1)} (Ohio)		Salisbury HS (Pennsylvania)
1992 (15th)	San José Raiders ^{(3)}		South Shore ^{(1)} (Illinois)	Miamisburg HS ^{(2)}		Southport HS (Indiana)
Year	Independent World (IW)	Independent Open (IO)	Independent A (IA)	Scholastic World (SW)	Scholastic Open (SO)	Scholastic A (SA)
1993 (16th)	San José Raiders ^{(4)}	St Patrick's Shamrocks (Massachusetts)	Nouveau (Texas)	Bishop Kearney HS ^{(1)} (New York)	Centerville HS ^{(1)} (Ohio)	Lakeland HS (Michigan)
1994 (17th)	San José Raiders ^{(5)}	Chimeras (Tennessee)	Florida Visual (Florida)	Bishop Kearney HS ^{(2)}	Pomona HS ^{(1)} (Colorado)	John Overton HS (Tennessee)
1995 (18th)	Blue Devils ^{(1)} (California)	Fantasia (California)	The Company (Florida)	Bishop Kearney HS ^{(3)}	John Overton HS (Tennessee)	Mt Carmel HS (California)
1996 (19th)	Blue Devils ^{(2)}	The Company (Florida)	St Ann's ^{(1)} (Massachusetts)	Bishop Kearney HS ^{(4)}	Springboro HS (Ohio)	Lassiter HS (Georgia)
1997 (20th)	Blue Devils ^{(3)}	Shadow Danse (New Jersey)	St John's (Massachusetts)	Bishop Kearney HS ^{(5)}	Lassiter HS (Georgia)	Kings HS (Ohio)
1998 (21st)	Blue Devils ^{(4)}	Patriots (New York)	Nolan Catholic (Texas)	James Logan HS ^{(1)} (California) (tie); Miamisburg HS ^{(3)}	Kings HS (Ohio)	Carroll HS (Ohio)
1999 (22nd)	Emerald Marquis (Massachusetts)	Nolan (Texas)	The Lakota (Ohio)	James Logan HS ^{(2)}	Pomona HS ^{(2)}	Nease HS (Florida)
2000 (23rd)	Fantasia ^{(1)} (California)	St Ann's ^{(1)} (Massachusetts)	Infinity (South Carolina)	James Logan HS ^{(3)}	Franklin Central HS (Indiana)	Lake Mary HS (Florida)
2001 (24th)	Pride of Cincinnati ^{(1)} (Ohio)	St Ann's ^{(2)}	Esperanza de Luz (California)	James Logan HS ^{(4)}	Avon HS (Indiana)	Walton HS (Georgia)
2002 (25th)	Fantasia ^{(2)}	Oracle (Colorado)	Lealta (California)	James Logan HS ^{(6)}	Irondale HS (Minnesota)	Fletcher HS (Florida)
2003 (26th)	San José Raiders ^{(6)}	Lealta (California)	Terpsichore (Connecticut)	James Logan HS ^{(6)}	Centerville HS ^{(2)}	Santaluces HS (Florida)
2004 (27th)	Fantasia ^{(3)}	Sacred Heart (Massachusetts)	St Ann's ^{(2)}	James Logan HS ^{(7)}	The Woodlands HS (Texas)	Kennesaw Mt HS (Georgia)
2005 (28th)	Pride of Cincinnati ^{(2)}	Interplay ^{(1)} (Michigan)	St John's of Beverly (Massachusetts)	James Logan HS ^{(8)}	Kennesaw Mt HS (Georgia)	Freedom HS (Florida)
2006 (29th)	Fantasia ^{(4)}	Croatan (North Carolina)	Étude (South Carolina)	James Logan HS ^{(9)}	Cheshire HS (Connecticut)	Gates Chili HS (New York)
2007 (30th)	Pride of Cincinnati ^{(3)}	Code Black (Texas)	Rhapsody (Washington)	James Logan HS ^{(10)}	Carmel HS (Indiana)	Taravella HS (Florida)
2008 (31st)	Fantasia ^{(5)}	Alter Ego (New Jersey)	Cascades (Washington)	Flanagan HS ^{(1)} (Florida)	Northmont HS (Ohio)	Colonial HS (Florida)
2009 (32nd)	Santa Clara Vanguard ^{(1)} (California)	Rhapsody (Washington)	State of Art (Michigan)	Avon HS ^{(1)} (Indiana)	Marian Catholic HS (Illinois)	North Syracuse Central (New York)
2010 (33rd)	Onyx ^{(1)} (Ohio)	O2 (Note: O2 (IO) was affiliated with Onyx (IW).) ^{(1)} (Ohio)	Pacificaires ^{(1)} (British Columbia)	James Logan HS ^{(11)}	West Johnston HS (North Carolina)	Little Elm HS (Texas)
2011 (34th)	Santa Clara Vanguard ^{(2)}	Pacificaires (British Columbia)	South Shore Drill Team ^{(2)}	Carmel HS ^{(1)} (Indiana)	Oak Ridge HS (Texas)	O'Fallon Twp HS (Illinois)
2012 (35th)	Onyx ^{(2)}	O2 ^{(2)}	Impact Independent (Virginia)	Flanagan HS ^{(2)}	Freedom HS (Florida)	Somerville HS (New Jersey)
2013 (36th)	Pride of Cincinnati ^{(4)}	Identity (Texas)	Luminosa (New York)	Carmel HS ^{(2)}	Mechanicsburg HS (Pennsylvania)	Bellbrook HS (Ohio)
2014 (37th)	Onyx ^{(3)}	UCF Pegasus (Note: The Pegasus color guard was previously sponsored by the University of Central Florida.) (Florida)	Georgia State University (Georgia)	Tarpon Springs HS ^{(1)} (Florida)	Spring HS (Texas)	Lyman HS (Florida)
2015 (38th)	Santa Clara Vanguard ^{(3)}	Interplay ^{(2)}	St Ann's ^{(4)}	Carmel HS ^{(3)}	Somerville HS (New Jersey)	Marvin Ridge HS (North Carolina)
2016 (39th)	Pride of Cincinnati ^{(5)}	Juxtaposition (Ohio)	Paramount A (Note: Paramount (IA) winter guard was affiliated with Paramount (IW).) (Georgia)	Tarpon Springs HS ^{(2)}	Shenendehowa HS (New York)	Bellevue West HS (Nebraska)
2017 (40th)	Pride of Cincinnati ^{(6)}	AMP (New Jersey)	FIU ^{(1)} (Florida)	Carmel HS ^{(4)}	Stockdale HS (California)	Klein Oak HS (Texas)
2018 (41st)	Paramount ^{(1)} (Georgia)	UCF Pegasus ^{(2)}	Pacificaires ^{(2)}	Avon HS ^{(2)}	Park Vista HS (Florida)	Leander HS (Texas)
2019 (42nd)	Pride of Cincinnati ^{(7)}	George Mason University (Virginia)	Icon (California)	Avon HS ^{(3)}	Fishers HS (Indiana)	Fleming Island HS (Florida)
2020 (43rd)	Championships cancelled					
2021 (44th)	Ratings only					
2022 (45th)	Pride of Cincinnati ^{(8)}	USF (Florida)	FIU Gold ^{(2)}	Avon HS ^{(4)}	Kiski Area HS (Pennsylvania)	Somerset Academy (Florida)
2023 (46th)	Paramount ^{(2)}	Vox Artium (California)	Pacificaires ^{(3)}	Carmel HS ^{(5)}	Somerset Academy (Florida)	Dobyns-Bennett HS (Tennessee)
2024 (47th)	Fusion ^{(1)} (New Jersey)	Georgia Winterguard	Georgia State University ^{(2)}	Avon HS ^{(5)}	Ayala HS (California)	Arlington HS (New York)
2025 (48th)	Pride of Cincinnati ^{(9)}	Third Legend (French: 3e Légende) (Québec)	Homage (Ohio)	The Woodlands HS (Texas)	Little Elm HS (Texas)	Pope HS (Georgia)
2026 (49th)	Fusion ^{(2)}	First Flight (North Carolina)	Caledonia Independent (Michigan)	Arcadia HS (California)	Oviedo HS (Florida)	Southington HS (Connecticut)

=== Scholastic percussion (1993–present) ===
Year	—	—	Marching A (PSA)	Concert World (PSCW)	—	—
1993 (16th)			Clovis West HS	No champion		
1994 (17th)			Lincoln-Way HS Central	Baldwinsville HS ^{(1)}		
1995 (18th)			Father Ryan HS ^{(1)} (A) Hatboro-Horsham HS (AA)	Baldwinsville HS ^{(2)}		
1996 (19th)			Avon HS (A) (tie); Father Ryan HS ^{(2)} (A) John Overton HS (AA)	Gateway HS ^{(1)}		
Year	Marching World (PSW)	Marching Open (PSO)	Marching A (PSA)	Concert World (PSCW)	—	—
1997 (20th)	Northglenn HS	Avon HS ^{(1)}	Clayton Valley HS	Gateway HS ^{(2)}		
1998 (21st)	Dartmouth HS ^{(1)}	Arvada HS	Johansen HS	Franklin Central HS ^{(1)}		
1999 (22nd)	Dartmouth HS ^{(2)}	Centerville HS	Ayala HS	Franklin Central HS ^{(2)}		
2000 (23rd)	King Philip HS	Father Ryan HS	Loara HS (tie); Thomas Worthington HS	Franklin Central HS ^{(3)}		
Year	Marching World (PSW)	Marching Open (PSO)	Marching A (PSA)	Concert World (PSCW)	Concert Open (PSCO)	—
2001 (24th)	Mission Viejo HS	Avon HS ^{(2)}	Springboro HS	Franklin Central HS ^{(4)}	Union HS	
2002 (25th)	Avon HS	Choctawhatchee HS	New Palestine HS	Franklin Central HS ^{(5)}	New Albany HS	
2003 (26th)	Winston Churchill HS	Thomas Worthington HS	Clovis East HS	Fort Mill HS ^{(1)}	Portsmouth HS ^{(1)}	
2004 (27th)	Centerville HS	Rancho Cucamonga HS	Loara HS ^{(2)}	Franklin Central HS ^{(6)}	Mission Viejo HS	
2005 (28th)	Center Grove HS ^{(1)}	Clear Brook HS	Page HS	Fort Mill HS ^{(2)}	Goshen HS	
2006 (29th)	Center Grove HS ^{(2)}	Pacifica HS ^{(1)}	Mariner HS	Ayala HS ^{(1)}	Heritage HS	
2007 (30th)	Mission Viejo HS	Pacifica HS ^{(2)}	Greenfield-Central HS	Ayala HS ^{(2)}	Mansfield HS ^{(1)}	
2008 (31st)	Dartmouth HS ^{(3)}	Pacifica HS ^{(3)}	South Hills HS	Claremont HS	Mansfield HS ^{(2)}	
2009 (32nd)	Dartmouth HS ^{(4)}	Pacifica HS ^{(4)}	Los Alamitos HS	Ayala HS ^{(3)}	Muscle Shoals HS ^{(1)}	
2010 (33rd)	Ayala HS	South Hills HS	Timber Creek HS	Ayala HS ^{(4)}	Golden HS	
2011 (34th)	Arcadia HS	Pacifica HS ^{(5)}	Chantilly HS	Muscle Shoals HS	Portsmouth HS ^{(2)}	
2012 (35th)	Chino Hills HS ^{(1)}	South Hills HS ^{(2)}	Lebanon HS	Woodbridge HS	Hickory HS	
2013 (36th)	Chino Hills HS ^{(2)}	Upper Darby HS	Hilton HS	James Logan HS	Clayton HS	
2014 (37th)	Dartmouth HS ^{(5)}	Clinton HS	Victor J. Andrew HS ^{(1)}	Ayala HS ^{(5)}	Goshen HS	
2015 (38th)	Chino Hills HS ^{(3)}	Lebanon HS	Lake Orion HS	Ayala HS ^{(6)}	Mansfield HS ^{(3)}	
2016 (39th)	Ayala HS ^{(2)}	Sparkman HS ^{(1)}	Victor J. Andrew HS ^{(2)}	Ayala HS ^{(7)}	Dakota Ridge HS	
2017 (40th)	Chino Hills HS ^{(4)}	Burleson Centennial HS	Fair Lawn HS	Ayala HS ^{(8)}	Tomball HS	
Year	Marching World (PSW)	Marching Open (PSO)	Marching A (PSA)	Concert World (PSCW)	Concert Open (PSCO)	Concert A (PSCA)
2018 (41st)	Chino Hills HS ^{(5)}	Clear Brook HS	Plainfield HS	Fishers HS ^{(1)}	Clayton HS	Decatur Central HS
2019 (42nd)	Chino Hills HS ^{(6)}	Sparkman HS ^{(2)}	Grand Blanc HS	Fishers HS ^{(2)}	Campbell County HS	Price Charter
2020 (43rd)	Championships cancelled					
2021 (44th)	Ratings only					
2022 (45th)	Avon HS ^{(2)}	Sherwood HS	Clover HS	Fishers HS ^{(3)}	Muscle Shoals HS ^{(2)}	East Central HS
2023 (46th)	Ayala HS ^{(3)}	Clover HS	Irondale Combined Schools	Fishers HS ^{(4)}	Cleveland HS	Warren East HS ^{(1)}
2024 (47th)	Chino Hills HS ^{(7)}	Victor J. Andrew HS ^{(1)}	Spring-Ford HS	Catawba Ridge HS	Grassfield HS	Eagle HS
2025 (48th)	Ayala HS ^{(4)}	Victor J. Andrew HS ^{(2)}	Clinton HS	Ayala HS ^{(9)}	North Forney HS	Everett HS
2026 (49th)	Ayala HS ^{(5)}	Sonia Sotomayor HS	Alpharetta HS	Vista Murrieta HS	Klein Collins HS	Warren East HS ^{(2)}

=== Independent percussion (1994–present) ===
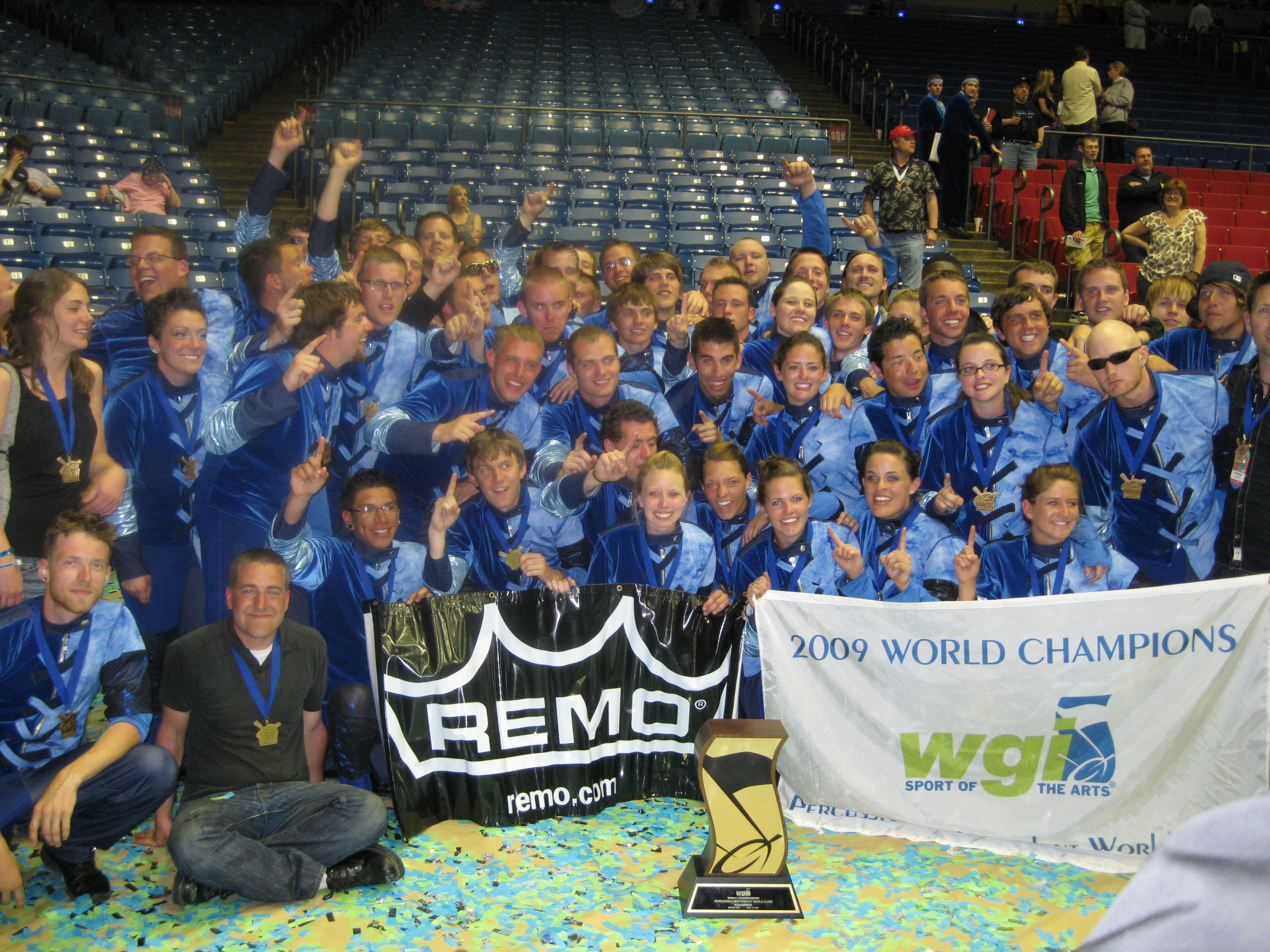
Rhythm X after being awarded gold medals in Percussion Independent World Class at the 2009 Winter Guard International Percussion World Championships

Year	Independent World (PIW)	—	—
1994 (17th)	Blue Knights ^{(1)}		
1995 (18th)	Atlanta Rhythm Machine		
1996 (19th)	Music City Mystique ^{(1)}		
Year	Independent World (PIW)	Independent Open (PIO)	—
1997 (20th)	Music City Mystique ^{(2)} Patriots ^{(1)} (PCW) UNLV (PCU)	South Mountain	
1998 (21st)	Music City Mystique ^{(3)} Patriots ^{(2)} (PCW)	Freelancers	
1999 (22nd)	Blue Knights ^{(2)} Cynosure (PCW) Georgia Tech (PCU)	South Maine	
Year	Independent World (PIW)	Independent Open (PIO)	Independent A (PIA)
2000 (23rd)	Blue Knights ^{(3)}	Penn State	Eastside Fury
2001 (24th)	Music City Mystique ^{(4)}	Eklipse	Arthur Hill
2002 (25th)	Riverside City College ^{(1)}	Rhythm X	Plan B
2003 (26th)	Blue Knights ^{(4)}	North Coast Academy	L.E.A.P. ^{(1)}
2004 (27th)	Music City Mystique ^{(5)}	Eastside Fury	L.E.A.P. ^{(2)}
2005 (28th)	Riverside City College ^{(2)}	Surround Sound	Elements
2006 (29th)	Music City Mystique ^{(6)}	First Degree	Walled Lake
2007 (30th)	Riverside City College ^{(3)}	United	Pioneer ^{(1)}
2008 (31st)	Rhythm X ^{(1)}	Tyler Junior College	Pioneer ^{(2)}
2009 (32nd)	Rhythm X ^{(2)}	Pariah	OCI
2010 (33rd)	Pulse ^{(1)}	Palmetto	Dojo
2011 (34th)	Music City Mystique ^{(7)}	Vanguard	Madison
2012 (35th)	Riverside City College ^{(4)}	George Mason University	Spirit of America
2013 (36th)	Rhythm X ^{(3)}	Capital City	Brookwood
2014 (37th)	Pulse ^{(2)}	Cadets	Lone Star
2015 (38th)	Riverside City College ^{(5)}	Spirit of America	PureFusion
2016 (39th)	Pulse ^{(3)}	Vigilantes	STRYKE 2
2017 (40th)	Music City Mystique ^{(8)}	Infinity 2	Modulation Z
2018 (41st)	Riverside City College ^{(6)}	Matrix Open	IMPACT
2019 (42nd)	Broken City	Bakersfield College	Unity
2020 (43rd)	Championships cancelled		
2021 (44th)	Ratings only		
2022 (45th)	Pulse ^{(4)}	Infinity 2 ^{(2)}	Matrix A
2023 (46th)	Pulse ^{(5)}	Meraki ^{(1)}	Modulation Z ^{(2)}
2024 (47th)	Pulse ^{(6)}	Meraki ^{(2)}	M3 ^{(1)}
2025 (48th)	Riverside City College ^{(7)}	Veritas ^{(1)}	M3 ^{(2)}
2026 (49th)	Rhythm X ^{(4)}	Veritas ^{(2)}	Ravenwood

=== Winds (2015–present) ===
Year	Independent World (WIW)	Independent Open (WIO)	Independent A (WIA)	Scholastic World (WSW)	Scholastic Open (WSO)	Scholastic A (WSA)
2015 (38th)	Rhythm X ^{(1)}	FIU	Inertia ^{(1)}	Father Ryan HS	Ola HS	Nova HS
2016 (39th)	Aimachi (Japan)	STRYKE Wynds	FIU	Avon HS ^{(1)}	Cleveland HS	Jackson County HS
2017 (40th)	Rhythm X ^{(2)}	Chromium ^{(1)}	Inertia ^{(2)}	Avon HS ^{(2)}	Central Lafourche HS	Valley Christian HS ^{(1)}
2018 (41st)	Rhythm X ^{(3)}	Chromium ^{(2)}	Valley Christian	Flanagan HS	Azle HS	Lake Hamilton HS
2019 (42nd)	Rhythm X ^{(4)}	Chromium ^{(3)}	Daviess County HS	Cleveland HS	South Jones HS	Valley Christian HS ^{(2)}
2020 (43rd)	Championships cancelled					
2021 (44th)	Ratings only					
2022 (45th)	UTRGV	Chromium ^{(4)}	LSM Winds	Avon HS ^{(3)}	Miamisburg HS	Corinth Holders HS
2023 (46th)	STRYKE Wynds ^{(1)}	LSM Winds	Eva Independent; Winds	Avon HS ^{(4)}	Westfield HS	Bob Jones HS
2024 (47th)	STRYKE Wynds ^{(2)}	Valhalla Winds ^{(1)}	Ethereal Winds ^{(1)}	Avon HS ^{(5)}	Catawba Ridge HS	Valley Christian HS ^{(3)}
2025 (48th)	STRYKE Wynds ^{(3)}	Valhalla Winds ^{(2)}	Ethereal Winds ^{(2)}	Avon HS ^{(6)}	Daviess County HS ^{(1)} (tie); Robert Vela HS	Edinburg HS
2026 (49th)	STRYKE Wynds ^{(4)}	Obsidian Winds	Hydra Winds (Note: Hydra Winds is a program of Atlanta CV Drum & Bugle Corps.)	Avon HS ^{(7)}	Daviess County HS ^{(2)}	Damien HS

== See also ==
- Bands of America
- Drum Corps International
- Mid-America Competing Band Directors Association
