= Color guard (flag spinning) =

Performers

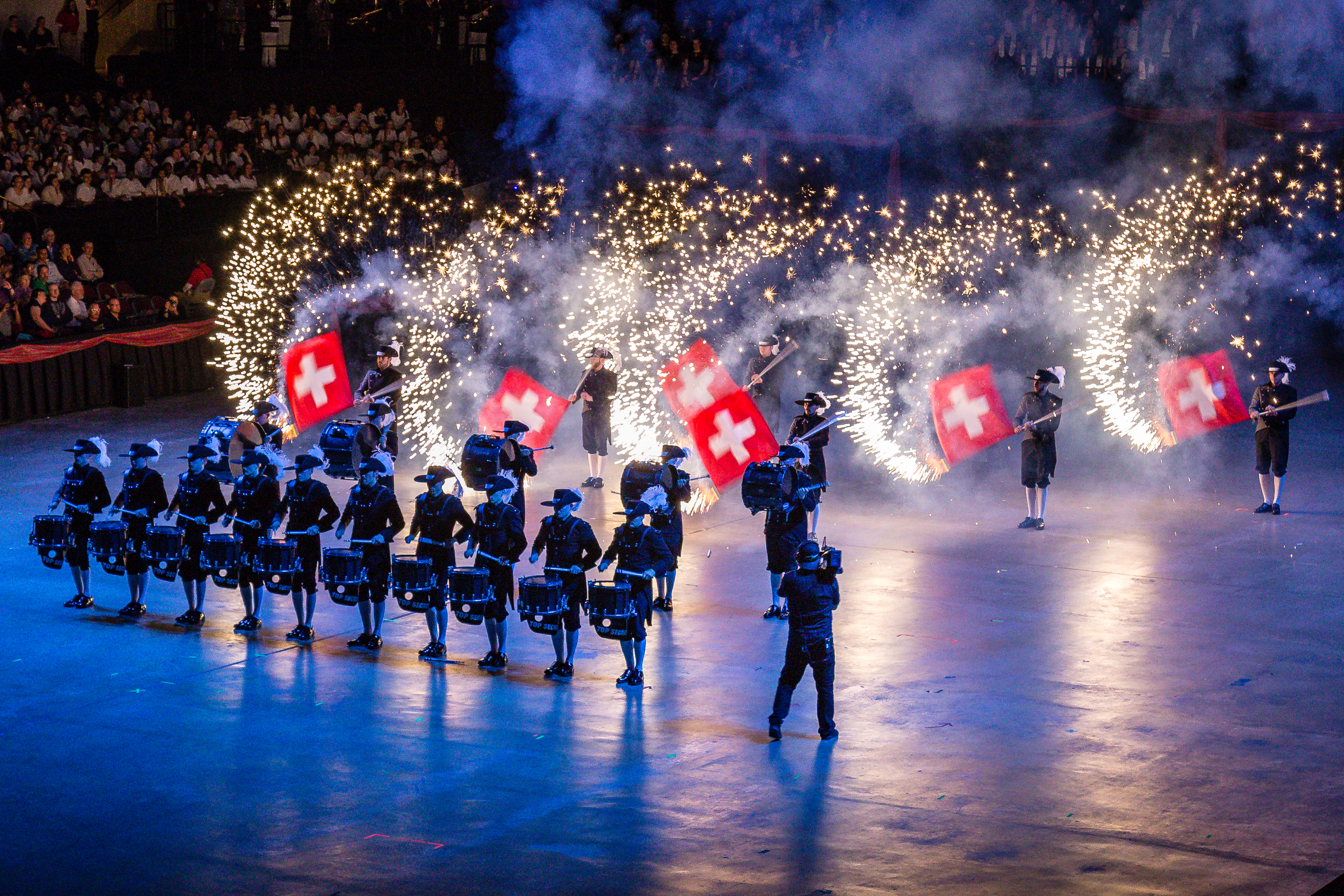
Color guard of the Top Secret Drum Corps performing at the Virginia International Tattoo in 2016

Color guards or flag corps are teams of performers who perform choreographed dances and routines with various equipment to enhance and interpret the music of a marching band or drum and bugle corps show. Color guard teams can be found in American colleges, universities, high schools, middle schools, and independent drum corps. They use various equipment including flags, fake (wooden or plastic) rifles, and sabres, along with other props. Most Color Guard groups are of mixed gender but some may also be single gender.

They perform using their equipment (flag, rifle, sabre, prop, etc.) and emotional connections (facial expressions and dance and sometimes voice) to the audience to enhance the meaning and feeling of their show.

Some color guards perform with marching bands during American football games at halftime. During marching band competitions, the guard adds to the overall score of the band and can be judged in many categories, including but not limited to: visual effects, general effect, auxiliary, and color guard.

Color guards have since evolved into a separate activity known as winter guard, which is an indoor sport usually performed during the winter or spring, where the guard performs unaccompanied by a marching band to a piece of pre-recorded music indoors. Winter guards compete independently in circuits such as Winter Guard International (WGI), Tournament Indoor Association (TIA), or Keystone Indoor Drill Association (KIDA).

== History ==
A military color guard often traveled with a band, who would play patriotic songs. This way of performing continued into the civilian marching bands, and today a marching band's color guard is usually found carrying equipment descending from those of military color guard: flags, banners, wooden or plastic rifles, and plastic or metal sabres. Modern guards use real sabers as well, but without the sharpened point.

One tradition that contributed to color guards in American marching bands is the Swiss art of flag swinging or Fahnenschwingen. The 1936 Olympian Franz Hug of Lucern, Switzerland, came to America and introduced flag swinging in 1937. Leonard Haug, an assistant band director at the University of Wisconsin, was intrigued. Haug created ten flags representing the schools of the Big Ten Conference. When Haug came to the University of Oklahoma the following year, he became the first to introduce the technique in the Southwest and formed a corps of Big Six Conference flag swingers for the Pride of Oklahoma Marching Band. The 1938 squad was all male, but the group was co-ed within two years. By 1940, O.U. flag swingers were participating at basketball games and creating innovative routines with two flags. The OU color guard may be the oldest existing unit of its kind in American marching bands. As Director of the OU band, Haug wrote a training guide for flag swinging and an article for a swing flag brochure, assisting the spread of the trend to other marching bands.

In 1965, Haug succeeded in combining the swing flag with a baton. It was an idea on which he had worked for years. He called his invention the "twirl-flag" baton. He wrote that it was "a truly American flag baton idea suitable for solo and corps exhibition." It was a 32" baton with a colored flag at each end that rotated around the shaft to prevent fouling. The invention was first featured by the University of Arkansas marching band at the Cotton Bowl on January 1, 1966, and later manufactured by Kraskin Batons of Minneapolis. For all of Haug's efforts, however, the "twirl-flag" baton never caught on, but regular flags and batons remained standard for most marching bands.

During the 1950s and 1960s, much of the impetus for the evolution of the modern color guard came from the arena of competitive drum and bugle corps. Pioneers from these corps traveled to other areas of the country to teach, introducing color guards to more traditional bands. In 1962, Vincent R. DiNino, Director of the Longhorn Band, "The Showband of the Southwest", at the University of Texas began the use big 4'x6' flags in the school colors (orange and white) as a group marching with the band at halftime shows at football games. Since flags of that type were not then available from any commercial vendors, his wife, Jane DiNino, sewed the flags. The flag poles were made of lightweight dowel wood purchased at a local lumber yard with flag holders purchased from a local army-navy surplus store. Movies of the Longhorn Band taken by the Athletic Department at the University of Texas captured the first use of big flags by a college marching band. Director DiNino charged a band member, Larry Cullison, with the duty of charting movements of the flags and working the flags into the performance of the band during halftime performances. By 1972, there were 16 big flags in use as a part of the Longhorn Marching Band at the University of Texas. The use of big flags spread throughout the Southwest Conference. The band directors at the University of Memphis (Memphis State), Dr. Tom Ferguson and Art Theil, recruited music major Sam Shaw to start one of the first collegiate color guards in the South, the "Bengal Lancers" in 1974. Director of Bands at Northwestern University, John Paynter, was also one of the first to add a color guard to the marching band when he hired Bugle Corp specialist George Parks in 1976. Consequently, color guards spread quickly throughout the country. The visual effect of spinning and shaking flags drew the attention of crowds and quickly caught on. Having visual impact for pieces played when the band stood still added a whole new dimension to the performance. By the late 1970s and into the mid-1980s color guards had been added to most Southwest Conference, Big Ten and Big 8 (Currently Big 12) bands. Once these prominent university bands had color guards, there was widespread inclusion of guards at high schools across the nation in the 1980s and 1990s. The popularity of color guard has grown such that winter guard has gained widespread membership and attention.

Color guard was not always accepted among marching band organizations. As Arthur Williams stated in his 1958 book, The College and University Band, "If it actually made no difference to your high school or community whether or not you fronted your band with girl majorettes, baton twirlers, flag swingers, pompom girls, and so on, what would you prefer? Favor use of girl majorettes and so on: 52 percent. Prefer no use of girl majorettes and so on: 48 percent." The University of Wisconsin, where Leonard Haug first introduced conference flags, has since discontinued the practice of having a color guard.

== Marching band ==
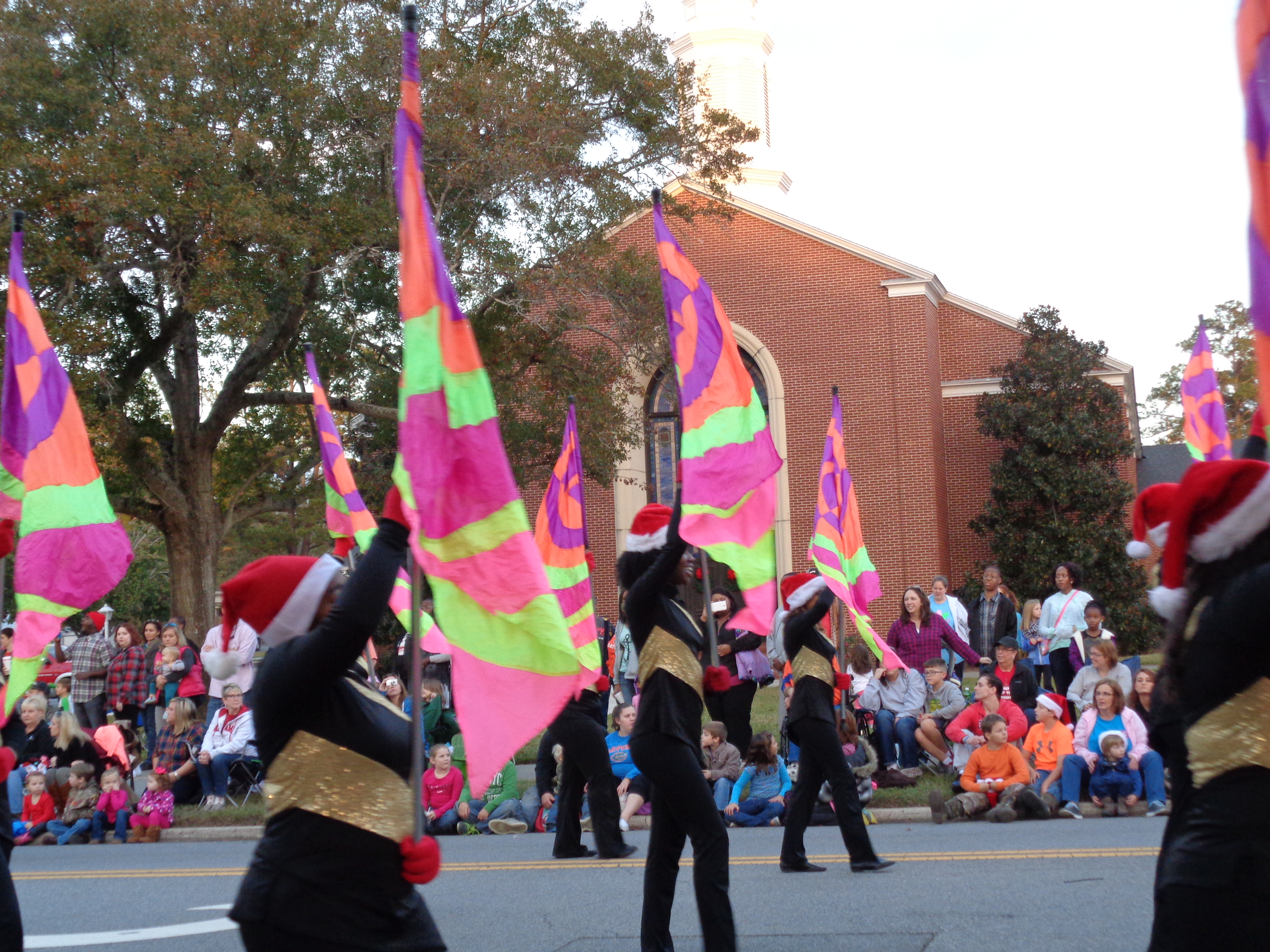
The Valdosta High School Marching Band Color Guard at the 2015 Greater Valdosta Community Christmas Parade.

In a marching band or a drum and bugle corps, the color guard is a non-musical section that provides additional visual aspects to the performance. The marching band and color guard performance generally takes place on a football field. The color guard performs alongside the marching band at football games and most guards regularly compete in competitions during the fall. The purpose of the color guard is to interpret the music that the marching band or drum and bugle corps is playing via the synchronized work of flags, sabers, rifles, the air blade, by dance, or by using non-traditional equipment specific to the show theme. The color guard uses different colors and styles of flags like swing flags and tapered flags to enhance the visual effect of the marching band as a whole. Color guard also may use backdrops to bring color and scenery to the field if the concept of the show is hard to interpret. The number of members in a color guard can range from a single person to over 50 members. This is often dependent on the size of the band, school or corps, the allotted budget, and the talent available among the potential members who try out.

In drum and bugle corps, there used to be a requirement for a traditional presentation of the colors during the competitive show (called the "Color Pre"), but this fell out of favor around the early 1970s. High school marching bands kept it in until the late '70s. A recent example of a Color Pre in show was the 2002 San Francisco Renegades Sr corps, used during "America the Beautiful" to open their program, but such a presentation was not a required part of the show.

There are many different types of spins and tosses that can be done with the flag. Each spin or toss creates a different illusion and can be used for different tempos. Basic color guard moves include Jazz runs (a Jazz dance move used as a graceful way to run across the marching band field or the gym floor), "right shoulder" (positioning the flag with the bottom of the pole by your belly button and your right hand by the flag's silk tape) and "stripping the flag" (holding the flag silk with your fingers so you won't reveal the color(s) of the flag.) Flag poles and silks both come in different sizes, and there are different shapes and textures for silks, as well. Flags frequently have weights -generally 1 in. carriage bolts or the like- in the bottom and top of the pole to make it easier to toss the flag into the air. However, even with the weights, weather conditions such as wind and rain can affect a flag's spin and disrupt a toss if not correctly taken into account.

== Winter guard ==
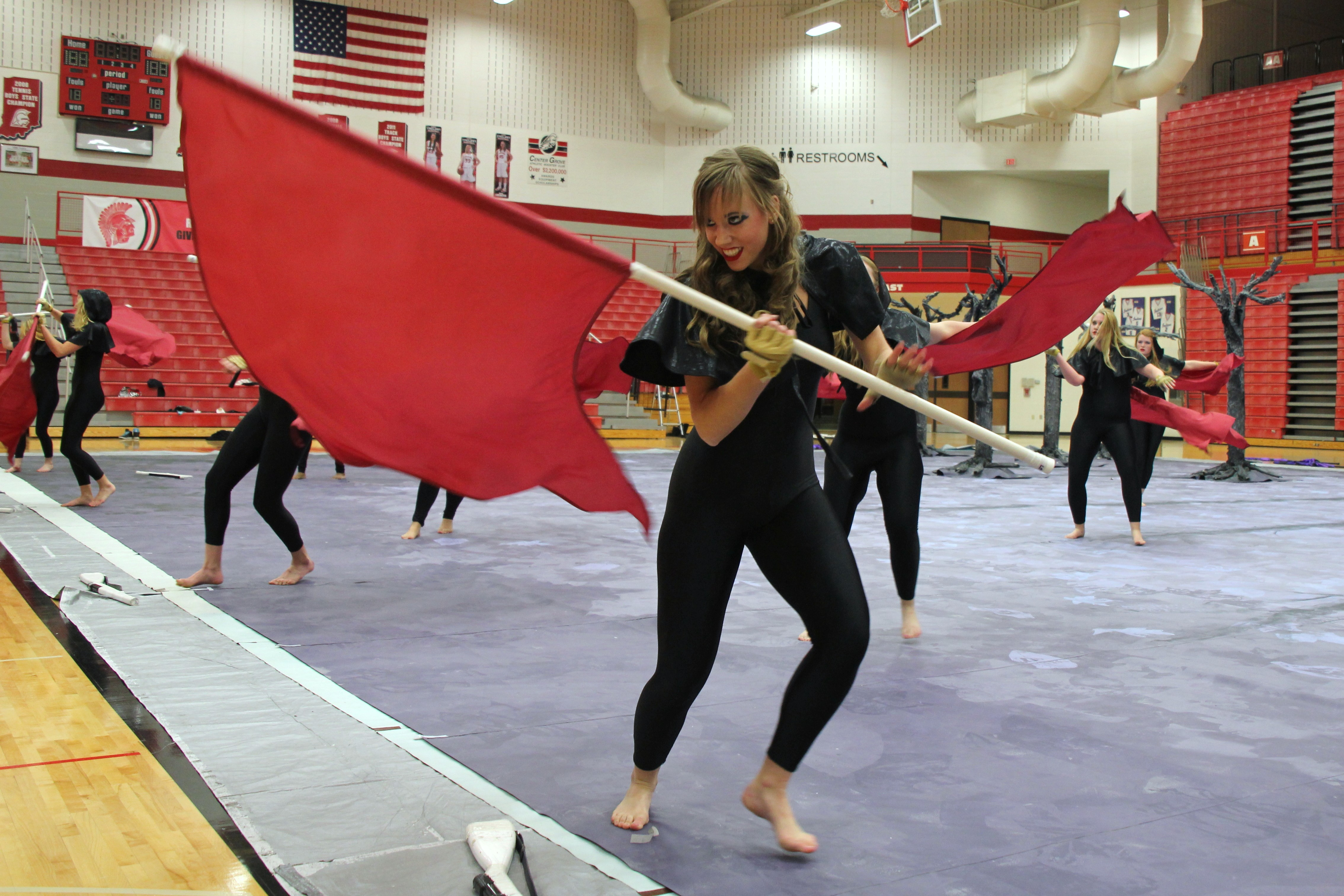
Winter guard show at Center Grove High School in Greenwood, Indiana, 2012

Winter guard is similar to outdoor color guard (marched with a drum corps or marching band), except the performances are indoors on gymnasium floors through the winter season, and the marching band does not normally perform with the winterguard. The traditional marching band music heard during fall season is replaced with a recording of various musical genres, but sometimes the color guard will just find (a) song(s) to perform to. A common theme in many shows is loss or something that conveys great emotion. The gymnasium floor typically is covered by an individually designed tarp (called a floor mat or floor by members) that generally reflects the show being performed on it. Occasionally the floor only acts as a backdrop so that the audience is drawn towards what the members are doing. The members may perform barefoot, but wearing jazz shoes or modern dance shoes is also common.

WGI frequently partners with companies that provide services and products to competing groups, as well as leading educators in other fields to highlight the activity. The organization is promoted using the tagline "Sport of the Arts". There are different types of membership fees that must be paid in order to be a part of WGI, or winter guard (or color guard) in general. Possible scholarships are given out to hardworking performers.

There are several winter guard circuits for participating in competitions during the indoor season, including TIA (Tournament Indoor Association), MAIN (Mid-Atlantic Indoor Network), AIA (Atlantic Indoor Association), WGI (Winter Guard International), and many more.

=== Winter Guard International ===
Winter Guard International, known as WGI "Sport of the Arts", in which teams of highly skilled individuals work to create and perform complex sequences of dance, music, and use of special equipment, such as sabres, rifles, and flags, to compete by division. This organization refers to winter guard as the "Sport of the Arts" due to the equally athletic and artistic nature of the activity. Co-founded in 1977 by six people, the goal of WGI was to organize and standardize the activity by creating skill levels, scoring systems, venues, and competitions.

Groups participating in WGIs event are placed into one of eight categories: Middle School, Regional A, Scholastic A, Independent A, Scholastic Open, Independent Open, Scholastic World, or Independent World. WGI hosts many regional competitions which lead up to the World Championships, a three-day event in which hundreds of winter guard groups come together to compete. WGI Championships is held in Dayton, Ohio.

=== Adjudication ===
The judging community is a body of professionals who are working to perpetuate the unique experience WGI Sport of the Arts offers. Many are professionally trained in music, dance and theatre and use that knowledge to enhance the performances through one on one critique meetings after performances. Judges applying for WGI approval must complete a home study process, the Judges' Academy, trialing on guards in every class mentioned above, and participate in a continuing education program that encompasses annual study requirements and clinics. WGI judges are knowledgeable of what is expected from each of the above-mentioned classes.

== In film and television ==
""On Guard: A Story of American Youth" is 2023 documentary film directed by Allen Otto and executive produced by Jim Czarnecki. The film follows the journey of an all-female color guard team at Bel Air High School whose goal is to qualify for the 2020 WGI World Championships, which were ultimately canceled due to the COVID-19 pandemic, with a performance dedicated to the victims of the 2019 El Paso Shooting.

Contemporary Color is a 2016 documentary film directed by Turner Ross and Bill Ross IV. The film was produced as a collaboration between David Byrne, Michael Gottwald, Dan Janvey and Josh Penn.

Color guard members from groups including The Blue Devils, Santa Clara Vanguard, Fantasia, and Diamante were featured on the television show Glee during two musical numbers – Hold It Against Me and Celebrity Skin.

== See also ==
- Bands of America
- Drum Corps International
- Winter Guard International
- Majorettes
