= Jay Bocook =

American composer

Jay Bocook is a professional composer and arranger, and also the Director of Athletic Bands at Furman University in Greenville, South Carolina. He was born in Clearwater, Florida in 1953 and received a Bachelor of Music degree from Furman University in 1975, and went on to receive a Master of Music degree from University of Louisiana at Monroe, (formerly Northeast Louisiana University). He is an alumnus of Phi Mu Alpha Sinfonia, the national men's music fraternity. Bocook became a Sinfonian at Furman University, joining the Gamma Eta chapter of Phi Mu Alpha Sinfonia in 1972. He was also inducted into the Theta Lambda chapter of Sigma Alpha Iota as a National Arts Associate in 2006.

Mr. Bocook began his composing and arranging career in graduate school, and began to write for Jenson publications while serving as the band director at a small but well-known high school in Travelers Rest, South Carolina, leading them to become the South Carolina AAA state marching band champions in 1978. Mr. Bocook also arranged the well-known piece known as “Away” for the drum and bugle corps Blue Knights. Bocook became brass arranger for The Cavaliers drum and bugle corps beginning with the 2025 competitive season. He served as the Director of Bands at Furman University from 1982 until 1989, where he continued his rise to fame as an arranger. His arrangements were featured at the 1984, 1988, 1996, and 2002 Olympic Games. He writes for a wide range of ensembles, from elementary bands to the United States Marine Band. He was recently inducted in the American Bandmasters Association (ABA), and in 2009, was inducted into the Drum Corps International (DCI) Hall of Fame. He is also a member of the (SCBDA) South Carolina Band Directors Association Hall of Fame.

In addition to serving as Furman's Director of Athletic Bands, Mr. Bocook works as a staff composer/arranger for Hal Leonard. He served as the chief arranger for the ten-time DCI World Champion Cadets Drum and Bugle Corps from 1993 until their final season in 2023, and has served in a similar role with the perennial DCI Finalist Blue Knights Drum and Bugle Corps from Denver, Colorado. Other groups include the fifteen-time DCA World Champion, the Reading Buccaneers Drum and Bugle Corps. He also composes music exclusively for a select group of high schools, namely the Avon High School Marching Band of Avon, IN, three time Grand National Champions and 9 time ISSMA State Champions. From 2005 to 2011, Mr. Bocook served as a director, composer and conductor of the Carolina Pops Orchestra.
