= Don't Speak =

1996 single by No Doubt

- Artwork for non-American commercial releases

Single by No Doubt

from the album Tragic Kingdom
- B-side: "Hey You!" (acoustic version); "Greener Pastures"
- Released: November 8, 1996
- Genre: Alternative rock
- Length: 4:24
- Label: Interscope
- Songwriters: Gwen Stefani; Eric Stefani
- Producer: Matthew Wilder

No Doubt singles chronology
"Spiderwebs" (1996)	"Don't Speak" (1996)	"Sunday Morning" (1997)

Music video
- "Don't Speak" on YouTube

"Don't Speak" is a song by American rock band No Doubt, featured on their third studio album, Tragic Kingdom (1995). Released in Europe in November 1996 by Interscope Records, the song was written by lead singer Gwen Stefani, and former band member Eric Stefani. The song was initially written as a love song, but after several revisions, Gwen reworked the lyrics into a breakup song to reflect on the end of her seven-year relationship with bandmate Tony Kanal.

"Don't Speak" topped the Billboard Hot 100 Airplay chart for 16 weeks, but did not appear on the Billboard Hot 100, which at the time excluded songs that were not issued in the US as a physical single. Outside the United States, the song topped the charts in at least 16 countries, becoming No Doubt's most successful international single. "Don't Speak" was nominated for Song of the Year and Best Pop Performance by a Duo or Group with Vocals at the 40th Grammy Awards.

"Don't Speak" was ranked at number 495 on Blender magazine's "The 500 Greatest Songs Since You Were Born". The song is a playable track in the video games Band Hero (2009), Rock Band 2 (2008), and Guitar Hero III (2007). The song has been sampled by multiple hip hop artists, including in Rakim's song "Dedicated" and Ice Cube's "War & Peace".

== Background and composition ==
"Don't Speak" is an alternative rock power ballad written by lead singer Gwen Stefani and her brother Eric Stefani, and produced by Matthew Wilder. It was originally a love song, but Stefani rewrote the lyrics almost completely after her breakup with the band's bass player Tony Kanal. According to her, "It used to be more upbeat, more of a Seventies rock-type thing. [When] Tony and I broke up... it turned into a sad song." The opening chords are reminiscent of the intro to the 1979 pop hit "Breakfast in America" by the British rock band Supertramp. A live version that exists from April 1994 shows off a bouncy tune that has the same base as the released version, but not the same urgency. The band performed part of the original song on VH1 Storytellers on August 10, 2000.

The band's lead guitarist Tom Dumont said about the song's composition:

There's a lot of stories about that song, because that one unfolded over a longer period of time. Originally, Gwen's brother wrote most of that song, and then after we got at it as a band, Gwen changed the lyrics around to fit her life. Musically, we brought it to another level, but near the end we reworded it. There's an earlier version of the song where the verses are totally different, which is a really beautiful version and it's awesome but it's way more jazzy and really different. That song had a long incubation process.

The final version of the song is written in F minor. A demo version also appeared on a demo CD, which was presented to Interscope Records prior to the release of Tragic Kingdom.

== Critical reception ==
British magazine Music Week rated the song three out of five, writing that "this Californian quartet sound more like Swedish Eurovision hopefuls on this debut UK offering but, if radio bites, it could be a smash."

== Chart performance ==
Upon release, "Don't Speak" immediately began to receive extensive airplay and it eventually became the most widely played song on American radio in 1996. It reached number one on Billboard's Hot 100 Airplay chart and maintained that position for 16 non-consecutive weeks, a record at the time. Despite its copious airplay, "Don't Speak" was not allowed to chart on the Billboard Hot 100 since no commercial single was released for it in the United States (a requirement for charting purposes at the time). Slate magazine music critic Chris Molanphy has stated that if the song had been eligible to chart, it almost certainly would have claimed the number one spot. An import CD did sell in the US, but this format was not allowed to chart either.

On other Billboard charts, "Don't Speak" stayed at number two on Modern Rock Tracks chart for five consecutive weeks. The song also proved to be a crossover hit, reaching number one on the Adult Top 40 chart for 15 consecutive weeks as well as numbers six and nine on the Adult Contemporary and Rhythmic Top 40 charts, respectively. It was ultimately placed at number one on the Hot 100 Airplay year-end chart of 1997.

Internationally, "Don't Speak" was also very successful. In February 1997, it peaked at number one in both the United Kingdom and Ireland for three weeks. Elsewhere in Europe, "Don't Speak" reached the top position in Belgium, Israel, the Netherlands, Norway, Sweden and Switzerland. Australia was another major music market where the song received widespread airplay, debuting at number one and maintaining the peak position for eight weeks.

== Music video ==
The video was directed by Sophie Muller and it is the first of the long-time collaboration between the band and the director. Before the music starts, at the beginning of the music video, there is a scene of Kanal picking a rotten orange from a tree (these scenes are usually cut out when VH1 airs this video). The majority of the video for "Don't Speak" takes place on Stage 2 at Mack Sennett Studios in Silver Lake as the band plays. Other scenes tell the story of how the media mainly focused on Stefani while the band was always in the background. The second half of the video features snippets of live footage filmed during the band's performance with Dog Eat Dog and Goldfinger at the Roseland Ballroom in New York City on August 21, 1996. The video also features clips of Dumont playing together with Foo Fighters guitarist Pat Smear. The video ends with Kanal replacing the orange in the tree, which is actually footage of Kanal in reverse pulling the orange off.

Tensions in the band had been running high and they reportedly were on the verge of breaking up the day before they were scheduled to film the video. They decided to go ahead and film it as a form of "therapy".

The video won the award for Best Group Video and was nominated for Video of the Year at the 1997 MTV Video Music Awards. It has one billion views on YouTube as of May 2023, and 700 million of the views come from 2016, 2017, 2018 and 2019 alone. The video, now remastered in 4K, was uploaded on October 7, 2009.

There is an alternate version of the video showing just the live performance part. Both versions of the video are included on the DVD release The Videos 1992–2003 (2004).

== Track listings ==
Australian, Japanese, and UK CD single

1. "Don't Speak" – 4:23
2. "Don't Speak" (alternate version) – 4:23 (*)
3. "Hey You" (acoustic version) – 3:27 (*)
4. "Greener Pastures" (from The Beacon Street Collection album) – 5:05

European CD single; UK 7-inch and cassette single

1. "Don't Speak" – 4:23
2. "Greener Pastures" (from The Beacon Street Collection album) – 5:05

(*) Recorded at York Street Studios, Auckland, New Zealand, in September 1996.

== Charts ==
=== Weekly charts ===
1996–1997 weekly chart performance for "Don't Speak"
Chart (1996–1997)	Peak position
Australia (ARIA)	1
Austria (Ö3 Austria Top 40)	2
Belgium (Ultratop 50 Flanders)	1
Belgium (Ultratop 50 Wallonia)	2
Canada Top Singles (RPM)	1
Canada Adult Contemporary (RPM)	7
Canada Rock/Alternative (RPM)	4
Denmark (IFPI)	1
Estonia Airplay (Eesti Top 15)	1
Europe (Eurochart Hot 100)	1
Finland (Suomen virallinen lista)	4
France (SNEP)	4
Germany (GfK)	2
Hungary (Mahasz)	1
Iceland (Íslenski Listinn Topp 40)	1
Ireland (IRMA)	1
Israel (Israeli Singles Chart)	1
Italy (Musica e dischi)	11
Italy Airplay (Music & Media)	1
Lithuania (M-1)	1
Mexico (Notitas Musicales)	1
Netherlands (Dutch Top 40)	1
Netherlands (Single Top 100)	1
New Zealand (Recorded Music NZ)	1
Norway (VG-lista)	1
Romania (Romanian Top 100)	1
Scottish Singles Sales (Official Charts)	1
Spain (AFYVE)	2
Sweden (Sverigetopplistan)	1
Switzerland (Schweizer Hitparade)	1
UK Singles (Official Charts)	1
US Adult Alternative Airplay (Billboard)	12
US Adult Contemporary (Billboard)	6
US Adult Pop Airplay (Billboard)	1
US Alternative Airplay (Billboard)	2
US Pop Airplay (Billboard)	1
US Radio Songs (Billboard)	1
US Rhythmic Airplay (Billboard)	9

2023–2026 weekly chart performance for "Don't Speak"
Chart (2023–2026)	Peak position
Greece International (IFPI)	65
Kazakhstan Airplay (TopHit)	85
Lithuania (AGATA)	58
Poland (Polish Airplay Top 100)	83

=== Year-end charts ===
1996 year-end chart performance for "Don't Speak"
Chart (1996)	Position
Israel (Israeli Singles Chart)	6
Norway (VG-lista)	13
Sweden (Topplistan)	16
US Modern Rock Tracks (Billboard)	81

1997 year-end chart performance for "Don't Speak"
Chart (1997)	Position
Australia (ARIA)	8
Austria (Ö3 Austria Top 40)	5
Belgium (Ultratop 50 Flanders)	10
Belgium (Ultratop 50 Wallonia)	7
Brazil Airplay (Crowley)	11
Canada Top Singles (RPM)	11
Canada Adult Contemporary (RPM)	43
Europe (Eurochart Hot 100)	3
France (SNEP)	18
Germany (Media Control)	6
Iceland (Íslenski Listinn Topp 40)	13
Netherlands (Dutch Top 40)	6
Netherlands (Single Top 100)	22
New Zealand (RIANZ)	30
Norway (VG-lista)	4
Romania (Romanian Top 100)	2
Sweden (Topplistan)	57
Switzerland (Schweizer Hitparade)	5
UK Singles (OCC)	7
US Adult Contemporary (Billboard)	26
US Adult Top 40 (Billboard)	5
US Hot 100 Airplay (Billboard)	1
US Modern Rock Tracks (Billboard)	33
US Rhythmic Top 40 (Billboard)	30
US Top 40/Mainstream (Billboard)	1

2024 year-end chart performance for "Don't Speak"
Chart (2024)	Position
Kazakhstan Airplay (TopHit)	192

=== Decade-end charts ===
Decade-end chart performance for "Don't Speak"
Chart (1990–1999)	Position
Belgium (Ultratop 50 Flanders)	46
Netherlands (Dutch Top 40)	16

=== All-time charts ===
All-time chart performance for "Don't Speak"
Chart	Position
UK Singles (OCC)	159

== Certifications ==
Certifications and sales for "Don't Speak"
Region	Certification	Certified units/sales
Australia (ARIA)	2× Platinum	140,000^{^}
Austria (IFPI Austria)	Gold	25,000^{*}
Belgium (BRMA)	Platinum	50,000^{*}
Denmark (IFPI Danmark)	Gold	45,000^{‡}
France (SNEP)	Gold	250,000^{*}
Germany (BVMI)	Platinum	500,000^{^}
Italy (FIMI)	Gold	25,000^{‡}
New Zealand (RMNZ)	3× Platinum	90,000^{‡}
Netherlands (NVPI)	Gold	50,000^{^}
Norway (IFPI Norway)	2× Platinum	
Sweden (GLF)	Gold	25,000^{^}
Switzerland (IFPI Switzerland)	Platinum	50,000^{^}
United Kingdom (BPI)	3× Platinum	1,800,000^{‡}
United States (RIAA)	3× Platinum	3,000,000^{‡}
Streaming
Greece (IFPI Greece)	Platinum	2,000,000^{†}
^{*} Sales figures based on certification alone.^{^} Shipments figures based on certification alone.^{‡} Sales+streaming figures based on certification alone.^{†} Streaming-only figures based on certification alone.

== Release history ==
Release dates and formats for "Don't Speak"
Region	Date	Format(s)	Label(s)	Ref.
United States	1996	Radio	Interscope; Trauma	
Europe	November 8, 1996	CD	Interscope; Trauma; MCA	
United Kingdom	February 10, 1997	7-inch vinyl; CD; cassette	Interscope; Trauma; MCA	
Japan	February 21, 1997	CD	Interscope; MCA	

== Cover versions ==
- Niamh Perry covered the song during her time on I'd Do Anything in 2008.
- In 2012, it was covered by various members of the Glee cast for the episode "The Break Up" before subsequently being released as a single.
- Leela James covered the song on her album A Change Is Gonna Come.
- In 2013, Jiordan Tolli performed the song on the fifth season of The X Factor Australia during week six. Her performance gained positive feedback from the judges.
- Carly Rae Jepsen released a cover of the song recorded live at Electric Lady Studios in New York City as one of her Spotify Singles.
- New Years Day released a cover of the song as a part of their 2018 EP Diary of a Creep.
- In October 2020, Stefani performed a "countrified version" of the song as part of a skit on The Tonight Show Starring Jimmy Fallon where Fallon portrayed the character Buck Pinto promoting a fictitious album Gwen's Gone Country.
- In September 2021, Scott Bradlee's Postmodern Jukebox released "a '60s orchestral pop style remake" of "Don't Speak" featuring Haley Reinhart on vocals. As of July 2024, it has 8 million views on YouTube.
- In 2022, Japanese rock band Coldrain released a cover of "Don't Speak" on their seventh studio album Nonnegative.
- Indoor percussion ensemble Rhythm X performed an arrangement of "Don't Speak" as part of their 2023 bronze medal show The Unspoken.
- In 2025 Nothing but Thieves performed the song on some shows.
