= Bel Air High School =

Bel Air High School can refer to:

- Bel Air High School (Bel Air, Maryland)
- Bel Air High School (El Paso, Texas)

== See also ==
- Bellaire High School (disambiguation)
- Belaire High School, Baton Rouge, Louisiana
