= John Overton High School =

Location
- 4820 Franklin Road; Nashville, Tennessee 37220; United States; 36.079206°N 86.769499°W

Information
- Type: Comprehensive High School
- Established: September 1958
- School district: Metro Nashville Public Schools
- Principal: Dr. Kelby Garner
- Teaching staff: 107.56 (FTE)
- Grades: 9–12
- Enrollment: 1,969 (2023–2024)
- Student to teacher ratio: 18.31
- Colors: White, red, and black
- Mascot: Bobcat
- Rival: Antioch High
- Yearbook: The Overtour
- Website: MNPS JOHS

John Overton High School (commonly Overton, John Overton, Johnny O or JOHS) is a public high school located in Nashville, Tennessee. It is named after prominent Judge John Overton (1766–1833), advisor to President Andrew Jackson. The school opened in September 1958 and was renovated and expanded in 1995. The school most recently underwent a US$30,000,000.00 renovation, approved for FY 2015–2016, which strategically expanded school classrooms and other spaces. The school has won 14 state championships.

== Academics and demographics ==
The school has a graduation rate of 82%, slightly above the national average.

Overton is a school of expanding academic courses. Numerous honors and Advanced Placement (AP) courses are offered at Overton. Recent AP class offerings were available in Calculus (AB), Biology, Art History, Music Theory, English Language, English Literature, World History, US History, European History, US Government, and Macroeconomics.

According to U.S. News & World Report, in 2014 the school possessed a 20:1 student teacher ratio with 1,868 students and 92 teachers. Sixty-three percent of students were classified as "minority" and sixty-five percent were considered "economically disadvantaged". It is the most diverse high school in the state. Many students are of Kurdish descent, with a proposal in 2019 about adding Kurdish language classes. Fifty-one percent of students were considered proficient in English and thirty percent proficient in algebra. These numbers are compared with the district average of fifty-six percent and forty-five percent, respectively.

== Extracurricular activities ==
Overton has a number of athletic programs. Currently, there is a baseball, boys' and girls' basketball, bowling, cheerleading, cross country, football, golf, boys' and girls' soccer, softball, tennis, track, volleyball, and wrestling team.

The clubs and organizations offered consist of band, Beta Club, Business Professionals of America, cheerleading, choir, drama, FCCLA (Family, Career & Community Leaders of America), Fellowship of Christian Athletes, forensics (speech and debate), guitar, Interact Club, National Honor Society, The Overtour (yearbook), The Orbit (newspaper), orchestra, piano, Student Council, Students Taking a Right Stand (STARS), The VEX Robotics Team (VEX Robotics Competition), and TSA (Technology Student Association).

=== Band ===
The Awesome John Overton Band most recently won the 2008 state championship

Overton is well known in the state for its marching band. The band won the Tennessee Governor's Cup six times, in 1983, 1984, 1985, 1986, 1992, and 2008. At the annual Contest of Champions competition in Murfreesboro, the band had been a finalist for 26 consecutive years (1981–2006). In addition, they have made numerous appearances in the finals of various Bands of America Regional competitions. The band has also performed in the Macy's Thanksgiving Day Parade (1990), Tournament of Roses Parade (1987), Fiesta Bowl Parade (1984 and 1992), and was selected to commemorate the 60th and 65th anniversaries of the Bombing of Pearl Harbor, Hawaii in 2001 and 2006. The school has three WGI world championships, beginning when the Winter Guard won the 1994 Scholastic A World Champions and 1995 Scholastic Open World Champions while the Winter Drumline won the 1996 Scholastic Marching Percussion AA World Championship. Overton was honored by the Grammy Foundation as a 1999 Grammy Signature School Gold school. Overton was awarded the John Philip Sousa Foundation Sudler Shield for outstanding marching band twice.

Contest of Champions Marching Band Competition
Year	Grand Champion	Reserve Grand Champion	Overton Band Directors
1982	McGavock; Tennessee Governor's Cup	John Overton	Rodney Webb and Jo Ann Hood
1983	John Overton; Tennessee Governor's Cup	North Hardin; Kentucky Governor's Cup	Rodney Webb and Jo Ann Hood
1984	North Hardin; Kentucky Governor's Cup	John Overton; Tennessee Governor's Cup	Jo Ann Hood and Rodney Webb
1985	John Overton; Tennessee Governor's Cup	North Hardin; Kentucky Governor's Cup	Rodney Webb and Jo Ann Hood
1986	North Hardin; Kentucky Governor's Cup	John Overton; Tennessee Governor's Cup	Jo Ann Hood and Rodney Webb
1987	McGavock; Tennessee Governor's Cup	John Overton	Rodney Webb and Jo Ann Hood
1988	McGavock; Tennessee Governor's Cup	John Overton	Rodney Webb and Jo Ann Hood
1992	Lafayette; Kentucky Governor's Cup	John Overton; Tennessee Governor's Cup	Jo Ann Hood and Terry Jolley
1997	McGavock; Tennessee Governor's Cup	John Overton	Jo Ann Hood and David Aydelott
2000	McGavock; Tennessee Governor's Cup	John Overton	Jo Ann Hood and David Aydelott
2008	John Overton; Tennessee Governor's Cup	Siegel	Debbie Burton and Jo Ann Hood

=== Orchestra ===
John Overton also had its share of talent in the Orchestra as well. Keller Phillips made the All-State Orchestra in 2011, making him the first orchestra student to do so in years.

=== Wrestling ===
During the 1995–1998 time frame, the Bobcat wrestlers won the State's Traditional State Tournament twice (1996 and 1997) and finished in the top six twice (sixth in 1995 and second in 1998). Moreover, the wrestling team won the Tennessee state Dual Title in 1997 with an undefeated dual record of 29–0. They finished in the top four in each of those years in the dual tournament having placed fourth in 1995, third in 1996, champion in 1997, and third in 1998. The team coached by Ralph Gabriel was also ranked in the top 14 in the USA TODAY poll. Coach Gabriel was USA Southeast Region Coach of the Year and a finalist for National Coach of the Year in 1997

During this time, the Overton wrestlers had many individual state champions and All-Americans such as Nebraska recruit, Charles McTorry, Eric and Derrick Jordan, Sacred Heart University's head coach Casey Brewster, Timothy Drinkwine, Robby Lee, William Hadden, and others. Many of these Overton graduates have gone on to pursue collegiate wrestling and coaching.

Throughout the last fifteen years, the wrestling team has been coached by Ralph Gabriel, who has taken the team to many national tournaments such as the US Open in Broken Arrow, Oklahoma, the Virginia Duals in Hampton Virginia, the Tournament of Champions in Reno, Nevada. Other tournaments attended were in New Orleans, Central Square, New York, Herndon, Virginia; and Chattanooga, Tennessee.

=== Football ===
Nick Coutras Stadium

The football team won the Tennessee state championship in 1981 with a record of 14–0, under the leadership of Coach Nick Coutras. The stadium, visible from Interstate 65, is named after Coach Coutras, who had a 145–36 record in his sixteen years at Overton. The most recent success was in 2003 when the football team advanced to the quarterfinals of the state playoffs before losing to nearby rival and eventual champion Hillsboro High School.

=== Baseball ===
Bobcat Baseball has one of the state's longest winning streaks at 40 baseball games, which was en route to a Tennessee state finals game in which they lost to Houston High School out of Memphis in 2005. The baseball team has experienced greater success, having won the Tennessee State Baseball Championship game in 1971 and 1988. The Goodpasture vs. Overton game from 1998 holds the state's record for longest game in terms of innings, at 15.

Bill Tucker Field

Baseball State Championship Games
Year	Winning Team		Losing Team		Location (all in Tennessee)	Class
1968	Franklin County	4	John Overton	1	Tullahoma	
1971	John Overton	7	Dobyns Bennett	5	Nashville	
1988	John Overton	3	Farragut	2	Greer Stadium, Nashville	AAA
2005	Houston	9	John Overton	1	Memphis	AAA

=== Basketball ===
The basketball team experienced their greatest success in the 1990s with players such as Georgia State University recruit Chris Gentry, University of Tennessee recruit and starting point guard Brandon Wharton, University of Maryland recruit Brian Watkins and other players recruited by local colleges and universities. The Basketball team finished 2nd in the state tournament in 1994 losing to state powerhouse, Science Hill High School.

=== Tennis ===
The 2012 Tennis team placed 1st in singles tennis district.

Notable players

Ruth Tan, Melissa McKinney, and Benjamin Demonbreun.

The 2013 Boys' Tennis team placed 1st in Districts. The 2014 Boys' Tennis team placed 1st in Districts. The 2015 Girls' Tennis Team placed 1st in Districts.

Notable Players

Benjamin Demonbreun, Connor Ulrey, Neal Phillips, Onyedika Molokwu, Roland Phan, Aemron Yosuf, Kendrick Kronthal, Amos Tan, Ruth Tan, and Melissa McKinney.

=== Other activities ===
State championships have been won in several other sports. The boys' golf team won the state championship in 1977. The girls' track and field team won the championship in 1985 and hold records as 400 meter relay champions for 1981, 1985, 1988 and winner of the 1600 meter relay in 1991. The boys' track and field team won the championship in 1990 and hold records as mile relay champions in 1975 and winner of the 400 meter relay in 1982. In forensics, the school won the Senator Karl E. Mundt Congress Trophy in the 1977 NFL National Tournament.

== Notable alumni ==
Mookie Betts, baseball player from class of 2011. He was taken in the fifth round of the 2011 draft by the Boston Red Sox and listed in 2014 among the top prospects in baseball by Baseball America and MLB.com. In 2018, he became the only player in American League history to win the World Series, a Gold Glove award, a Silver Slugger award, and the MVP in the same season.

Hank Williams Jr. Country singer-songwriter, son of Hank Williams.

Chris DuBois - Songwriter, Producer

Ugo Amadi - Football Player

Pam Tillis - Singer, Songwriter

Sam Ewing, baseball player from class of 1966. He played for the Chicago White Sox (1973, 1976), Toronto Blue Jays (1977–1978), and the Japanese Nippon-Ham Fighters (1979). Awarded a baseball scholarship to the University of Tennessee Volunteers (fall 1967 thru spring 1970), Sam batted .411 for his career and .464 his junior year, holding the #2 all time Southeastern Conference batting average.

Jeff Gooch, football player from class of 1992. He was a linebacker for the Tampa Bay Buccaneers (1996–2001, 2004–2005) and Detroit Lions (2002–2003). He was inducted into the Austin Peay Athletic Hall of Fame in 2002.

Charles Holliday, Jr., football captain from class of 1966. He is former chairman and CEO of DuPont. He was inducted into the Metro Nashville Public Schools Hall of Fame in 2006.

John Mitchell, baseball player from class of 1983. He pitched for the New York Mets (1986–1989) and Baltimore Orioles (1990). He was inducted into the Metro Nashville Public Schools Sports Hall of Fame in 2008.
