= Rhythm X =

Indoor percussion ensemble based in Dayton, Ohio

Rhythm X, Inc.
- Formation: 2001
- Founder: Craig Dunn
- Type: Non-Profit Organization
- Location: Franklin, IN
- President & Chairman: Devon Bergman
- Executive Director: Abby Hermesch
- Program Director: Tim Jackson
- Affiliations: Winter Guard International Indiana Percussion Association
- Staff: 30
- Volunteers: 30-50
- Website: rhythmx.org
- Formerly called: Rhythm X Performance Ensemble

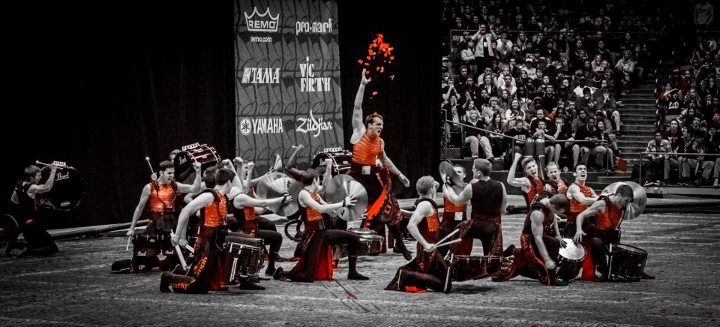
Rhythm X performing their 1st place 2013 show, The Man in the Arena inspired by a speech by Theodore Roosevelt.

Rhythm X, Inc. is a non-profit music education organization that operates a competitive indoor percussion ensemble, as well as an online school for marching music called The X Academy. The company was founded in 2002 by Craig Dunn as the Rhythm X Performance Ensemble. The ensembles compete in both the Winter Guard International (WGI) and Indiana Percussion Association (IPA) circuits in the World Class, which is the classification given to the ensembles that execute musical and visual programs of the highest difficulty. In 2013, Rhythm X announced the launch of The X Academy, an online and in-person educational program suited for high school and college-age musicians interested in competitive percussion and wind ensembles. Later that year the organization announced the addition of its newest ensemble that would compete in the new WGI Winds Division in 2015. Rhythm X Winds was operational until their last season in 2020, when they were forced to disband due to financial struggles caused by the COVID-19 pandemic.

Rhythm X was the 2008, 2009, 2013, and 2026 WGI World Champion in Percussion Independent World (PIW) Class and is known to indoor marching percussion fans and participants around the world as one of the most highly skilled competitors. The percussion ensemble has also gained a reputation for presenting some of the most innovative content at each WGI Percussion World Championship, and is a usual crowd favorite every year.

== History ==
Rhythm X was founded in 2001 by Craig Dunn and was initially intended to provide a competitive percussion performance experience for young musicians in Ohio. The unit was immediately successful, as it captured the gold medal in its inaugural season in Percussion Independent Open class at the 2002 WGI World Championships. Rhythm X has been classified as Percussion Independent World every season since then.

As Rhythm X's successes have continued, the membership has expanded beyond local Ohio students. Several hours of transportation is typical, but members have commuted as far as twelve hours one way every weekend to participate. Others move to Ohio for the season's duration. In its early years, the ensemble had a mixture of high school and college students, but the current membership contains almost exclusively college students. Most of the members also have experience in World Class Drum Corps International drum and bugle corps.

In 2007, Rhythm X became the first independent Winter Guard International percussion ensemble to conduct a tour of Europe. The members and staff performed and offered clinics in England, France, and Belgium using their 2007 show "Behind the Velvet Rope" as a demonstration.

In 2008, Craig Dunn announced that Andrew Markworth would be overtaking the role of Ensemble Director for Rhythm X, while Dunn would continue with some duties as executive director.

In 2009, Rhythm X announced its sponsorship of a newly formed percussion ensemble in the Netherlands called European X. Head staff members Craig Dunn, Tim Fairbanks, Andrew Markworth, and Tim Jackson periodically visit them to assist with their shows' designs and their members' educations.

In 2010, Rhythm X announced that Tim Jackson would be assuming the role of Ensemble Director for the group.

In 2012, in preparation for the coming 2013 season the Rhythm X staff was slightly restructured. Tim Fairbanks assumed the role of Ensemble Director and a new position was added. Mike Scott joined the administrative team as Operations Director. In 2013 Rhythm X also launched a new website, e-commerce store, and a staff blog.

== WGI World Championship Results ==
Rhythm X has maintained consistent competitive success at WGI World Championships and has been a finalist every year since its inception. The unit has been awarded 4 PIW gold medals, 8 PIW silver medals, 3 PIW bronze medals, and 1 PIO gold medal.

Gold background indicates WGI Championship; Silver background indicates WGI silver medal, Bronze background indicates WGI Bronze medal pale blue background indicates WGI Class Finalist; pale green background indicates WGI semifinalist

Year	Program Title	Placement	Score	Class
2002	Our World	1st	96.150	PIO
2003	Picture This	7th	88.200	PIW
2004	AudioVisual	3rd	93.250	PIW
2005	Wired	2nd	96.700	PIW
2006	Lunaria	2nd	95.750	PIW
2007	Behind the Velvet Rope	6th	92.200	PIW
2008	Gone	1st	96.900	PIW
2009	Touch	1st	97.263	PIW
2010	Inspired	2nd	96.250	PIW
2011	St& By Me	4th	94.225	PIW
2012	enLIGHTened	4th	94.125	PIW
2013	The Man in the Arena	1st	98.263*	PIW
2014	The Razor's Edge	3rd	96.113	PIW
2015	When One Door Closes	2nd	96.950	PIW
2016	The Alpha	4th	95.963	PIW
2017	Looking Back	6th	94.225	PIW
2018	All The World's A Stage	2nd	97.513	PIW
2019	Alinea	4th	97.225	PIW
2020	Parabellum	1st*	85.850*	PIW
2022	Art Shaped Box	2nd	98.075	PIW
2023	The Unspoken	3rd	97.088	PIW
2024	Blackbird	2nd	98.400	PIW
2025	Hands of the Creation	2nd	99.063	PIW
2026	The End.	1st	99.300	PIW

- Score taken from final WGI show before the remainder of the season was cancelled due to the COVID-19 Pandemic.
- Rhythm X did not field an ensemble in 2021.

== WGI World Winds Division ==
Rhythm X has maintained consistent competitive success at WGI World Championships and has been a finalist every year since its inception. The unit has been awarded 4 WIW gold medals, and 1 WIW silver medal.

Gold background indicates WGI Championship; Silver background indicates WGI silver medal, Bronze background indicates WGI Bronze medal pale blue background indicates WGI Class Finalist

Year	Program Title	Placement	Score	Class
2015	Uncharted Territory	1st	94.125	WIW
2016	Aurora	2nd	96.375	WIW
2017	Jumping Through Loops	1st	96.750	WIW
2018	With A Twist	1st	97.475	WIW
2019	A Day In The Life	1st	96.600	WIW
2020	The Devils Breath	1st*	83.750*	WIW

- Score taken from final WGI show before the remainder of the season was cancelled due to the COVID-19 Pandemic.
- Rhythm X Winds did not field an ensemble in 2021 or 2022.

== Achievements ==
- The highest-scoring WGI PIW performance at World Championships is held by Rhythm X's 2026 show "The End." with a score of 99.300.
- Rhythm X is one of only 7 ensembles to ever win the PIW gold medal at WGI World Championships.
- During the 2007 season, Rhythm X became the first independent WGI indoor percussion ensemble to ever tour Europe.
- Rhythm X and the Blue Knights Percussion Ensemble are tied for the second-most consecutive WGI PIW gold medals.
