= Blake Fisher =

American football player (born 2003)

No. 57 – Houston Texans
- Position: Offensive tackle
- Roster status: Active

Personal information
- Born: March 25, 2003 (age 23); Avon, Indiana, U.S.
- Listed height: 6 ft 6 in (1.98 m)
- Listed weight: 312 lb (142 kg)

Career information
- High school: Avon
- College: Notre Dame (2021–2023)
- NFL draft: 2024: 2nd round, 59th overall pick

Career history
- Houston Texans (2024–present)

Career NFL statistics as of Week 17, 2025
- Games played: 30
- Games started: 15
- Stats at Pro Football Reference

Blake Ashton Fisher (born March 25, 2003) is an American professional football offensive tackle for the Houston Texans of the National Football League (NFL). He played college football for the Notre Dame Fighting Irish.

== Early life ==
Fisher attended and played high school football at Avon High School in Avon, Indiana. After his senior season, he was named Mr. Football Indiana for offensive line and earned IFCA First Team All-State. Fisher committed to the University of Notre Dame to play college football.

== College career ==
As a true freshman at Notre Dame in 2021, Fisher won the starting left tackle position. He went down with a knee injury in the first game of the season against Florida State and returned at the end of the season for the bowl game. In 2022, Fisher started all 13 games at right tackle.

== Professional career ==
Pre-draft measurables
| Height | Weight | Arm length | Hand span | Wingspan | 40-yard dash | 10-yard split | 20-yard split | 20-yard shuttle | Three-cone drill | Vertical jump | Broad jump | Bench press |
|---|---|---|---|---|---|---|---|---|---|---|---|---|
| 6 ft 5 3/4 in (1.97 m) | 310 lb (141 kg) | 34 3/8 in (0.87 m) | 10 in (0.25 m) | 6 ft 11 in (2.11 m) | 5.20 s | 1.82 s | 3.00 s | 4.73 s | 7.76 s | 28.0 in (0.71 m) | 9 ft 6 in (2.90 m) | 22 reps |
All values from NFL Combine/Pro Day

Fisher was selected by the Houston Texans with the 59th pick in the second round of the 2024 NFL draft.
