= Willarda V. Edwards =

American physician and lecturer

Willarda V. Edwards is an American physician and lecturer.

Edwards became interested in medicine as a child. When Edwards was a teenager, she lost her 15-month-old sister due to sickle cell disease. She served as the class secretary in her senior year in high school at Bel Air High School in El Paso, Texas. She earned her bachelor's degree in biology in 1972 from the University of Texas at El Paso (UTEP). In 1977 she earned a medical degree from University of Maryland School of Medicine. Edwards also served in the U.S. Navy at the Bethesda Naval Hospital.

In 1984, she got into private practice. She served as the first African-American woman president of the Baltimore Medical Society in 1995.

Edwards worked as the NAACP national health advocacy director until July 2004 and worked on the "Call to Action on Health" which focused on disparities among minority groups with healthcare in the United States. Edwards was also the president of the Sickle Cell Disease Association of America in 2004. In 2009, she became president of the National Medical Association (NMA).

Edwards currently serves on the American Medical Association (AMA) board where she has addressed racism as a threat to public health.
