= Bellaire High School =

Bellaire High School may refer to:

- Bellaire High School (Michigan)
- Bellaire High School (Ohio), Bellaire, Ohio
- Bellaire High School (Texas), Bellaire, Texas (Houston metropolitan area)

== See also ==
- Bel Air High School (disambiguation)
- Belaire High School, Baton Rouge, Louisiana
