= Avon High School (Indiana) =

Location
- 7575 East County Road 150 South; Avon, Indiana 46123; United States; 39°44′20″N 86°23′17″W

Information
- Type: Public high school
- School district: Avon Community School Corporation
- Superintendent: Scott Wyndham
- Principal: Matthew Shockley
- Teaching staff: 190.50 (on a FTE basis)
- Grades: 9-12
- Enrollment: 3,523 (2024-2025)
- Student to teacher ratio: 18.49
- Colors: Black and gold
- Athletics conference: Hoosier Crossroads Conference
- Nickname: Orioles
- Rivals: Brownsburg High School
- Publication: The Oriole Report
- Newspaper: The Avon Echo
- Website: ahs.avon-schools.org

Avon High School (AHS) is a 4-year public high school in Avon, Hendricks County, Indiana. It is a part of the Avon Community School Corporation, whose district services the vast majority of Avon and portions of Danville and Plainfield.

The school partners with the Area 31 Career Center to provide career and technical education (CTE) to 11th and 12th students enrolled at AHS. Avon High School also offers Avon Academy and Avon Online, alternative learning schools for students in the AHS district.

AHS was a 2023 National Blue Ribbon School.

== Demographics ==
The demographic breakdown of the 3,523 students enrolled for the 2024–2025 school year was:

- Male - 51.3%
- Female - 48.7%
- Native American/Alaskan - 0.1%
- Asian - 5.7%
- Native Hawaiian/Pacific Islander - <0.1%
- Black - 25.8%
- Hispanic - 12.7%
- White - 49.6%
- Multiracial - 6.0%

43.0% of the students were eligible for free or reduced-cost lunch.

== Athletics ==
Avon's Orioles are members of the Hoosier Crossroads Conference. The school colors are black and gold. The following Indiana High School Athletic Association (IHSAA) sanctioned sports are offered:

- Baseball (boys)
- Basketball (girls and boys)
- Cross country (girls and boys)
- Football (boys)
- Golf (girls and boys)
  - Boys state champions - 2009
- Soccer (girls and boys)
  - Girls state champions - 2013
- Softball (girls)
  - State champions - 2016
- Swimming and diving (girls and boys)
- Tennis (girls and boys)
- Track and Field (girls and boys)
  - Boys state champions - 2018
- Unified track (coed)
- Unified flag football (coed)
- Wrestling (boys)
- Volleyball (girls)
  - State champions - 2012, 2013, 2017

== Performing arts ==
Avon High School Marching Band performing c. 2008

Avon has a marching band, concert bands, a jazz band, orchestras, choirs, show choirs, a dance team and a theatre program.

=== Marching Band ===
The marching band (Avon Marching Black and Gold) won the Indiana State School Music Association (ISSMA) state championship seven consecutive times from 2001 to 2007, and again in 2009, 2010, 2013, 2014, 2015, 2016, 2019, 2021, 2023, 2024, and 2025. In 2008, 2009, 2010, 2023, 2024, 2025 and 2026, they placed first in the Bands of America Grand National Championships. They were in the 2012 New Year's Day Rose Parade in Pasadena, California. They were invited to and performed in the 2024 Macy's Thanksgiving Day Parade in New York. They also field an indoor winds program with Winter Guard International (WGI) Scholastic World Class championship wins in 2016, 2017, and seven consecutive wins from 2021 (Note: Hosted virtually due to COVID-19.) to 2026; a drumline with WGI Percussion Scholastic World (PSW) championship wins in 2002 and 2022; and a winter guard with WGI Scholastic World Class championship wins in 2009, 2018, 2022, and 2024.

=== Concert band ===
The concert band won the ISSMA state championship in 2012, 2013, and 2016.

=== Orchestra ===
The orchestra won the ISSMA state championship in 2018, 2019, 2022 and 2025.

=== Choir ===
The treble/men's choir won the ISSMA state championship in 2018.

=== Show choir ===
The mixed show choir won the ISSMA state championship in 2025 and 2026.

=== Dance team ===
The AHS varsity dance team won the Indiana High School Dance Team Association (IHSDTA) state championship in 2025, breaking Lake Central High School's 30-year streak. The large ensemble team has also won the IHSDTA state championship six consecutive times from 2021 to 2026. AHS dance team members Amanda Zolcak, Alyssa Hartsock, and Victoria Rodkey received scholarships from IHSDTA in 2012, 2016 and 2017, respectively.

== Notable alumni ==
- Blake Fisher - NFL offensive tackle for the Houston Texans
- Isaac Guerendo - NFL running back for the San Francisco 49ers
- Brandon Peters - former NCAA D1 quarterback for University of Michigan and University of Illinois
- Patrick Rodgers - PGA Tour golfer
- Steve Talley - actor

== See also ==
- List of high schools in Indiana
