= James Forbes (basketball) =

American basketball player (1952–2022)

Personal information
- Born: July 18, 1952 Fort Rucker, Alabama, U.S.
- Died: January 21, 2022 (aged 69) El Paso, Texas, U.S.
- Listed height: 6 ft 8 in (2.03 m)
- Listed weight: 201 lb (91 kg)

Career information
- High school: Bel Air (El Paso, Texas)
- College: UTEP (1971–1974)
- NBA draft: 1974: 4th round, 70th overall pick
- Drafted by: Chicago Bulls
- Position: Power forward
- Stats at Basketball Reference
Medals
Men's basketball
Representing United States
Olympic Games
Silver medal – second place	1972 Munich	Team

James Ricardo Forbes (July 18, 1952 – January 21, 2022) was an American basketball player. His college career at the University of Texas at El Paso was crowned by his participation at the 1972 Olympics as a member of the youngest-ever U.S. team. Forbes played in the highly controversial 1972 Olympic Men's Basketball Final, which ended in a loss for his team. Protesting refereeing in that match, he and the rest of the team have never accepted the silver medal.

== Life and career ==
Forbes was born in Fort Rucker, Alabama, on July 18, 1952. He attended Bel Air High School in El Paso, Texas. He was drafted by the Chicago Bulls in the fourth round of the 1974 NBA draft, but he never played professionally. Forbes was later an assistant coach for the UTEP Miners before going to coach high school basketball in El Paso. As a high school coach, he guided the Riverside Rangers to the Texas 5A Final Four in 1995 and the Andress Eagles to the Texas 5A Sweet Sixteen in 2009. Forbes has more than 700 career high school coaching victories.

Forbes died from complications of COVID-19 in El Paso on January 21, 2022, at the age of 69.
