= Winter guard =

Indoor color guard

Winter guard (sometimes spelled "winterguard") is an indoor color guard sport and performance art derived from military ceremonies. Modern winter guard is a competitive, performance-based activity which incorporates choreographed staging, dance, and manipulation of equipment such as flags, prop rifles, and sabers (also known as "spinning"). Unlike traditional color guard, winter guard performances and contests are held indoors, usually in a gymnasium or an indoor arena. Performances typically last three to seven minutes and are generally accompanied by recorded soundtracks rather than live music. However, the use of live instrumentation (acoustic and electronic) and vocalization have grown in popularity. Winter guard is most present in the United States; independent units have also been formed in Canada, the Netherlands, the United Kingdom, and Japan. Winter guard ensembles often perform at judged competitions officiated by local and regional associations using criteria developed by Winter Guard International, host of the annual Winter Guard International World Championships in Dayton, Ohio. The World Championships event purportedly attracts in 60,000 visitors to the event annually. Scoring attempts to rank units on the repertoire and achievement of aspects of each performance such as unity, quality, range, precision, skill, design, and effect.

== Team roles ==
A winter guard generally consists of performing members under the direction of instructional staff. The staff of a winter guard team are drawn from many different specialties, which sometimes overlap: there are equipment instructors (sometimes one for the unit, sometimes broken out into the individual sections), dance instructors, and drill instructors. The equipment instructors create the choreography performed with equipment and teach it to the guard. The dance instructors create and teach the movement choreography in the show. The drill instructors focus on the position of the guard members relative to one another and to the boundaries of the performance area, in addition to where each member goes at which specific time during the performance. In some cases, all of these roles are fulfilled by one sole director.

A winter guard team usually has one or multiple captains or student leaders who serve as leaders as well as performing members. The captain may assume minor administrative duties and lead the team when instructors are not available. The captain is also the representative of the guard during awards ceremonies.

Most regional color guard circuits adopt the minimum and maximum performer requirements set by WGI, which varies by division. The Independent World classification has no maximum number of performers.

== Performance conventions ==
The duration of winter guard shows depends on the class in which the guard is performing. In competition settings, each winter guard team is allotted a set amount of time to set up staging (including a vinyl floor if the guard is using one, and any props associated with the performance), place all equipment, perform the show, and remove staging, props, and equipment. Setup and tear-down typically run two minutes each, and performances run around five minutes. Judges impose penalties on teams that run past the allotted time.

Unlike traditional color guard teams, which perform outdoors on a football field or parade route accompanied by a marching band or drum corps, winter guard teams perform indoors to recorded music.

In competitions, winter guard teams are judged in the areas of talent, precision, creativity, and horizontal orchestration (how all the elements create the larger picture/effect). Performances incorporate equipment, props, and dance moves.

Judges must keep a running commentary on a tape recorder or digital recorder. The judges record the score on a designated sheet to be reviewed by the individual guard instructor(s). After every one in a class has competed and their scores have been tallied, if the instructor(s) so choose they may meet with all the judges to discuss in depth why they received the score they did, ways to improve, what they are doing right etc. The goal of all parties involved, is to have the performers, staff, and the programs grow and learn.

== Equipment ==
Three primary types of equipment are used in winter guard: flags, rifles, and sabres. Flags may appear in a variety of sizes and formats. Such equipment is used in shows to demonstrate a team's technical ability. Rubber tape, such as electrical tape, is often used to cover the equipment and give it a uniform appearance and protect it from damage during the activity.

=== Flags ===
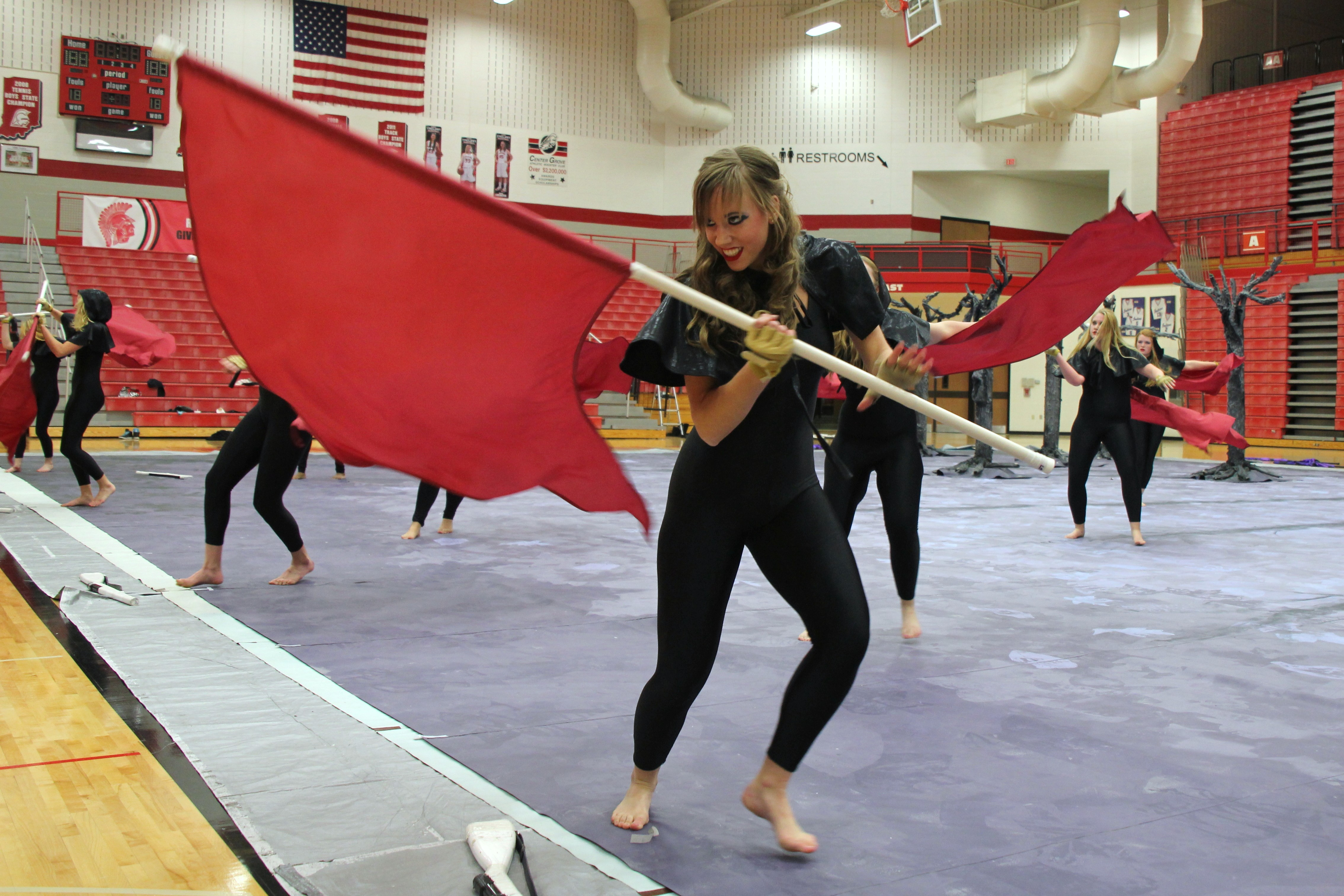
Winter guard show at Center Grove High School in Greenwood, Indiana, 2012

Arguably, the foundational equipment in color guard or winter guard is the flag. While winter guard flags take many different sizes and shapes, a standard size is a six-foot metal, fiberglass, or plastic pole with a 36 inch tall by 54 in wide silk, often including custom sewn or digitally printed designs. Flags with shorter poles and larger silks, called "swing flags", are popular for creating large visual impact as performers can manipulate two flags at once. These flags are often incorporated into the artistic element of the performance, even though they are not practical for tossing or spinning, due to the weight and length of the silk. Other flags may range from 5 feet to 7 feet depending upon the intended effect of the piece of equipment. Longer flags are not practical to spin or toss but generally serve as holders for large pieces of material.

=== Rifles ===
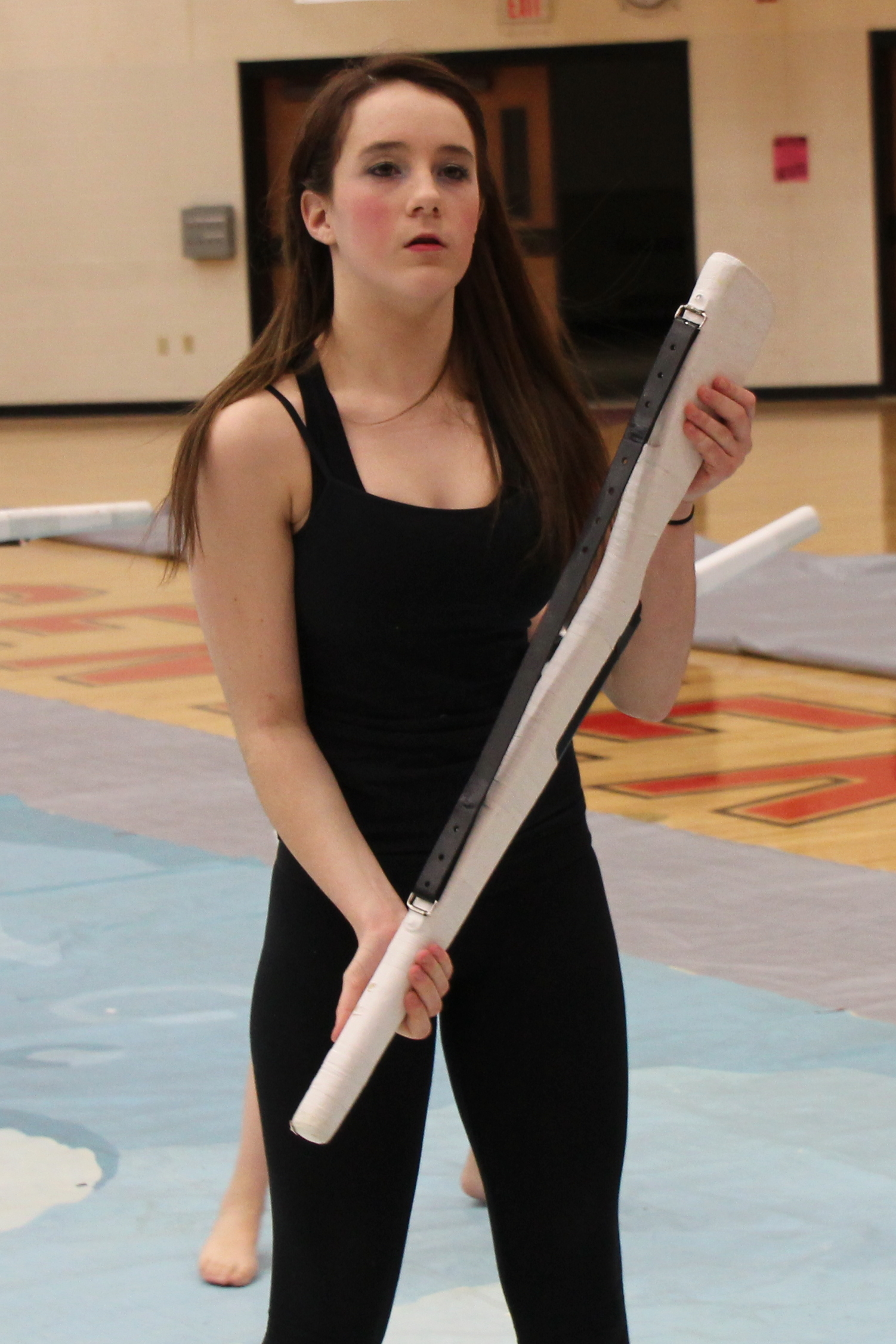
A wooden rifle being used in a Center Grove High School winter guard show

Designed visually similarly to actual rifles, the rifles used in winter guard often weigh between 2 and 5 pounds (about 1–2.25 kilograms). Most winter guard rifles have a length of 30–39 inches (about 76–99 centimeters) and are composed of seven parts:

1. The neck of the rifle. The neck is where the trigger would be on a firearm rifle. Right-handed drop-spins are performed using the neck of the rifle as the axis for the spin, and the neck is also used in common tosses.
2. The bolt is a long silver or black strip of metal or plastic connected to the body of the rifle by screws, made to look like the bolt on a firearm.
3. The body of the rifle is the middle section and the majority of the mass of the rifle.
4. The strap, a long leather strap that reaches from the butt end of the rifle to about two-thirds of the way to the nose of the rifle. The strap has functional and visual purposes, and it is also used to produce a snapping sound. The strap is similar to a firearm's sling.
5. The swivel or clip is the metal piece that attaches the strap to the body of the rifle. This is the most common location for left-hand placement when executing a regular left-handed toss.
6. The butt is the heavier back end of the rifle.
7. The tip is at the end of the thin, long part of the rifle (the equivalent of the barrel on a real rifle), and is located opposite the butt.

Rifles can be made out of either wood or plastic. Some prefer plastic rifles because they are much more often the same weight and size if they are meant to be so. Others prefer wooden rifles because the material is heavier and more durable. Additionally, wood is less slick and can be weighed custom to someone's specifications.

==== Plastic rifles ====
Plastic rifles tend to be a little more forgiving and easier to handle. Some people may not like plastic rifles because they can become slick and hard to handle, either when it's raining or just from the sweat from the user's hands. Some plastic rifles come with a manufacture's guarantee that they will not break under normal usage. Most are made out of a material called polyethylene, making the rifle sturdier and harder to break. The material can also be colored so that different teams can use different colored rifles. Sometimes, though, the material can warp after several bad drops, which can lead to a bad spin while the rifle is in the air. Some say that, after a prolonged period of regular use, a plastic rifle will tend to smell like sweat because of the performer's hands.

==== Wooden rifles ====
Wooden rifles can be more challenging to use because each rifle is slightly different and may not be weighted precisely the same. Most wooden rifles are made of either poplar or aspen wood. It is recommended to tape wooden rifles as to keep the ends protected and make it more durable, as well as for cosmetics. Electrical tape is the first choice of most winter guards because you can get the tape in any color to match the show. Water is the main antagonist to wooden rifles; it can destroy a rifle and make it completely unusable. However, if cared for properly and used correctly, rifles can last for a long time.

=== Sabres ===
Sabres, which are designed much like the real sabres with the same name, are elegant sword-like pieces of equipment used in winter guard, with length ranging from about 30–39 inches (about 76–99 centimeters). They can either be plastic or metal, though metal is more commonly used. Other metal sabres are decorated with intricate engravings or etchings along the blade, which most often carries a much higher price.

Sabres have two main parts: the blade and the hilt. The blade has a pointed but dull end, and the length of the blade is dull as well. Like the wooden rifles, electrical tape can be used to improve the grip on the blade of the sabre, which is useful in choreography involving catching or holding the sabre by its blade. As with rifles, a piece of black or non-white tape placed near the center of rotation is used as a "spotter", making it easier to locate the fast-moving blade while it is rotating in the air. Sabres are used primarily by more advanced guard members.

== Dance ==
Guard members incorporate many different styles of dance into their shows. The most common styles of dance used are modern, contemporary, lyrical, jazz, and ballet. The different styles of dances are chosen depending on the different types of music chosen and the themes of the shows. Dance is incorporated into the show to complement equipment work and drill, and is performed as seamlessly throughout the show as any other movements.

== Winter Guard International ==
Winter Guard International is not only a national competition but it is also an organization that has been around for many years. Unlike other traditional sports, the rules and regulations have been changed and altered many times since the activity has started. There are judges who judge separate elements of a show – such as general effect, movement, equipment, and penalty points – and score the groups accordingly.

Because this activity not only exists in the United States but all around the world, major competitions worldwide are sanctioned and managed by Winter Guard International. This is the governing organization that makes and changes the rules and regulations for this activity. The rules that are written by WGI apply to every winter guard group competing in the World Championships no matter what country they are from. The World Championships are held every year in the United States. Most recently they have been held at the University of Dayton Arena in Dayton, Ohio with some prelims and semi-finals held elsewhere around the Dayton area and Cincinnati area.

The phrase "Sport of the Arts" is frequently associated with WGI. Winter guard is described by saying "it brings music to life through performance in a competitive format."

== Divisions and classes ==
Because not every color guard has the same skill level, population, or resources available, WGI uses a class division system to help remedy this. There are two divisions, Scholastic and Independent. These divisions include the classes (in descending order) Independent: Independent World Class, Independent Open Class, Independent A Class. Scholastic: Scholastic World, Scholastic Open, Scholastic National A Class, Scholastic Regional A, AA, and AAA. Novice Class and Cadet Class.

Guard teams can be chosen to move to a higher class, but they can only move down a class after a period of inactivity or after a WGI review. For every competition, any team which achieves a score higher than a predetermined threshold is automatically moved up, or "bumped", to the class above its current position, even mid-season.

The Scholastic division is made up of guards that have members that all attend the same high school or a feeder school of that high school. There are many colleges and universities that sponsor their own winter guards as well, but these guards typically compete as Independent guards. Scholastic guards vary greatly in their ability and resources because they are more dependent on support from sources other than the members themselves, such as their school's band and school funding.

In the Scholastic division, there are three classes: Scholastic A, Scholastic Open, and Scholastic World. More divisions may exist at the local/regional level, such as Regional A, or Novice. In many places there is also a middle school class, often called Cadet. Scholastic A teams tend to be a step above the regional level and are the lowest level to compete in WGI. Scholastic Open teams are an intermediate level for competition. The Scholastic World division includes the highest caliber of winter guard teams.

The Independent division is composed of winter guard teams that do not associate themselves with a school (the exception being university teams). Additionally, these kinds of guards can be much more selective of their members, choosing to be gender-specific or to only have certain numbers of members.

In the Independent division, much like the Scholastic division, there are the three classes: Independent A, Independent Open and Independent World. The breakdown of skill level and placement mirrors that of the Scholastic division. There are age restrictions in the Independent A and Open classes. A member can perform with an Independent A class group if they are 22 or younger as of March 31 of that year. A member can perform with an Independent Open class group if they are 23 or younger as of March 31 of that year.

== Winter guard circuits ==
Although the goal of many winter guards is to compete in the WGI World Championships, most guard competitions take place in regional winter guard circuits. One such circuit is the Mid-York Colorguard Circuit, established in 1965. Another is the AIA circuit, or Atlantic Indoor Association circuit in which teams across Virginia, Washington D.C., and North Carolina participate. These circuits are loosely organized and may not be formally affiliated with WGI. In many cases the circuits predate WGI by a number of years. For example, the Midwest Color Guard Circuit celebrated their 50th anniversary season in 2007. They may also have different competitive structures with additional classes to those in WGI. Circuit classes often will include beginner or novice guards such as Cadet, Novice, B, Regional AAA, Regional AA, Regional A, Regional Open, and Senior. Circuits generally score using WGI standards and judges whether they are formally affiliated with WGI or not.

In addition, the winter guard activity is growing outside of the United States. In Europe, Color Guard Nederland (Netherlands) (CGN) and Winter Guard United Kingdom (WGUK) have recently affiliated with organizations from France and Germany to form the European Indoor Arts Alliance (EIAA) with the goal of creating a European Union-wide platform for the growth of the color guard activity in Europe, where the scholastic branch of the activity does not exist.

=== United States ===
- Arkansas Marching Arts Association (AMAA) – armarchingarts.org
- Atlantic Indoor Association (AIA) – atlanticindoor.org
- California Color Guard Circuit (CCGC) – theccgc.com
- Carolina Winter Ensemble Association (CWEA) – cweaindoor.org
- Central States Performance Association (CSPA) – cs-pa.org
- Central Valley Guard and Percussion Alliance (CVGPA) – cvgpa.org
- Connecting Individuals through Performing Arts (CIPA) – cipaofficial.org
- East Tennessee Performing Arts Association (ETPAA) – etpaa.org
- Florida Federation of Colorguards Circuit (FFCC) – ffcc.org
- Gulf Coast Color Guard and Percussion Circuit (GCGPC) – gcgpc.org
- Heartland Winter Arts Association (HWAA) – hwaa.org
- Indiana High School Color Guard Association (IHSCGA) – ihscga.org
- Iowa Indoor Marching Arts (IIMA) – iowaima.org
- Keystone Indoor Drill Association (KIDA) – kida.org
- Louisiana–Mississippi Color Guard and Percussion Circuit (LMCGPC) – lmcgpc.org
- Michigan Color Guard Circuit (MCGC) – mcgc.net
- Mid Continent Color Guard Association (MCCGA) – mccga.org
- Mid-East Performance Association (MEPA) – mepa-circuit.org
- Mid-Atlantic Indoor Network (MAIN) – mainguards.com
- Mid-York Color Guard Circuit (MYCGC) – mycgc.org
- Midwest Color Guard Circuit (MWCGC) – midwestcolorguard.com
- Mississippi Indoor Association (MIA) – msindoor.com
- Musical Arts Conference (MAC) – musicalartsconference.com
- New England Scholastic Band Association (NESBA) – nesba.org
- North Star Circuit (NSC) – northstarcircuit.org
- North Texas Colorguard Association (NTCA) – ntca-online.com
- Northeast Color Guard Circuit (NECGC) – necgc.org
- Northern California Band Association (NCBA) – ncbaonline.net
- Northern Nevada Indoor Association (NNIA) – envisionarts.org
- Northwest Association for Performing Arts (NWAPA) – nwapa.net
- Ohio Indoor Performance Association (OIPA) – ohiocircuit.org
- Pacific Performing Arts Association (PPA) – pacificperformingarts.org
- Pep and Pageantry Arts of Central California (PPAACC) – ppaacc.com
- Rocky Mountain Color Guard Association (RMCGA) – rmcga.org
- San Joaquin Valley Color Guard and Percussion Review (SJVCGPR) – sjvcgpr.compsuite.io
- South Florida Winter Guard Association (SFWGA) – sfwga.org
- South Valley Winter Arts Association (SVWAA) – svwaa.com
- Southeastern Color Guard Circuit (SCGC) – scgconline.org
- Southern Association for Performance Arts (SAPA) – sapaonline.net
- Texas Color Guard Circuit (TCGC) – texascolorguardcircuit.org
- Texas Educational Colorguard Association (TECA) – go-teca.org
- Three Rivers Winter Ensemble Association (TRWEA) – trwea.org
- Tournament Indoor Association (TIA) – njatob.org
- TriState Marching Arts (TMA) – tristatemarchingarts.org
- Utah Color Guard Circuit (UCGC) – utahcolorguardcircuit.org
- West Coast Performance Association (WCPA) – westcoastperformanceassociation.org
- West Coast Winter Guard (WCWG) – westcoastwg.net
- West Texas Color Guard Association (WTCA) – wtca-online.org
- Winter Guard and Percussion of Oklahoma (WGPO) – wgpoklahoma.org
- Winter Guard Arizona (WGAZ) – wgaz.org
- Winter Guard Association of Southern California (WGASC) – wgasc.org

=== Canada ===
- Alberta Marching and Performing Arts Association – encorpswinterguard.ca
- Arts en mouvement Québec – famq.org

=== Europe ===
- Color Guard Nederland (CGN) – cgnunited.nl
- Winter Guard United Kingdom (WGUK) – wguk.org.uk

=== Asia ===
- WGI Japan – wgi.org

== In film and television ==
"On Guard: A Story of American Youth" is 2023 documentary film directed by Allen Otto and executive produced by Jim Czarnecki. The film follows the journey of an all-female color guard team at Bel Air High School whose goal is to qualify for the 2020 WGI World Championships, which were ultimately canceled due to the COVID-19 pandemic, with a performance dedicated to the victims of the 2019 El Paso Walmart shooting.

Contemporary Color is a 2016 documentary film directed by Turner Ross and Bill Ross IV featuring the performances of winter guard teams. The film was produced as a collaboration between David Byrne, Michael Gottwald, Dan Janvey and Josh Penn.
