= Blue Knights Drum and Bugle Corps =

Junior drum and bugle corps based in Denver, Colorado

Blue Knights
- Location: Denver, Colorado
- Division: World Class
- Founded: 1958
- Director: Mark Arnold
- Website: ascendperformingarts.org

The Blue Knights Drum and Bugle Corps is a World Class competitive junior drum and bugle corps. Based in Denver, Colorado, the Blue Knights are a member corps of Drum Corps International (DCI).

== History ==
Fred and Fae Taylor were a pair of former vaudeville comedians and musicians who had settled in Denver and operated the Fred and Fae Talent School, where they taught vocal and instrumental music to young people. Fred was an accomplished drummer and a member of the Denver American Legion Grenadiers Senior Drum and Bugle Corps, and he believed that a junior corps would provide an opportunity for their music students to perform before the public.

Although the intent was for the corps to be a parade corps, it entered its first field competition during its first season, and in 1959, the corps traveled to the VFW National Championships in Minneapolis. In 1963, the corps joined the Great Plains Drum and Bugle Corps Association and entered into a period extending through the sixties and seventies where they were regularly competing in Kansas, Oklahoma, Colorado, Wyoming and Nebraska.

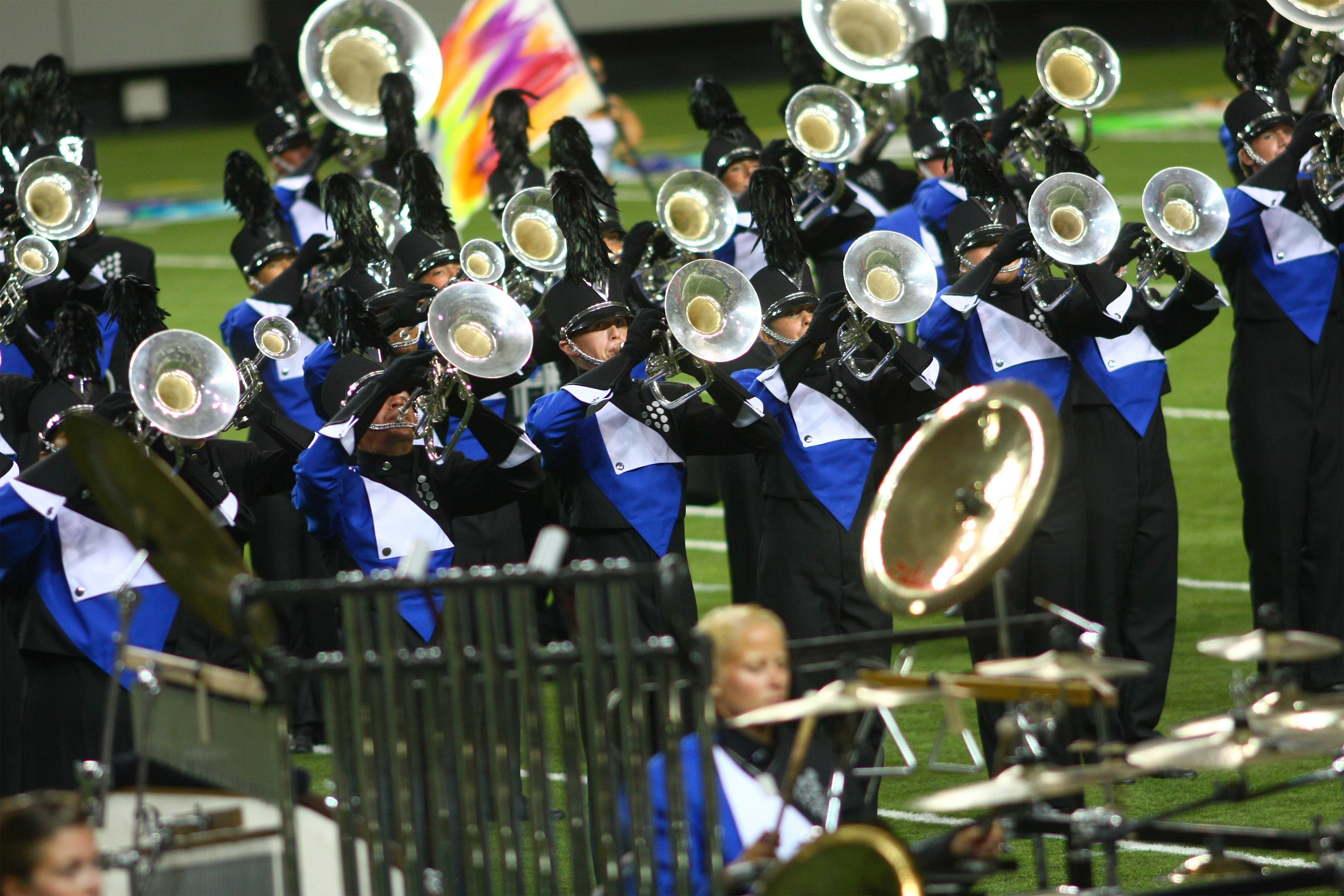
The Blue Knights, 2008

The corps attended its first DCI Championships in 1975 in Philadelphia, finishing 11th in the Class A preliminaries. In 1977, 1978, and 2004 the Blue Knights were hosts for the Drum Corps International World Championships. In 1979, the corps renamed its home competition, Drums Along The Rockies and turned it into both a major national competition and one of the corps' primary fundraising activities.

In 1984, George and Lynn Lindstrom became the corps directors. The Lindstroms were to instill the corps with a professional attitude toward competition; the successful bingo operation, in place since the early 80s, made it possible for the corps to purchase the equipment necessary to fulfill the goals of the new attitude. The Lindstroms departed after the 1985 season, and director Mark Arnold was hired. Under Arnold's leadership, the corps became a major competitor, earning its first finals spot in 1991. Since then, the corps been a finalist twenty-seven times across thirty-three competitive seasons.

After working as acting director during the 2021 season, Daniel Belcher was promoted to executive director. After several seasons, Daniel Belcher moved on to other opportunities with Mark Arnold returning to his role as executive director for the 2024 season.

== Blue Knights Percussion Ensemble ==
The Blue Knights Percussion Ensemble was established in 1993 and first competed in the 1994 Winter Guard International season where they won their first world championship. They also won world championships in 1999, 2000, and 2003. The Blue Knights are also the longest continually running WGI Percussion Ensemble.

The Blue Knights also operated an open class ensemble that made appearances at WGI Percussion Independent Open finals in 2005 and 2006. After years of inactivity, the Blue Knights Independent Open ensemble returned for the 2024 WGI season.

== Show summary (1975–2026) ==
Key
Pale green background indicates DCI World Class Semifinalist (Note: From 1983-1991, the Blue Knights competed in Open Class; from 1992-2007 in Division I, and since 2008 in World Class. These are the same tier, just renamed.)
Pale blue background indicates DCI World Class Finalist

Year	Repertoire	World Championships	
Year	Repertoire	Score	Placement
1975	Repertoire unavailable	48.150	11th Place; Class A
1976	Battle of Britain by William Walton / Hill Where the Lord Hides by Chuck Mangione / Battle Hymn of the Republic by William Steffe & Julia Ward Howe / Feelings by Louis Gasté & Morris Albert	Did not attend World Championships	
1977	Somewhere, When You're a Jet, Mambo & Tonight (all from West Side Story) by Leonard Bernstein & Stephen Sondheim / I Get Crazy & Hill Where the Lord Hides by Chuck Mangione / Evergreen (from A Star Is Born) by Barbra Streisand & Paul Williams / Maria (from West Side Story) by Leonard Bernstein & Stephen Sondheim	57.900	41st Place; Open Class
1978–82	Repertoires unavailable	Did not attend World Championships	
1983	Magic Flea by Sammy Nestico / Tuxedo Junction by Erskine Hawkins, Bill Johnson, Julian Dash & Buddy Feyne / That's a Plenty by Lew Pollack / Dixie Land Jazz / For Your Eyes Only by Bill Conti & Mick Leeson	51.700	31st Place; Open Class
1984	If You Could Read My Mind by Gordon Lightfoot / Sweet Inspiration by John Cameron / Trilogy by Keith Emerson & Greg Lake / Magician by Andrew Leigh / Ain't No Mountain High Enough by Ashford & Simpson / I'm Gonna Make You Love Me by Gamble and Huff & Jerry Ross	70.700	22nd Place; Open Class
1985	A Pirates' Tale; Pirates by Keith Emerson, Greg Lake & Peter Sinfield	68.200	31st Place; Open Class
1986	Rockin' The Rockies; Rockin' The Paradise by Dennis DeYoung, Tommy Shaw & James "J.Y." Young (Styx) / Too Much Time on my Hands by Tommy Shaw / Since You Asked by Judy Collins / Light Up by Dennis DeYoung / Thick as a Brick by Ian Anderson (Jethro Tull) / Feels Like the First Time by Mick Jones (Foreigner)	68.700	27th Place; Open Class
1987	Savannah River Holiday by Ron Nelson / Ritual Fire Dance (from El amor brujo) by Manuel de Falla / Requiem by Andrew Lloyd Webber	73.400	22nd Place; Open Class; Semifinalist
1988	Moorside March by Gustav Holst / Divertimento for Band by Vincent Persichetti / Pie Jesu (from Requiem) by Andrew Lloyd Webber / March (from First Suite in E-Flat) by Gustav Holst	78.600	17th Place; Open Class; Semifinalist
1989	Moorside March by Gustav Holst / Punchinello by Alfred Reed	81.200	16th Place; Open Class; Semifinalist
1990	Chichester Psalms, Offertory, I Go On, Sanctus & Agnus Dei; All from Mass by Leonard Bernstein	85.400	13th Place; Open Class; Semifinalist
1991	Savannah River Holiday by Ron Nelson / Outdoor Overture by Aaron Copland / Aspen Jubilee by Ron Nelson	87.700	9th Place; Open Class; Finalist
1992	Portraits of Aaron Copland; Billy the Kid, Corral Nocturne (from Rodeo) & The Red Pony by Aaron Copland / Chorale & Shaker Dance by John Zdechlik	90.000	9th Place; Division I Finalist
1993	The Next Generation; Battle in the Mutara Nebula (from Star Trek II: The Wrath of Khan) by James Horner / Clear All Moorings & Star Trek VI Suite (from Star Trek VI: The Undiscovered Country) by Cliff Eidelman / Little Green Men by Steve Vai	85.000	10th Place; Division I Finalist
1994	Trittico For Brass Band; Trittico For Brass Band by James Curnow	88.400	7th Place; Division I Finalist
1995	Legacy; Introduction, Main Theme, Adagio, Fugue & Finale; All from Legacy by Ramsey Lewis	81.300	13th Place; Division I Semifinalist
1996	Music of Ron Nelson; Rocky Point Holiday & Sonoran Desert Holiday by Ron Nelson	80.700	12th Place; Division I Finalist
1997	Ben-Hur; Prelude, Overture & The Battle, Parts I and II (from Ben-Hur) by Miklós Rózsa / Lithe Girl, Brown Girl (from The Lovers) & Father In Heaven (from Prayers of Kierkegaard) by Samuel Barber	88.200	9th Place; Division I Finalist
1998	Masters of the Symphony; Symphony No. 10, Mvts. 1 & 2 by Dmitri Shostakovich / Symphony No. 6 (Pathétique), Mvts. 1 & 3 by Pyotr Ilyich Tchaikovsky / Largo (from Symphony No. 9) by Antonín Dvořák / Ode to Joy (from Symphony No. 9) by Ludwig van Beethoven	89.500	9th Place; Division I Finalist
1999	Suite for Brass and Percussion; Trittico For Brass Band by James Curnow / Partita For Band by Edward Gregson	92.500	7th Place; Division I Finalist
2000	Colors of Brass and Percussion; Movements 1 & 3 (from Montage) / A Time for Love, A Time for Hate & A Time for Peace (from The Essence of Time); All by Peter Graham	92.000	6th Place; Division I Finalist
2001	Blue Toons; Cartoon by Paul Hart / Black Market Juggler by Joe Zawinul / An American in Paris by George Gershwin	83.900	14th Place; Division I Semifinalist
2002	Fear and Trembling; Piano Concerto No. 1, Op. 35 by Dmitri Shostakovich / Piano Concerto Op. 38 by Samuel Barber	85.500	13th Place; Division I Semifinalist
2003	Primary Colors; Kaval Sviri (Traditional), adapted by Peter Liomdev / Izpoved by Krassimir Kyurkchiysky / Prologue by Mike Nevin	85.350	13th Place; Division I Semifinalist
2004	A Knight's Tale; A Knight's Tale by Mike Nevin / Trittico For Brass Band by James Curnow / I Go On (from Mass) by Leonard Bernstein	87.600	10th Place; Division I Finalist
2005	A Midsummer Knight's Dream; Some Enchanted Evening (from South Pacific) by Richard Rodgers & Oscar Hammerstein II / A Midsummer Knight's Dream by Mike Nevin, Russ Newbury & Pat Amann	88.225	10th Place; Division I Finalist
2006	Dark Knights; Piano Concerto by Samuel Barber	90.125	7th Place; Division I Finalist
2007	Dark Dances; Piano Concerto No. 1 & Symphony No. 10 by Dmitri Shostakovich	90.275	8th Place; Division I Finalist
2008	Knight Reign; Cloudburst by Eric Whitacre / Turbine by John Mackey / Jeux d’eau by Maurice Ravel / Amazing Grace by William Walker & John Newton	88.250	9th Place; World Class; Finalist
2009	Shiver: A Winter in Colorado; Winter (from The Four Seasons) by Antonio Vivaldi / Glide by Russ Newbury & Jeff Audesmore / Landslide by Stevie Nicks / Tarantella by Phil Kline / Coronation (from Stardust) by Ilan Eshkeri	86.450	11th Place; World Class; Finalist
2010	Europa! L'Arlesienne Suite No. 2: Farandole by Georges Bizet / W.N. & Nimrod (from Enigma Variations) by Edward Elgar / Symphony No. 1, Mvt. 4 by Johannes Brahms	87.100	11th Place; World Class; Finalist
2011	An English Folk Song Suite; First Suite in E-Flat by Gustav Holst / English Folk Song Suite by Ralph Vaughan Williams / Shepherd's Hey & Molly on the Shore by Percy Grainger / Five Variants of Dives & Lazarus by Ralph Vaughan Williams	89.200	9th Place; World Class; Finalist
2012	Avian; Danse Infernal, Berceuse & Finale; All from The Firebird Suite by Igor Stravinsky	86.700	10th Place; World Class; Finalist
2013	NoBeginningNoEnd; This Bitter Earth by Clyde Otis / On the Nature of Daylight by Max Richter / Circle One by Jay Bocook / The First Circle by Pat Metheny & Lyle Mays	87.750	10th Place; World Class; Finalist
2014	That One Second; A Kaleidoscope of Mathematics (from A Beautiful Mind) by James Horner / Brief Eternity by Don Rosler & Roger Treece / Hand of Fate – Part 1 (from Signs) by James Newton Howard / To Build a Home by Patrick Watson, Phil France & Jason Swinscoe (The Cinematic Orchestra)	91.150	8th Place; World Class; Finalist
2015	Because... Because by Lennon–McCartney / Head Rush by Jay Bocook, Kevin Shah & Mike Jackson / Après Moi by Regina Spektor / I'm Alive by Adam Watts / Heart of Courage by Two Steps From Hell / Fly to Paradise by Eric Whitacre	91.850	6th Place; World Class; Finalist
2016	The Great Event; Gorgon by Christopher Rouse / Flight to the Wasteland, Adagio and Transfiguration & Arrows of the Gods Medley by Elliot Goldenthal / Fratres by Arvo Part / The Great Event by Leonard Cohen / Moonlight Sonata by Ludwig van Beethoven / Air Waltz by Oliver Davis / Saturn by Ryan O'Neal (Sleeping at Last)	90.738	7th Place; World Class; Finalist
2017	i Wave by Beck / Concerto for Percussion and Orchestra by Joseph Schwantner / 107 Steps by Björk / Hide and Seek by Imogen Heap	90.400	8th Place; World Class; Finalist
2018	The Fall and Rise; Sun King by Lennon–McCartney / The Rite of Spring by Igor Stravinsky / Exit Music by Thom Yorke, Jonny Greenwood, Philip Selway, Ed O'Brien & Colin Greenwood (Radiohead) / Welcome to the Machine by Roger Waters / Time After Time by Cyndi Lauper & Rob Hyman	88.925	9th Place; World Class; Finalist
2019	...I Remember Everything; Sudden Throw by Ólafur Arnalds / Liquid by Jay Bocook / Hurt by Trent Reznor (Nine Inch Nails) / Lonely World by Moses Sumney	92.050	7th Place; World Class; Finalist
2020	Season canceled due to the COVID-19 pandemic		
2021	Always; What a Wonderful World by Bob Thiele & George David Weiss / Rank and File by Moses Sumney / Both Sides Now by Joni Mitchell / Lovely by Billie Eilish O'Connell, Finneas O'Connell & Khalid Donnel Robinson (Khalid)	No scored competitions	
2022	Vibe; Neglected Space by Imogen Heap / Wailers & Don't Worry Be Happy by Bobby McFerrin / She by Laura Mvula / Locked Out of Heaven by Bruno Mars, Philip Lawrence & Ari Levine	85.787	14th Place; World Class; Semifinalist
2023	Unharnessed; Requiem by Giuseppe Verdi / Released by Jeff Ausdemore & James Catherall / Break On Through (To the Other Side) by The Doors / Submission by Leslie Gilreath & Jeff Ausdemore / Absolution of Word by Jeff Ausdemore & James Catherall / Fly Away by Lenny Kravitz / Freedom by Pharrell Williams	86.375	12th Place; World Class; Finalist
2024	BusK; Signal to Noise by Peter Gabriel / Busk by James Catherall, Jeff Audesmore & Leslie Gilreath / Pampeana #3 by Alberto Ginestera / Rings by James Catherall, Jeff Audesmore & Leslie Gilreath / New Moon in the Old Moon's Arms by Michael Kamen / Orbital by John Psathas / Baba Yetu by Christopher Tin	85.600	14th Place; World Class; Semifinalist
2025	DRiP; Flying 101 by Ms Bronx / DRiP by Leslie Gilreath, Jeff Ausdemore & Tanner Leonardo / Main Title from Cast Away by Alan Silvestri / Water by Tyla	87.450	12th Place; World Class; Finalist
2026	The Sky Between; On My Knees by Rüfüs Du Sol / 17 Hands by Alfonso Peduto / On a Clear Day by Burton Lane / Both Sides Now by Joni Mitchell / Ordinary by Alex Warren / Original music by Leslie Gilreath, Jeff Ausdemore & Tanner Leonardo	86.175	12th Place; World Class Finalist
