= Contemporary Color (film) =

- Directed by: Turner Ross; Bill Ross IV
- Produced by: David Byrne; Michael Gottwald; Dan Janvey; Josh Penn
- Starring: David Byrne
- Cinematography: Turner Ross; Bill Ross IV; Jarred Alterman
- Release date: April 14, 2016
- Running time: 97 minutes
- Country: United States
- Language: English

Contemporary Color is a 2016 documentary film directed by Turner Ross and Bill Ross IV. The film was produced as a collaboration between David Byrne, Michael Gottwald, Dan Janvey and Josh Penn.

It is a concert film featuring performances by David Byrne, Nelly Furtado, How to Dress Well, Devonte Hynes, Money Mark + Ad Rock, Zola Jesus, Lucius, Nico Muhly + Ira Glass, St. Vincent and tUnE-yArDs.
