= Bel Air High School (El Paso, Texas) =

Location
- 731 N. Yarbrough; El Paso, Texas 79915; United States; 31.747254°N 106.345953°W

Information
- Type: Public
- Motto: Loyal Forever
- Established: 1957
- School district: Ysleta Independent School District
- Principal: Jake Valtierra
- Teaching staff: 115.78 (on an FTE basis)
- Grades: 9-12
- Enrollment: 1,866 (2024–2025)
- Student to teacher ratio: 16.12
- Campus: Urban
- Colors: Scarlet, white, and blue
- Athletics conference: 5A-D1
- Nickname: Highlanders
- Website: www.yisd.net/o/belair

Bel Air High School is a high school in the city of El Paso, Texas, United States. The school was established in 1957. It houses Bel Air Middle School, with transfers from Eastwood as well as other local middle schools. Its Health Professions Branch offers the most transfers, closely followed by the Global Enterprises program.

Bel Air High School placed 984th on Newsweek's list of the nation's top high schools based on rankings influenced heavily by the number of students who took Advanced Placement tests the previous year. In 2013, Texas UIL changed the areas from 4A-5A to a 5A-6A divisions causing Bel Air High School to remain behind in the 5A division due to the lack of student population.

== Engineering ==
During freshman year, all students take Concepts of Engineering and Technology.

In sophomore year, they are separated into three smaller divisions, entering into Engineering Design and Presentation, Principles of Engineering (PTLW), or Principles of Architectures and Construction.

In junior year, they gain the second level of their previous choice, which are Robotics and Automation, Digital Electronics, and Architectural Design.

In senior year, they develop into two pathways, Engineering Design and Development, and Advanced Interior Design.

== Alumni ==
Bel Air Highlander Alumni is the alumni association.

- Willarda V. Edwards, physician
- James Forbes, basketball player

== Parent organization ==
The Bel Air Highland Clan is the parent organization.

== Sports ==
On April 20, 2019, the Bel Air High School Boys soccer team won the 5A state championship. It was the Highlanders' first ever state championship in soccer. It was one of two state championships that the city of El Paso, TX claimed that day. The San Eli High School boys soccer team also won their respective division. The Highlanders first made school history in the 2019 season by advancing to the final four for the first time. To win the state championship, the Highlanders knocked off the two time defending state champions Frisco Wakeland. The game was won by a second half goal scored by the Highlanders' Ivar Arroyo, who was later named the MVP of the match.
