= Leander, Texas =

- City
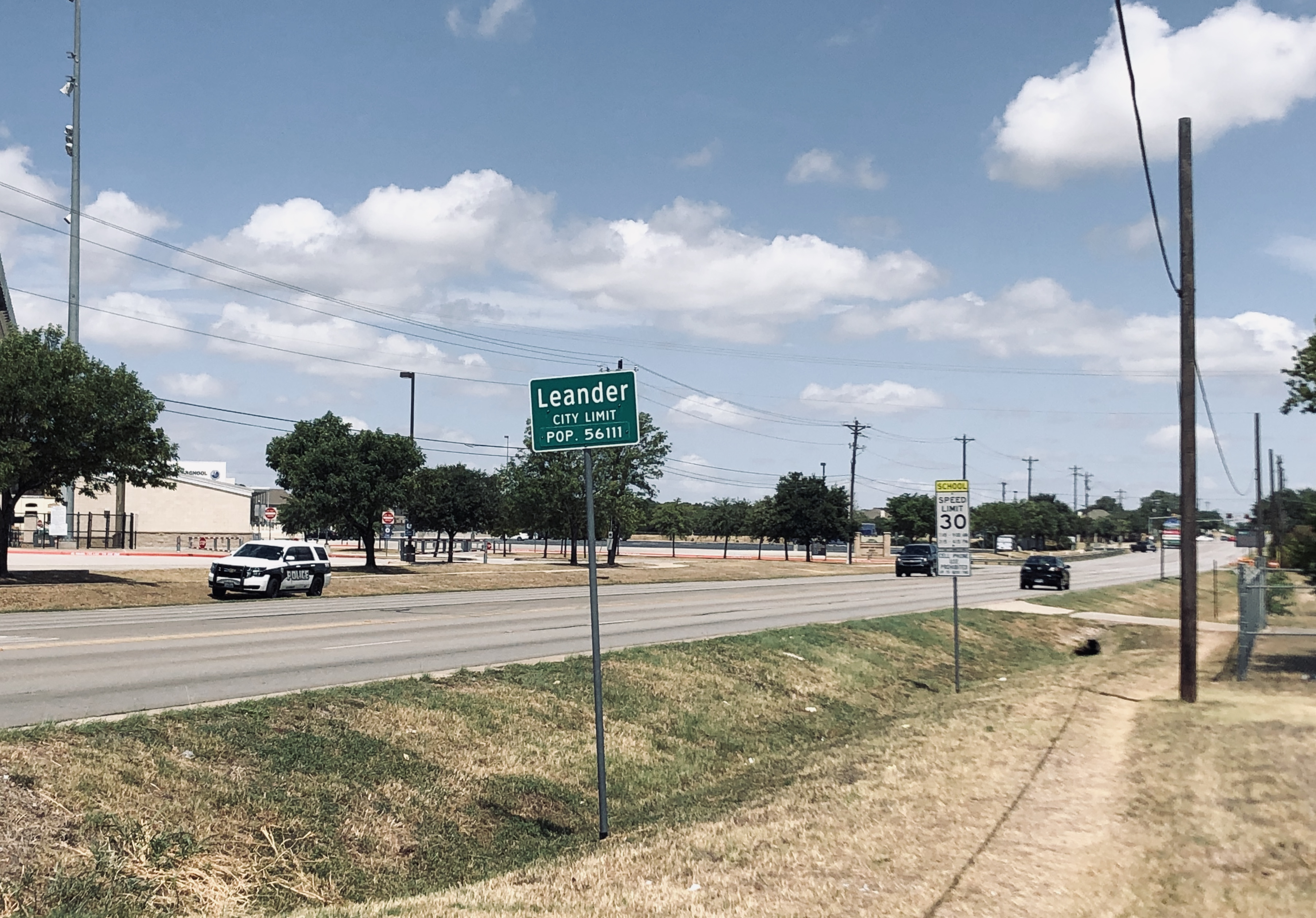
- Leander city limit

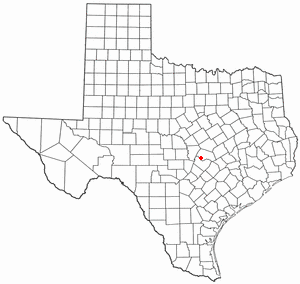
- Location of Leander, Texas

- Coordinates: 30°34′44″N 97°51′11″W
- Country: United States
- State: Texas
- Counties: Williamson, Travis
- Established: 1882
- Incorporated: January 21, 1978

Government
  - Type: Council-manager
  - Mayor: Na'Cole Thompson
  - City manager: Todd Parton

Area
  - Total: 37.70 sq mi (97.65 km^{2})
  - Land: 37.50 sq mi (97.13 km^{2})
  - Water: 0.20 sq mi (0.52 km^{2})
- Elevation: 1,017 ft (310 m)

Population (2020)
  - Total: 59,202
  - Estimate (2025): 91,132
  - Density: 1,160.6/sq mi (448.11/km^{2})
- Time zone: UTC-6 (Central (CST))
  - Summer (DST): UTC-5 (CDT)
- ZIP codes: 78641, 78646
- Area code(s): 512 & 737
- FIPS code: 48-42016
- GNIS feature ID: 2410812
- Website: www.leandertx.gov

Leander (/liˈændər/ lee-AN-dər) is a city in Williamson and Travis Counties, Texas, United States. Its population was 59,202 at the 2020 census and 91,132 at the 2025 census estimate. A suburb just north of Austin, and part of the Greater Austin metropolitan area, it was the fastest-growing city in the United States between 2018 and 2019.

== History ==
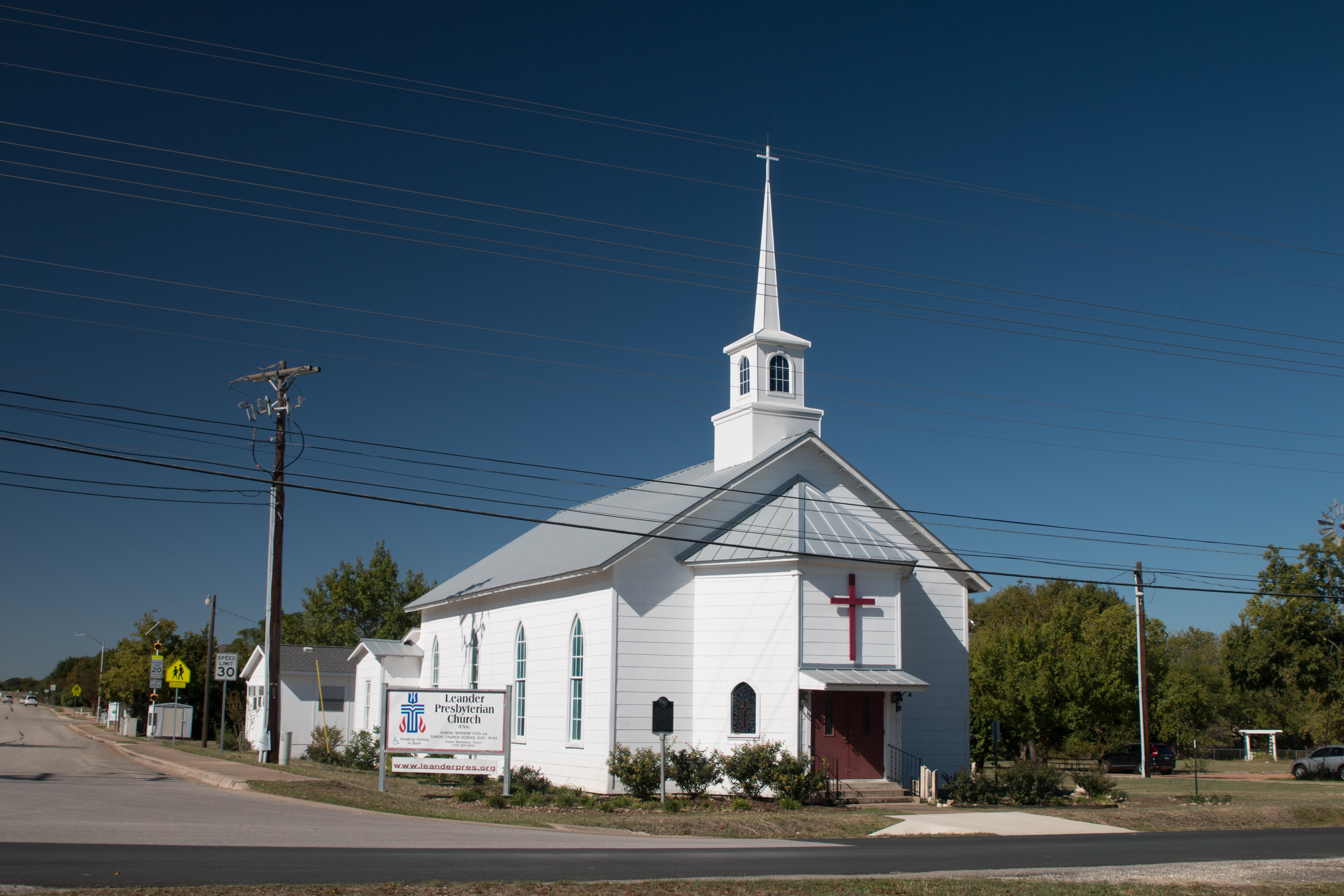
Leander Presbyterian Church (built 1884)

Leander was established in 1882 on land sold by the Austin and Northwestern Railroad Co. to prospective citizens. The town was named in honor of Leander "Catfish" Brown, one of the railroad officials responsible for the completion of the line.

Tumlinson Fort, the first Anglo-American settlement in Williamson County, was established in early January 1836 at the headwaters of Brushy Creek, four miles south of present-day Leander. With the purpose of protecting settlers from attacks by the Comanche, a company of Texas Rangers occupied the post until late February, when the invasion of Santa Anna made abandoning the post necessary, soon after which it was burned by the Comanche.

The Webster Massacre occurred just east of present-day Leander in October, 1839, when a party of 16 settlers traveling westward through the area was attacked by a band of Comanche, and all but three were killed. A 1936 Texas Centennial marker marks the location where the dead were buried in a mass grave, now located inside the Davis Cemetery east of Leander. The marker incorrectly lists thirty of the Webster party were killed. Dolly Webster's account, the only first hand description written by an adult survivor, lists by name a party of sixteen, which included her husband, herself, and her two children, the only survivors. Webster says about fifteen or more Comanche were killed that day or died soon after from wounds. Dolly Webster's account says it occurred at dawn, October 13, though "October 13" appears to be a misprint, the actual date being October 1 based on the travel itinerary she provided.

Near Leander, the Leanderthal Lady, a skeleton dating back 10,000 to 13,000 years, was discovered; the site was one of the earliest intact burials found in the United States.

In August and September 2011, destructive wildfires swept through two central Leander neighborhoods, burning a total of 330 acres (130 ha) and destroying 26 homes.

== Geography ==
Leander is located at the intersection of Ranch to Market Road 2243 and U.S. Route 183, about 22 miles northwest of downtown Austin. Georgetown lies five miles to the east on Route 2243.

According to the City of Leander, the city has a total area of 34.08 square miles (88.3 km^{2}), all land.

== Demographics ==
Historical population
Census	Pop.	Note	%±
1980	2,179		—
1990	3,398		55.9%
2000	7,596		123.5%
2010	26,521		249.1%
2020	59,202		123.2%
2025 (est.)	91,132		53.9%
U.S. Decennial Census

=== 2020 census ===
As of the 2020 census, Leander had a population of 59,202, 19,925 households, and 15,118 families. The population density was 1,016.2 inhabitants per square mile (392.4/km^{2}).

The median age was 35.6 years. 29.0% of residents were under the age of 18 and 9.3% of residents were 65 years of age or older. For every 100 females there were 97.1 males, and for every 100 females age 18 and over there were 94.2 males age 18 and over.

Of the 19,925 households, 47.1% had children under the age of 18 living in them. Of all households, 64.7% were married-couple households, 12.0% were households with a male householder and no spouse or partner present, and 18.0% were households with a female householder and no spouse or partner present. About 15.4% of all households were made up of individuals and 5.4% had someone living alone who was 65 years of age or older. There were 21,659 housing units, of which 8.0% were vacant. The homeowner vacancy rate was 3.4% and the rental vacancy rate was 13.3%.

96.0% of residents lived in urban areas, while 4.0% lived in rural areas.

Racial composition as of the 2020 census
Race	Number	Percent
White	37,244	62.9%
Black or African American	3,008	5.1%
American Indian and Alaska Native	464	0.8%
Asian	5,948	10.0%
Native Hawaiian and Other Pacific Islander	77	0.1%
Some other race	3,803	6.4%
Two or more races	8,658	14.6%
Hispanic or Latino (of any race)	13,087	22.1%

=== 2015–2019 American Community Survey ===
As of the 2015–2019 American Community Survey 5-year estimates, the median household income (in 2019 dollars) was $101,872, the per capita income was $36,893, and 4.2% of the population lived below the poverty line.

== Education ==
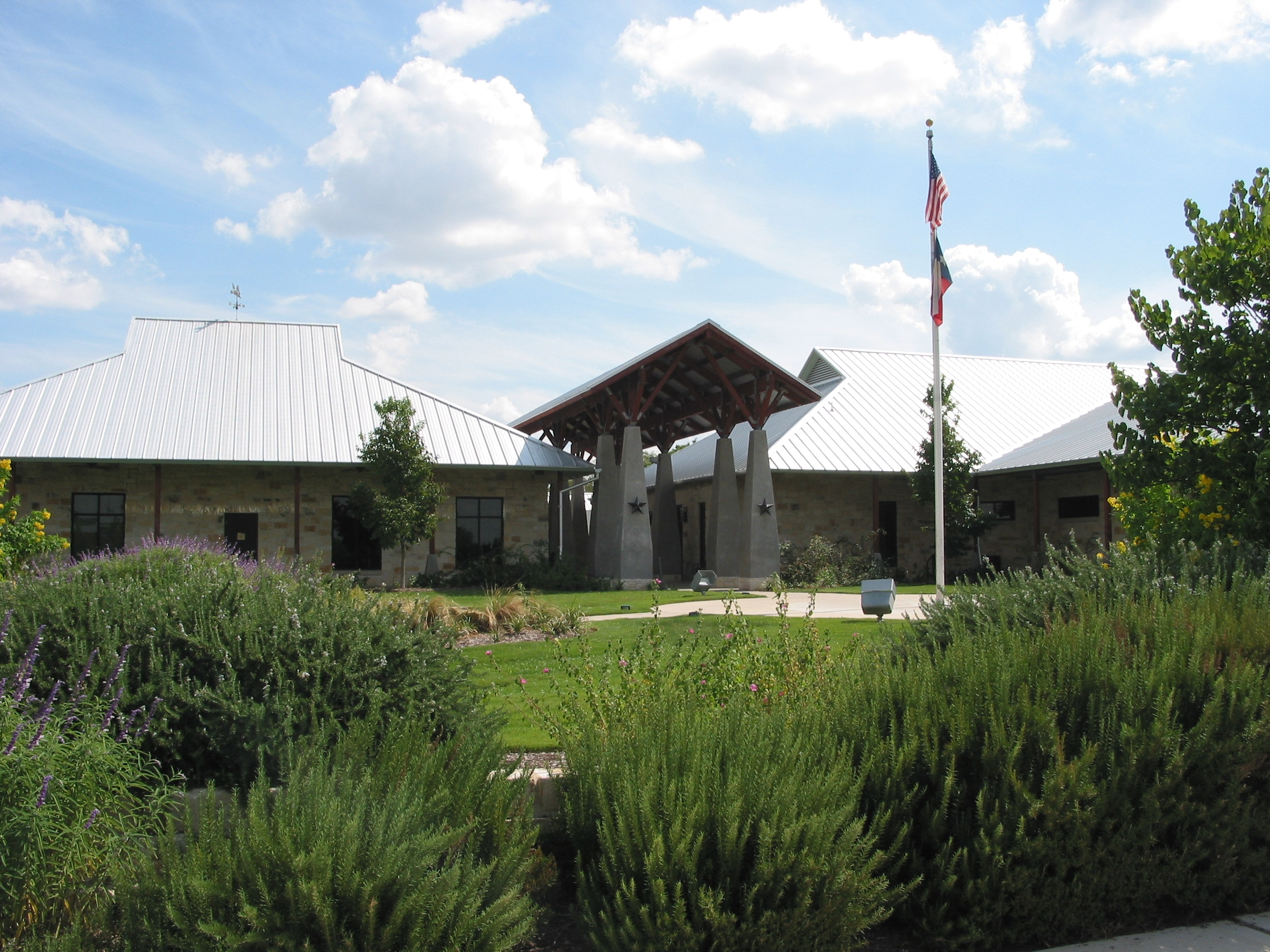
Leander Public Library

Leander is the center of the Leander Independent School District. Schools in the district include Leander High School, Vista Ridge High School, Cedar Park High School, Charles Rouse High School, Vandegrift High School, Tom Glenn High School, Wiley Middle School (Bernice Knox Wiley Middle School), Stiles Middle School (Florence W. Stiles Middle School), Leander Middle School, Danielson Middle School, Henry Middle School, Running Brushy Middle School, Cedar Park Middle School, Canyon Ridge Middle school, Parkside Elementary School, Pleasant Hill Elementary School, Rutledge Elementary School, Whitestone Elementary School, Jim Plain Elementary School, and Block House Creek Elementary School, Winkley Elementary School, Reed Elementary School, Camacho Elementary (STEM) school, Bagdad Elementary School, and Monta Akin Elementary School.

== Infrastructure ==
=== Transportation ===
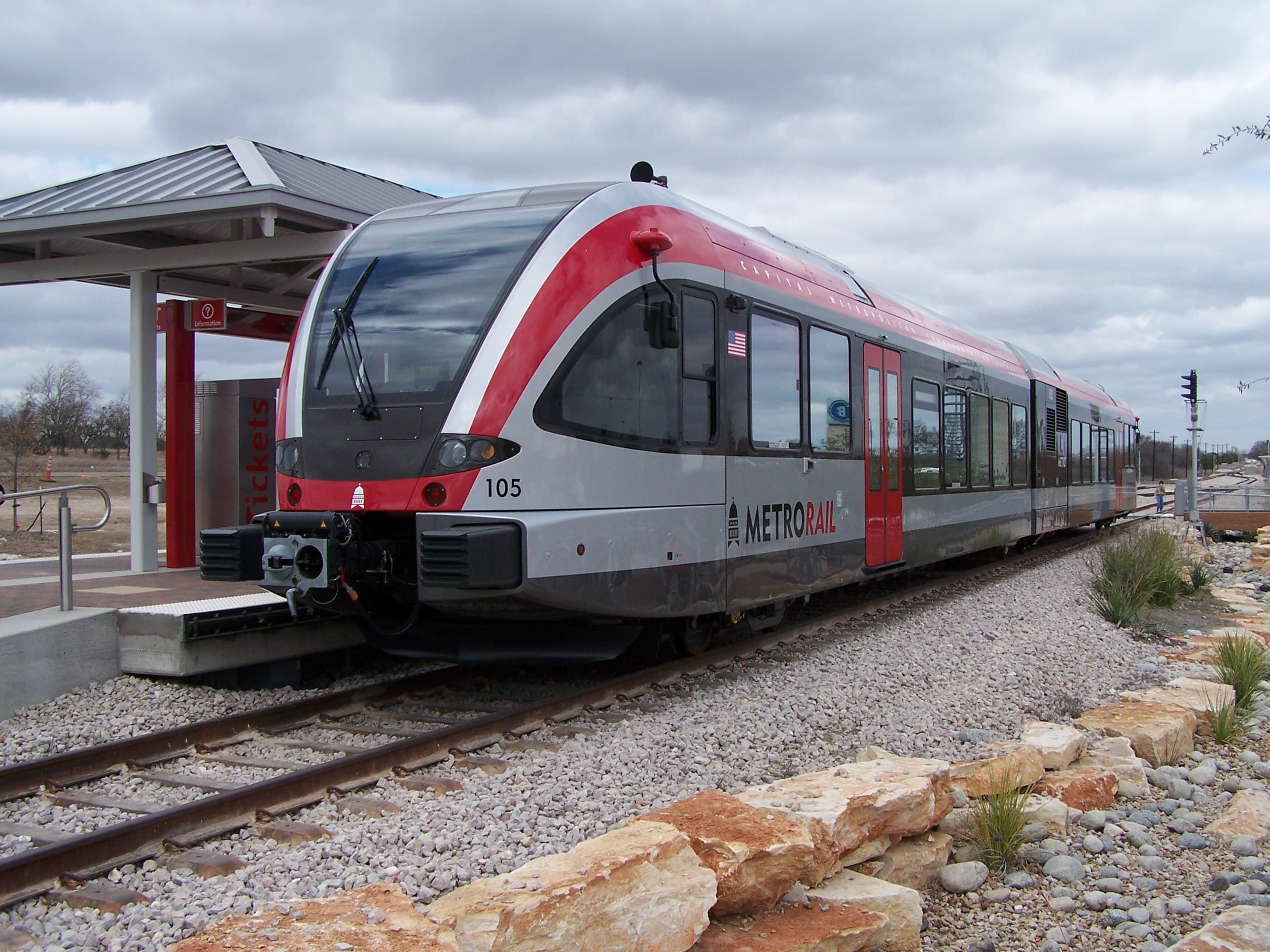
CapMetro Rail Station

Leander is a jurisdiction member of the Capital Metropolitan Transportation Authority (Capital Metro). The northern terminus for the Capital MetroRail Red Line is located at Leander Station and Park and Ride designed by McKinney York Architects, located on U.S. Highway 183 north of Ranch to Market Road 2243. Leander Station also has access to several express bus lines, and includes a park and ride facility with 600 parking spaces.

== The Texas Chainsaw Massacre ==
The 1974 film The Texas Chain Saw Massacre, directed by Tobe Hooper and staring Marilyn Burns, was partly filmed at Bagdad Cemetery, 400 N Bagdad Rd, Leander, Texas. The cemetery appears in the opening grave-robbing tableau and in the later scene in which Sally Hardesty (Burns) and her brother Franklin check their grandfather's grave. The corpses and headstone they were mounted on were props, the surrounding monuments were real. The caretaker allowed the crew to shoot on the grounds. The site is an active cemetery and should be visited respectfully.

== Notable people ==
- Logan Bearden, racing driver
- Nate Champion, notable in the Johnson County War
- Dan Janjigian, Olympian, author and management consultant
- Kyle Park, country music singer-songwriter
- Khiry Shelton, professional soccer player
- Ramesh Srivastava, lead singer of the band Voxtrot
- Paul Thompson, football player
