= Leander High School =

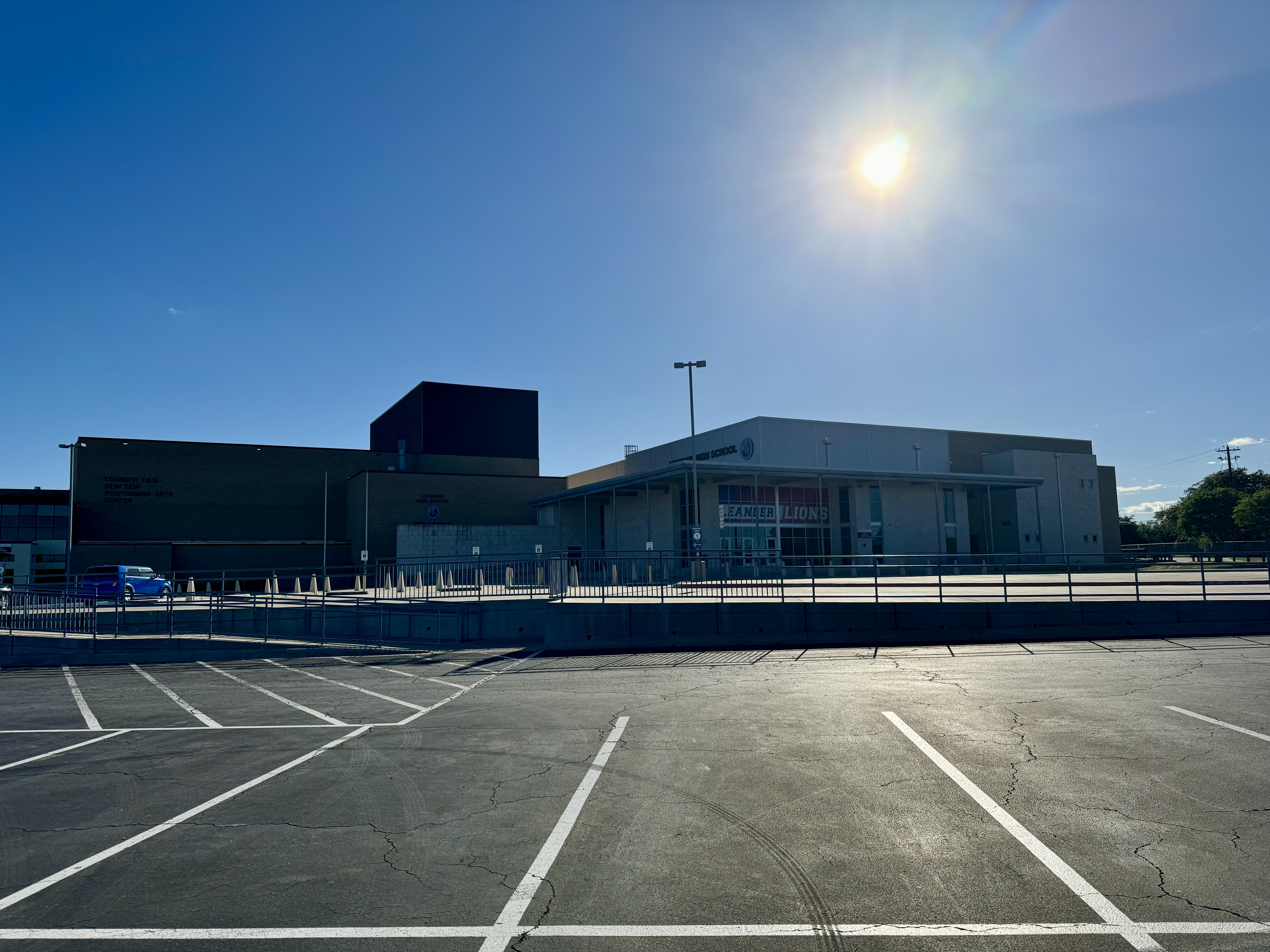
- Leander High School in 2024

Location
- 3301 S. Bagdad Road; Leander, TX 78641; United States; 30.53772°N 97.851°W

Information
- Type: Public
- Established: 1983
- School district: Leander Independent School District
- Principal: Chris Simpson
- Teaching staff: 148.86
- Grades: 9–12
- Enrollment: 2,265 (2025-2026)
- Student to teacher ratio: 14.90
- Campus type: Suburban
- Colors: Blue, white, and red
- Athletics conference: UIL Class 6A (2026-), Class 5A (2020-2026), Class 6A (2016-2020) Class 5A (2014-2016) Class 4A (2012-2014) Class 5A (2004-2012)
- Mascot: Lion
- Website: lhs.leanderisd.org

Leander High School is a secondary school in Leander, Texas, United States, and is part of the Leander Independent School District. It was established in 1983 and was the only high school in district, until the establishment of Cedar Park High School in 1998.

The school has a freshman enrollment of 600 students and is accredited by the Texas Education Agency. Historically the school served a mainly rural population, but starting in the early 1990s the area experienced growth due to expansion of high tech industries in the nearby Austin area. In 1999, the school became an International Baccalaureate school.

As of 2017, the school principal is Chris Simpson.

The school's mascots are Leo the Lion and Leah the Lion. The school colors are blue, white, and red.

== Demographics ==
The demographic breakdown of the 2,265 students enrolled for the 2025-2026 school year was:

- Male - 50%
- Female - 50%
- White - 45.4%
- Hispanic - 31.9%
- Asian - 11.2%
- Black - 5.6%
- Two or More Races - 5.2%
- American Indian/Alaska Native - 0.5%
- Native Hawaiian/Pacific Islander - 0.2%

== Athletics ==
- Baseball
- Basketball (men's and women's)
- Cheerleading
- Cross country
- Drill Team
- Football
- Golf (men's and women's)
- Softball
- Soccer
- Swimming
- Tennis
- Track and field
- Volleyball
- Wrestling
- Marching band

=== Football ===
Since the early 1930s, Leander has had a presence in Texas high school football. Since 1942, it has had 17 playoff appearances.

The 1942 season was the first time that Leander made an appearance in the playoffs after being named district champions. They were eliminated after losing to Marble Falls 0-26.

In 1955, Leander went 8-1-1 in the regular season, falling only to Thrall High School. They entered bi-district, but fell to Troy High School 0-12.

In 1959, Leander went 4-5-1, before advancing to the bi-district game against Johnson City High; they fell 6-8.

The Lions made their fourth playoff appearance in 1967. They went 8–2, advancing to the playoffs after losing only to Salado and Thorndale. In the bi-district game, they again fell to Salado with a score of 28–14.

With their best season since the team's founding, the 1969 Lions went 9–1 in the regular season. They advanced to bi-district and played Mart High School, but fell 0-37.

After 27 years without making it to the playoffs, Leander returned to a bi-district game in 1996 with a record of 7–2–1. They were knocked out of the playoffs after a 0–14 loss to Killeen Ellison.

In 2001, the Lions made it to the bi-district game against Killeen, but lost 3–21.

The 2002 season was the first time Leander won a playoff game after beating Copperas Cove 45-27 in the bi-district game. They advanced to area playoffs, but lost to Spring High School 26-28.

In 2003 Leander went 9–1, and were able to advance to playoffs. Leander first beat Belton 14-13 in the bi-district game, before advancing to the area game against Cypress Springs, who they topped 31-7. Leander then faced Dallas Carter and beat them 11-9. For their final playoff game of the season, Leander faced Allen High School in the state 5A quarterfinals. Allen held a constant lead throughout the game, and Leander was defeated 49–35.

After failing to make the playoffs in 2004, the 2005 team went 9–1 and were named district champions. They played Bastrop in the bi-district game, and advanced to area after beating the Bears 39–13. They appeared in the area game against the undefeated Copperas Cove team, and were defeated 42–28.

In 2006, Leander was named district champion and made it to the bi-district game against Ellison. They beat the Eagles 49-22, then moved to the area game against Klein Forest who they beat 35-24. Leander played Garland in the regional game, but were defeated 24–27.

=== Basketball ===
Currently, Leander has four basketball teams: Varsity, Junior Varsity, 9th A, and 9th B.

=== Baseball ===
Leander has three baseball teams: Varsity, JV Blue and JV Red.

== Fine arts ==
- Band
- Choir
- Dance
- Theatre

=== Band ===
The Leander High School Band's accolades include:

- Bands of America Grand National Class AAA Champion – 2016, 2019
- UIL State Marching Contest finalist – 1988, 1989, 1993, 1996, 2000, 2015, 2016, 2018, 2021, 2023, 2024
- UIL State Marching Band Bronze Medalist – 1988, 1989, 2015, 2021, 2024
- UIL State Marching Band Silver Medalist - 1993
- Tournament of Roses Parade – 1997
- Winter Guard International World Champion – 2018
- TMEA State Honor Band – 1994
- TMEA State Honor Band Finalist - 1988, 1990, 1992
- Three-time State Championship Color Guard – 2013, 2014, 2018
- Consistent UIL Concert Band Sweepstakes recipients (Consecutive UIL Annual Sweepstakes Awards since Spring, 1987)
- 34 consecutive years of perfect Division 1 ratings at the UIL Marching Contest (2019)
- Four Time Bands Of America Grand National Finalist (1999, 2016, 2019, 2024)

== Clubs and organizations ==
=== Robotics ===
The Leander High School robotics team has won many different awards over the years. Students of any background may join, even if they have no knowledge of robotics.

=== Newspaper ===
The Roar is Leander's online newspaper. It was founded in 2009.

=== Yearbook ===
Leander's yearbook, "The Lair," has been in publication since 1946, providing a comprehensive record of student life, achievements, and school events.

=== Air Force JROTC ===
Leander High School offers an Air Force Junior Reserve Officer Training Corps class for grades 9-12.

=== Blue Belles Dance Team ===
The blue belles is the varsity dance/drill team at Leander Highschool. They perform at all Varsity football games, some basketball games and pep rallies. They also host their own shows a holiday show and spring show. And they host a dance competition WDC. The team consist of Sophomores-Seniors. There is also a JV performance co. The Sapphires.

== Notable alumni ==
=== Football players ===
- Blake Gideon, NFL player
- Dane Krager, NFL player
- Paul Thompson, NFL player
- Torri Williams, NFL player

=== Baseball players ===
- Michael Reed, MLB player
- Mason Montgomery, MLB player

=== Others ===
- Liz Hatch, cyclist
- MJ Hegar, politician
- Kyle Park, musician
- Ramesh Srivastava, lead singer of Voxtrot
