= Ramesh Srivastava =

American singer and songwriter (born 1983)

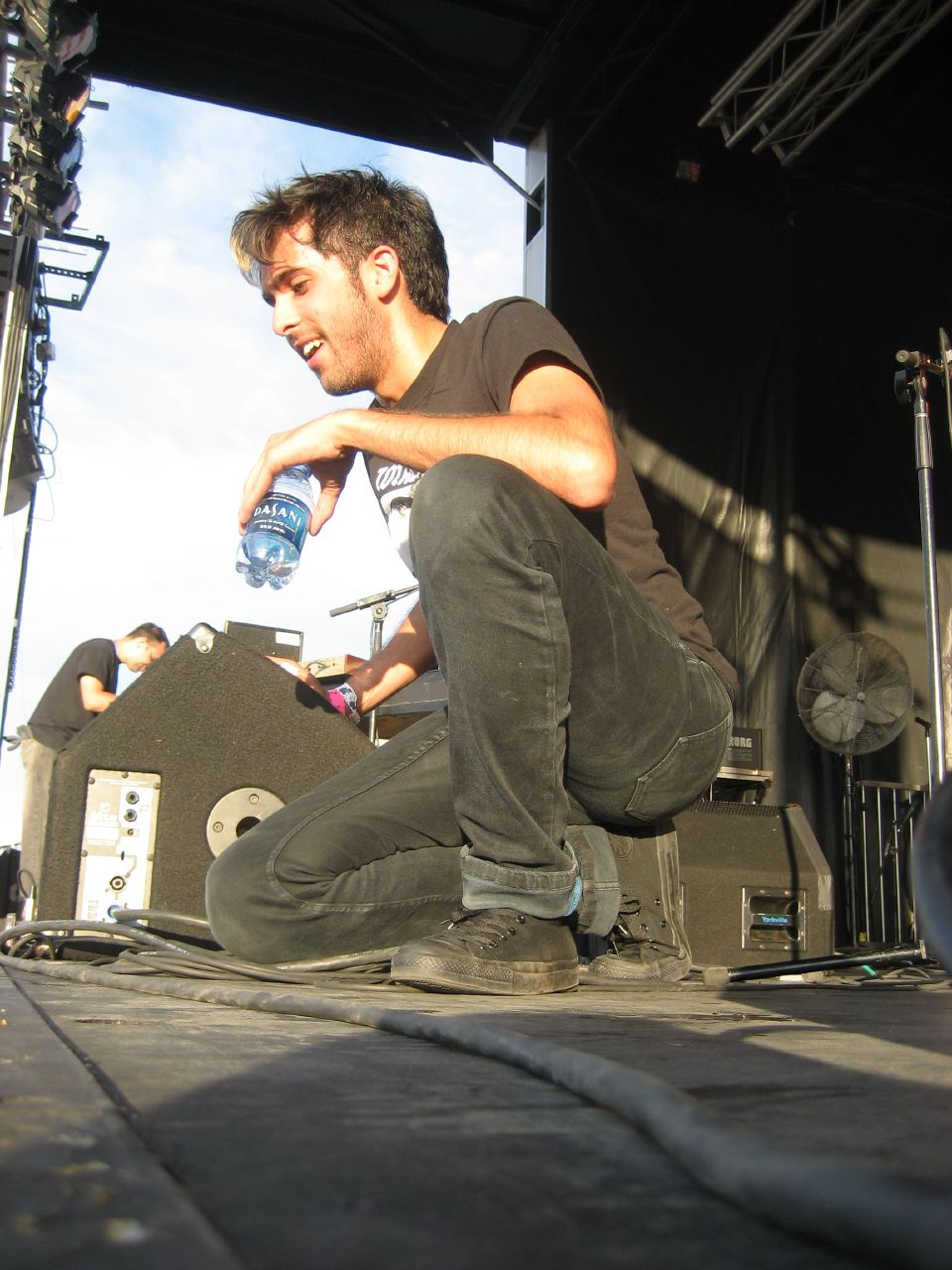
- Srivastava performing with Voxtrot, 2007

Background information
- Born: Ramesh McLean Srivastava; June 26, 1983 (age 43); Austin, Texas, U.S.
- Genres: Indie rock; indie pop
- Occupation: Musician
- Instruments: Vocals; guitar; piano
- Years active: 2003–present
- Labels: Beggars Banquet Records; Austin Town Hall
- Member of: Voxtrot

Ramesh McLean Srivastava (born June 26, 1983) is an American singer and songwriter. He is perhaps best known as the lead vocalist of the indie rock band Voxtrot, active from 2003 to 2010. After the dissolution of Voxtrot, Srivastava has also released solo material under his name, including his debut album, The King, in 2014.

== Early life ==
Ramesh Srivastava was born on June 26, 1983, in Austin, Texas, to Patricia Noel Goettel and Rajendra Kumar Srivastava. His father is from Lucknow, Uttar Pradesh, while his mother is American, from New Jersey. He attended Leander High School in Leander, Texas, and later attended the University of Glasgow in Glasgow, Scotland, majoring in literature.

== Career ==
In 2002, after graduating from college and returning to Texas, Srivastava formed the band Voxtrot in Austin. They recorded one extended play and released a self-titled album, which garnered critical acclaim. In 2010, the group disbanded, with Srivastava stating that their career trajectory had been one of "long, simmering build, explosion, and almost instantaneous decay." The band played what was believed to be their final show at the Bowery Ballroom in New York City on June 26, 2010, Srivastava's twenty-seventh birthday.

In 2014, Srivastava released his first solo record, The King. The record was performed live as a four-piece on a nationwide tour of Japan. On May 6, 2022, Voxtrot announced they were embarking on a reunion tour through the latter part of the year, along with the release of archival recordings.

== Personal life ==
In 2007, the Dallas Voice published an article in which it was implied that Srivastava was gay, though a subsequent article by the same publication stated that this was unsubstantiated. In June 2020, Srivastava confirmed publicly in an Instagram post that he is gay.

== Discography ==
=== Voxtrot ===
Extended plays

- Raised by Wolves (2005)
- Your Biggest Fan (2006)
- Mothers, Sisters, Daughters & Wives (2006)

Albums

- Voxtrot (2007)
- Dreamers in Exile (2026)

=== Ramesh ===
- The King (2014)

== See also ==
- Voxtrot
