= Tyler Patmon =

American football player (born 1991)

No. 20, 26, 29, 23
- Position: Cornerback

Personal information
- Born: January 26, 1991 (age 35); Round Rock, Texas, U.S.
- Listed height: 5 ft 10 in (1.78 m)
- Listed weight: 188 lb (85 kg)

Career information
- High school: Vista Ridge (Cedar Park, Texas)
- College: Kansas (2009–2011); Oklahoma State (2012–2013)
- NFL draft: 2014: undrafted

Career history
- Dallas Cowboys (2014–2015); Miami Dolphins (2015); Tennessee Titans (2016)*; Kansas City Chiefs (2016)*; Carolina Panthers (2016–2017)*; Jacksonville Jaguars (2017–2018); Miami Dolphins (2019)*
- * Offseason or practice squad member only

Career NFL statistics
- Total tackles: 39
- Pass deflections: 8
- Interceptions: 1
- Defensive touchdowns: 1
- Stats at Pro Football Reference

Tyler Patmon (born January 26, 1991) is an American former professional football player who was a cornerback in the National Football League (NFL). He played college football for the Kansas Jayhawks and Oklahoma State Cowboys before signing with the Dallas Cowboys as an undrafted free agent in 2014. He was also a member of the Miami Dolphins, Tennessee Titans, Kansas City Chiefs, Carolina Panthers, and Jacksonville Jaguars.

== Early life ==
Patmon attended Vista Ridge High School, where he was a two-way player at cornerback and wide receiver. As a junior, he registered 45 tackles, one interception, 11 passes defensed and one forced fumble. He received All-district first-team honors.

As a senior, he tallied 37 tackles, 2 interceptions, 2 passes defensed, 7 receptions for 113 yards, 2 receiving touchdowns, one blocked punt and 2 blocked field goals after only playing in 3 games before tearing his meniscus. He received All-district first-team honors.

He also earned academic All-district honors and was a state qualifier in track.

== College career ==
=== Kansas ===
Patmon accepted a football scholarship from the University of Kansas, where he was a three-year starter. As a redshirted freshman, he started 9 games at nickel back, collecting 45 tackles, 5.5 tackles for loss (tied for second on the team), one sack, 2 interceptions (tied for the team lead), 10 passed defensed (led the team) and 2 fumble recoveries (one returned for a touchdown). He had 7 tackles against Oklahoma State University. He received Academic All-Big 12 honors.

As a sophomore, he appeared in 11 games with 7 starts at cornerback. He posted 43 tackles (tied for seventh on the team), 2 tackles for loss, one interception and 4 passes defensed (second on the team). He had 7 tackles and one quarterback hurry against the University of Oklahoma. He made 6 tackles (one for loss) and one quarterback hurry against the University of Texas.

As a junior, he started 12 games, recording 58 tackles (fourth on the team), 4 tackles for loss, 3 interceptions (tied for the team lead), 8 passes defensed and one sack. He had 8 tackles (one for loss) against Texas Tech University. He made 8 tackle (2 for loss) and one sack against West Virginia University.

Patmon finished his Jayhawk career with 142 tackles, 11.5 tackles for loss, 22 passes defensed and 6 interceptions.

=== Oklahoma State ===
In 2013, Patmon transferred to Oklahoma State University to play football, after finishing his junior season, completing his undergraduate studies and mentioning that the decision was "not by choice".

As a senior, he appeared in 13 games with 5 starts, registering 30 tackles (4 for loss), 9 passes defensed, one interception, one forced fumble and one recovery fumble. He returned a fumble for a 78-yard touchdown against Baylor University.

== Professional career ==
=== Dallas Cowboys ===
After not being selected in the 2014 NFL draft, he received a tryout invitation by the Dallas Cowboys for rookie-minicamp where he performed well enough to be signed as an undrafted free agent on May 21. He made the team over former fourth round draft choice B. W. Webb. During training camp, Patmon was involved in a widely publicized altercation with wide receiver Dez Bryant on August 2, 2015. The scuffle drew national media attention after video of the incident was released, but both players downplayed the fight, calling it a result of intense competition. He debuted on September 7, against the San Francisco 49ers.

As a rookie, he missed three games with knee and ankle injuries and was active for eleven. He was used in the nickel defense and his playing time increased during the team's final four games. On November 2, Patmon scored his first career touchdown against the Arizona Cardinals, after returning an interception off Carson Palmer 58 yards to the end zone.

In 2015, he was named the team's nickel cornerback after having a strong training camp and Orlando Scandrick suffering a season ending knee injury. Patmon changed his number from 20 to 26. He was passed on the depth chart by Corey White in the fifth game of the season against the New England Patriots and was declared inactive for the next two weeks. He regained his role in the eighth game of the season against the Philadelphia Eagles, but was not able to make a noticeable difference in the team's defensive play. On December 15, he was waived to make room for cornerback Terrance Mitchell, finishing with 11 games played, 15 tackles and 6 passes defensed (at the time third on the team). The Cowboys offered him a chance to join their practice squad, but he decided to sign with a different team.

=== Miami Dolphins ===
On December 17, 2015, Patmon was signed to the Miami Dolphins' practice squad. On December 26, he was promoted to the 53-man roster and appeared in two games during the season. On July 31, 2016, Patmon was released by the Dolphins.

=== Tennessee Titans ===
On August 1, 2016, Patmon was claimed off waivers by the Tennessee Titans to improve the team's depth, after cornerbacks Brice McCain and Bennett Okotcha were injured. He was released by the team on August 28.

=== Kansas City Chiefs ===
On October 20, 2016, Patmon was signed to the Kansas City Chiefs' practice squad. He was released on November 2, and although he was re-signed to the practice squad on November 8, he was cut the next day.

=== Carolina Panthers ===
On November 22, 2016, Patmon was signed to the Carolina Panthers' practice squad. He was signed to a reserve/future contract by Carolina on January 2, 2017. Patmon was waived by the Panthers on May 1.

=== Jacksonville Jaguars ===
On May 22, 2017, Patmon was signed by the Jacksonville Jaguars. He appeared in 13 games as a backup cornerback and had 4 tackles. In 2018, he appeared in 12 games with 2 starts, making 14 tackles (one for loss) and one pass defensed. Patmon missed one game with a neck injury, and wasn't re-signed after the season.

=== Miami Dolphins (second stint) ===
On July 22, 2019, Patmon was signed by the Miami Dolphins. He was released during final roster cuts on August 31.
