= Mason Brooks =

American football player (born 1999)

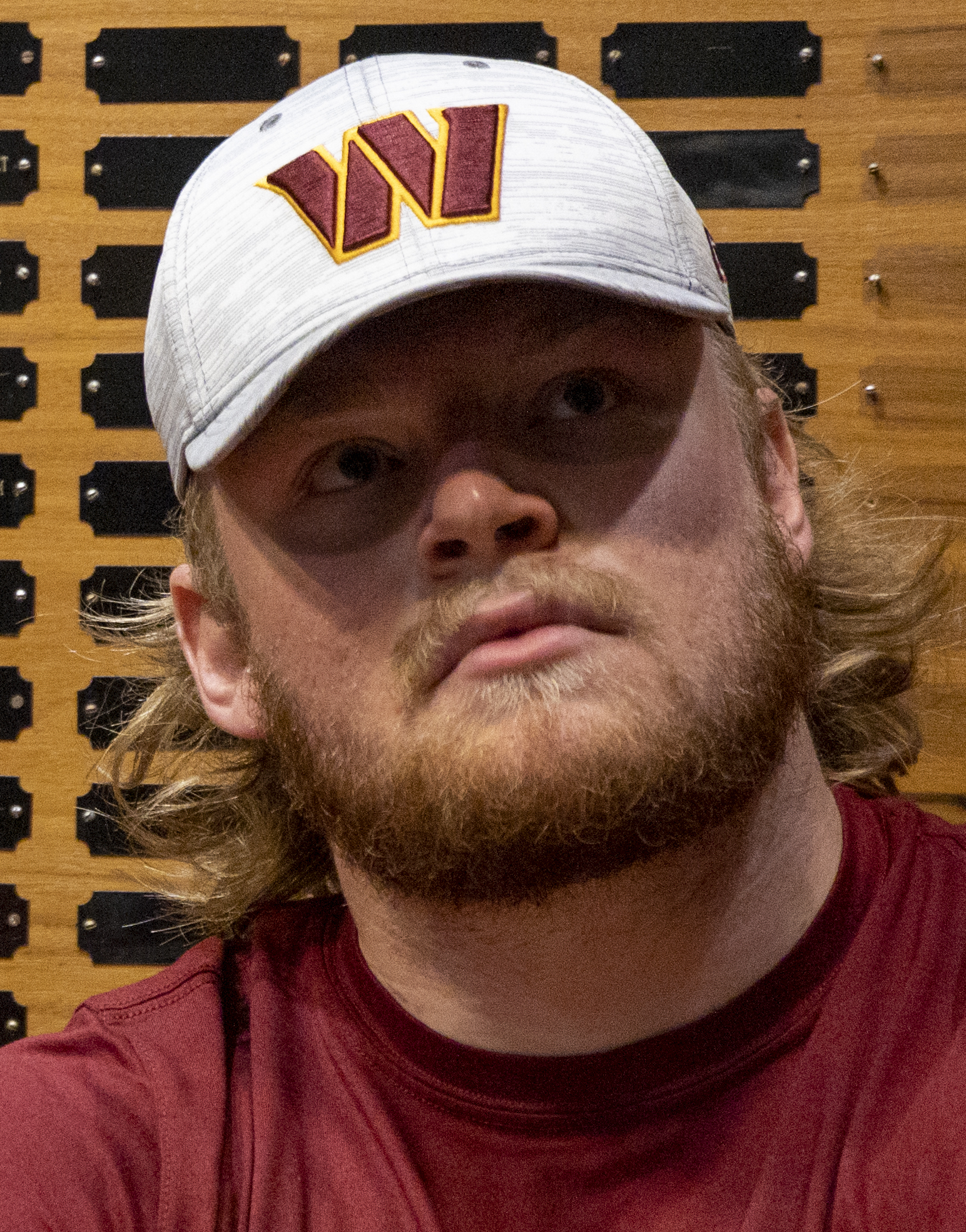
- Brooks with the Washington Commanders in 2023

Profile
- Position: Offensive tackle

Personal information
- Born: October 11, 1999 (age 27); Cedar Park, Texas, U.S.
- Listed height: 6 ft 6 in (1.98 m)
- Listed weight: 315 lb (143 kg)

Career information
- High school: Cedar Park
- College: Western Kentucky (2018–2021); Ole Miss (2022)
- NFL draft: 2023: undrafted

Career history
- Washington Commanders (2023–2024)*; Carolina Panthers (2024)*; Indianapolis Colts (2024)*; DC Defenders (2025); Miami Dolphins (2025)*; Birmingham Sallions (2026)
- * Offseason or practice squad member only

Awards and highlights
- UFL champion (2025); First-team All-Conference USA (2021)
- Stats at Pro Football Reference

Mason Barrett Brooks (born October 11, 1999) is an American professional football offensive tackle. He played college football for the Western Kentucky Hilltoppers and Ole Miss Rebels prior to signing with the Washington Commanders as an undrafted free agent in 2023.

== Early life ==
Brooks grew up in Cedar Park, Texas and attended Cedar Park High School. He was rated a two-star recruit and committed to play college football at Western Kentucky over offers from Abilene Christian, Lamar, Liberty, McNeese State and Sam Houston State.

== College career ==
=== Western Kentucky ===
During Brooks's true freshman season in 2018, he played in seven games at reserve left tackle and finished the season with 1 solo stop. During the 2019 season, he played in 12 games and finished the season with 14 total offensive snaps. During the 2020 season, he played in and started all 12 games and finished the season with 764 offensive snaps. During the 2021 season, he played in and started 11 games.

On December 13, 2021, Brooks announced that he would be entering the transfer portal. On January 17, 2022, he announced that he would be transferring to Ole Miss.

=== Ole Miss ===
During the 2022 season, Brooks played in all 13 games at both reserve offensive lineman and on special teams with the field goal and extra point unit.

== Professional career ==
Pre-draft measurables
Height	Weight	Arm length	Hand span	Wingspan	Vertical jump	Broad jump	Bench press
6 ft 5 1/2 in (1.97 m)	302 lb (137 kg)	33 3/4 in (0.86 m)	10 1/2 in (0.27 m)	6 ft 8 3/4 in (2.05 m)	31 in (0.79 m)	9 ft 1 in (2.77 m)	21 reps
All values from Pro Day

Brooks was selected by the Memphis Showboats fourth overall in the 2023 USFL draft.

=== Washington Commanders ===
On April 30, 2023, Brooks was signed to the Washington Commanders as an undrafted free agent after going unselected in the 2023 NFL draft. Brooks was released on August 29, but was signed to the team's practice squad the next day. Brooks re-signed on February 22, 2024. Brooks was released by the Commanders on August 14.

=== Carolina Panthers ===
Brooks was claimed off waivers by the Carolina Panthers on August 15, 2024. He was waived on August 27, and re-signed to the practice squad. Brooks was cut again three days later.

=== Indianapolis Colts ===
On November 12, 2024, Brooks was signed to the Indianapolis Colts practice squad.

=== DC Defenders ===
On February 17, 2025, Brooks signed with the DC Defenders of the United Football League (UFL). He was placed on injured reserve on June 2.

=== Miami Dolphins ===
On August 19, 2025, Brooks signed with the Miami Dolphins. He was waived on August 26 as part of final roster cuts.
