= Texas Psychological Association =

The Texas Psychological Association (TPA) is a professional association representing psychologists in the U.S. state of Texas. It was established in 1947 and is headquartered in Cedar Park, Texas.

== About TPA ==
The declared purpose of the Texas Psychological Association is to advance the field of psychology as a science, profession, and means of promoting human welfare. The TPA is a state affiliate of the American Psychological Association. For full membership of the TPA, a PhD degree in psychology is required, and for associate membership, a master's degree in psychology is needed. The TPA is governed by an elected executive committee. It was incorporated in December 1964. It concentrates on multiple aspects of psychology such as applied psychology, school psychology, and psychologists' trainers.

Texas Psychologist is the quarterly journal of TPA.

== History ==
The TPA was established on September 28, 1947, and the first annual meeting of the association was held in February 1948.

The original sixty members of the association shared scientific information through research and presentations at annual meetings of the association. The association concentrated on professional practice aspects of the discipline as licensure, education of practitioners, and applications of psychology in direct human services by the early 1960s. The early history of the association was dominated by the experimental psychologists from university faculties, but later they were replaced by the practicing psychologists.

The legislative committee of the association achieved passage of the Psychologist's Certification and Licensing Act, a statewide certification and licensing law for psychologists, in 1969. The law established the Texas State Board of Examiners of Psychologists, and it took effect in 1970.

In 1987 an executive director was hired by the association after its membership reached 2,000. It also rented office space at Austin, Texas. As the members and staff of the TPA expanded, the associations' influence with the legislature improved.
