= Cedar Park High School =

Coordinates: 30.472°N 97.844°W

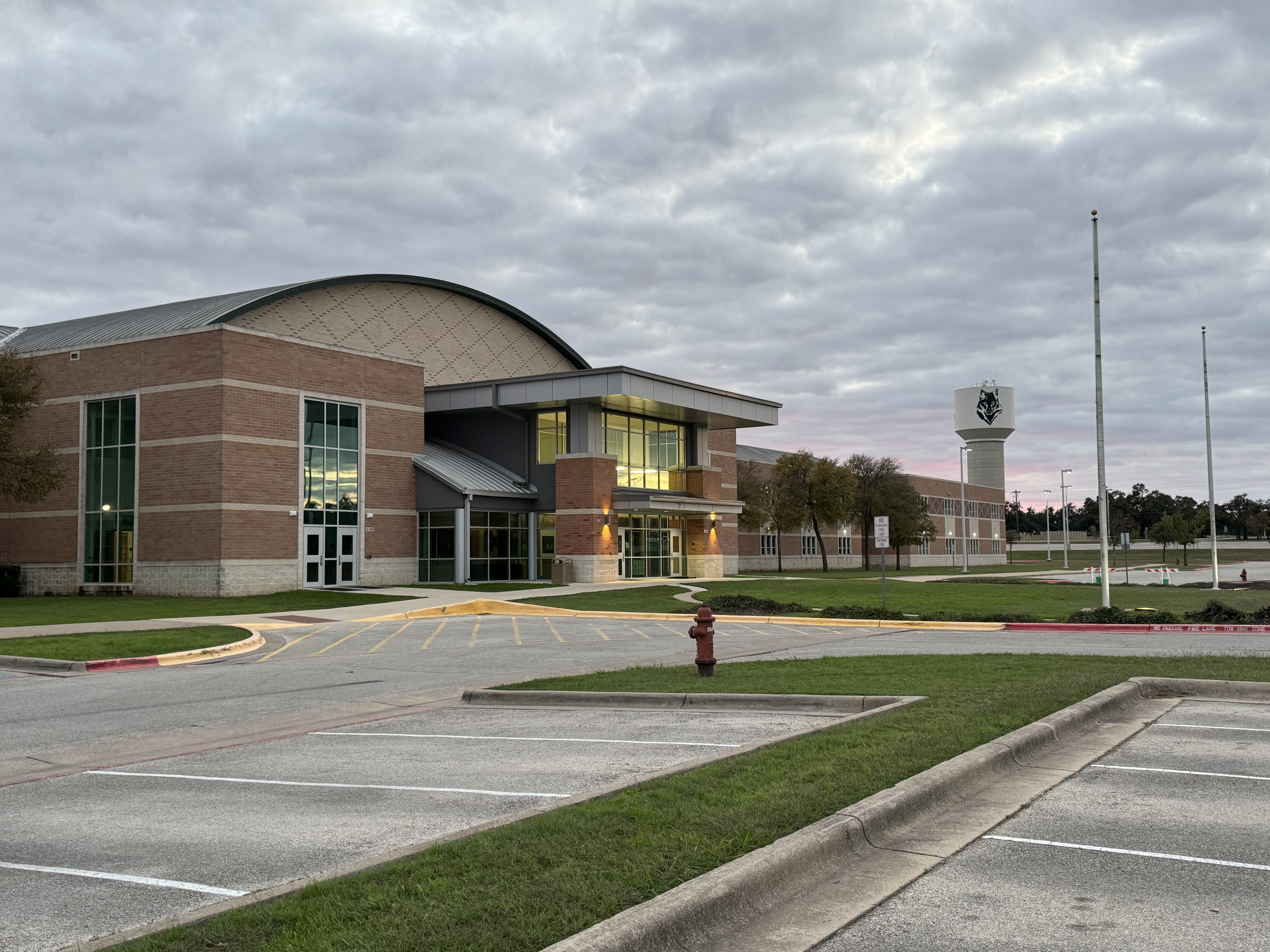
- 2150 Cypress Creek Road; Cedar Park, TX 78613; United States

Information
- Type: Public
- Established: 1998
- School district: Leander Independent School District
- Principal: John Sloan
- Teaching staff: 125.97 (FTE)
- Grades: 9–12
- Enrollment: 2,304 (2025-2026)
- Student to teacher ratio: 15.38
- Colors: Forest green, black, and silver
- Athletics conference: UIL Class 6A (2026-), Class 5A (2014–2026), Class 4A (2010–2014), Class 5A (2004–2010)
- Mascot: Timberwolf
- Newspaper: The Wolfpack
- Website: cphs.leanderisd.org

Cedar Park High School (CPHS) is a high school in Cedar Park, Texas. It was established in 1998 to serve as the second high school in the Leander Independent School District due to the rapid growth in the area. The school received an overall rating of "A" from the Texas Education Agency for the 2024-2025 school year.

The school's mascot is the timberwolf, and the colors of CPHS are Forest Green, Silver, and Black. The school competes in the UIL district.

== Demographics ==
The demographic breakdown of the 2,304 students enrolled for the 2025-2026 school year was:

- Male - 50%
- Female - 50%
- White - 60.3%
- Hispanic - 21.8%
- Asian - 9.8%
- Two or More Races - 5.2%
- Black - 2.3%
- American Indian/Alaska Native - 0.4%
- Native Hawaiian/Pacific Islander - 0.1%

== Organizations and athletics ==
=== Football ===
Cedar Park, along with Vandegrift High School, are the two schools in Leander Independent School District to win a UIL Football state title. They play at John Gupton Stadium, in Cedar Park, Texas.

In 2012, Cedar Park hired Joe Willis as their new head coach. The team became the 2012 UIL 4A (Division 2) state finalist. After the final playoff game on December 21, 2012, Cedar Park became the 2012 state champions.

In 2014, Cedar Park went to the state championship once (in UIL 5A division 2) again and became the runner-up in the state, after an undefeated season and playoff run.

In 2015, Cedar Park hired Carl Abseck as their new head coach. On December 19, 2015, CPHS won their second state title, defeating Frisco Lone Star 22–6.

In 2020, Cedar Park went to the UIL 5A Division 1 state championship and became runner-up in the state, losing to Denton Ryan 41-10.

In 2021, Carl Abseck left Cedar Park because he was hired by Barbers Hill High School, Cedar Park was 71-10 under Abseck.

=== Girls soccer ===
In 2025, the Cedar Park girls soccer team won the 5A D2 state championship. Cedar Park beat Frisco Wakeland in the state championship, ending Wakeland's 54-game unbeaten streak.

=== Baseball ===
The Cedar Park Timberwolf baseball team has made the playoffs every year since 2013 (with the exception of 2020). Cedar Park has been a consistent playoff team throughout the 2010s.

In 2023, Cedar Park hired Tyler Frost as their new baseball head coach. Cedar Park went 25-13-2 and made the playoffs. They were the 5A Region IV area champion that year. However, they would lose in the regional quarter finals against Rouse High School 9-8 in a Rouse comeback.

In 2024, Cedar Park went 28-8-2 under coach Frost. Cedar Park made the UIL 2024 Baseball 5A playoffs, with Cedar Park beating Pieper 2-0 and Medina Valley 2-0 before losing again to Rouse in the regional quarter finals 0-2. Following this, Tyler Frost stepped down as head coach.

=== Boys' basketball ===
The Cedar Park Timberwolves Boys' basketball team, led by head coach Blake Brown, has had ten straight post season appearances, three district appearances, and two appearances in the UIL Boys State basketball tournament.

In the 2014–2015 season, they became the champions of District 25-AAAAA with a district record of 13–1. They made a run through the UIL playoffs that ended in the state semi-finals on March 12, 2015, in the Alamodome with a 57–46 loss to Beaumont Ozen.

In 2018, Cedar Park was at the 5A Region III District 17 champions regional quarterfinals, but Cedar Park would lose to Manor in the playoffs 46-41.

In 2019, Cedar Park got to the 5A Region III District 17 champions area. However, Cedar Park would lose to Lake Creek in the playoffs 52-44.

Cedar Park has failed to make the playoffs from 2020-2022.

In 2023, Cedar Park went 19-14 in the regular season and making the playoffs for the first time in 3 years. Cedar Park would up losing in the bi-district playoffs 52-33 to Boerne-Champion High School.

=== Girls' basketball ===
In 2017, Cedar Park hired Donny Ott as their new girls' basketball head coach. In Ott first year, Cedar Park in 1st in the district going 16-0, and 30-8 overall. Cedar Park made the playoffs but would lose to Crosby High School (Texas) 53-47 in the playoffs.

In the 2020-2021 season, the team the team won the 5A state championship, beating Frisco Liberty 46-39. This was the first time that Leander Independent School District sent a girls' basketball team to the state tournament. The following year, the team won the 5A state championship again, beating Frisco Memorial 45-40 in double overtime. The girls had a 62-game winning streak and were the first Austin-area team to have a perfect season.

In 2023, Donny Ott was hired by Summer Creek High School. Ott amassed a 157-17 overall record with a 68-0 district record, 4 regional tournament appearances in 5 years, 22-3 playoff record, and 2 Class 5A State UIL championships, and back to back accomplishments during the 2020-2021 and 2021-2022 seasons. Coach Ott and his staff have received district coach of the year honors, Central Texas coach of the year honors, TGCA and TABC Coach of the Year honors as well as the Sectional National Coach of the Year during the 2021-2022.

In 2023, Cedar Park hired Kami Williamson as their new head coach. She became the female 5A/6A coach of the year and led the team to the UIL Texas state tournament. The team lost in the semi-finals to Mansfield Timberview, ending their season. In their playoff run, they defeated Liberty Hill HS (2nd in district) and Glenn HS (1st in district) to advance to the state tournament.

=== Marching band ===
Cedar Park High School's timberwolf marching band plays a notable role in the school's culture. They have made a number of national appearances which include Bands of America (BOA) Grand Nationals, University Interscholastic League (UIL) Marching Contest, and others. The band has won 9 state titles, holding the title of most marching band state titles won in Texas.

Most of the Cedar Park High School Timberwolf marching band's success came under the direction of their former, director of bands, Steve Wessels. During his tenure at Cedar Park, the band won UIL 4A / 5A state marching contest in 2001, 2011, 2015, 2017, and from 2019 through 2025. They also won multiple UIL and TMEA accolades, along with a Sudler Shield in 2007. Their director, Steve Wessels, received an award for his directing in 2018 and 2020. Steve retired in 2020, completing thirty-four years as a Texas Music Educator. In 2020, Christopher Yee was named the new director of the band.

The band has been a finalist at UIL State and Bands of America Regional and Super Regional marching band competitions. The band is also a three-time Bands of America Marching Band Grand National Finalist, placing 10th in 2010, 5th in 2016, and 5th in 2024, also being named Class 3A National Champion in 2024. The Cedar Park High School Timberwolf band was crowned the 2001 UIL State 4A Marching Band Champion and in 2011. In 2013, the band was awarded the silver medal at the UIL 4A State Competition. In 2015, 2017, 2019, 2021, 2023, 2024, and most recently 2025, the band was crowned the UIL 5A State marching band champions. The Cedar Park High School percussion group has won multiple Lonestar Classic "State Championships". The color guard won 1st place in the 2011 Texas Color Guard Circuit State Championship. The band won their first Bands of America Championship title in 2021 at that year's BOA Waco competition.

=== Cross country ===
The Cedar Park Timberwolves boys' cross country running team took eighth place at the 2008 Nike Cross National championships and were ranked number 1 in the nation for boys' cross country as of Oct. 2, 2009. The boys' team won state in 2010.

=== Boys' lacrosse ===
The Cedar Park Timberwolves boys' 2008 team posted a 7-0 district record and went 16-2 overall. The team made it to the state championship, falling to the eventual champion, Highland Park, 10-8 in the state semifinal.

=== Robotics ===
Cedar Park High School is home to the FIRST Robotics Competition team 5052 and the FIRST Tech Challenge team 14361. The team was started in 2014 and went to world championships, while Team 14361 was founded in 2018. The following year they won Innovate 1 for GEMS league and Central Texas league. They are also 5A UIL State champions and FTC Texas State Control 1 winners.

=== Journalism ===
Cedar Park High School's online newspaper, The Wolfpack, was ranked #8 for Distinguished Sites by School Newspapers Online with a total of 33 articles listed on Best of SNO in 2019. Both the yearbook and CPHS News Broadcast each received Bronze Stars in the 2022 ILPC ratings. In addition, the school's journalism programs have been recognized multiple times for UIL student leader awards, including Producer of the Year, Yearbook Editor of the Year, and twice for Online Newspaper Editor of the Year.

=== UIL Academics ===
The school competes in UIL Academics District 25 in speech & debate, social studies, literature, journalism, and STEM competitions. Cedar Park was the district champion team in 2022, and third at the regional meet and fourth at the state meet. The school also won the journalism team state championship in 2022. During the 2023 season, Cedar Park was the district champion team, as well as the regional champion team. As for State, Cedar Park was the third place team, though Cedar Park Social Studies team was second in the State Social Studies competition.

== Notable alumni ==
- Mason Brooks, National Football League player
- Josh Cameron, College football player
- Spencer Drango, National Football League player
- Chris Paddack, Major League Baseball player
- Quinton Smith, National Football League player
