= Leander Independent School District =

School district in Texas

Address
- 204 W. South Street Leander, Texas, 78646; United States
- Coordinates: 30.5417°N 97.8939°W

District information
- Type: Public
- Motto: Leading to a Bright Future
- Grades: Pre-K–12
- Superintendent: Dr. Chris Clark
- Schools: 52
- NCES District ID: 4827030

Students and staff
- Students: 42,593(2023–2024)
- Teachers: 3,063.12 (on an FTE basis)
- Student–teacher ratio: 13.91:1

Other information
- Website: www.leanderisd.org

Leander Independent School District is a school district based in Leander, Texas (USA) and covering a total of 200 square miles (520 km^{2}) in Leander, Cedar Park, Georgetown, Jonestown, and Round Rock in Williamson County, as well as northwest Austin in Travis County. In 2015, the school district was rated "Met Standards" by the Texas Education Agency.

The district has a "CollegeConnection" arrangement with Austin Community College.

As of 2013 , LISD covers 25.6 square miles (66 km^{2}) of land within the City of Austin, making up 8% of the city's territory.

== Schools ==
=== High schools ===
- Cedar Park High School
- Glenn High School
- Leander High School
- Rouse High School
- Vandegrift High School
- Vista Ridge High School
- High School # 7 (opening fall 2029)

=== Middle schools ===
- Canyon Ridge Middle School
- Cedar Park Middle School
- Danielson Middle School
- Four Points Middle School
- Henry Middle School
- Leander Middle School (formerly Leander Junior High School)
- Running Brushy Middle School
- Stiles Middle School
- Wiley Middle School
- Middle School # 10 (opening 2030)

=== Elementary schools ===
- Akin Elementary School
- Bagdad Elementary School
- Block House Creek Elementary School
- Christine Camacho Elementary School
- Cox Elementary School
- Cypress Elementary School
- Deer Creek Elementary School
- Donald Lewis Hisle Elementary School
- Faubion Elementary School (Closing Summer 2026)
- Giddens Elementary School
- Grandview Hills Elementary School
- Knowles Elementary School
- Larkspur Elementary School
- Laura Welch Bush Elementary School
- Mason Elementary School
- Naumann Elementary School
- North Elementary School
- Parkside Elementary School
- Jim Plain Elementary School
- Pleasant Hill Elementary School
- Reagan Elementary School
- Reed Elementary School
- River Place Elementary School
- River Ridge Elementary School
- Rutledge Elementary School
- Steiner Ranch Elementary School
- Tarvin Elementary School
- Westside Elementary School
- Whitestone Elementary School
- Winkley Elementary School
- Elementary School # 31 (opening fall 2028)
- Elementary School # 32 (opening fall 2028)

=== Alternative schools ===
- Early College High School
- New Hope High School
- Leander Extended Opportunity Center (LEO)
- Ada Mae Faubion School for Early Childhood

=== Stadiums ===
- John Gupton Stadium
- A.C. Bible Jr. Stadium
- Ed W. Monroe Stadium

== Bus crash ==
On August 13th, 2025 (the first day of school for LISD) at approximately 3:15 p.m. CDT, one of the district's school buses crashed near the intersection of Nameless Road and Palomino Ranch Drive, carrying 42 students and the driver. The driver and 9 students were injured, and 2 students were airlifted from the scene. In October 2025, the National Transportation Safety Board (NTSB) issued urgent recommendations following its investigation of the crash. The report found that while the bus was equipped with seat belts, 36 of the 42 students were not restrained. As a result, the NTSB urged Texas and LISD to implement enforceable seat belt policies. LISD has since mandated that drivers verify all students are buckled before departure.
