= Raised by Wolves (EP) =

EP by Voxtrot
- Released: July 25, 2005
- Recorded: Craig Downing and Voxtrot
- Genre: Indie rock
- Length: 23:35
- Label: Cult Hero Records

Voxtrot chronology
| Raised by Wolves (2005) | Mothers, Sisters, Daughters & Wives (2006) |

Professional ratings
Review scores
| Source | Rating |
|---|---|
| AllMusic | 3.5/5 stars |
| Pitchfork | (7.8/10) |

Raised by Wolves is the debut EP by the indie rock band Voxtrot, released in 2005.

== Release ==
The title track of the EP was initially released as a 7" single by the Portland, Oregon-based independent label Magic Marker Records in 2005, featuring the b-side "They Never Mean What They Say". It subsequently received a compact disc release by Cult Hero Records on July 25, 2005 as a complete EP, featuring a total of four tracks.

== Critical response ==
Brian Howe of Pitchfork awarded the album a 7.8 out of 10 rating, while Rob Bolton of Exclaim! called the EP "a superb debut release." Tim Sendra of AllMusic awarded the EP four-and-a-half out of five stars, comparing it to the work of Belle and Sebastian, The Cure, and The Smiths, adding that it was "a pleasant and breezy introduction to a group for which indie pop fans should have high hopes."

== Track listing ==
CD (Cult Hero Records)
| No. | Title | Length |
|---|---|---|
| 1. | "Raised by Wolves" | 4:40 |
| 2. | "The Start of Something" | 4:31 |
| 3. | "Missing Pieces" | 5:17 |
| 4. | "Wrecking Force" | 4:48 |

7" (MMR-033)
| No. | Title | Length |
|---|---|---|
| 1. | "Raised by Wolves" | 4:40 |
| 2. | "They Never Mean What They Say" | 6:43 |

== Personnel ==
Musicians

- Ramesh Srivastava – vocals
- Jared Van Fleet – guitar
- Mitch Calvert – guitar
- Jason Chronis – bass
- Matt Simon – drums

Technical

- Craig Downing – production
- Voxtrot – production
