= Liz Hatch =

American cyclist (born 1980)

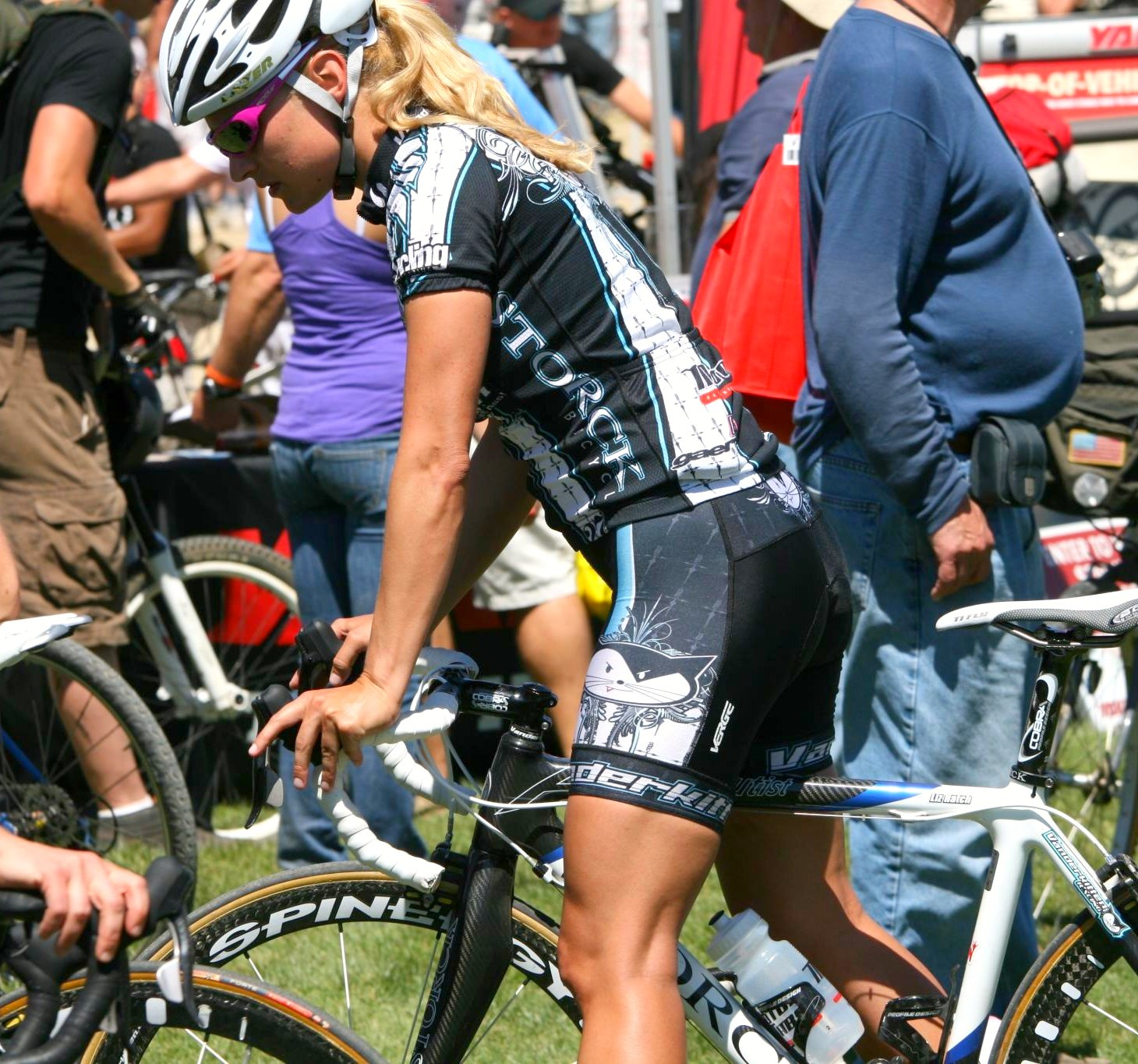
Liz Hatch

Liz Hatch (born June 3, 1980) is an American cyclist. She began racing in 2006 and made her first trip to Belgium that summer. Hatch became the first member of the Vanderkitten Racing team in 2007 but was released in the middle of 2009. For the 2010 season, she has signed with the Belgium-based Lotto Ladies professional team. Hatch drew additional recognition from Maxim magazine after appearing in a pictorial of the January 2008 issue.

== Early years ==
Liz Hatch was born in the United States in Leander, Texas. She attended Leander High School.

After retiring in 2011 Liz Hatch is making a comeback with the CyclelivePlus-Zannata Ladies Team
