= Glenn High School (Leander, Texas) =

Tom Glenn High School

Location
- 1320 Collaborative Way; Leander, TX 78641; United States; 30.5991°N 97.8822°W

Information
- Type: Public School
- Established: 2016
- School district: Leander Independent School District
- Principal: Josh Haug
- Staff: 105.71 (FTE)
- Grades: 9-12
- Enrollment: 1,994 (2025-2026)
- Student to teacher ratio: 15.01
- Campus: Suburban
- Colors: Navy, white, and orange
- Athletics conference: UIL Class 5A
- Team name: Grizzlies
- Website: ghs.leanderisd.org

Tom Glenn High School, commonly known as Glenn High School or simply GHS, is a high school located in Leander, Texas. It opened in the 2016–2017 school year as the sixth high school of Leander Independent School District. At the time of its opening, it was the northernmost high school in the district. The campus launched with only freshman and sophomore students, adding a grade level each subsequent year.

== Demographics ==
According to the National Center for Education Statistics (NCES), the demographic breakdown of the 1,994 students enrolled for the 2025-2026 school year was as follows:

- White: 41.5%
- Hispanic: 38.2%
- Black: 7.5%
- Asian: 6.6%
- Two or More Races: 5.4%
- American Indian/Alaska Native: 0.4%
- Native Hawaiian/Pacific Islander: 0.3%

== History ==
Tom Glenn High School was established to accommodate rapid growth in the northern part of the Leander Independent School District. On August 7, 2014, the Leander ISD Board of Trustees voted to name the campus after Tom Glenn, who served as the district's superintendent from 1987 to 2007. During Glenn’s 20-year tenure, the district grew from 4,600 students to more than 24,000.

The $97.5 million campus was designed by Pfluger Architects and built by American Constructors. The 436,000-square-foot facility opened on August 22, 2016, with an initial enrollment of approximately 582 students, consisting only of freshmen and sophomores. A formal dedication ceremony was held in the competition gym on September 17, 2016.
