= Your Biggest Fan (EP) =

EP by Voxtrot
- Released: November 17, 2006
- Studios: Cacophony Studios, Austin, Texas: Miloco Studios, London, England
- Genre: Indie pop
- Length: 13:11
- Labels: Playlouderecordings, Beggars Group
- Producer: Ben Hiller

Voxtrot chronology
Mothers, Sisters, Daughters & Wives EP (2006)	Your Biggest Fan (2006)	Voxtrot (2007)

Your Biggest Fan is the third official EP by the Austin, Texas-based indie pop band Voxtrot. Released on November 17, 2006, in the United States, it was available as both a three track CD and a two track 7" single.

The track "Trouble" was later released in the UK as a single.

== Critical response ==
Jack Rabid of AllMusic wrote: "Although Your Biggest Fan is weak-for-them Smiths-like piano pop further botched by producer Ben Hiller (Doves, Elbow) -- though the second half picks up a little -- both B-sides are better produced than the LP (sad, that!) and make the EP an important purchase, especially the onrushing "Trouble.""

== Track listings ==
CD
No.	Title	Length
1.	"Your Biggest Fan"	3:59
2.	"Trouble"	4:18
3.	"Sway"	4:54

7"
No.	Title	Length
1.	"Your Biggest Fan"	3:39
2.	"Sway"	4:54

== Personnel ==
Voxtrot

- Ramesh Srivastava – vocals, guitar
- Jared Van Fleet – guitar, strings
- Mitch Calvert – guitar
- Jason Chronis – bass
- Matt Simon – drums

Technical

- Erik Wofford – engineering
- Ben Hiller – production, mixing, engineering

Guest musicians

- Ames Asbell – viola
- Sara Nelson – cello
- Tracy Seeger – violin
- Jennifer Moore – backing vocals

Adapted from AllMusic and CD liner notes.
