= Blake Frazier =

American football player (born 2005)

No. 77 – Michigan Wolverines
- Position: Offensive tackle
- Class: Junior

Personal information
- Born: December 20, 2005 (age 20)
- Listed height: 6 ft 6 in (1.98 m)
- Listed weight: 302 lb (137 kg)

Career information
- High school: Vandegrift (Austin, Texas)
- College: Michigan (2024–present)
- Stats at ESPN

Blake Frazier (born December 20, 2005) is an American college football offensive tackle for the Michigan Wolverines.

== Early life ==
Frazier was born on December 20, 2005, the son of Kim and Steve Frazier, and grew up in Austin, Texas. His father played college football for the Michigan Wolverines as a center, winning the 1997 national championship. He attended Vandegrift High School in Austin, where he played football and first started out as a backup tight end for the junior varsity team. Frazier was 195 pounds (88 kg) as a sophomore, but grew to be 6 feet 5 inches (1.96 m) with a weight of 270 pounds (120 kg) and converted to offensive tackle by his senior year. In his final season, he was unanimously named district offensive lineman of the year and was chosen to the Whataburger Super Team ballot by Dave Campbell's Texas Football. As a four-star recruit, he committed to play college football for the Michigan Wolverines.

== College career ==
Frazier enrolled at the University of Michigan in 2024, and did not see any playing time as a freshman. In 2025, he won a starting role as a sophomore, appearing in 13 games and eight as a starter.
