= Voxtrot =

American band

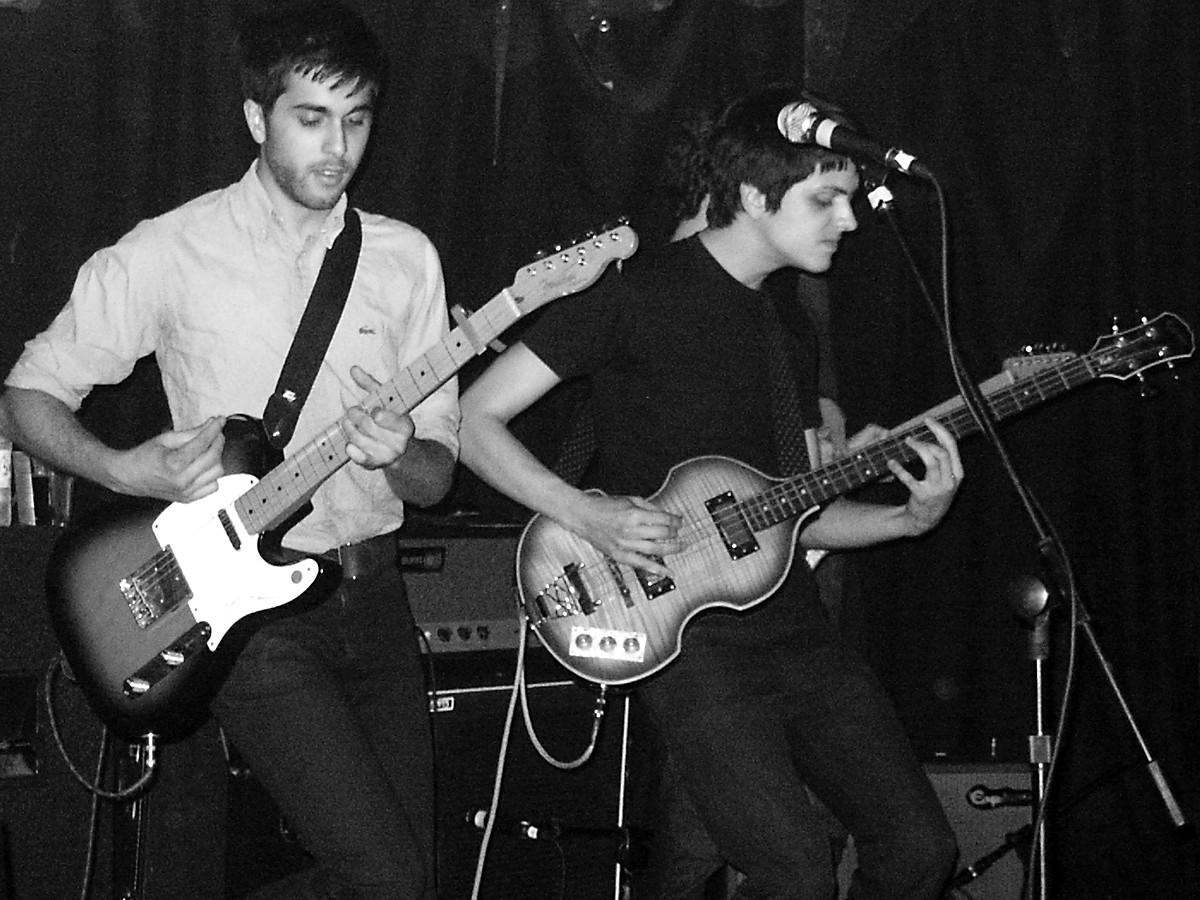
- Ramesh Srivastava and Jason Chronis performing with Voxtrot in Chicago, 2006

Background information
- Origin: Austin, Texas, U.S.
- Genres: Indie pop; indie rock
- Years active: 2003–2010; 2022–present
- Labels: Cult Hero Records; Beggars Group
- Members: Ramesh Srivastava; Jason Chronis; Matt Simon; Mitch Calvert; Jared Van Fleet
- Website: www.voxtrot.net

Voxtrot is an American indie pop band formed in Austin, Texas, in 2003. Their first recordings were released in 2003, and their debut EP, Raised by Wolves, was released in 2005 to critical acclaim, garnering attention from music bloggers as well as major publications such as Pitchfork and Spin. The band gained popularity online during the rise of the early online music blogosphere, particularly among MP3 blogs, leading them to be regarded as a defining act of the blog rock era.

The band released two additional EPs in 2006, Mothers, Sisters, Daughters & Wives, and Your Biggest Fan, before releasing their debut self-titled album in 2007. After releasing their first album, the group continued to perform live and released several singles before announcing their impending disbandment in April 2010. The band performed a short tour of the United States leading up to their dissolution, ending in New York City on June 26, 2010.

On May 6, 2022, the group announced they were embarking on a reunion tour through the latter part of the year. Following their 2022 reunion, the band resumed recording and released Dreamers in Exile (2026), their first studio album in nearly two decades.

== History ==
=== Early work; Voxtrot ===
Voxtrot was formed in Austin, Texas by singer-songwriter and Texas native Ramesh Srivastava in the early 2000s. Srivastava had previously studied at the University of Glasgow before dropping out of the Berklee College of Music and returning to Texas. Early incarnations of the group included Jennifer Moore and Brandon Eastes, but by 2005 when the band's self-released debut, a five-song EP entitled Raised by Wolves, was released the lineup had been solidified to include Srivastava, Jason Chronis, Matt Simon, Mitch Calvert, and Jared van Fleet.

After the release of Raised by Wolves in July 2005, the band began touring nationally and received accolades from various online and print publications such as Spin and Pitchfork. Spin noted that Raised by Wolves was "...a stunning mini-collection of John Hughes-heyday paeans, twitchy pop, and surging, Strokes-y dancefloor fillers." A second five-song EP, Mothers, Sisters, Daughters & Wives, arrived in stores on April 4, 2006. The three-song EP Your Biggest Fan followed on November 17 of the same year.

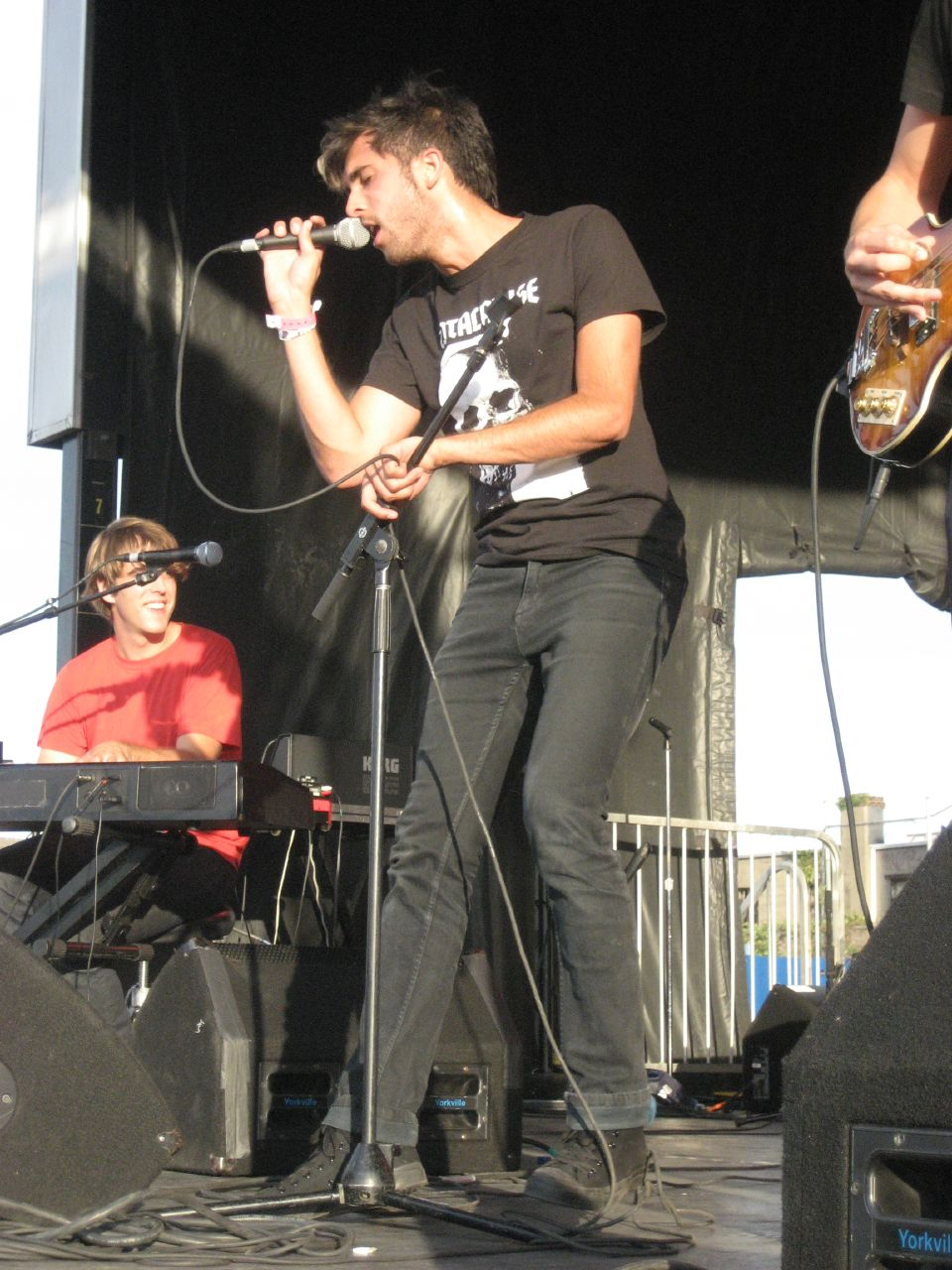
Voxtrot performing at Coney Island, New York, 2007

On October 26, 2006, the Los Angeles Times reported that the group was entering the studio to record their debut album. Initially, the group had sought Stephen Street, who had previously worked with The Smiths and Blur, to produce the album, but Street was unable to due to scheduling conflicts. The band's first full-length self-titled debut album was released on May 22, 2007, by Beggars Group. The album peaked at number 42 on the Billboard Independent Albums chart. Eric Harvey of Pitchfork awarded the album a 5.9 out of 10 rating, writing: "Voxtrot shows a young band eagerly trying to have it all: attempting to establish a mature musical identity while aiming for a wide audience. Voxtrot may very well have a great pop record within them, yet their first effort stumbles from the band's enthusiastic, ambitious attempt to produce it immediately." The album's first single, "Blood Red Blood", was released as a 7" limited to 1,000 copies June 4, 2007, by Playlouder Recordings. To promote the album, the band toured with Au Revoir Simone and Favourite Sons in the summer of 2007.

=== Later singles and dissolution ===
In March 2009, Voxtrot released the single "Trepanation Party", which received significant airplay on the Sirius/XM's influential Sirius XMU channel. The track was recorded and mixed with Jim Eno of the band Spoon. The sound of "Trepanation Party" is a significant departure from their indie sound, towards a more synth-pop feel.

Voxtrot released a limited edition 7" single "Berlin, Without Return..." on August 3, 2009. The single contained the song "The Dream Lives of Ordinary People" as a B-side and was initially released in a limited pressing of 400 copies. The single was self-released by the band's own Cult Hero Records.

On April 21, 2010, lead singer Srivastava announced on the band's website that they would be breaking up following a short tour, entitled the 'Goodbye, Cruel World..." tour, which consisted of a total of seven dates. In the letter addressed to fans, Srivastava noted that "The career path of Voxtrot was truly one of long, simmering build, explosion, and almost instantaneous decay. Slowly, I am learning to replace any feelings of regret with positive memories of how amazing the whole thing was, and how it has, in an unexpected way, fortified my character." The band performed their last show on June 26, 2010—incidentally Srivastava's 27th birthday—at the Bowery Ballroom in New York City.

Lead singer Srivastava released his first solo album, The King, in 2014 after releasing several tracks and an EP.

=== 2022–present: Reunion and Dreamers in Exile ===
On May 6, 2022, Voxtrot announced a reunion tour and two archival releases. The first, Early Music, collected the band's EPs Raised by Wolves and Mothers, Sisters, Daughters & Wives, while Cut from the Stone: Rarities & B-Sides compiled other archival material. The tour began in September 2022 and included dates in New York, Washington, D.C., San Francisco, Los Angeles, Chicago, Minneapolis, and Austin.

In September 2023, Voxtrot released "Another Fire", their first new song in fourteen years. The recording featured the band's five original members: Ramesh Srivastava, Jason Chronis, Matt Simon, Mitch Calvert, and Jared Van Fleet. Three singles followed: "New World Romance" (November 10, 2023) , "My Peace" (February 16, 2024) and "Esprit de Cœur" (July 11, 2024).

On December 3, 2025, Voxtrot announced Dreamers in Exile, their first studio album since Voxtrot in 2007, along with the single "Fighting Back" and a 2026 tour. According to Pitchfork, the band decided to make the album on the final night of its 2023 reunion tour and self-recorded it at bassist Jason Chronis' Haunted Air Studio in Lockhart, Texas. Stereogum reported that the album was mixed by Dean Reid.

Dreamers in Exile was released on February 27, 2026, by Cult Hero Records. Reviewing the album for Pitchfork, Brian Howe described it as "a cathartic, mature comeback record" and noted that it combined elements of the band's earlier indie-pop sound with classic rock, contemporary pop, and country influences.

== Discography ==
=== Albums ===
- Voxtrot (2007) Playlouderecordings / The Beggars Group
- Early Music (2022), a remastered release of the band's first two EPs Cult Hero Records
- Cut from the Stone: Rarities & B-Sides (2022) Cult Hero Records
- Dreamers in Exile (2026) Cult Hero Records

=== EPs ===
- Raised by Wolves (2005, Cult Hero Records)
- Mothers, Sisters, Daughters & Wives (2006, Cult Hero Records)
- Your Biggest Fan (2006, Beggars Group/Playlouderecordings)

=== US singles ===
- The Start of Something 7" b/w "Dirty Version" (2004) Cult Hero Records / The Bus Stop Label
- Raised by Wolves 7" b/w "They Never Mean What They Say" (2005) Magic Marker Records
- Trepanation Party digital single (2009) Cult Hero Records
- Berlin, Without Return... 7" b/w "The Dream Lives Of Ordinary People" (2009) Cult Hero Records

=== UK/Europe singles ===
- Mothers, Sisters, Daughters & Wives 7" b/w "Rise Up in the Dirt" (2006) Full Time Hobby Records
- Mothers, Sisters, Daughters & Wives EP & 2x7" (2006) Re-Issue / Beggars Group/Playlouderecordings
- Trouble 7" (limited to 1000 copies) and digital single, from the Your Biggest Fan EP (2007) Beggars Group/Playlouderecordings
- Blood Red Blood 7" (limited to 1000 copies) and digital single, from Voxtrot (2007) Beggars Group/Playlouderecordings
- Firecracker 7" (limited to 1000 copies), CD and digital single, from Voxtrot (2007) No. 19 UK Indie Beggars Group/Playlouderecordings

=== Compilations ===
- "The Start of Something" featured on Bang Crash Boom, Little Teddy Recordings, 2005 (Germany)
- "Warmest Part of the Winter" featured on Little Darla Has a Treat for You, vol. 24 · Darla Records, 2006 (US)
- "The Start of Something" featured on The Kids at the Club, How Does It Feel To Be Loved, 2006 (UK)
- "The Start of Something" featured on the feature film The Ex 2007 (US)
- "Whiskey & Water" featured on P.E.A.C.E., Buffet Libre/Amnesty International, 2010 (Spain)

=== Digital singles ===
- Another Fire (2023) Cult Hero Records
- New World Romance (2023) Cult Hero Records
- My Peace (2024) Cult Hero Records
- They Never Mean What They Say - originally released as Raised By Wolves 7" b-side (2024) Cult Hero Records
- Esprit de Cœur (2024) Cult Hero Records

=== Videos ===
- Esprit de Cœur (2024) on YouTube.com
- Another Fire (2023) on YouTube.com
- The Start of Something (2022) on YouTube.com
- Firecracker (2007) on YouTube.com
- Steven (2007) on YouTube.com

== Chart positions ==
Chart	Work	Peak position	Ref.
Billboard Independent Albums	Voxtrot (2007)	42	
Billboard Heatseekers	Voxtrot (2007)	14	
Hot Singles Sales	Your Biggest Fan (2006)	4	

== Members ==
- Ramesh Srivastava – vocals, rhythm guitar (2003–Present)
- Mitch Calvert – lead guitar (2003–Present)
- Jason Chronis – bass (2003–Present)
- Jared van Fleet – keyboards, guitar, strings (2003–Present)
- Matt Simon – drums (2003–Present)
