= Mothers, Sisters, Daughters & Wives =

EP by Voxtrot
- Released: April 4, 2006
- Genres: Indie pop, indie rock
- Length: 17:35
- Label: Cult Hero Records

Voxtrot chronology
Raised by Wolves (2005)	Mothers, Sisters, Daughters & Wives (2006)	Your Biggest Fan (2006)

Professional ratings
Review scores
Source	Rating
AllMusic	link
Pitchfork	(8.2/10) link
Subculture Magazine	(positive) link

Mothers, Sisters, Daughters & Wives is an EP by Voxtrot, released on April 4, 2006, in the United States and September 25, 2006 worldwide.

In 2022, it was remastered and combined with the band's Raised by Wolves EP as a reissue compilation called Early Music.

== Critical response ==
Brian Howe of Pitchfork awarded the album an 8.2 out of 10 rating, while Jeff Terich of Treble noted, "While Wolves came close to being perfect, Mothers, Sisters, Daughters and Wives actually is perfect."

== Track listings ==
- CD released by Cult Hero Records on April 4, 2006, (US only) and Beggars Group / Playlouder on September 25, 2006, (worldwide except US.)
1. "Mothers, Sisters, Daughters & Wives"
2. "Fast Asleep"
3. "Rise Up in the Dirt"
4. "Four Long Days"
5. "Soft & Warm"
- 7" released by Full Time Hobby Recordings (FTH021S) on June 12, 2006, (UK only).
1. "Mothers, Sisters, Daughters & Wives"
2. "Rise Up in the Dirt"
