= Rouse High School =

Location
- 1222 Raider Way; Leander, Texas 78641; United States; 30.57183°N 97.82007°W

Information
- School type: Public high school
- Motto: "Creating Traditions that others can live up to"
- Established: 2008
- School district: Leander Independent School District
- Principal: Vincent Hawkins
- Teaching staff: 111.08 (FTE)
- Grades: 9 to 12
- Enrollment: 2,460 (2025-2026)
- Student to teacher ratio: 15.20
- Colors: Maroon, gold, and black
- Athletics conference: UIL Class 6A (2026-), Class 5A (2016-2026)
- Mascot: Raider
- Newspaper: Raider Rumbler
- Yearbook: Rouse Replay
- Website: Rouse High School

Rouse High School was established in 2008 by the Leander Independent School District in Leander, Texas to relieve overcrowding in the quickly growing district. It is named after Charles Rouse, a former principal at Leander High School. When the school first opened in 2008, it had only a freshman class. However, in its fourth year, the school was opened to seniors, juniors, sophomores, and freshmen, which eventually led to them growing to a 6A classification under the UIL format. In 2011, the school was rated "Academically Acceptable" by the Texas Education Agency.

== Demographics ==
The demographic breakdown of the 2,260 students enrolled for the 2026-2027 school year was:

- Male - 52%
- Female - 48%
- White - 45.7%
- Hispanic - 19.2%
- Asian - 25.6%
- Two or More Races - 5.6%
- Black - 3.6%
- American Indian/Alaska Native - 0.2%
- Native Hawaiian/Pacific Islander - 0%

== Administration ==
As of 2026-2027 School year:

- Vincent Hawkins, Principal
- Brenna Smith, Dean of Instruction
- Byron Harkless - Associate Principal
- Anne Ballou-Bates - Asst. Principal
- Savannah Robinson - Asst. Principal
- Rosie Palazzolo - Asst. Principal
- Samuel Rodriguez, Asst. Principal

== School Hours ==
As of 2026-2027 school year:

8:15am - 3:35pm (7:45am doors open for students)
