= Vista Ridge High School (Texas) =

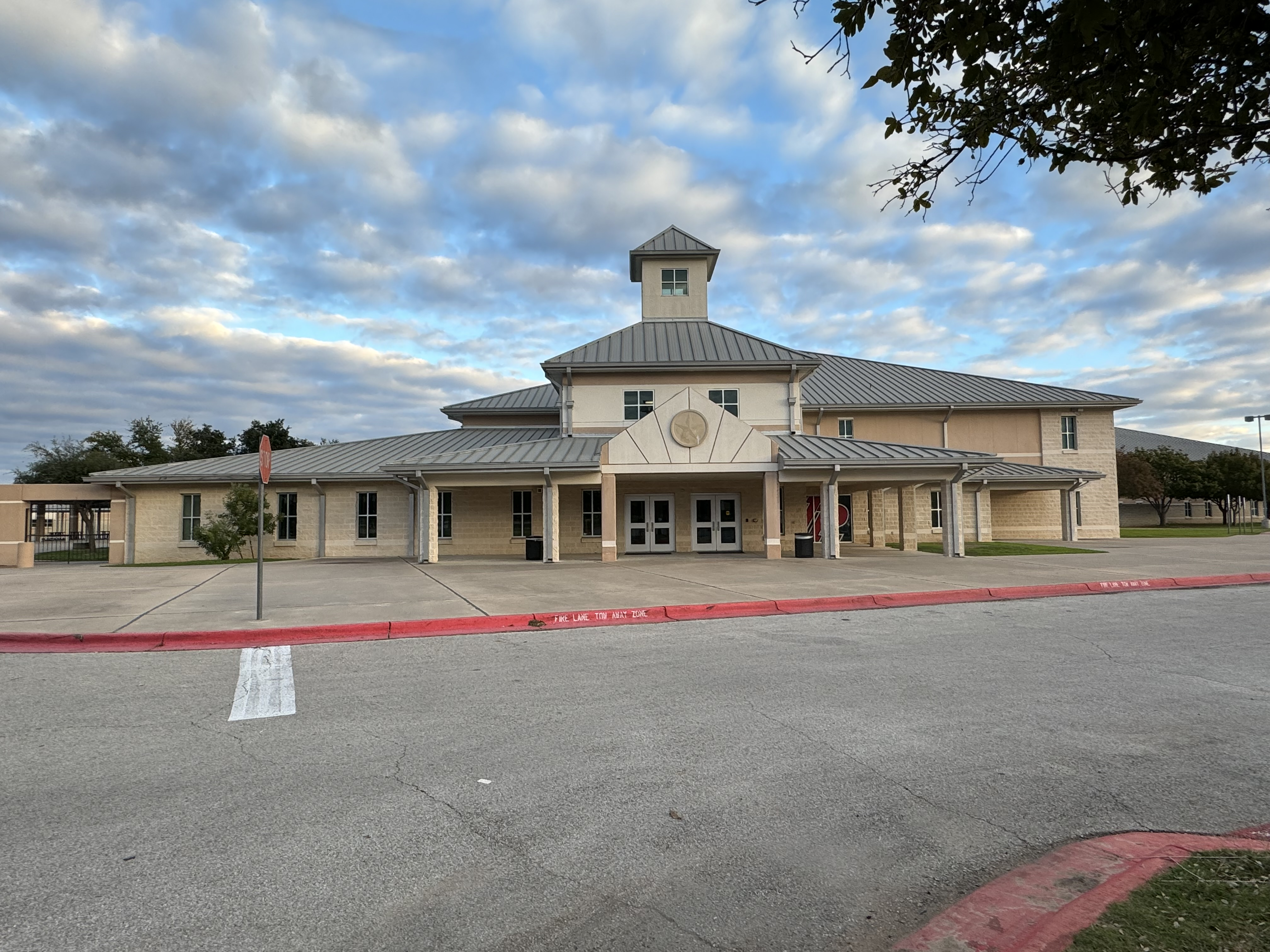

Location
- 200 South Vista Ridge Blvd. Cedar Park, TX 78613; Williamson County, Texas; United States; 30.51652°N 97.78698°W

Information
- Type: Public school
- Motto: "Preparing our students to be the best for the world."
- Established: 2003
- School district: Leander Independent School District
- Principal: Keith Morgan
- Teaching staff: 169.67 (FTE)
- Grades: 9–12
- Enrollment: 2,496 (2025–2026)
- Student to teacher ratio: 15.42
- Campus: Suburban
- Colors: Red, Black & Silver
- Athletics conference: UIL Class 6A (2016–), Class 5A (2014–2016), Class 4A (2010–2014), Class 5A (2008–2010), Class 4A (2006–2008), TAPPS (2003–2006)
- Nickname: Rangers
- Website: vrhs.leanderisd.org

Vista Ridge High School (VRHS) is a high school in Cedar Park, Texas. Founded in 2003, it serves as the third high school in the Leander Independent School District (LISD). The school graduated its inaugural class, known as the "Alpha" class, in 2007. Vista Ridge was built to accommodate the rapid growth of the area and has continued to expand with additions such as its auditorium and John Gupton Stadium. Vista Ridge is part of the 6A UIL conference as of the 2025–2026 school year.

== Demographics ==
The demographic breakdown of the 2,617 students enrolled for the 2025–2026 school year was:

- White – 42.2%
- Hispanic – 26.4%
- Asian – 21.2%
- Two or More Races – 5.5%
- Black – 3.6%
- American Indian/Alaska Native – 0.3%
- Native Hawaiian/Pacific Islander – 0.1%

== Campus ==
Vista Ridge High School is located in southern Cedar Park on a suburban campus that supports a wide range of academic and extracurricular programs. The school includes academic wings, science laboratories, computer labs, a library, and fine arts facilities including a dedicated auditorium.

An auditorium addition was completed in 2013 to expand the school’s performing arts capacity. The campus is adjacent to John Gupton Stadium, which opened in 2010 and is used for football, soccer, and marching band events.

Beginning in 2025, Vista Ridge High School underwent a multi‑phase modernization project funded by a district bond. Renovations included new HVAC systems, updated lighting, flooring replacement, restroom upgrades, library improvements, and modernization of CTE and ROTC spaces. Construction progressed through 2025–2026, with several phases completed ahead of the 2026 school year.

== History ==
Since its founding in 2003, the campus has expanded to accommodate the rapid growth of Cedar Park, including the construction of an auditorium addition in 2013 and the John Gupton Stadium, which opened in 2010.

== Feeder Schools ==
The following middle schools feed into VRHS according to official district attendance zones:

- Artie Henry Middle School (majority)
- Florence Stiles Middle School (minority)
- Cedar Park Middle School (minority)
- Running Brushy Middle School (minority)
- Bernice Knox Wiley Middle School (minority)

== Academics ==
=== Science ===
Vista Ridge High School has maintained a dominant presence in the Greater Austin Regional Science and Engineering Fair (GARSEF), which serves as the regional qualifier for the International Science and Engineering Fair. The school secured its 12th Sweepstakes award in 2020, outperforming 38 other high schools in the senior division. Success has continued into the 2020s, with Vista Ridge winning the Sweepstakes Award again in 2021 and 2022. Multiple students also regularly qualify for the Texas Science and Engineering Fair and international competition, including multiple "Best of Fair" honors in 2023.

== Extra-curricular ==
=== Navy Junior Reserve Officer Training Corps ===
The school's NJROTC program, known as the Lone Star Company, has held the Distinguished Unit with Academic Honors designation since 2012. It consistently ranks as a top program within Navy Area 10, earning the #1 ranking in Texas in 2023. The unit maintains competitive teams in air rifle marksmanship, armed and unarmed drill, color guard, orienteering, and physical training (PT), and it frequently competes in the national CyberPatriot cybersecurity competition.

=== Ranger Marching Band ===
The Ranger Marching Band was invited to perform in the 2023 Rose Parade in Pasadena, California, where they were the sole representative from the state of Texas. The band has earned numerous honors in University Interscholastic League (UIL) and Bands of America (BOA) competitions::

- UIL 6A Texas State Marching Band Champions: 2018
- UIL 6A Area H Champions: 2018, 2021, 2022, 2025
- Bands of America Midland Regional Champions: 2019
- Bands of America Austin Regional Awards: Best Visual Performance (2018), Best Music Performance (Class AAA, 2016)

=== Robotics ===
Vista Ridge High School maintains a competitive robotics program consisting of four FIRST Tech Challenge (FTC) teams: Static Void (6990), Victorian Voltage (7797), Rogue Resistance (9527), and Chaotic Current (21438). The program utilizes a specialized team structure where students are divided into hardware, software, and marketing departments led by student Project Managers (PM).

The teams represent the school in the FTC DECODE league and have a history of high-level competition success. Rogue Resistance won the UIL 6A State Championship in 2023, and Victorian Voltage earned a state championship in 2019. In 2026, Chaotic Current placed second overall in the UIL 6A division at the Texas State Cup.

== Notable alumni ==
- Tyler Patmon (2009), NFL cornerback
- Will Licon (2013), swimmer, 11-time NCAA Champion, American record-holder
- Khiry Shelton (2011), soccer player
- Japreece Dean (2015), basketball player drafted by the Chicago Sky of the WNBA
- Taylor McHargue (2009), former Rice University quarterback and current college football analyst for CBS Sports
- Bella Kay (2024), singer-songwriter
