= Voxtrot (album) =

Studio album by Voxtrot
- Released: May 22, 2007
- Recorded: December 2006 – March 2007
- Genres: Indie pop, indie rock
- Length: 43:50
- Label: Playlouderecordings / Beggars Group
- Producer: Victor Van Vugt

Voxtrot chronology
Your Biggest Fan (2006)	Voxtrot (2007)

Professional ratings
Aggregate scores
Source	Rating
Metacritic	71/100
Review scores
Source	Rating
AllMusic	3.5/5 stars
Alternative Press	3.5/5 stars
The Austin Chronicle	3.5/5 stars
The A.V. Club	B
NME	8/10
Obscure Sound	4/5 stars
Pitchfork	5.9/10
PopMatters	4/5 stars
Rolling Stone	3/5 stars

Voxtrot is the first full-length album by the Texas-based indie pop band Voxtrot. It was released worldwide on May 22, 2007. Ramesh Srivastava, lead singer of the band, announced in December 2006 that the band was starting work on its long-awaited full-length record.

The album was leaked in its entirety to the Internet on March 16, 2007.

"Kid Gloves" can be heard on the band's MySpace and an MP3 of the track was made available as a free download through Pitchfork's Forkcast on March 19, 2007. The MP3 has since been added to Voxtrot's website.

== Track listing ==
All songs written by Ramesh Srivastava.

1. "Introduction" - 3:32
2. "Kid Gloves" - 4:23
3. "Ghost" - 4:48
4. "Steven" - 3:27
5. "Firecracker" - 3:43
6. "Brother in Conflict" - 4:04
7. "Easy" - 3:35
8. "The Future Pt. 1" - 3:41
9. "Every Day" - 4:25
10. "Real Life Version" - 4:00
11. "Blood Red Blood" - 4:13
12. "Loan Shark" - 4:08 (iTunes only)
13. "New Love" - 4:06 (iTunes only)
