= Cedar Park, Texas =

Cedar Park
- City
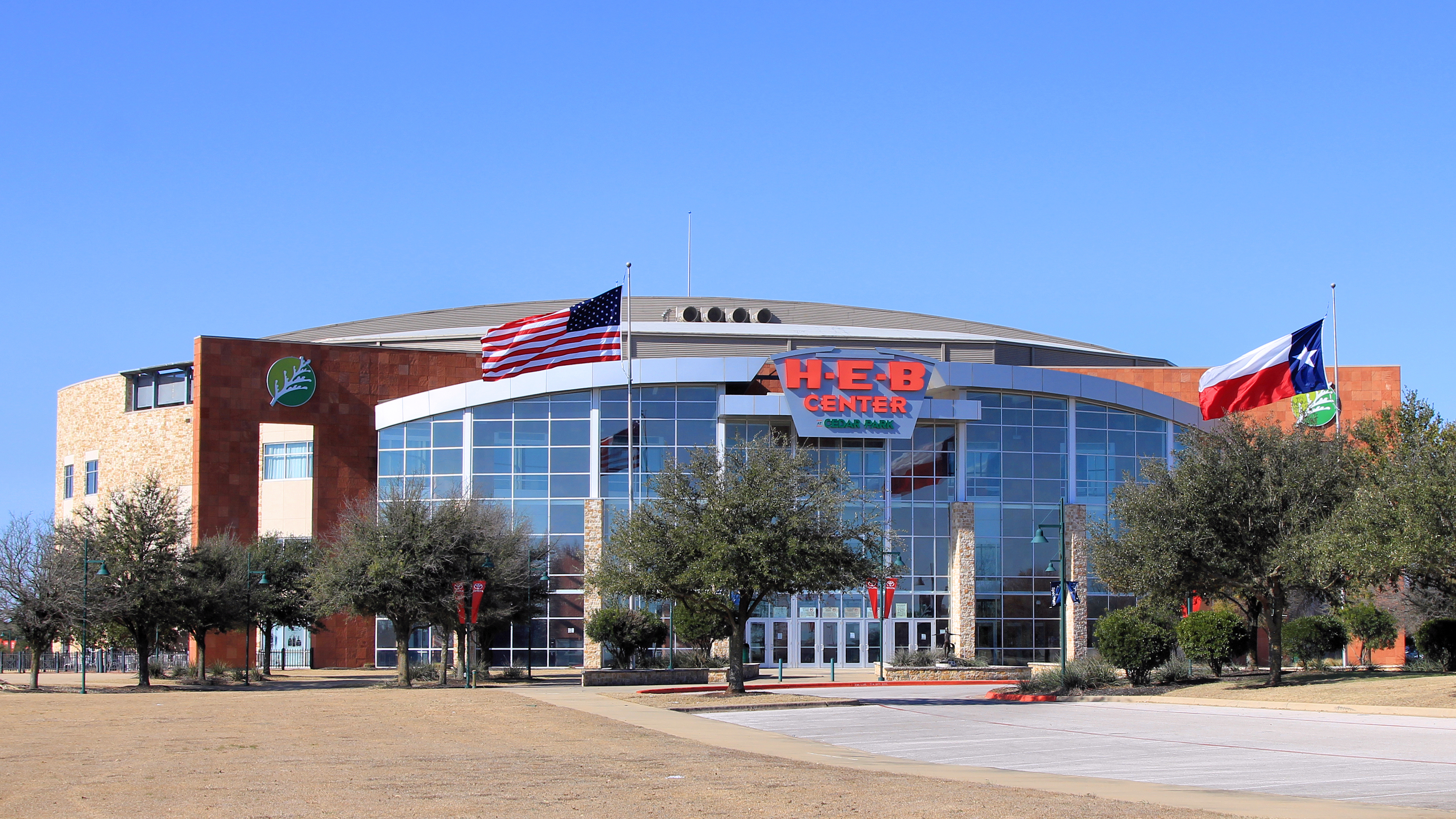
- H-E-B Center at Cedar Park

- Logo

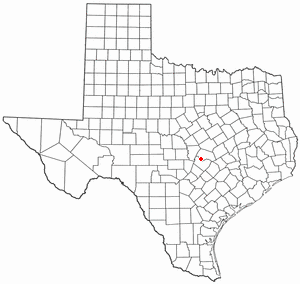
- Location of Cedar Park, Texas

- Coordinates: 30°30′24″N 97°49′49″W
- Country: United States
- State: Texas
- Counties: Williamson, Travis
- Established: 1887
- Incorporated: February 24, 1973

Government
  - Type: Council-Manager
  - City Council: Mayor Jim Penniman-Morin; Alexis Frezza; Mel Kirkland; Anne Duffy; Eric Boyce; Kevin Harris; Petri Darby
  - City Manager: Brenda Eivens

Area
  - Total: 25.70 sq mi (66.56 km^{2})
  - Land: 25.50 sq mi (66.05 km^{2})
  - Water: 0.20 sq mi (0.51 km^{2})
- Elevation: 935 ft (285 m)

Population (2020)
  - Total: 77,595
  - Density: 3,115.7/sq mi (1,202.97/km^{2})
- Time zone: UTC-6 (Central (CST))
  - Summer (DST): UTC-5 (CDT)
- ZIP codes: 78613, 78630
- Area code(s): 512 & 737
- FIPS code: 48-13552
- GNIS feature ID: 2409418
- Website: Cedar Park, Texas

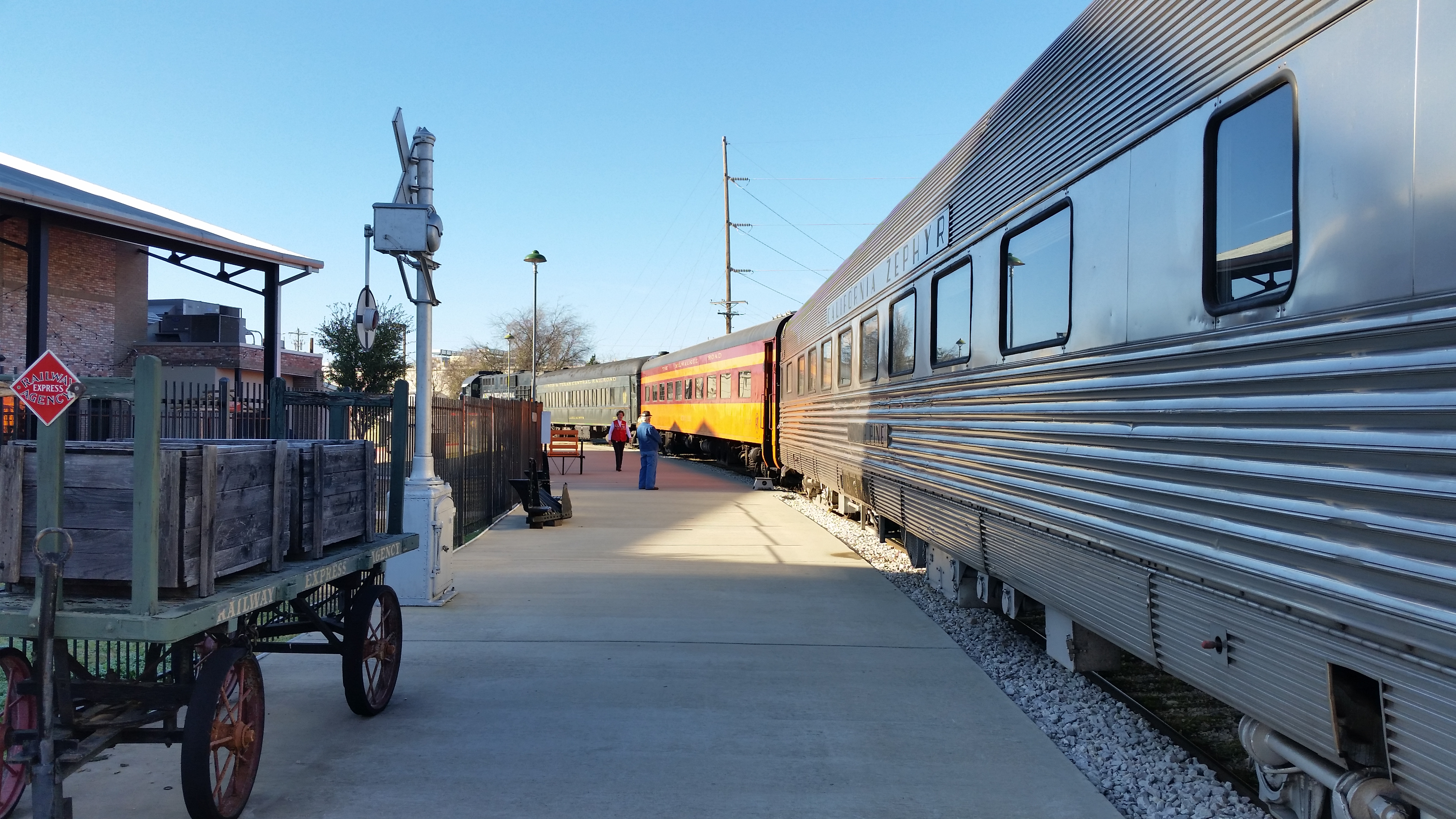
Cedar Park Depot, Texas

Cedar Park is a city in Williamson County in the U.S. state of Texas, with a small portion extending into Travis County. It is a suburb of Austin, located about 16 miles (26 km) northwest of downtown Austin. According to the 2020 U.S. census, the city's population was 77,595, and in 2025 was estimated to be 79,032.

== History ==
Before the arrival of European settlers in the 19th century, the Cedar Park area was inhabited by Native American tribes including the Tonkawa, Lipan Apache, and Comanche. A Paleo-Indian archaeological site (Wilson-Leonard site) was discovered in Cedar Park in 1973 that showed evidence of continual habitation of the area since c. 5,000 BC.

In the mid-19th century, the community was known as Running Brushy, named after a spring that formed the headwaters of a creek of the same name. In 1873, George and Harriet Cluck, after having run cattle up the Chisholm Trail for many years, bought 329 acres (1.33 km^{2}) of land that included the Running Brushy spring. Their ranch formed the core of the community that became Cedar Park.

Ten years later, the railroad came through. The Austin and Northwestern Railroad, which connected the state capital with the cities of Burnet and Lampasas to the north, was finished in 1882 and passed through Running Brushy and the Cluck ranch. The community was renamed Bruggerhoff, after a railroad company official, but the name was generally disliked by locals, being hard to spell and pronounce. In 1887, Emmett Cluck (son of George and Harriet) changed the community's name to Cedar Park. In 1892, a "strolling park" of 0.5 acres (2,000 m^{2}) was built near the train depot. Austinites would ride the train to Cedar Park for day trips to the park.

Cedar Park changed little until the 1950s and 1960s, when the growth of nearby Austin spilled over. On February 24, 1973, the citizens of Cedar Park voted to incorporate. The estimated population was 1,765. A library followed in 1978.

On May 27, 1997, a strong and destructive F3 tornado struck the town. The tornado was one of 20 confirmed tornadoes that occurred during the 1997 Central Texas Tornado outbreak. It devastated the downtown area of the city, killing one person and nearly destroying the Albertson's grocery store.

In December 2007, Cedar Park Regional Medical Center opened becoming the first major medical center in Cedar Park.

In 2013, the US Census Bureau named Cedar Park the fourth-fastest growing city in the United States, with a population of 57,957.

On April 4, 2016, the city announced it was collecting submissions for designs for an official city flag. Residents had until April 30 to submit proposed designs. On December 9, 2016, Cedar Park unveiled the flag design that won. On August 8, 2019, the City Council voted to rescind that particular design after "pushback on social media" from residents. As of September 2021, the city has no formal flag.

== Demographics ==
Historical population
Census	Pop.	Note	%±
1930	117		—
1940	129		10.3%
1950	302		134.1%
1960	685		126.8%
1970	1,012		47.7%
1980	3,474		243.3%
1990	5,261		51.4%
2000	26,049		395.1%
2010	48,937		87.9%
2020	77,595		58.6%
2025 (est.)	79,032		1.9%
U.S. Decennial Census

=== 2020 census ===
As of the 2020 census, Cedar Park had a population of 77,595, 27,902 households, 18,589 families, and a median age of 36.8 years.

About 27.7% of residents were under 18 and 10.6% were 65 or older. For every 100 females, there were 95.5 males, and for every 100 females 18 and over, there were 93.0 males 18 and over.

Almost all of the residents lived in urban areas, while <0.1% lived in rural areas.

Of these households, 42.6% had children under 18 living in them, 56.9% were married-couple households, 15.5% were households with a male householder and no spouse or partner present, and 22.1% were households with a female householder and no spouse or partner present. About 22.1% of all households were made up of individuals, and 7.0% had someone living alone who was 65 or older.

The city had 29,192 housing units, of which 4.4% were vacant. Among occupied housing units, 63.2% were owner-occupied and 36.8% were renter-occupied. The homeowner vacancy rate was 0.6% and the rental vacancy rate was 8.1%.

Cedar Park racial composition as of 2020 (NH = Non-Hispanic) (Note: Note: the US census treats Hispanic/Latino as an ethnic category. This table excludes Latinos from the racial categories and assigns them to a separate category. Hispanics/Latinos can be of any race.)
Race	Number	Percentage
White (NH)	44,665	57.56%
Black or African American (NH)	3,238	4.17%
Native American or Alaska Native (NH)	179	0.23%
Asian (NH)	10,919	14.07%
Pacific Islander (NH)	61	0.08%
Some Other Race (NH)	380	0.49%
Multiracial (NH)	3,763	4.85%
Hispanic or Latino	14,390	18.55%
Total	77,595	

Racial composition as of the 2020 census
Race	Percent
White	62.1%
Black or African American	4.4%
American Indian and Alaska Native	0.6%
Asian	14.2%
Native Hawaiian and other Pacific Islander	0.1%
Some other race	5.1%
Two or more races	13.5%
Hispanic or Latino (of any race)	18.5%

=== 2010 census ===
According to the U.S. census, in 2010, 48,937 people living in the city in 17,817 households and 12,926 families. The population density was 2,141.9 inhabitants per square mile (827.0/km^{2}). The 8,914 housing units had an average density of 525.3 per square mile (202.8/km^{2}).

The racial makeup of the city was 81.4% White, 4.3% African American, 0.5% Native American, 5.1% Asian, 0.1% Native Hawaiian or Pacific Islander, 5.10% from other races, and 3.4% from two or more races. About 19% of the population was Hispanic or Latino of any race.

The 17,817 total households included 12,926 families; 45.7% had children under 18 living with them, and 13.5% had an individual 65 years or older living with them. About 21.4% of all households were made up of individuals. The average household size was 2.74, and the average family size was 3.22.

The age distribution included 32.8% who were 19 and under, 38.8% from 20 to 44, 21.8% from 45 to 64, and 6.7% who were 65 or older. The median age was 33.4 years.

The median income for a household in the city was $87,466.

== Geography ==
Cedar Park lies mostly in Williamson County, although a small amount extends into Travis County.

According to the United States Census Bureau, the city has a total area of 25.6 sq mi (66 km^{2}), of which 0.3 sq mi (0.78 km^{2}) (0.88%) is covered by water.

Cedar Park is generally bisected north to south by U.S. Route 183. A bypass route, 183A Toll Road, also runs through Cedar Park; it opened to traffic on March 15, 2007. Major east–west routes include RM-1431/Whitestone Boulevard and Cypress Creek/Brushy Creek Road.

== Government ==
Cedar Park was incorporated in 1973 with a council–manager form of local government.

The seven members serve two-year terms. The mayor and council members place two, place four and place six are elected in even years. The remaining members are elected in odd years.

Cedar Park is represented in Texas House of Representatives by Democrat John Bucy III. In the Texas State Senate, Cedar Park is represented by Republican Charles Schwertner. In the United States House of Representatives, Cedar Park is represented by Republican John Carter.

== Sports ==
Cedar Park is home to the Texas Stars of the American Hockey League and the Austin Spurs of the NBA G League. Both the Texas Stars and Austin Spurs play their home games at the H-E-B Center at Cedar Park.

A public skate park facility opened in Cedar Park in July 2010. The 15,000-square-foot (1,400 m^{2}) facility features a large bowl, mini bowl, and modern street course.

== Institutions and schools ==
Cedar Park is served primarily by the Leander Independent School District and is home to the Cedar Park High School Timberwolves and the Vista Ridge High School Rangers. Cedar Park won its first football state championship on December 21, 2012. The Timberwolves defeated Lancaster 17–7 at Cowboys Stadium in Arlington, winning the Class 4A, Division II state title. In 2015, the Timberwolves won both state titles in band and football with the latter beating Frisco Lone Star for the Class 5A, Division II state championship. Cedar Park High school is the only Texas high school to win UIL state titles in both band and football in the same year.

Neighborhoods in the southern and easternmost areas of the city are wholly or partially served by the Round Rock Independent School District. Some elementary schools that serve these neighborhoods are Old Town, or Patsy Sommer. Walsh Middle School and Round Rock High School also serve these areas.

The city is home to the Cypress Creek campus of Austin Community College, which was significantly expanded in 2008 to accommodate the area's growing population.

The Texas Psychological Association is located in the city.

== H-E-B Center at Cedar Park ==
The H-E-B Center at Cedar Park (formerly known as Cedar Park Center) is a multipurpose indoor arena that was completed in 2009 and hosts a wide array of live entertainment events. George Strait opened the center as its first event on September 25, 2009. The H-E-B Center is also home of the Texas Stars, the AHL affiliate of the Dallas Stars, and the Austin Spurs, the G-league affiliate of the San Antonio Spurs. The center is located at the corner of New Hope Drive and 183A Toll Road.

== See also ==
- Austin Western Railroad
