= Vandegrift High School =

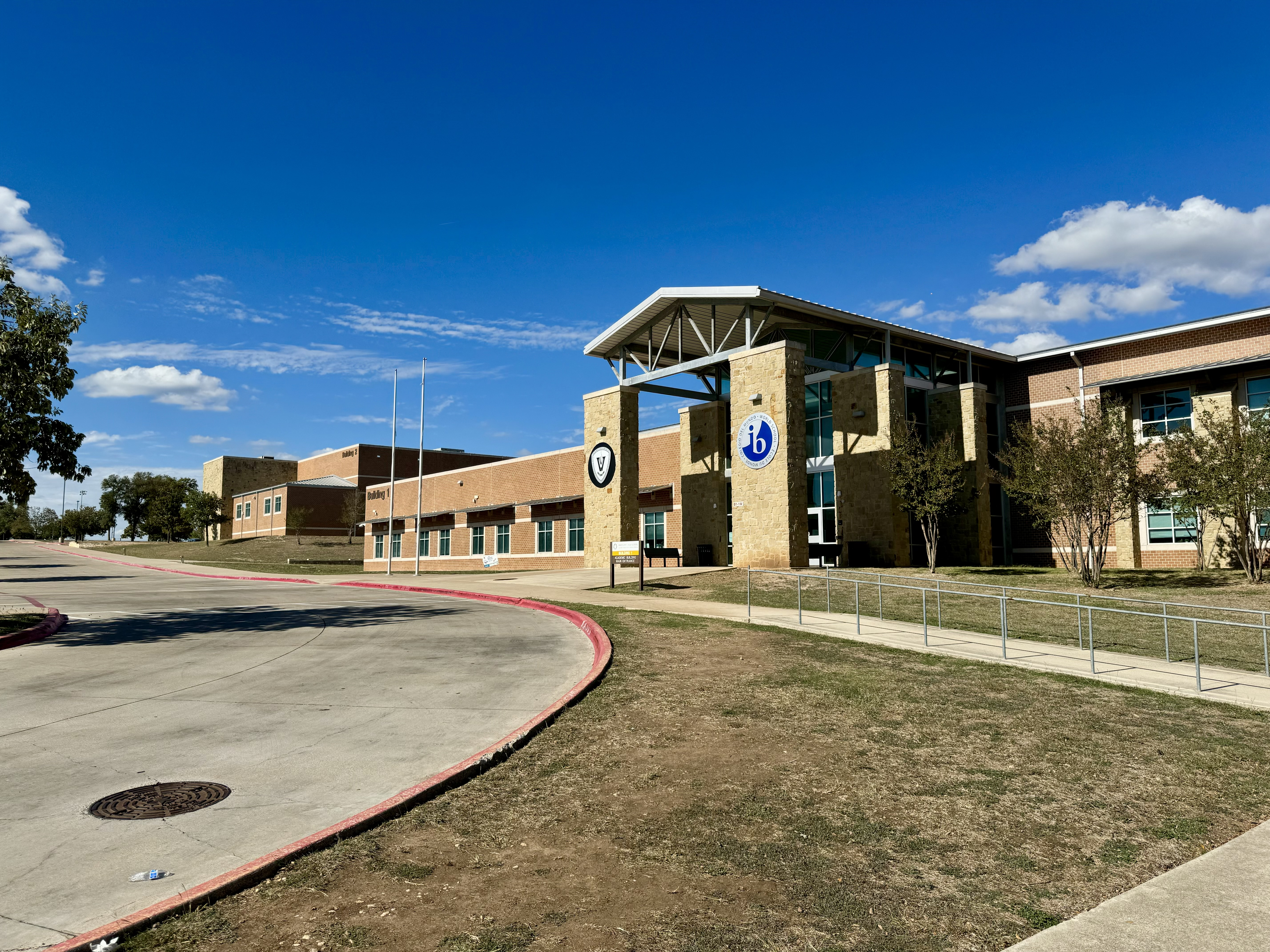

Location
- 9500 McNeil Drive; Austin, Texas 78750; United States; 30°23′48″N 97°49′26″W

Information
- Type: Public school
- Motto: Second to None
- Established: 2009
- School district: Leander Independent School District
- Superintendent: Bruce Gearing Ed.D.
- CEEB code: 440363
- Principal: Charlie Little
- Teaching staff: 155.26 (on a FTE basis)
- Grades: 9-12
- Enrollment: 2,360 (2025-2026)
- Student to teacher ratio: 16.58
- Classes offered: Advanced Placement (AP), International Baccalaureate (IB), and Dual Enrollment (Austin Community College and UT OnRamps).
- Campus: Suburban
- Colors: Black and silver
- Song: We’ll Never Walk Alone
- Athletics conference: UIL Class 6A (2016-), Class 5A (2014–2016), Class 4A (2010–2014), Class 3A (2009–2010)
- Nickname: Vipers
- Website: vhs.leanderisd.org

Vandegrift High School is a public high school in Austin, Texas. It educates students in grades 9-12 for the Leander Independent School District. The school received an overall rating of "A" from the Texas Education Agency for the 2024-2025 school year.

== Demographics ==
The demographic breakdown of the 2,360 students enrolled for the 2025-2026 school year was:

- Male - 51%
- Female - 49%
- White - 58.3%
- Hispanic - 16.2%
- Asian - 15.4%
- Two or More Races - 6.3%
- Black - 3.4%
- American Indian/Alaska Native - 0.3%
- Native Hawaiian/Pacific Islander - 0.1%

== History ==
The school is named for United States Marine Corps First Lieutenant Matthew Ryan Vandegrift, who was killed in action in Basra, Iraq in 2008. The school's first year of operation, 2009, was at adjacent Four Points Middle School, and it then transferred to the Vandegrift campus at the start of the 2010 school year.

== Academics ==
Vandegrift High School has "dual credit" with Austin Community College, which allows juniors and seniors to get college credit while still in high school.

Vandegrift was ranked 54th in the state and 342nd nationally in the 2016 U.S. News & World Report rankings.

26 AP classes are offered as well the International Baccalaureate (IB) Diploma Programme.

== Notable alumni ==
- Dakota Prukop (2012), CFL and USFL player
- Greg Brown III (2020), NBA player
- Ashlea Klam (2023), flag football player
- Blake Frazier (2024), college football player
- Drew Mestemaker (2024), college football player

== Demographics ==
The demographic breakdown of the 2574 students enrolled in 2023-24 was:

- Male - 51%
- Female - 49%
- Asian/Pacific Islander - 16%
- Black - 10%
- Hispanic - 17%
- White - 75%
- Multiracial - 5%

2% of the students were eligible for free or reduced lunch.

== Performing arts ==
Vandegrift has a competitive show choir, the all-female group "Venom".

Vandegrift's marching band has over 400 members. Notable accolades include placing first in the University Interscholastic League (UIL) 2013 Class 4A State Marching Band Competition, winning the 2019 Bands of America (BOA) Grand National Championship in Indianapolis for their debut appearance at the competition, winning the 2023 BOA Super Regional in San Antonio, and winning the UIL Class 6A State Marching Band Championship for 2 years in a row in 2022 and 2023. Their finals performance in the 2023 BOA Super Regional achieved the highest BOA Regional score of all time at 97.600.

Vandegrift's band program also has multiple concert bands with the top honor band/wind ensemble being named the Texas Music Educators Association (TMEA) Class 6A State Honor Band in 2019.

== Accomplishments ==
In 2013, Vandegrift High School took first place at the UIL Class 4A State Marching Band Championships.

In 2014, the girls' soccer team won the UIL Class 4A State Soccer Championship.

In 2014, the boys' golf team won the UIL Class 4A State Golf Championship.

In 2015 and 2016, the boys' golf team won the UIL Class 5A State Golf Championship.

In 2015, the girls’ swim team won the UIL Class 5A State Championship.

In 2016, the boys’ swim team won the UIL Class 5A State Championship.

In 2019, the marching band won the Bands of America Grand Nationals in Indianapolis for the first time.

In 2021 the football team reached the semifinals(won)and made a hard effort to win state but fell short to Desoto Highschool.

In 2022 and 2023, the marching band won the UIL Class 6A State Marching Band Championship.

In 2023 and 2024, the girls golf team won the UIL Class 6A State Championship.

In 2024, the football team won the UIL Class 6A Division II State Championship.

In 2025 the football team made it to the semifinals but sadly lost to Houston C.E. King

In 2025, the boys soccer team won the UIL Class 6A Division II State Championship.
