= John Philip Sousa Foundation =

American band music nonprofit organization

- Formation: 1980
- Type: Non-profit foundation
- Headquarters: Lafayette, Indiana, United States
- President & CEO: Lowell E. Graham
- Key people: Jay Gephart; Douglas Harter; Gerald Guilbeaux; Tim Rhea; Roy Holder; Michael Colburn
- Revenue: $91,026 (2015)
- Expenses: $89,745 (2015)
- Website: www.sousafoundation.net

The John Philip Sousa Foundation is a non-profit foundation dedicated to the promotion of band music internationally. The foundation administers a number of projects and awards supporting high quality band performance, conducting, and composition.

The foundation is named for John Philip Sousa, a prominent composer of American band music in the late 19th and early 20th centuries. Successor to the Sousa Memorial Committee, the organization was reorganized as the John Philip Sousa Foundation in 1980 with support from Louis Sudler, a Chicago real estate developer and arts patron for whom many of the foundation's awards are named.

== Projects ==
Projects of the Sousa Foundation include funding for the main stage at the Kennedy Center in Washington, D.C., honor bands, conducting competitions, awards for outstanding performing ensembles, and bringing attention to historic sites in band history. Many of the foundation's awards are funded through an endowment from Louis and Virginia Sudler, and are collectively known as the "Louis Sudler Awards of Merit".

=== The Sousa National High School Honors Band ===
Founded in 1981, the Sousa National High School Honors Band is an ensemble made up of roughly 100 high school junior and senior musicians, selected from the top applicants worldwide. The band performs semi-regularly at a variety of locations around the United States.

=== The Sudler Flag of Honor ===
The Sudler Flag of Honor is an award bestowed to identify, recognize and honor high school band programs internationally that have demonstrated particularly significant high standards of excellence in concert activities over a period of several years. No school may win the award twice under the same director. The official description of a deserving band is:

The band must have achieved and maintained a high standard of excellence in the concert area over a period of several years. The concert band will have placed itself in situations where there has been opportunity for evaluation by qualified persons or has been rated "superior" at state, regional, or national levels in concert activities. The band program must offer its participants a complete and balanced program of musical activities including concert, solo, ensemble, and marching areas. The band should have performed at regional, state, national, and professional meetings of significance. These can include but are not limited to state music conventions, regional or national MENC meetings, and state or national band association conventions. The director must have been incumbent in his/her position for at least seven years, including the current year. A number of the students in the band should have participated in district and all-state honor bands or similar all-area groups.

The Sudler Flag of Honor is typically considered to be the highest award a high school band can achieve. Sudler Flag laureate bands are automatically included on the Historic Roll of Honor. The following are the recipients of the Sudler Flag since its inception in 1983:

- 1983 – Alice High School Band, Alice, Texas
- 1983 – L. D. Bell High School Band, Hurst, Texas
- 1983 – Georgetown High School Band, Georgetown, Texas
- 1983 – North Hills High School Band, Pittsburgh, Pennsylvania
- 1983 – Papillion-La Vista Senior High School Band, Papillion, Nebraska
- 1983 – Richardson High School Band, Richardson, Texas
- 1983 – Wheat Ridge High School Band, Wheat Ridge, Colorado
- 1984 – Lloyd V. Berkner High School Band, Richardson, Texas
- 1984 – Glenbard East High School Band, Lombard, Illinois
- 1984 – Hardaway High School Band, Columbus, Georgia
- 1984 – Reynoldsburg High School Band, Reynoldsburg, Ohio
- 1984 – Oconomowoc High School Band, Oconomowoc, Wisconsin
- 1985 – Clear Lake High School Band, Houston, Texas
- 1985 – Grand Ledge High School Band, Grand Ledge, Michigan
- 1985 – South Lakes High School Band, Reston, Virginia
- 1985 – Stevens High School Band, Rapid City, South Dakota
- 1985 – Valparaiso High School Band, Valparaiso, Indiana
- 1986 – J.J. Pearce High School Band, Richardson, Texas
- 1986 – Lakeland High School Band, Lakeland, Florida
- 1987 – Auburn High School Band, Auburn, Alabama
- 1987 – Lake Highlands High School Band, Dallas, Texas
- 1988 – Duncanville High School Band, Duncanville, Texas
- 1988 – Lassiter High School Band, Marietta, Georgia
- 1988 – Mason City High School Band, Mason City, Iowa
- 1989 – Coronado High School Band, El Paso, Texas
- 1989 – James Madison High School Band, Vienna, Virginia
- 1989 – Sumter High School Band, Sumter, South Carolina
- 1990 – Herndon High School Band, Herndon, Virginia
- 1991 – Marian Catholic High School Band, Chicago Heights, Illinois
- 1991 – Pearl City High School Band, Pearl City, Hawaii
- 1991 – Robert E. Lee High School Band, Midland, Texas
- 1992 – J.W. Robinson High School Band, Fairfax, Virginia
- 1993 – Lakeland High School Band, Lakeland, Florida
- 1993 – George C. Marshall High School Band, Falls Church, Virginia
- 1994 – Clements High School Band, Sugar Land, Texas
- 1994 – Lake Braddock Secondary School Band, Burke, Virginia
- 1994 – The Colony High School Band, The Colony, Texas
- 1994 – Westfield High School Band, Houston, Texas
- 1995 – W.T. Woodson High School Band, Fairfax, Virginia
- 1995 – Spring High School Band, Spring, Texas
- 1996 – Norcross High School Band, Norcross, Georgia
- 1997 – Klein Forest High School Band, Houston, Texas
- 1997 – Langham Creek High School Band, Houston, Texas
- 1997 – Owasso High School Band, Owasso, Oklahoma
- 1997 – Westmoore High School Band, Oklahoma City, Oklahoma
- 1998 – Jack C. Hays High School Band, Buda, Texas
- 1998 – Westlake High School Band, Austin, Texas
- 1999 – Irmo High School Band, Irmo, South Carolina
- 2000 – Leon High School Band, Tallahassee, Florida
- 2000 – J.J. Pearce High School Band, Richardson, Texas
- 2000 – McLean High School Band, McLean, Virginia
- 2002 – Buchholz High School Band, Gainesville, Florida
- 2003 – North Hardin High School Band, Radcliff, Kentucky
- 2003 – The Woodlands High School Band, The Woodlands, Texas
- 2004 – Dobyns-Bennett High School Band, Kingsport, Tennessee
- 2004 – Lloyd V. Berkner High School Band, Richardson, Texas
- 2005 – J.W. Robinson High School Band, Fairfax, Virginia
- 2005 – Parkview High School Band, Lilburn, Georgia
- 2006 – Friendswood High School Band, Friendswood, Texas
- 2006 – Cypress Falls High School Band, Houston, Texas
- 2006 – Harrison High School Band, Kennesaw, Georgia
- 2007 – Wando High School Band, Mt. Pleasant, South Carolina
- 2007 – John Hersey High School Band, Arlington Heights, Illinois
- 2008 – William Mason High School Band, Mason, Ohio
- 2008 – Lockport Township High School Band, Lockport, Illinois
- 2008 – Poteet High School Band, Mesquite, Texas
- 2008 – Permian High School Band, Odessa, Texas
- 2009 – Neuqua Valley High School Band, Naperville, Illinois
- 2010 – None selected
- 2011 – James Madison High School Band, Vienna, Virginia
- 2011 – Hebron High School Band, Carrollton, Texas
- 2011 – W.T. Woodson High School Band, Fairfax, Virginia
- 2012 – Roxbury High School Band, Succasunna, New Jersey
- 2013 – Marcus High School Band, Flower Mound, Texas
- 2014 – Lafayette High School Band, Lexington, Kentucky
- 2015 – Midlothian High School Band, Midlothian, Texas
- 2015 – Plano East Senior High School Band, Plano, Texas
- 2016 – Brazoswood High School Band, Clute, Texas
- 2017 – Lake Braddock Secondary School Band, Burke, Virginia
- 2017 – McLean High School Band, McLean, Virginia
- 2019 – Crosby High School Band, Crosby, Texas
- 2019 – Hikarigaoka Girls' High School Wind Orchestra, Okazaki, Aichi
- 2020 – Vandegrift High School Band, Austin, Texas
- 2021 – Mansfield Summit High School Band, Arlington, Texas
- 2021 – Vista Ridge High School Band, Cedar Park, Texas
- 2022 – Flower Mound High School Band, Flower Mound, Texas
- 2022 – O'Fallon Township High School Band, O'Fallon, Illinois
- 2023 – Broken Arrow High School Band, Broken Arrow, Oklahoma

=== The Sudler Cup ===
The Sudler Cup is an award bestowed to identify, recognize and honor junior high and middle school concert band programs that have demonstrated particularly significant high standards of excellence in concert activities over a period of several years. The official description of a deserving band is:

The band must have achieved and maintained a high standard of literature in the concert area over a period of several years. The concert band will have placed itself in situations where there has been opportunity for evaluation by qualified persons or has been rated "superior" at state, regional, or national levels in concert activities. The band should have performed at regional, state, national, and professional meetings of significance. These can include but are not limited to state music conventions, regional or national MENC meetings, and state or national band association conventions. The director must have been incumbent in his/her position for at least seven years, including the current year. A number of the students in the band should have participated in district and all-state honor bands or similar all-area groups. The total program of music should exemplify what is considered a sound viable, music education program for this level of endeavor.

The following are the recipients of the Sudler Cup since its inception in 1985:

- 1985 – Morehead Junior High, El Paso, Texas
- 1985 – Asheville Junior High, Asheville, North Carolina
- 1985 – Gunn Junior High, Arlington, Texas
- 1985 – Oconomowoc Junior High, Oconomowoc, Wisconsin
- 1986 – Adamson Junior High, Rex, Georgia
- 1986 – Southwest Junior High, Lakeland, Florida
- 1987 – Morrow Junior High, Morrow, Georgia
- 1988 – Scottsbluff Junior High, Scottsbluff, Nebraska
- 1989 – Richardson North Jr. High, Richardson, Texas
- 1989 – David Crockett Junior High, Odessa, Texas
- 1990 – Murchison Middle School, Austin, Texas
- 1990 – Thoreau Intermediate School, Vienna, Virginia
- 1990 – Westwood Junior High, Dallas, Texas
- 1992 – McAdams Middle School, Dickinson, Texas
- 1992 – Wm. Adams Junior High, Alice, Texas
- 1993 – Highlands Intermediate School, Pearl City, Hawaii
- 1993 – Hodges Bend Middle School, Houston, Texas
- 1994 – DeSoto West Middle School, DeSoto, Texas
- 1994 – Pittman Middle School, Hueytown, Alabama
- 1995 – Prairie Middle School, Hutchinson, Kansas
- 1995 – Herndon Middle School, Herndon, Virginia
- 1997 – Nimitz Jr. High School, Odessa, Texas
- 1997 – Robinson Middle School, Fairfax, Virginia
- 1997 – The Colony Middle School, The Colony, Texas
- 1999 – Longfellow Middle School, Falls Church, Virginia
- 2000 – Irmo Middle School, Columbia, South Carolina
- 2000 – Space Center Intermediate School, Houston, Texas
- 2001 – Gordon A. Bailey Middle School, Austin, Texas
- 2001 – Robert Frost Middle School, Fairfax, Virginia
- 2001 – Lake Braddock Secondary School, Burke, Virginia
- 2002 – First Colony Middle School, Sugar Land, Texas
- 2003 – Coyle Middle School, Rowlett, Texas
- 2003 – Grisham Middle School, Austin, Texas
- 2004 – North Ridge Middle School, North Richland Hills, Texas
- 2004 – Holub Middle School, Houston, Texas
- 2005 – L.J Alleman Middle School, Lafayette, Louisiana
- 2005 – Cooper Middle School, McLean, Virginia
- 2006 – Oliver McCracken Middle School, Skokie, Illinois
- 2007 – Cedar Park Middle School, Cedar Park, Texas
- 2008 – Fort Settlement Middle School, Sugar Land, Texas
- 2010 – Artie Henry Middle School, Cedar Park, Texas
- 2010 – Forbes Middle School, Georgetown, Texas
- 2010 – Space Center Intermediate School, Houston, Texas
- 2011 – Kealing Middle School Wind Ensemble, Austin, Texas
- 2012 – Fort Clarke Middle School Symphonic Band, Gainesville, Florida
- 2012 – West Ridge Middle School Wind Ensemble Band, Austin, Texas
- 2013 – Indian Springs Middle School Band, Keller, Texas
- 2014 – Rice Middle School Wind Ensemble, Plano, Texas
- 2016 – Adelle R. Clark Middle School Band, Frisco, Texas
- 2017 – Canyon Ridge Middle School, Austin, Texas
- 2017 – Cockrill Middle School, McKinney, Texas
- 2017 – Riverwatch Middle School, Suwanee, Georgia
- 2017 – Shadow Ridge Middle School, Flower Mound, Texas
- 2018 – TA Howard Middle School, Mansfield, Texas
- 2019 – Arbor Creek Middle School, Carrollton, Texas
- 2019 – Roma Middle School, Roma, Texas
- 2021 – Cooper Middle School, Fairfax County, Virginia
- 2022 – Berry Miller Junior High School, Pearland, Texas

=== Sudler Trophy ===
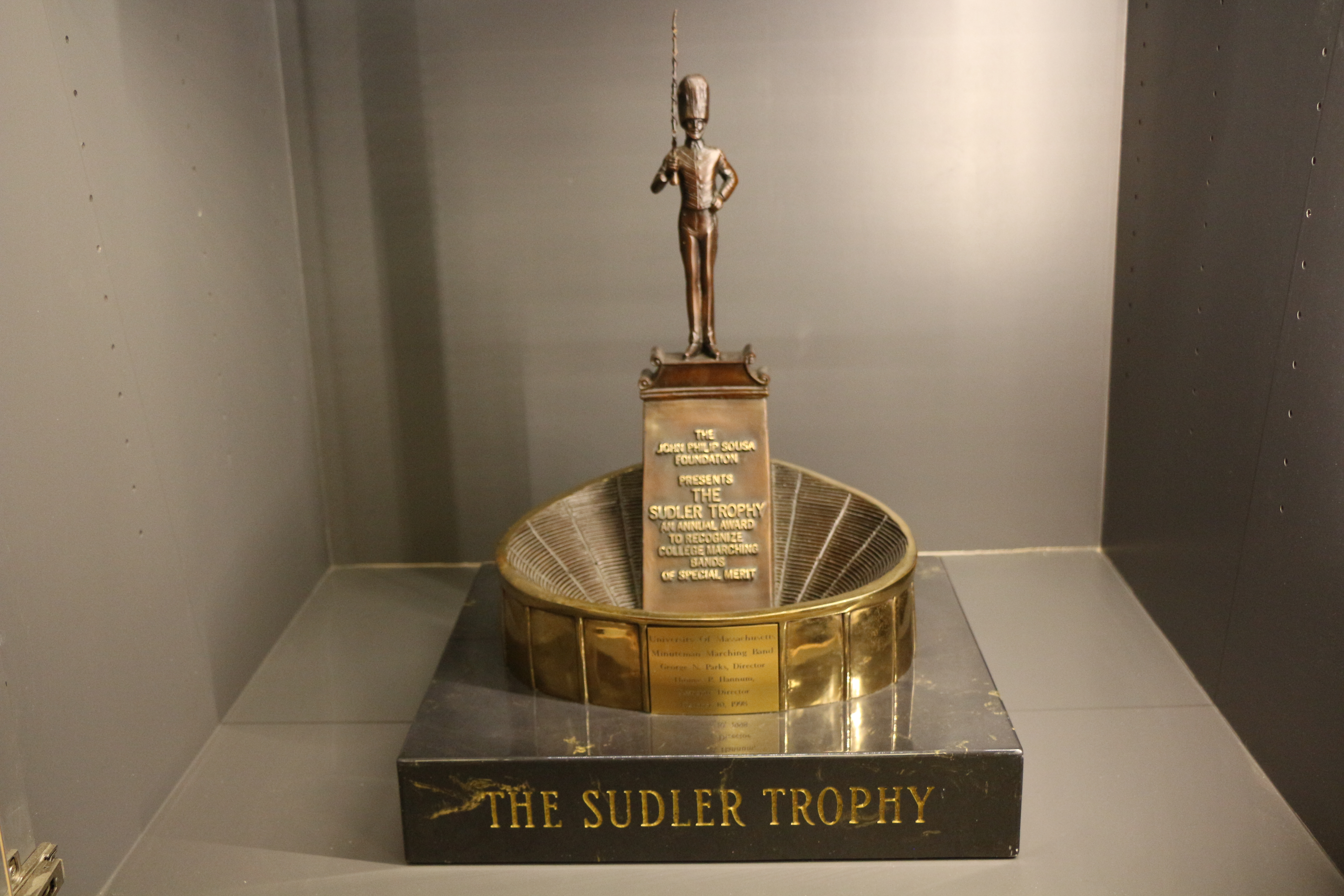
UMass' Sudler Trophy, awarded in 1998

The Sudler Trophy is an award bestowed on one university marching band. It was awarded annually from 1982 to 2007 and biannually since then. Described by a Los Angeles Times reporter as "[t]he Heisman Trophy of the collegiate band world", the award does not represent the winner of any championship, but rather a band surrounded by great tradition that has become respected nationally. No school may be honored with the award twice. According to the official description of the trophy:

The purpose of the Sudler Trophy is to identify and recognize collegiate marching bands of particular excellence who have made outstanding contributions to the American way of life. The Sudler Trophy is awarded annually to a college or university marching band which has demonstrated the highest musical standards and innovative marching routines and ideas, and which has made important contributions to the advancement of the performance standards of college marching bands over a period of years.

The trophy measures exactly 22.5 inches (57 cm) from the base to the tip of the drum major's mace; precisely the size of a standard 8 to 5 step in marching.

The following are the recipients of the Sudler Trophy since its inception in 1982:

List of Sudler Trophy recipients
Year	Marching band	University
1982	Michigan Marching Band	University of Michigan
1983	Marching Illini	University of Illinois Urbana–Champaign
1984	The Ohio State University Marching Band	Ohio State University
1985	Marching 100	Florida Agricultural and Mechanical University
1986	Longhorn Band	University of Texas at Austin
1987	Pride of Oklahoma	University of Oklahoma
1988	Spartan Marching Band	Michigan State University
1989	Marching Jayhawks	University of Kansas
1990	Hawkeye Marching Band	University of Iowa
1991	Sun Devil Marching Band	Arizona State University
1992	Wildcat Marching Band	Northwestern University
1993	Bruin Marching Band	University of California, Los Angeles
1994	Marching Royal Dukes	James Madison University
1995	All-American Marching Band	Purdue University
1996	Cornhusker Marching Band	University of Nebraska–Lincoln
1997	Mountaineer Marching Band	West Virginia University
1998	Minuteman Marching Band	University of Massachusetts Amherst
1999	Goin' Band from Raiderland	Texas Tech University
2000	Georgia Redcoat Marching Band	University of Georgia
2001	Fightin' Texas Aggie Band	Texas A&M University
2002	Tiger Marching Band	Louisiana State University
2003	Million Dollar Band	University of Alabama
2004	Auburn University Marching Band	Auburn University
2005	Penn State Blue Band	Pennsylvania State University
2006	Razorback Marching Band	University of Arkansas
2007	Marching Hundred	Indiana University Bloomington
2009	Pride of the Mountains	Western Carolina University
2011	Band of the Fighting Irish	University of Notre Dame
2013	The Pride of the Sunshine	University of Florida
2015	The Pride of Wildcat Land	Kansas State University
2017	Iowa State University Cyclone Football 'Varsity' Marching Band	Iowa State University
2019	"Incomparable" Golden Rams Marching Band	West Chester University
2022	The Marching Southerners	Jacksonville State University
2024	The Pride of Arizona	University of Arizona
2026	Famous Maroon Band	Mississippi State University

=== The Sudler Shield ===
The Sudler Shield recognizes outstanding high school marching bands.

The following are the recipients of the Sudler Shield:

- 1987 – Enterprise High School, Enterprise, Alabama
- 1987 – Federal Hocking High School, Stewart, Ohio
- 1987 – Mountain Crest High School, Hyrum, Utah
- 1987 – Tenri Seminary High School, Nara, Japan
- 1988 – Cambridge High School, Cambridge, Ohio
- 1988 – Clovis High School, Clovis, California
- 1988 – John Overton High School, Nashville, Tennessee
- 1989 – Grove City High School, Grove City, Ohio
- 1989 – Mills E. Godwin High School, Richmond, Virginia
- 1989 – Manzano High School, Albuquerque, New Mexico
- 1989 – Mt. Juliet High School, Mount Juliet, Tennessee
- 1989 – Neuces Canyon High School, Barksdale, Texas
- 1989 – Newton High School, Pleasant Hill, Ohio
- 1989 – Norwin High School, North Huntingdon Township, Pennsylvania
- 1990 – Clinton High School, Clinton, Mississippi
- 1991 – Lafayette High School, Lexington, Kentucky
- 1992 – Coronado High School Band, El Paso, Texas
- 1992 – John Overton High School, Nashville, Tennessee
- 1992 – North Hardin High School, Radcliff, Kentucky
- 1992 – Pope High School, Marietta, Georgia
- 1993 – Fred C. Beyer High School, Modesto, California
- 1993 – Sumter High School, Sumter, South Carolina
- 1994 – McGavock High School, Nashville, Tennessee
- 1996 – Paul Laurence Dunbar High School, Lexington, Kentucky
- 1997 – Marian Catholic High School, Chicago Heights, Illinois
- 1998 – Duncanville High School, Duncanville, Texas
- 1998 – Lafayette High School, Lexington, Kentucky
- 1998 – Lassiter High School, Marietta, Georgia
- 1998 – Pupuk Kaltim School, Bontang, Kaltim, Indonesia
- 1999 – Broken Arrow High School, Broken Arrow, Oklahoma
- 1999 – Harrison County High School, Cynthiana, Kentucky
- 1999 – Westfield High School, Houston, Texas
- 2000 – Aimachi Marching Band, Handa, Aichi, Japan
- 2000 – Lawrence Central High School, Indianapolis, Indiana
- 2001 – James F. Byrnes High School, Duncan, South Carolina
- 2002 – Kashiwa City High School, Kashiwa, Japan
- 2002 – Kennesaw Mountain High School, Kennesaw, Georgia
- 2002 – Yokohama Marching Band, Yokohama, Japan
- 2003 – Allen High School, Allen, Texas
- 2003 – Seminole High School, Seminole, Florida
- 2004 – Collins Hill High School, Suwanee, Georgia
- 2004 – L.D. Bell High School, Hurst, Texas
- 2004 – Owasso High School, Owasso, Oklahoma
- 2005 – James Bowie High School, Austin, Texas
- 2005 – Show and Marchingband Kunst & Genoegen, Leiden, Netherlands
- 2005 – Paul Laurence Dunbar High School, Lexington, Kentucky
- 2005 – Ronald Reagan High School, San Antonio, Texas
- 2006 – Cedar Park High School, Cedar Park, Texas
- 2006 – Langham Creek High School, Houston, Texas
- 2007 – Avon High School, Avon, Indiana
- 2007 – Marcus High School, Flower Mound, Texas
- 2008 – Broken Arrow High School, Broken Arrow, Oklahoma
- 2008 – Coppell High School, Coppell, Texas
- 2008 – Musica Grato High School, Himi, Toyama, Japan
- 2008 – Tarpon Springs High School, Tarpon Springs, Florida
- 2009 – American Fork High School, American Fork, Utah
- 2009 – Chonkanyanukoon High School, Amphur Muang, Chomburi, Thailand
- 2009 – Walton High School, Marietta, Georgia
- 2009 – The Woodlands High School, The Woodlands, Texas
- 2010 – Hebron High School, Carrollton, Texas
- 2010 – Westlake High School, Austin, Texas
- 2011 – Sultanah Asma Marching Band, Kedah, Malaysia
- 2011 – Homestead High School, Fort Wayne, Indiana
- 2011 – William Mason High School, Mason, Ohio
- 2012 – Carmel High School, Carmel, Indiana
- 2012 – Plano East Senior High School, Plano, Texas
- 2013 – Blue Springs High School, Blue Springs, Missouri
- 2013 – Calgary Stampede Showband, Calgary, Alberta
- 2013 – James Bowie High School, Austin, Texas
- 2013 – Kanagawa Prefecture Shonandai High School, Fujisawa, Kanagawa, Japan
- 2014 – Claudia Taylor Johnson High School, San Antonio, Texas
- 2014 – Dobyns-Bennett High School, Kingsport, Tennessee
- 2014 – Franklin High School, Franklin, Tennessee
- 2014 – Round Rock High School, Round Rock, Texas
- 2015 – Broken Arrow High School, Broken Arrow, Oklahoma
- 2015 – Keller High School, Keller, Texas
- 2016 – Castle High School, Newburgh, Indiana
- 2016 – Chien Kuo Senior High School, Taipei City, Taiwan
- 2016 – Keat Hwa Secondary School, Alor Setar, Malaysia
- 2016 – Russell County High School, Russell Springs, Kentucky
- 2016 – Vista Murrieta High School, Murrieta, California
- 2017 – Flower Mound High School, Flower Mound, Texas
- 2017 – Greendale High School, Greendale, Wisconsin
- 2017 – Morton High School, Morton, Illinois
- 2017 – Vista Ridge High School, Cedar Park, Texas
- 2018 – Adair County High School, Columbia, Kentucky
- 2018 – Carmel High School, Carmel, Indiana
- 2018 – North Lamar High School, Paris, Texas
- 2018 – The Woodlands High School, The Woodlands, Texas
- 2019 – Mineola High School, Mineola, Texas
- 2019 – Vandegrift High School, Austin, Texas
- 2021 – Brownsburg High School, Brownsburg, Indiana
- 2021 – Southlake Carroll High School, Southlake, Texas
- 2021 – Wakeland High School, Frisco, Texas
- 2021 – Murray High School (Kentucky), Murray, Kentucky
- 2021 – Canton High School (Texas), Canton, Texas
- 2022 – William Mason High School, Mason, Ohio
- 2022 – Fishers High School, Fishers, Indiana
- 2022 – Beechwood High School, Fort Mitchell, Kentucky
- 2022 – Anderson County High School, Lawrenceburg, Kentucky
- 2022 – Door Vriendschap Sterk, Katwijk, Netherlands
- 2023 – Bentonville High School, Bentonville, Arkansas
- 2023 – Bridgeland High School, Cypress, Texas
- 2023 – O'Fallon Township High School, O'Fallon, Illinois
- 2023 – Waxahachie High School, Waxahachie, Texas
- 2023 – Estill County High School, Irvine, Kentucky
- 2024 – Marcus High School, Flower Mound, Texas
- 2024 – Seven Lakes High School, Katy, Texas
- 2024 – Krum High School, Krum, Texas
- 2025 – Cedar Park High School, Cedar Park, Texas
- 2025 – Dripping Springs High School, Dripping Springs, Texas
- 2025 – Rouse High School, Leander, Texas
- 2025 – Kiski Area High School, Vandergrift, Pennsylvania
- 2025 – Raymondville High School, Raymondville, Texas
- 2025 – Bassett High School, Bassett, Virginia

=== The Sudler Silver Scroll ===
The Sudler Scroll recognizes and honors those community bands that have demonstrated particularly high standards of excellence in concert activities over a period of several years, and which have played a significant and leading role in the cultural and musical environment in their respective communities.

Those community concert bands which have won the award include:

- Northshore Concert Band, Evanston, Illinois (1987)
- Lawrence City Band, Lawrence, Kansas (1988)
- Kiel Municipal Band, Kiel, Wisconsin (1990)
- Tacoma Concert Band, Tacoma, Washington (1990)
- Allentown Band, Allentown, Pennsylvania (1990)
- Naperville Municipal Band, Naperville, Illinois (1991)
- Sarasota Mobile Home Band, Sarasota, Florida (1993)
- Austin Symphonic Band, Austin, Texas (1993)
- Racine Municipal Band, Racine, Wisconsin (1994)
- Lansing Concert Band, Lansing, Michigan (1994)
- Texas Wind Symphony, Arlington, Texas (1995)
- Medalist Concert Band, Bloomington, Minnesota (1995)
- Kent Stark Concert Band, Canton, Ohio (1996)
- Scottsdale Concert Band, Scottsdale, Arizona (1996)
- Ridgewood Concert Band, Ridgewood, New Jersey (1996)
- Tara Winds Concert Band, Hampton, Georgia (1996)
- Coastal Communities Concert Band, San Diego, California (1997)
- Lakeland Civic Band, Kirtland, Ohio (1997)
- Twin City Concert Band, West Monroe, Louisiana (1997)
- San Jose Wind Symphony, San Jose, California (1998)
- Corpus Christi Wind Symphony, Corpus Christi, Texas (1998)
- Community Band of Brevard, Brevard County, Florida (1999)
- Lafayette Concert Band, Lafayette, Louisiana (1999)
- Virginia Grand Military Band, Arlington, Virginia (2000)
- Allentown Band, Allentown, Pennsylvania (1990)
- Lafayette Citizens Band, Lafayette, Indiana (2001)
- Pensacola Civic Band, Pensacola, Florida (2002)
- Tempe Wind Ensemble, Tempe, Arizona (2002)
- Atlanta Wind Symphony, Atlanta, Georgia (2003)
- Houston Symphonic Band, Houston, Texas (2003)
- Penn Central Wind Band, Lewisburg, Pennsylvania (2004)
- City of Fairfax Band, Fairfax, Virginia (2004)
- West Michigan Winds, Muskegon, Michigan (2005)
- Knightwind Ensemble, Milwaukee, Wisconsin (2005)
- South Jersey Area Wind Ensemble, Egg Harbor Township, New Jersey (2006)
- Oregon Symphonic Band, Portland, Oregon (2007)
- Tennessee Concert Band, Knoxville, Tennessee (2007)
- East Winds Symphonic Band, Pittsburgh, Pennsylvania (2008)
- Minnesota Symphonic Winds, Edina, Minnesota (2009)
- Cobb Wind Symphony, Marietta, Georgia (2009)
- Savannah River Winds, North Augusta, South Carolina (2010)
- Virginia Wind Symphony, Norfolk, Virginia (2011)
- Lone Star Symphonic Band, Houston, Texas (2012)
- Lake Oswego Millennium Concert Band, Lake Oswego, Oregon (2013)
- Concord Band, Concord, Massachusetts (2013)
- East Texas Symphonic Band, Longview, Texas (2014)
- Metropolitan Wind Symphony, Boston, Massachusetts (2015)
- Sierra Nevada Wind Orchestra, Gold River, California (2015)
- Montgomery County Concert Band, Hatfield, Pennsylvania (2017)
- Waukesha Area Symphonic Band, Oconomowoc, Wisconsin (2017)
- Carrollton Wind Symphony, Frisco, Texas (2017)
- Buffalo Niagara Concert Band, Buffalo, New York (2018)
- Fairfax Wind Symphony, Fairfax, Virginia (2019)
- The Woodlands Concert Band, The Woodlands, Texas (2021)
- The Heart of Texas Concert Band, San Antonio, Texas (2022)
- The First Coast Wind Symphony, Jacksonville, Florida (2023)

=== The Sudler International Composition Competition ===
The Sudler International Composition Competition is a biennial competition for wind band composition.

The following are the winners of the competition since its inception in 1983:

Year	Composition	Composer
1983	Concerto for Wind Ensemble	Karel Husa
1985	Winds of Nagual	Michael Colgrass
1987	Piece of Mind	Dana Wilson
1989	Symphony No. 1 "The Lord of the Rings"	Johan de Meij
1991	American Games	Nicholas Maw
1993	Passacaglia (Homage on B-A-C-H)	Ron Nelson
1997	Dance Movements	Philip Sparke
