= Atsushi Harada =

Japanese actor (born 1978)

- 原田篤
- Born: July 19, 1978 (age 47); Handa, Aichi, Japan
- Occupation: Actor
- Years active: 1998–present
- Notable credit(s): Kamen Rider 555 as Kamen Rider Delta, Kyuukyuu Sentai GoGo-V as Shou Tatsumi / Go Green
- Spouse: Naomi Akimoto (m. 2003)

Atsushi Harada (原田 篤, Harada Atsushi; born July 19, 1978) is a Japanese actor in the Tokusatsu genre. He is best known for being Kamen Rider Delta in Kamen Rider 555, and Shou Tatsumi/Go Green in the 1999 Super Sentai Series Kyuukyuu Sentai GoGo-V, and reprised his role in the Sentai Teamup Special Timeranger vs. GoGo-V and Gokaiger. He was also involved in a band with GoGo-V co-star Masashi Taniguchi called [G]. In 2012, he worked with the Aimachi Marching Band on their 50th anniversary concert event Evolution where he served as a Story Teller.

== Filmography ==
- GTO: Great Teacher Onizuka (1998; live-action TV drama) – Shinichi Tohgo – Debut role
- Kyuukyuu Sentai GoGo-V (1999; tokusatsu) – Shou Tatsumi/Go Green
- Kamen Rider 555 (2003; live-action TV) – Shuji Mihara / Kamen Rider Delta
- Kaizoku Sentai Gokaiger (2011-2012; Tokusatsu) - Shou Tatsumi/GoGreen (Cameo)
- Total Drama: Pahkitew Island (2014; Animated series) – Topher – Dubbing role
