= Yukiko Nakahori =

Japanese campaign model for the bone marrow bank (1971–1993)

- 中堀 由希子
- Born: November 14, 1971
- Died: January 12, 1993 (aged 21)
- Cause of death: Death from illness (liver failure due to graft-versus-host disease associated with bone marrow transplantation)

Yukiko Nakahori (November 14, 1971 - January 12, 1993) was a Japanese woman who worked as a campaign model for the bone marrow bank. Born in Okazaki City, Aichi Prefecture. After developing chronic myeloid leukemia at age 18, she traveled extensively, giving lectures and appearing on television to advocate for donor registration with the bone marrow bank. On November 13, 1992 (Heisei 4), she received Japan's first overseas air-transported bone marrow transplant. However, she developed complications and passed away 60 days after the transplant.

In the summer of 1993, after her death, a spot commercial using footage of Yukiko aired as part of Mainichi Broadcasting System's (MBS) bone marrow transplant awareness campaign “The Miracle of the 100,000th Person.” This led to a surge in inquiries about donor registration. After the campaign expanded nationwide, the number of registrants skyrocketed, generating a significant response.

In 1994 (Heisei 6), Makoto Endo's reportage “Farewell at 21” (published during her lifetime) was released. That same year, Mainichi Broadcasting System adapted it into a television drama.. Also in 1994, Aimoto Mizuho's shōjo manga “Yukiko - Shining Life -”, featuring Yukiko as the protagonist, was published.

== Hers life ==
=== Until the onset of the disease ===
November 14, 1971 (Showa 46), at 9:54 AM, she was born as the first daughter to her father, Tokuyuki, and mother, Chikako, at Okazaki Municipal Hospital (present-day Okazaki City Hospital) in Okazaki City, Aichi Prefecture [Note 1]. Although she was healthy at birth, she frequently developed fevers reaching 39 degrees Celsius after discharge from the hospital. At age three, while attending nursery school, she contracted bacterial meningitis and was hospitalized. However, after this episode, she rarely experienced fever or fatigue, except when spending long periods outdoors.

In April 1978 (Showa 53), she enrolled at Okazaki Municipal Mutsuna Elementary School. Throughout her elementary school years, she was consistently bright and humorous, always at the center of after-school play. In April 1984 (Showa 59), she entered Okazaki Municipal Ryukai Junior High School and chose Hikarigaoka Girls' High School, a Catholic private girls' high school, as her next educational path.

During the summer vacation of her second year of high school, she participated in a short-term study abroad program at Sacred Heart Girls' College in New Zealand, a sister school of Hikarigaoka Girls' High School, experiencing a three-week homestay. This experience became the catalyst for her aspiration to study abroad in New Zealand after graduation. Due to school regulations requiring students planning to study abroad to have a post-study destination secured, she decided to enroll at the Nagoya Campus of the Nagoya International Tourism College, where she would study travel administration and related subjects, thereby gaining eligibility for her overseas studies.

=== Onset at the place of study abroad ===
In March 1990, she graduated from Hikarigaoka Girls' High School. Starting in April, she embarked on a one-year study abroad program at Southern Cross Language School in New Zealand, which accepted graduates from three Japanese girls' high schools, including Hikarigaoka. She stayed with a host family introduced by the school. She departed Japan on April 2 and arrived in Christchurch the following day, beginning her study abroad life.

However, her health deteriorated immediately after arrival. By around May, she experienced significant fatigue, such as becoming short of breath after even a short run. After returning home from a bus hike on October 11, she developed a headache and fever. As her condition did not improve, she visited Christchurch Central Hospital with her host mother on October 18 for blood tests. These revealed her white blood cell count had reached 479,000 - approximately 100 times the normal level—and she was diagnosed with chronic myeloid leukemia.

This necessitated emergency hospitalization, where a procedure to remove white blood cells was performed. He returned to Japan on November 3 and was admitted to Nagoya Daiichi Red Cross Hospital (now the Japanese Red Cross Aichi Medical Center Nagoya Daiichi Hospital) on November 5. However, he had no subjective symptoms and was so energetic that he hardly seemed like a patient. He rarely slept, often spending time near the vending machines or public phones, and would suddenly leave to meet friends. During his 85-day hospitalization, he took a total of 8 overnight leaves, amounting to 36 days. He was discharged the following year on January 28, 1991, and registered as a patient with the Tokai Bone Marrow Bank on February 5.

=== To marrow bank activities ===
On September 10, 1991, he was readmitted to Daiichi Jikai Hospital due to his white blood cell count rising again to nearly 50,000. Shortly after readmission, he was introduced to Kazuo Iso[Note 2], another chronic myeloid leukemia patient involved in the bone marrow bank movement, by a roommate. Iso proposed that he appear on television to encourage donor registration. He also received an invitation from Kenichi Kamiyama[Note 3], a fellow CML patient and ceramic artist involved in the bone marrow bank movement, to join the bone marrow bank movement together once he recovered. On December 13, through Iso's mediation, she met for the first time with Takako Otani, a director of the Tokai Marrow Donor Program and a former chronic myeloid leukemia patient who had received a bone marrow transplant from her mother.

Following these events, Yukiko agreed to media exposure. On January 24, 1992, filming took place for “Bond of Life”, the first donor recruitment PR video produced by the Marrow Transplant Promotion Foundation. In April, she received consecutive speaking requests at the Koriyama Chamber of Commerce and Industry Hall and JGSDF Camp Koriyama in Koriyama City, Fukushima Prefecture, followed by a symposium in Gifu Prefecture. Starting with her first lecture at the Koriyama Chamber of Commerce and Industry Hall, she appealed for donor registration. At the Camp Koriyama, the Operations Officer in attendance offered his cooperation after hearing Yukiko's story. Through his mediation, opportunities for lectures were arranged at various garrisons, leading to a series of subsequent “Self-Defense Forces tours”.

On January 17, 1992, through Takako's mediation, footage of Yukiko attending that year's Coming-of-Age Ceremony was broadcast on TV Aichi, marking her first television appearance. From then on, she began receiving requests for interviews from various stations.

=== Marrow transplant and death ===
While continuing her campaign to encourage donor registration, no one within Yukiko's family or relatives was found to be a suitable donor with sufficiently compatible human leukocyte antigen (HLA) types. Nor could a match be found in the Tokai Marrow Bank, which at the time had Japan's largest donor registry.

Dr. Yoshihisa Kodera, the attending physician at Nagoya Daiichi Red Cross Hospital, had requested a donor search from the National Marrow Donor Program (NMP) in the United States even before the Japan Marrow Donor Program (JMDP), established in December 1991, began patient registration (June 1992). On March 20th, he received notification of a potential donor matching through secondary testing. After Yukiko provided samples, confirmation of a match through tertiary testing arrived on July 27th. Due to cost considerations and Yukiko's wishes, Kotera planned for the transplant to occur in Japan. Since the National Marrow Donor Program would not provide the marrow unless the hospital was certified, preparations proceeded in parallel with Nagoya Daiichi Red Cross Hospital's certification process. Meanwhile, a tumor appearing to be a precursor to acute transformation emerged on Yukiko's neck. She was hospitalized on September 24 and underwent surgery on October 1.

The transplant surgery took place on November 13. Yukiko was the first case in Japan to receive bone marrow fluid from abroad. Since transplantation was ideally performed within 24 hours of collection, arrangements were made to minimize transport time. The marrow arrived at Narita Airport at 4:00 PM, with procedures estimated to take 15 minutes. However, due to measures by the Ministry of Finance Customs and Tariff Bureau and the Ministry of Justice Immigration Services Agency of Japan, processing was completed in just 6 minutes. Furthermore, the Cessna aircraft chartered for transport from Narita to Nagoya Airport was granted priority landing at Nagoya Airport. The transport from the airport to the hospital was escorted by an ambulance and accompanied by a patrol car, arriving at the hospital at 6:11 PM, 19 minutes ahead of schedule.

At 19:05, the infusion of bone marrow fluid into her body began via her left arm, concluding at 21:12. As this was Japan's first transplant using bone marrow fluid from overseas, the hospital was flooded with media. A press conference began at 20:00, during which Takako Ohtani read a message of gratitude from Yukiko.

However, on November 17, the fourth day after the transplant, she developed a fever. On December 4, she was moved from the sterile room to a private room, where he could watch TV and eat meals. However, starting that same month, graft-versus-host disease (GVHD) became markedly apparent, causing jaundice that turned hers face and even the whites of hers eyes yellow. By early January 1993 (Heisei 5), she began experiencing temporary vision loss, seeing hallucinations at night, and experiencing prolonged periods of drowsiness.

On January 11, he lost sensation in both sides of his body. While she could answer questions from nurses about his age, she could no longer recall the date or the names of nurses who had cared for him for a long time. He fell asleep at 3:00 PM and never woke up again. At 3:35 AM on the 12th, she lost the ability to breathe spontaneously. He died at 3:42 AM that day, 60 days after the transplant. The cause of death was liver failure complicated by graft-versus-host disease.

The funeral service was held on the 14th in Okazaki City, attended by approximately 300 people, including friends and supporters of the bone marrow bank. Condolence telegrams and floral baskets were sent from across the nation

== After death ==
Following Yukiko's death, Nagoya Daiichi Red Cross Hospital performed two bone marrow transplants in 1993 using marrow provided by the National Marrow Donor Program. These two transplants proved that marrow from Caucasian donors could successfully engraft in Japanese recipients. Regarding the emergence of other hospitals seeking accreditation with the National Marrow Donor Program, Endo Masayoshi stated, “Without Yukiko's transplant achievements, this would undoubtedly not have been realized so quickly”.

== Personal life ==
She had a bright and outgoing personality, always being the center of attention during high school. She possessed looks that both she and others acknowledged as “cute.” She would entertain her classmates by imitating the protagonist, a young lady, from the popular manga at the time, “I Am Reiko Shiratori!”. Furthermore, during the summer of her second year of high school, she auditioned for the “Lotte CM Idol '88” contest, passed the first screening, and advanced to the Nagoya regional preliminary round.

Yukiko frequently quarreled with her younger sister Kumiko since childhood. After returning home following her leukemia diagnosis, she tried to make Kumiko do everything for her, using her illness as an excuse. However, after being readmitted to the hospital, she became kinder to her sister, and their relationship improved. When Kumiko, who had entered Hikarigaoka Girls' High School like her sister, consulted Yukiko about considering becoming a medical secretary after graduating high school, Yukiko supported her choice. After Yukiko's death, Kumiko enrolled in a vocational school in Nagoya City in April 1993 to study medical administration.

== Bibliography ==
- Endo (March 30, 1994). 21歳の別離 中堀由希子 白血病とのたたかいに青春の死をかけて. Gakken. ISBN 9784054002531.
- Kuno, Tetsuhiro (October 19, 1994). いのち煌めいて 由希子 白血病と闘った青春. Tokyo Shimbun Publishing Bureau. ISBN 9784808305079.
