= Ktož jsú boží bojovníci =

15th-century Hussite war song

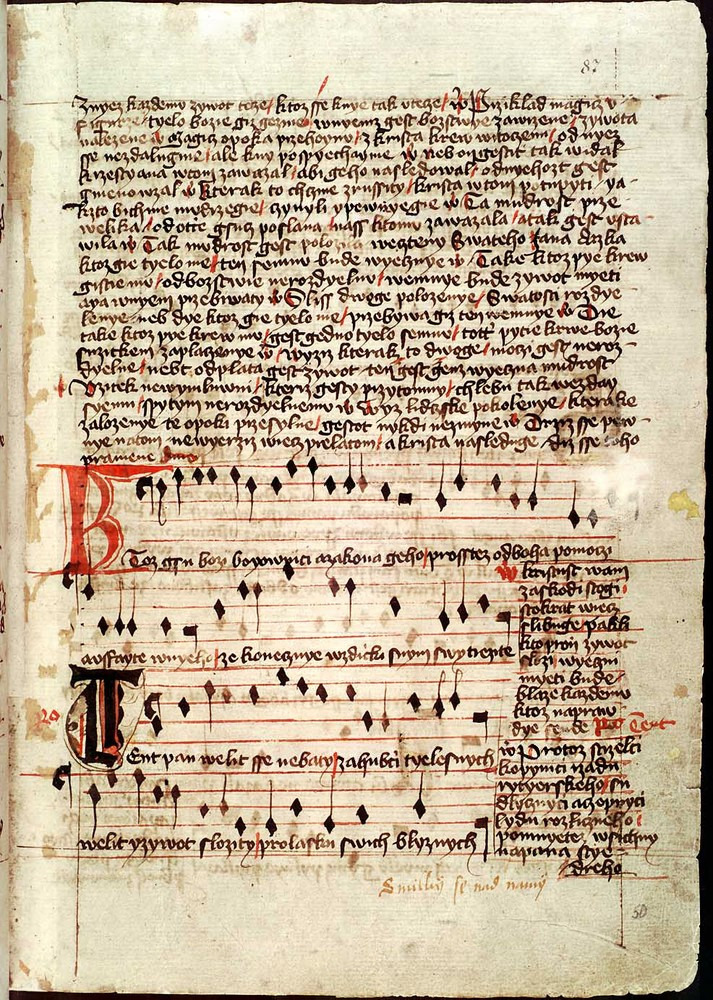

"Ye Who Are Warriors of God", the English translation of "Ktož jsú Boží bojovníci" from Old Czech, is a 15th-century Hussite war song. Alternate modern Czech spellings of the title are: "Kdož jsou Boží bojovníci" and "Kdo jsou Boží bojovníci". It was first recorded in the Jistebnice hymn book.

== History and use ==
The song was sung with such intensity during the Hussite Wars that it instilled fear throughout some enemy armies, making it a weapon in itself. One of the Imperial Crusades is believed to have fled the battlefield before the battle itself after hearing the Hussites singing their hymn. The hymn would be led by a Hussite priest, carrying a ceremonial axe.

At the start of the 1433 war between the Polish and the Teutonic Knights of Prussia, the Hussites signed an alliance against the Germans in July 1433. In the course of the war, they marched all the way to the Baltic sea at the town of Danzig. The Prussian 19th-century historian, Heinrich von Treitschke, makes a clearly indignant reference to the Hussite taking of land near the Baltic Sea and to "Kdož jsou Boží bojovníci" with these words: "greeted the sea with a wild Czech song about God's warriors and filled their water bottles with brine in token that the Baltic once more obeyed the Slavs."

The song was used by Bedřich Smetana in his tone poems Tábor and "Blaník," and in a Czech march entitled "Slava chodsku" (Hail to the Chod Country!"). It was also combined with a Catholic carol sung during the time of King Wenceslaus IV by Antonín Dvořák in his work Husitská ouvertura (Hussite Overture). Composer Pavel Haas used it as material in his Suite for Oboe and Piano op. 12 (1939). Karel Husa also incorporated the tune in his Music for Prague 1968, as did Karl Amadeus Hartmann in the Concerto funebre (1939, rev. 1959).

== Lyrics (English translation) ==
Ye who are God's warriors and of his law,
Pray to God for help and have faith in Him;
That always with Him you will be victorious.

Christ is worth all your sacrifices, He will pay you back an hundredfold.
If you give up your life for Him you will receive eternal life.
Happy is he who dies fighting for the truth.

The Lord commandeth you not to fear those who harm the body,
And commandeth you to even put your life down for the love of your brothers.

Therefore, archers, crossbowmen, halberdiers of knightly rank,
Scythemen and macebearers from all walks of life,
Remember always the Lord benevolent.

Do not fear your enemies, nor gaze upon their number,
Keep the Lord in your hearts; for Him fight on,
And before enemies you need not flee.

Since ages past Czechs have said and had proverbs which state,
That if the leader is good, so too is the journey. (Note: The noun jiezda (spelled jízda in Modern Czech) rendered here as "journey" has multiple closely related meanings. "Cavalry" is another possible translation.)

Remember all of you the password which was given out.
Obey your captains and guard one another.
Stay sharp and everyone keep formation.

You beggars and wrongdoers, remember your soul!
For greed and theft don't lose your life.
And pay no heed to the spoils of war.

And with this happily cry out – saying, "At thee! Have at thee!"
Grasp the weapon in your hands and shout, "God is our Lord!"
