= Ron Nelson (composer) =

American composer (1929–2023)

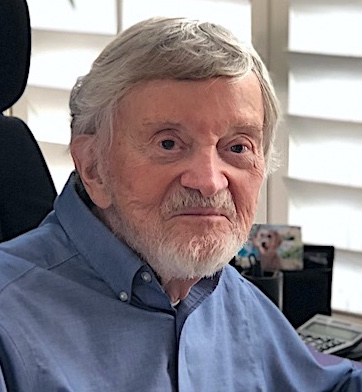
Nelson in 2019

Ronald Jack Nelson (December 14, 1929 – December 24, 2023) was an American composer of classical music and popular music and a music educator.

== Biography ==
Nelson was born December 14, 1929, in Joliet, Illinois. He studied composition at the Eastman School of Music at the University of Rochester, earning a bachelor's degree in 1952, a master's degree in 1953, and a doctorate in composition in 1957. His teachers at Eastman included Louis Mennini, Bernard Rogers and Howard Hanson. In 1954–1955 he studied with Tony Aubin in France at the Ecole Normale de Musique and at the Paris Conservatory under a Fulbright Grant. In 1956, Dr. Nelson joined the faculty of Brown University in Providence, Rhode Island, where he served as chairman of the music department from 1963 to 1973, retiring as Professor Emeritus in 1993.

In 1991, Nelson was awarded the Acuff Chair of Excellence in the Creative Arts, the first musician to hold the chair. His Passacaglia (Homage on B-A-C-H) was the first piece to win all three major wind band composition prizes during one period — the National Band Association Prize, the American Bandmasters Association Ostwald Award, and the Sudler International Prize. He was awarded the Medal of Honor by the John Philip Sousa Foundation in 1994. In 2006, he was awarded an honorary doctorate from Oklahoma City University.

Nelson received numerous commissions, including those from the National Symphony Orchestra, the Rochester Philharmonic, the USAF Band and Chorus, Musashino Wind Ensemble, Aspen Music Festival and numerous colleges and universities. He has also received grants and awards from The Rockefeller Foundation, the Howard Foundation, ASCAP, and several from the National Endowment for the Arts.

Conductor Leonard Slatkin described Ron Nelson as a "quintessential American composer". He noted:

...he has the ability to move between conservative and newer styles with ease. The fact that he's a little hard to categorize is what makes him interesting.

Nelson resided with his wife, Michele, in Scottsdale, Arizona. He died on December 24, 2023, at the age of 94.

== Selected works ==
=== Orchestral works ===
- 1952 Savannah River Holiday
- 1958 Sarabande for Katharine in April
- 1960 This Is The Orchestra
- 1960 Jubilee
- 1961 Toccata for Orchestra
- 1969 Trilogy: JFK-MLK-RFK
- 1969 Rocky Point Holiday
- 1976 Five Pieces after Paintings by Andrew Wyeth
- 1996 Panels (Epiphanies 11)
- 1997 Resonances 11

=== Works for wind ensemble ===
- 1958 Mayflower Overture
- 1969 Rocky Point Holiday
- 1973 Savannah River Holiday
- 1982 Fanfare for a Celebration
- 1982 Medieval Suite
- 1983 Pebble Beach Sojourn for organ, brass and percussion
- 1984 Aspen Jubilee
- 1985 Danza Capriccio for solo alto saxophone and wind ensemble
- 1988 Te Deum Laudamus for SATB chorus and wind ensemble
- 1989 Morning Alleluias
- 1989 Fanfare For The Hour of Sunrise
- 1990 Resonances 1
- 1991 Lauds (Praise High Day)
- 1992 To The Airborne
- 1992 Passacaglia (Homage on B-A-C-H)
- 1994 Epiphanies – Fanfares and Chorales
- 1994 Chaconne (In Memoriam...)
- 1994 Sonoran Desert Holiday
- 1995 Epiphanies (Fanfares and Chorales)
- 1995 Nightsong (Homage Howard Hanson)
- 1995 Fanfare For The Kennedy Center
- 1995 Courtly Airs and Dances
- 1999 Fanfare for the new Millennium for symphonic band and two antiphonal brass choirs
- 2006 Pastorale: Autumn Rune
- 2019 Homage to Landini

=== Stage works ===
- 1954 Dance in Ruins Ballet
- 1955–1956 The Birthday of the Infanta Opera for Chamber Orchestra
- 1981 Hamaguchi Opera for Chamber Ensemble

=== Chamber music ===
- 1982 Kristen's Song for Violin, Flute, and Organ
- 1983 And the Moon Rose Golden for Cello and Piano

=== Choral music ===
- 1958 Three Mountain Ballads for women's chorus or SATB
- 1958 Choral Fanfare for Easter for mixed chorus and narrator
- 1960 Fanfare for a Festival for mixed chorus, brass and timpani
- 1961 Behold Man for men's chorus
- 1962 Three Ancient Prayers for SATB and organ
- 1963 Triumphal Te Deum for double chorus, brass, organ, and percussion
- 1964 Oratorio: What is Man? in three movements, for narrator, soprano solo and baritone solo, mixed chorus, and orchestra
- 1968 Autumn Night (women’s chorus and piano; text by Alice Streatch)
- 1969 Alleluia, July 20, 1969 for mixed chorus
- 1972 Prayer of Emperor of China on the Altar of Heaven, December 21, 1539 for mixed chorus and ensemble
- 1977 Four Pieces After The Seasons for mixed chorus
- 1981 Mass of Saint LaSalle for mixed chorus, organ, mallet instruments, pianos, and percussion
- 1982 Three Nocturnal Pieces for mixed chorus, solo viola, piano and percussion
- 1983 Three Settings of the Moon for women's chorus (SA), piano, marimba, and glockenspiel
- 1989 Three Pieces After Tennyson for mixed chorus or TTBB
- 2002 Proclaim this Day for Music for mixed chorus, brass, and percussion
- 2005 Let Us Find A Meadow
