= String Quartet No. 3 (Husa) =

The String Quartet No. 3 is a composition for string quartet by the composer Karel Husa. It was first performed on October 14, 1968, at the Goodman Theatre, Chicago, by the Fine Arts Quartet, to whose members the work is dedicated. The piece won the 1969 Pulitzer Prize for Music.

== Composition ==
The String Quartet No. 3 was composed in Ithaca, New York, from late 1967 to March 1968. It has a duration of roughly 19 minutes and is cast in four movements. In the score program note, Husa wrote, "In my previous quartets – one of them, No. 2, performed quite extensively by the Fine Arts Quartet – I did not preoccupy myself as much with new sonorities as in the new Quartet no. 3. Also, the form of the movements in the former two was rather traditional. The new composition explores some solo predominance, spotlighting the several instruments in rather free forms: the viola in the first movement; violoncello in the second; the two violins in the third." He added, "After Bartok, Berg, and Webern, it is not easy to imagine new ways of playing on string instruments. I feel that I have been able to find some unusual paths for bow and finger. As for the rest, I have used all the possibilities hitherto available. The forms of the four movements are few, based mostly on contrasting colors and inner tension."

== Pulitzer Prize ==
The work won Husa the 1969 Pulitzer Prize for Music. The award brought international attention to Czech-born composer, who favorably recalled, "You have the confidence that what you are doing is somehow rewarded. That's a terrific feeling, of course. It gives you an incredible lift, and keeps you in a mood so that you can compose more."
