= Naomi Akimoto =

Japanese actress and singer

- 秋本 奈緒美
- Born: Yumi Hirasawa; 13 January 1963 (age 63); Matsumoto, Nagano Prefecture, Japan
- Other name: Yumi Harada (原田 優美)
- Occupations: Actress, singer
- Years active: 1982–present
- Agent: Staff-up Group
- Spouses: Daisuke Hinata (m. 1986–1990); Atsushi Harada (m. 2003)
- Website: Naomi Akimoto

Naomi Akimoto (秋本 奈緒美, Akimoto Naomi; born January 13, 1963 in Matsumoto, Nagano Prefecture) is a Japanese actress and singer, who has been active since 1982. She is represented by Staff-up Group. Her real name is Yumi Hirasawa (平沢 優美, Hirasawa Yumi), but she is also known as Yumi Harada (原田 優美, Harada Yumi) after her marriage with actor Atsushi Harada in 2003.

== Filmography ==
=== Film ===
| Year | Title | Role | Notes | Ref. |
|---|---|---|---|---|
| 1988 | The Monster Bus | Reiko | | |
| 2025 | How to Forget You | Saori | | |

=== Television ===
| Year | Title | Role | Notes | Ref. |
|---|---|---|---|---|
| 1996 | Furuhata Ninzaburō | Hinako Mukai | Episode 14 | |
| 1997 | Mōri Motonari | Kō | Taiga drama | |
| 2015 | Minami-kun no Koibito: My Little Lover | Ritsuko Horikiri | | |

=== Stage ===
| Year | Title | Role | Notes | Ref. |
|---|---|---|---|---|
| 2019 | Black Bird | Yōko | | |

== Discography ==
=== Albums ===
- ROLLING 80'S (1982)
- ONE NIGHT STAND (1982)
- THE 20th ANNIVERSARY (1982)
- 4 SEASON (1983)
- POISON 21 (1984)
- ACT 13 (1984)
- Suisaiga (1984)
- Portrait(1986)
- Split Finger First Lady (1987)
- Golden☆Best (2015)

=== Singles ===
- Silent Communication (1982)
- BEGINNING (1983)
- Jentoru ja i rarenai (1984)
