= Marching Jayhawks =

University of Kansas marching band

- School: University of Kansas
- Location: Lawrence, Kansas
- Conference: Big 12
- Founded: 1887
- Director: Sharon Toulouse
- Assistant Director: Melissa Sawyer
- Members: 350 (2026)
- Practice field: Riedel Family Field
- Website: Website

The Marching Jayhawks is a 350-piece marching band consisting of woodwinds, brass, percussion, and color guard, representing the University of Kansas in Lawrence, Kansas. The band performs at all home football games and occasionally travels to away games. They also send smaller ensembles to pep rallies around the Kansas City area. The band marches in parades on campus and in downtown Lawrence. The volleyball and basketball pep bands play at all home games and will often travel for post-season play.

== History ==
In 1887, Stuart O. Henry put together a small, 12-member brass ensemble at the University of Kansas. The band, however, didn't really take off until the early 20th century when, in 1906, the band obtained uniforms, and in 1907 got a director, Joseph C. McCanles, who was a member of the faculty. In 1972, women became a regular part of the band. In 1989, the John Philip Sousa Foundation awarded the prestigious Sudler Trophy to the University of Kansas Band. In 1994, Sports Illustrated named the Jayhawk band as one of the top ten college marching bands.

== Directors of Bands ==
- 1907–1933: Joseph C. McCanles
- 1933–1968: Russell L. Wiley
- 1968–1970: Kenneth Bloomquist
- 1970–1971: George Boberg (interim)
- 1971–2002: Robert E. Foster
- 2002–2007: John P. Lynch
- 2007–2010: Scott Weiss
- 2010–2024: Paul W. Popiel
- 2024–present: Matt Smith

== Directors of Athletic Bands ==
- 2003–2006: James Hudson
- 2007–2011: David Clemmer
- 2011–2024: Matthew O. Smith
- 2024–present: Sharon Toulouse

== Pre-game and other shows ==
At home football games, the Marching Jayhawks perform both an opening pregame show and a halftime show that changes throughout the season. The pregame program begins with the members of the band sprinting down the stairs of the northern bowl of Memorial Stadium. The band runs onto the field to a cadence by the drum line. One of KU's fight songs, "Fighting Jayhawk," is then performed. The band is then joined by a group of the Rock Chalk Dancers, KU's dance team, for the historic "Sunflower Song" and accompanying sunflower-inspired drill. This is followed by a performance of "Stand Up and Cheer" before immediately transitioning in to "Kansas Song" as the Marching Jayhawks perform their historic KU counter march. The band then performs the National Anthem, “Crimson and the Blue” (the KU alma mater), and the Rock Chalk Chant. The Marching Jayhawks conclude with the university's official fight song, "I'm a Jayhawk." Many of the elements and formations of the pregame have been present for decades.

Halftime shows differ from game to game. Most halftime shows often include popular music or commemorate events such as September 11 or Veteran's Day. The formations for these shows are more free-form than the regimented pregame show. They are also shorter, consisting of three songs or medleys, often featuring new hits from the previous year or well-known pop tunes.
