= University of Arkansas Razorback Marching Band =

College marching band in Fayetteville, Arkansas

Razorback Marching Band
- School: University of Arkansas
- Location: Fayetteville, Arkansas, United States
- Conference: SEC
- Founded: 1874
- Director: Chase Jones
- Members: 400
- Fight song: "Arkansas, Fight!"
- Website: http://bands.uark.edu/

The Razorback Marching Band (nicknamed the "Best in Sight and Sound") is the marching band of the University of Arkansas in Fayetteville, Arkansas. The 400 member RMB performs at all home football games (in Fayetteville, Little Rock, & Dallas) as well as all post-season play (SEC Championship and/or Bowl Game). A small pep band travels to football games played elsewhere.

== History ==
In 1874, The University of Arkansas Razorback Marching band was originally formed as the Cadet Corps Band. It was formed as a part of the Military Art Department in the University of Arkansas's fourth year of operation which makes it one of the oldest collegiate bands in the United States. The Cadet Corps Band served in many functions of the campus life, not keeping exclusively to military events, but also played in football games, pageants, and commencement exercises.

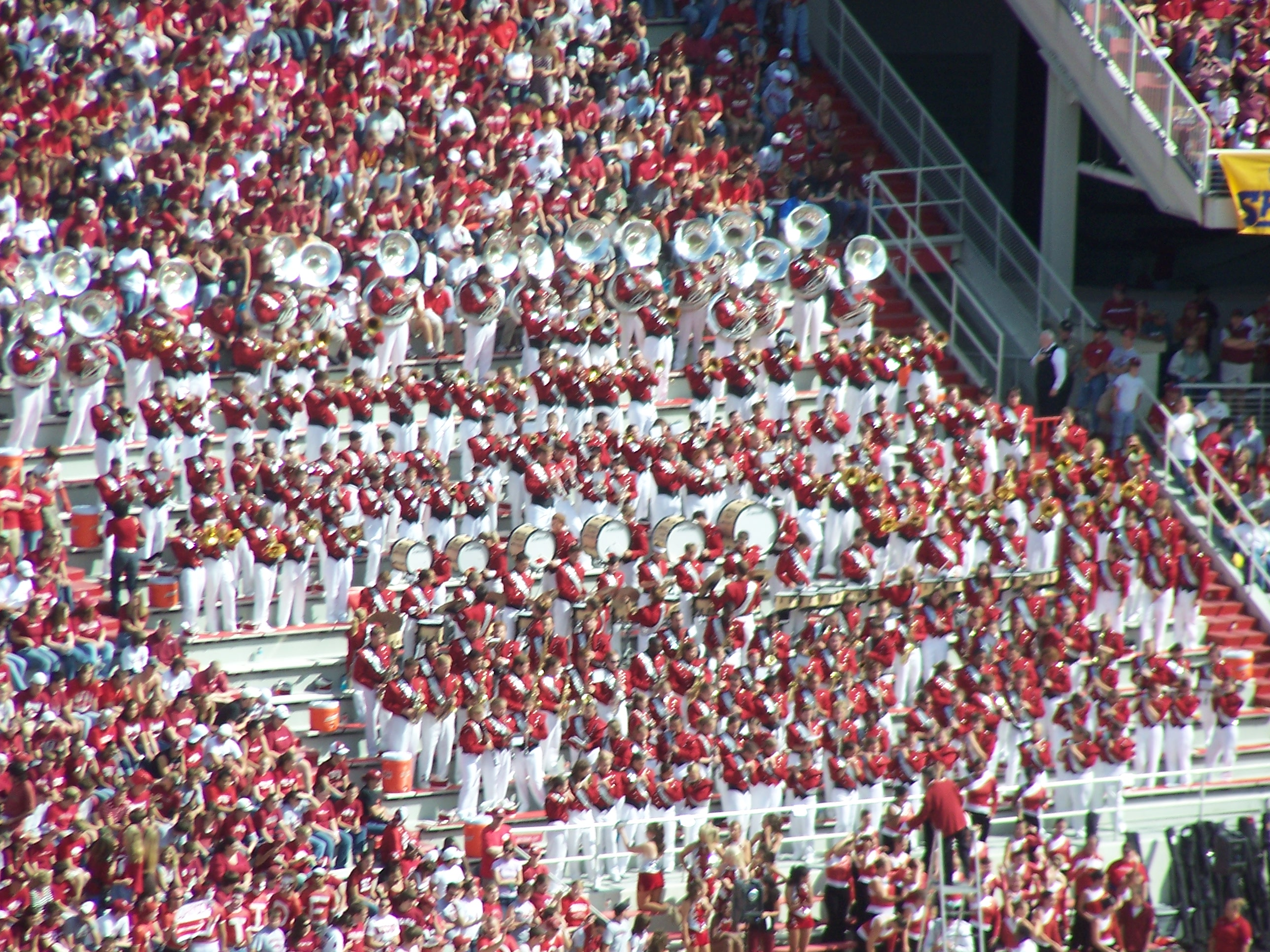
Arkansas Razorback Marching Band in Razorback Stadium for the 2006 game with Alabama.

On June 5, 1924, the Lambda chapter of Kappa Kappa Psi honorary band fraternity, was formed at the University of Arkansas. The fraternity's purpose was, and is to this day, to promote the existence and welfare of the University Band. In the time period directly following World War II, the Arkansas band enjoyed a time period of what could be considered steady growth.

In 1947 the band divided into three bands: an American football band, a concert band, and an R.O.T.C. band.

In 1948, E.J. Marty became the Director of Bands and turned the 42 piece football band into the famous "Marching 100", known throughout America as one of the best bands in the nation.

On November 11, 1950, the Psi chapter of Tau Beta Sigma honorary band sorority, was founded at the University of Arkansas. Together with the Lambda chapter of Kappa Kappa Psi, they have aided in transforming the musical organization at Arkansas.

In 1956, Dr. Richard A. "Doc" Worthington became Director of Bands during a slump in band enrollment. Dr. Worthington was quickly able to turn the "Hopeful 78" into the University of Arkansas Razorback Marching Band.

In 1995, Professor Eldon Janzen, Director of Bands and Lambda Chapter Sponsor, retired after leading the band after almost three decades. The University of Arkansas awarded him with the title "Director of Bands, Emeritus", the first such title to be given to any band director at the University of Arkansas.

In 2006, the Razorback Marching Band was awarded with the John Philip Sousa Foundation's Sudler Trophy. The purpose of the Sudler Trophy is to identify and recognize collegiate marching bands of particular excellence who have made outstanding contributions to the American way of life. The Sudler Trophy is awarded annually to a college or university marching band which has demonstrated the highest musical standards and innovative marching routines and ideas, and which has made important contributions to the advancement of the performance standards of college marching bands over a period of years.

In 2009, Timothy Gunter, stepped down as Head Director of the Razorback Marching Band, after 14 years as a director of the Athletic Bands.

In 2012, Dr. Christopher Knighten was promoted from Director of Athletic Bands to Director of Bands.

In 2014, Dr. Benjamin Lorenzo was promoted to Director of the Razorback Marching Band.

In 2022, Dr. Jeffrey Summers was promoted to Director of the Razorback Marching Band.

In 2024, Chase Jones was promoted to Director of the Razorback Marching Band. The same year, the band celebrated its 150th anniversary.

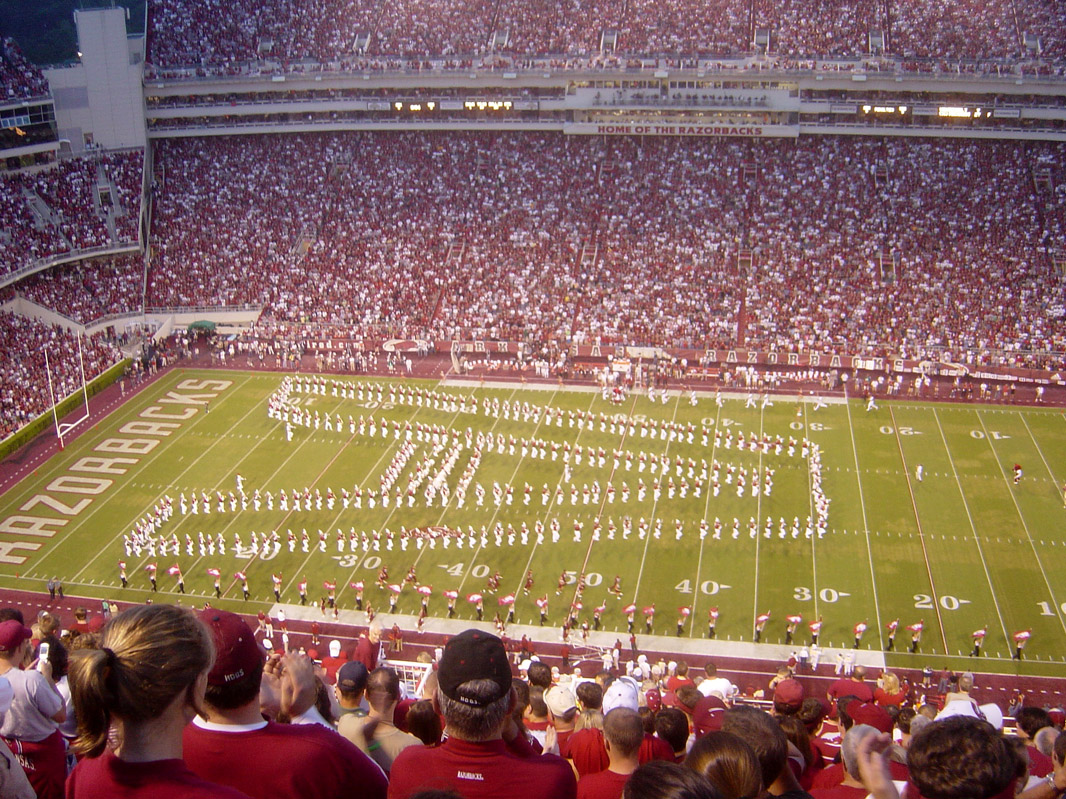
The Razorback Marching Band in formation at Razorback Stadium.

== Leadership ==
=== Staff ===
Chase Jones is the Associate Director of Bands at the University of Arkansas. In 2024, Jones was named Director of Athletic Bands and Director of the Razorback Marching Band. In 2022, Jones was made Director of the Hogwild Pep Band, the school's smaller pep band that attends sporting events other than football, such as basketball, volleyball and baseball.

Chris Agwu was brought on as the Assistant Director of the Razorback Marching Band for the 2024 season.

W. Dale Warren has been the senior Wind band director and the professor of music at the University of Arkansas.

=== Student Leadership ===
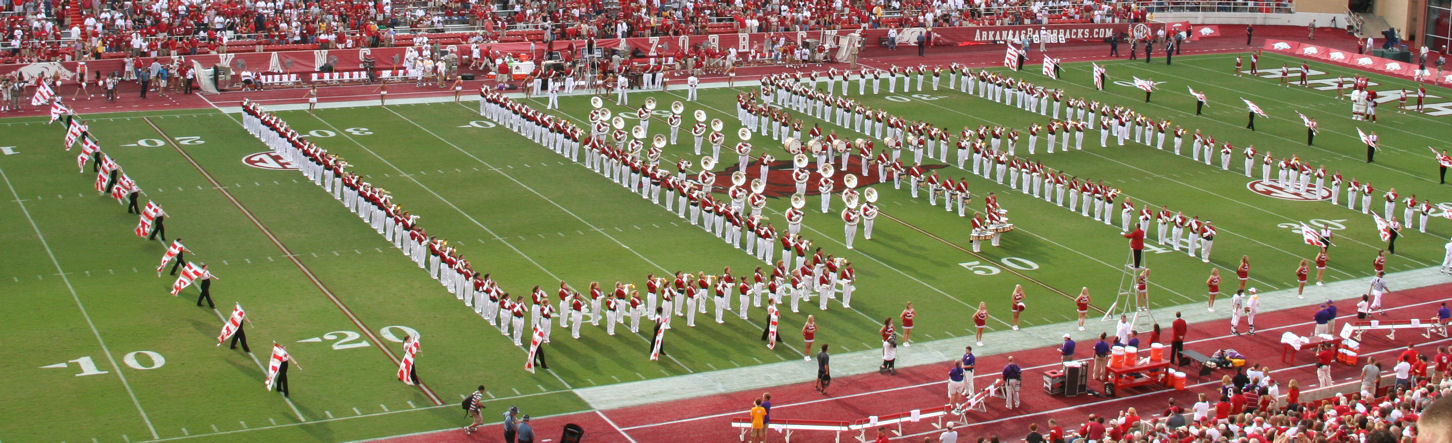
Marching Band in U of A formation

The University of Arkansas Marching Band has several student leadership positions, the most visible of which are the drum majors who lead the band on the field and direct the band in the stands.

Each section has designated Section Leaders, with numbers varying depending on the size of the section. They oversee their section during sectional rehearsals, which could cover music or marching technique. During trips and other events, the drum majors often rely on the section leaders to help organize the band before parades and other performances. Section leaders are also responsible for administrative tasks for their sections such as ensuring attendance at events and seeing that all necessary forms are filled out by their section members.

The auxiliary sections, the Razorback Color Guard and the Razorback Twirlers, also have student leadership positions, Section Leaders and Captains respectively. Along with the administrative duties of the wind and percussion Section Leaders, these Student Leaders work closely with their respective coordinators.

The band usually has one or more students functioning as Librarians. They are responsible for ensuring that music, drill sheets, etc. are printed and ready for rehearsals, in addition to managing the band library. Other student leadership positions are offered through participation in the band service organizations.
