= Concerto for Wind Ensemble (Husa) =

Composition by Karel Husa

The Concerto for Wind Ensemble is a concerto for wind ensemble by the Czech-born American composer Karel Husa. It was written for the Michigan State University Wind Ensemble in 1982 and won the first Sudler International Composition Prize in 1983.

== Reception ==
Classical Music: The Listener's Companion compared the work favorably to Béla Bartók's Concerto for Orchestra and praised the work for "...show[ing] a lightness of texture that allows the exposure of everyone's talents." Author Frank L. Battisti also lauded the work, saying:

The Concerto for Wind Ensemble is one of Husa's most brilliant pieces. The two outside movements are energetic and powerful, while the inner movement is intense and expressive. The piece displays the virtuoso capabilities of solo woodwind, brass and percussion instruments, as well as instrumental groupings, within the wind ensemble.
