= The Marching Southerners =

Marching band of Jacksonville State University in Alabama

Marching Southerners
- School: Jacksonville State University
- Location: Jacksonville, Alabama
- Conference: C-USA
- Founded: 1956
- Director: Dr. Jeremy Stovall
- Associate Director: Mr. Clint Gillespie
- Assistant Director: Mr. Chris Benedetti
- Members: 536 (2026)
- Practice field: Bennett Field
- Website: http://www.marchingsoutherners.org/

The Marching Southerners is the marching band of Jacksonville State University in Alabama. Composed of students from all over the country, the Southerners and Marching Ballerinas perform for thousands each season.

== History ==
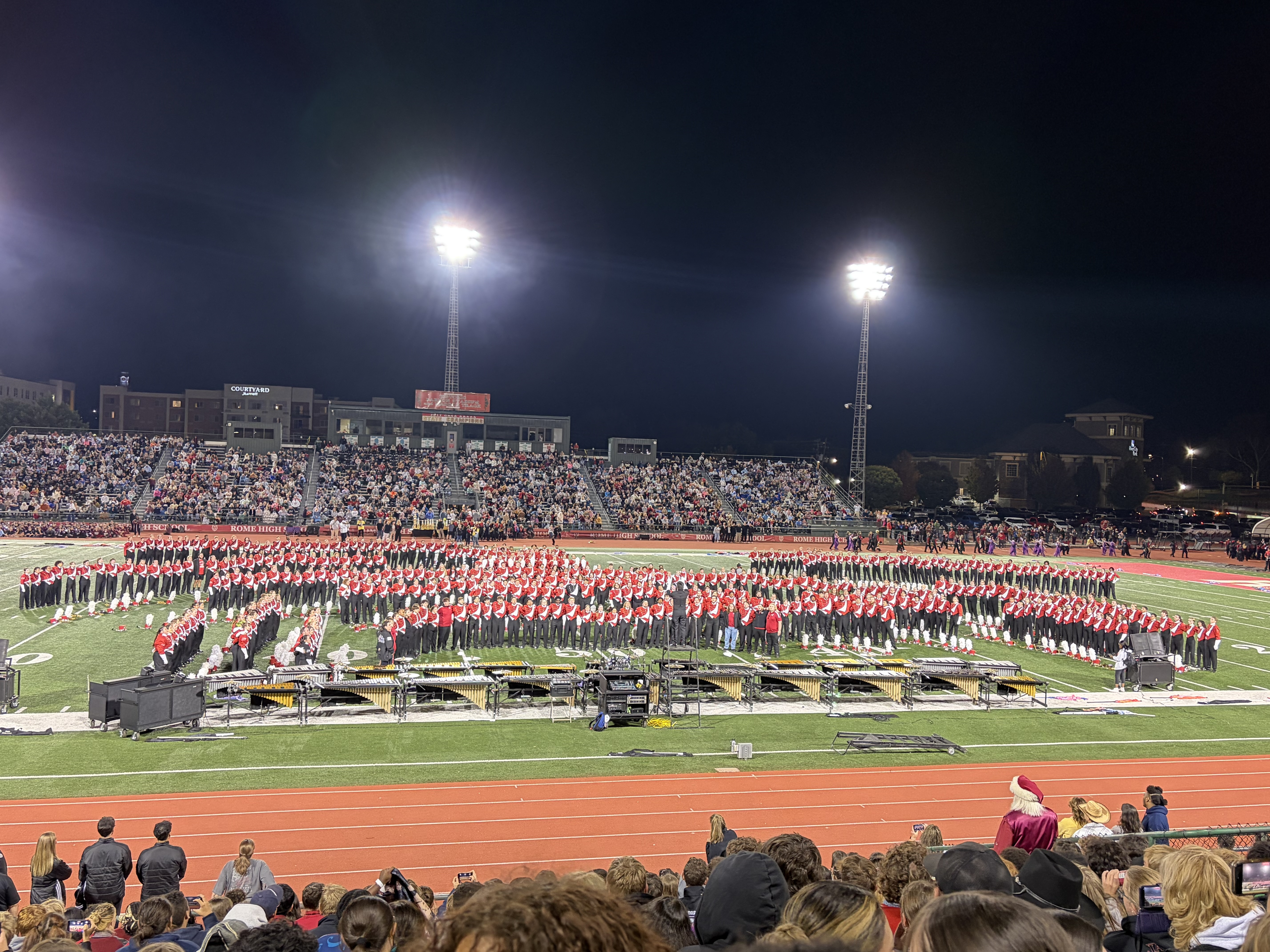
The Marching Southerners singing "I'll Fly Away" in 2025

The first band at Jacksonville State Normal School was formed in 1923–24. At that time, students only attended the school for two years and there was no full-time director, which hindered growth of the band in the early years. In 1930, the college was renamed Jacksonville State Teachers College, reflecting an increased role in higher education for the institution. The Great Depression and World War II put development of the band on hold.

After the war, Walter A. Mason became head of the music department at the college. A veteran, he turned to fellow Army musician J. Eugene Duncan who he asked to become the band's first full-time director in 1948.

The Marching Southerners were the 2021 recipients of the Sudler Trophy, the highest award for collegiate marching band.

== Music and marching Style ==
John T. Finley took over the director position in 1951 and immediately made changes to the band's musical and visual style. Finley removed the sousaphones, cornets and small-bore trombones, and replaced them with trumpets and bass trombones: instruments more usually associated with orchestras. The most radical instrumental change was the adoption of the C.G. Conn 20-J upright recording bass as the band's lead tuba, and Jacksonville State remains the only university marching band to use this heavy concert tuba on the field. Other musical changes included a departure from military-style marches in favor of slower, more dynamic, orchestral and symphonic, Broadway and Latin jazz pieces.

Visually, the band abandoned military-style block drill in favor of precision marching and wide-open company front formations: designed to achieve uniformity in step height and body carriage, whilst the company front formation helped to project the sound of the band. Finley also adopted a dance line as a visual focus instead of the majorette lines seen in more traditional marching bands, christening them the Marching Ballerinas in 1956.

Primary music arrangers for the Southerners include David L. Walters (1960s-early 1990s), Mark Fifer (1995–2004), and Justin Williams (2005–present), as well as percussion program head Clint Gillespie (1998–present).

== The name "Southerners" ==
In 1956 the band began attracting more attention and received its name, the "Southerners", in 1958.

Incidentally, Norman L. Padgett is credited with naming the band. The band's charter president, Harold Summerville, class of '60, of Bowden, Ga., recalls, "On April 21, 1958, I presented a letter of appreciation to Norman L. Padgett. It was signed by Dr. Finley and [me] at the beginning of band rehearsal that day thanking [Mr. Padgett] for his submission of the name The Southerners."

Despite the commonly used name ("The Marching Southerners"), according to the JSU Manual of Style and Usage, Point 7, the official name of the band at Jacksonville State is simply "The Southerners": the "Marching" title only being applied to the Marching Ballerinas.

== Directors ==
- 1948 J. Eugene Duncan
- 1951 John T. Finley
- 1959 John Knox (interim director)
- 1961 David L. Walters
- 1991 M. Scott McBride
- 1994 Kenneth G. Bodiford
- 2026 Jeremy Stovall

== Notable performances ==
1965 – Inaugural parade for U.S. President Lyndon Johnson

1976 – National Bicentennial Celebration Parade in Philadelphia, PA

1996 – 70th Annual Macy's Thanksgiving Day Parade in New York City. A segment of the Southerners' performance can be seen in the opening scene of Episode 9.08 of Friends ("The One with Rachel's Other Sister"), which originally aired on Nov. 21, 2002.

1998 – First performance at the Atlanta Bands of America Regional at the Georgia Dome

1999 – B.O.A. Grand Nationals at the RCA Dome in Indianapolis

2002 – B.O.A. Grand Nationals at the RCA Dome in Indianapolis

2006 – The Marching Southerners celebrated their 50th anniversary with a performance that included 1,500 former Southerners alumni, during halftime of Jacksonville State University's college football game against Samford University.

2012 – The Southerners led the New Year's Day Parade in London, England, which also kicked off the 2012 Summer Olympics celebrations and Queen Elizabeth II's Diamond Jubilee.

2016 – The Southerners played on the U.S.S Missouri in honor of the 75th anniversary of Pearl Harbor.

2018 - The Southerners performed in the World Peace Parade in Rome, Italy.

2024 - The Southerners performed in numerous performances throughout Normandy, France for the 80th D-Day Commemoration.

2025 (performing in 2026/2027) - The Southerners invited to perform in the 138th Rose Parade Presented by Honda in Pasadena, California, on January 1, 2027.

Additionally, the Southerners have regularly performed at the Bands of America contest in Atlanta, and hosted a Bands of America contest in Jacksonville, Alabama. More recently, The Southerners have hosted the Alabama Marching Band Championships on the campus of Jax State.

== Related competitive units ==
There are no organized competitions for college marching bands in the Southeast, so the Marching Southerners do not engage in direct competition with other college bands. However, Jacksonville State University sponsors several competitive marching and pageantry units that draw their membership in whole, or in part, from the marching band:

- JSU Center Stage winter guard, a member of Winter Guard International and the Southeastern Color Guard Circuit competing in the Independent Open class.
- JSU Diamond Girls, a dance team that competes throughout the Southeast.
- Formerly ran an indoor drumline that regularly competed in the marching percussion competition at Percussive Arts Society's annual convention (PASIC), which they won in 1999.
