= Music for Prague 1968 =

1968 music composition by Karel Husa

Music for Prague 1968 is a programmatic work written by Czech-born composer Karel Husa for symphonic band and later transcribed for full orchestra, written shortly after the Soviet Union crushed the Prague Spring reform movement in Czechoslovakia in 1968. Karel Husa was sitting on the dock at his cottage in America at the time, listening to the BBC broadcast of the events on the radio. He was deeply moved, and wrote Music for Prague 1968 to memorialize the events. This piece is a standard among wind ensemble repertoire.

The work was commissioned by Ithaca College and was premiered in January 1969 in Washington, DC at the Music Educators National Conference by Dr. Kenneth Snapp and the Ithaca College Concert Band.

== Instrumentation ==
The work is scored for 2 piccolos (doubling flutes), 6 flutes, 2 oboes, English horn, 2 bassoons, contrabassoon, E♭ clarinet, 9 B♭ clarinets, alto clarinet, bass clarinet, contrabass clarinet (optional but highly recommended), 2 alto saxophones, tenor saxophone, baritone saxophone, bass saxophone (doubling the contrabass clarinet part), 8 trumpets, 4 horns, 3 trombones, 2 baritone horns, 2 tubas, string bass and 5 percussion (chimes, marimba, vibraphone, xylophone, timpani, 3 antique cymbals, 3 triangles, 3 suspended cymbals, 3 tam-tams, 2-3 snare drums, 3 tom-toms, and bass drum.) Although they are not in the original score, some performances may add the parts for harp and piano from Husa's orchestral transcription.

== Structure ==
The piece is in four movements:

1. Introduction and Fanfare
2. Aria
3. Interlude
4. Toccata and Chorale

As a piece of program music, the work is bound together by symbolism and allusions. A theme from the 15th Century Hussite song "Ye Warriors of God and his Law" is laced into the music, one symbolic of resistance and hope - the theme is common enough that any Czech would know the melody and its significance. [The same theme appears (with the same significance) in Smetana's "Má Vlast" cycle, in both the Blaník and Tabor movements, as well as in Josef Suk's symphonic Poem Praga.] The sound of bells are heard throughout the music, as Prague is also known as "City of a Hundred Spires". The trombones imitate air raid sirens, and the oboes play sections of Morse code. The piccolo solo represents the bird calls, the symbol of freedom, which the composer himself wrote, 'the city of Prague has seen only for moments during its thousand years of existence'. The third movement, Interlude, is not only played solely by the percussion section, but is also a palindrome, starting and ending with a snare roll.
