= Alice Streatch =

Alice Mills Palmer Streatch (January 3, 1909 - December 2, 1999) was an American composer who wrote both the words and the music for most of her songs.

Streatch was born in Rhode Island to Edith Markland Mills and Burrows Spalding Palmer. She married Harold Siteman Streatch in 1928 and they had twin daughters, Roberta and Alberta. Streatch lived in Rhode Island for most of her life, dying there in 1999. Little is known about her education. Her music was published by Boosey & Hawkes. Her compositions, all for voice, include:

- Autumn Night (women’s chorus and piano; music by Ron Nelson; text by Alice Streatch)
- “Charley is My Boy Friend”
- “Fare Thee Well”
- “How Old is Too Old for Love?”
- “I Call You April”
- “Prayer of Thanksgiving”
- “Roses and Lilacs and Plums”
- “Say You Love Me”
- “Try a Smile”
