= Rocky Point Holiday =

Rocky Point Holiday is a composition for wind ensemble by Ron Nelson. It was written in 1966 on a summer vacation in Rocky Point, Rhode Island as a commissioned piece for the University of Minnesota band Russian tour. The piece was premiered by the University of Minnesota Concert Band and Dr. Frank Bencriscutto, conductor, at the 14th CBDNA National Conference at University of Michigan, Ann Arbor, Michigan in February 1967 and published by Boosey & Hawkes in 1969. The piece was further popularized by the Garfield Cadets as part of their 1983 Drum Corps International championship-winning program.
