= Nueces Canyon Consolidated Independent School District =

School district in Texas

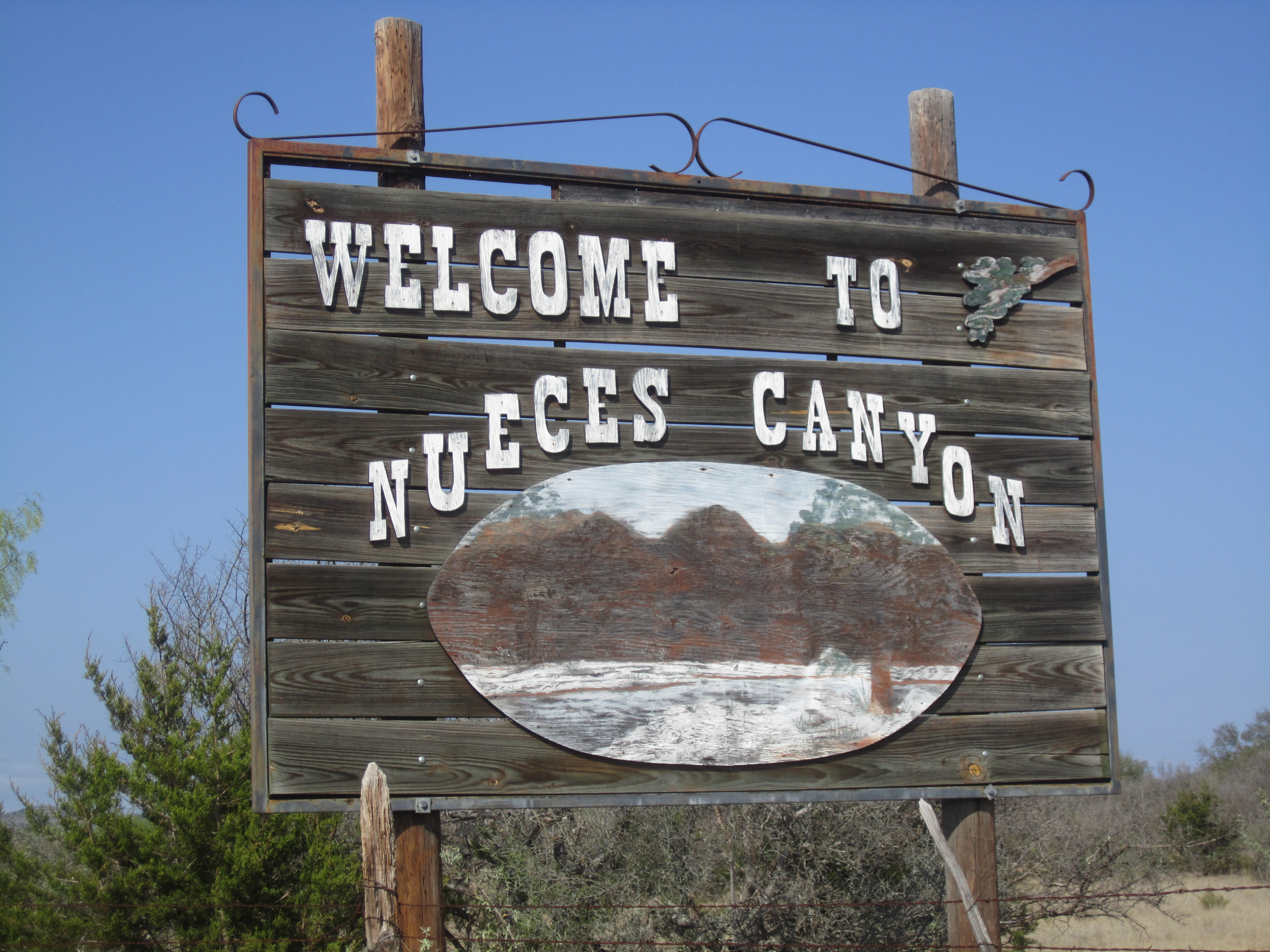
Nueces Canyon sign off scenic Texas State Highway 55

Nueces Canyon Consolidated Independent School District is a public school district based in Barksdale, Texas, US.

In addition to Barksdale, the district serves the city of Camp Wood and rural areas in southeastern Edwards, western Real, and northwestern Uvalde counties.

In 2009, the school district was rated "academically acceptable" by the Texas Education Agency.

== Schools ==
Nueces Canyon Consolidated ISD has two schools – one in Barksdale and one in Camp Wood.

- Nueces Canyon Junior High/High (Barksdale; Grades 7–12)
- Nueces Canyon Elementary (Camp Wood; Grades K–6)

== Band ==
Marching: The Nueces Canyon Band received fourth place at the Texas UIL State Area E Marching Competition in 2005–2006.

In 2006–2007, Nueces Canyon Received a Division 1 rating at the Region 11 Marching Contest in Hondo.

The Panther Band went back to state during the year 2007–2008 school year after receiving a Division 1 rating at Crystal City. They received a Division 1 rating at the Region 11 Marching Contest in Hondo and also a Division 1 rating at Area Marching at San Antonio East Central.

The marching band earned 2nd place at the 2015 UIL 1A State Marching Contest under Mr. Falcon, Director. In 2017, the band earned 6th place under Mr. Buhrts, Director.

Concert: Nueces Canyon has received sweepstakes 3 years in a row. In 2005, 2006, and, 2007.
