= Hikarigaoka Girls' High School =

Japanese girls high school

- 光ヶ丘女子高等学校

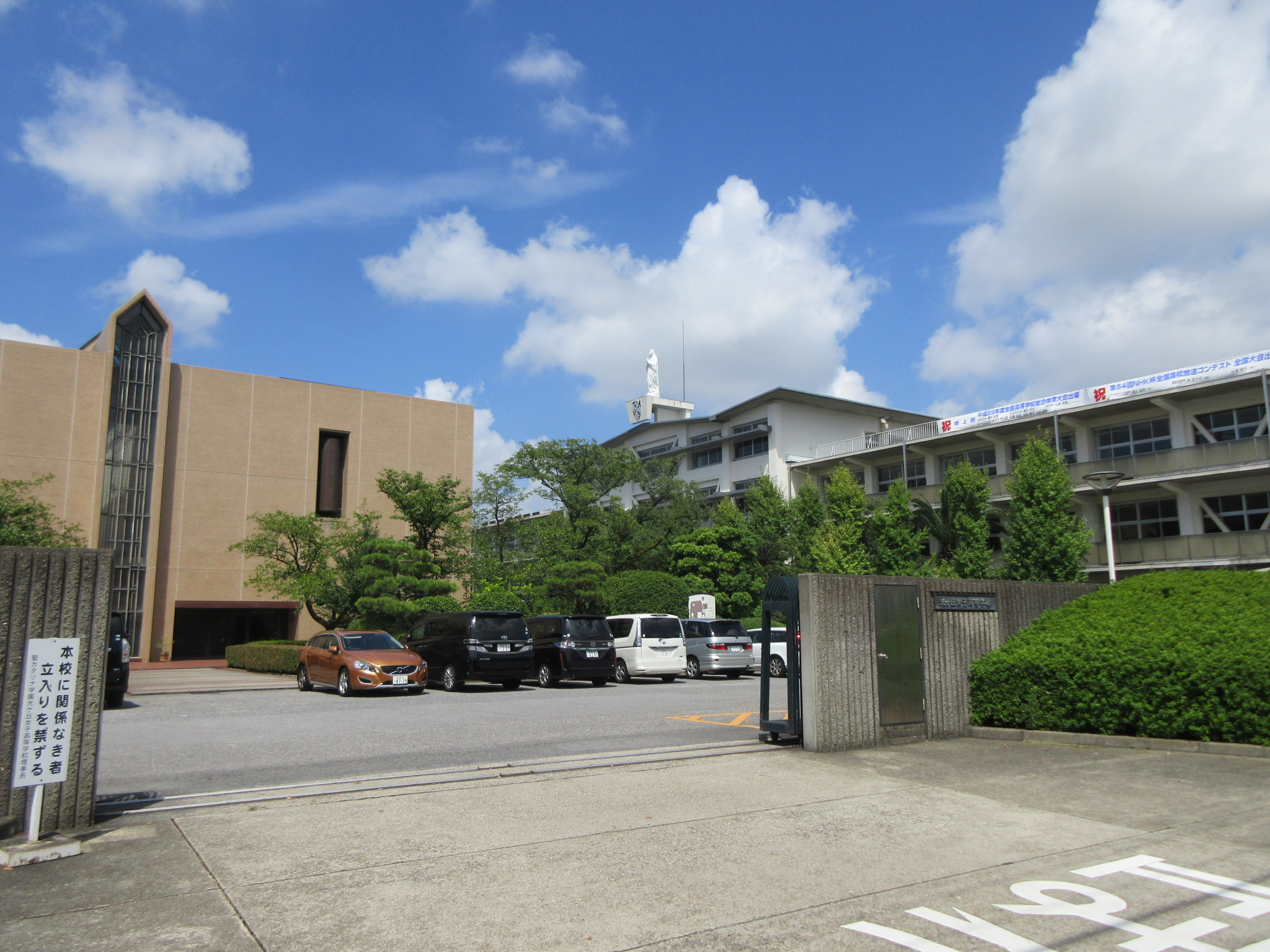
- The school in 2017

Location
- 52 Okunagairi, Ōnishi-chō; Okazaki, Aichi Prefecture, 444-0811; Japan; 34.9321°N 137.1791°E

Information
- Religious affiliation: Catholicism
- Denomination: Dominican Order
- Patron saint: Catherine of Siena
- Established: 1963; 63 years ago
- Website: https://hikarigaoka-h.ed.jp/

Hikarigaoka Girls' High School (光ヶ丘女子高等学校, Hikarigaoka Joshi Kōkōugakkō) is a high school for girls in Okazaki, Aichi, Japan.

== History ==
It was established in 1963 (Showa 38) by the Missionary Sisters of St. Dominic, adopting “Sincerity, Purity, and Service” as its school motto in emulation of St. Catherine of Siena, the school’s patron saint.

== Campus ==
It includes a dormitory built in 1969, a convent built in 1972 that has an attached chapel, and a gymnasium built in 1965.

== Awards ==
The band won the Sudler Flag of Honor in 2019, the only non-American high school band to do so.

== Gallery ==
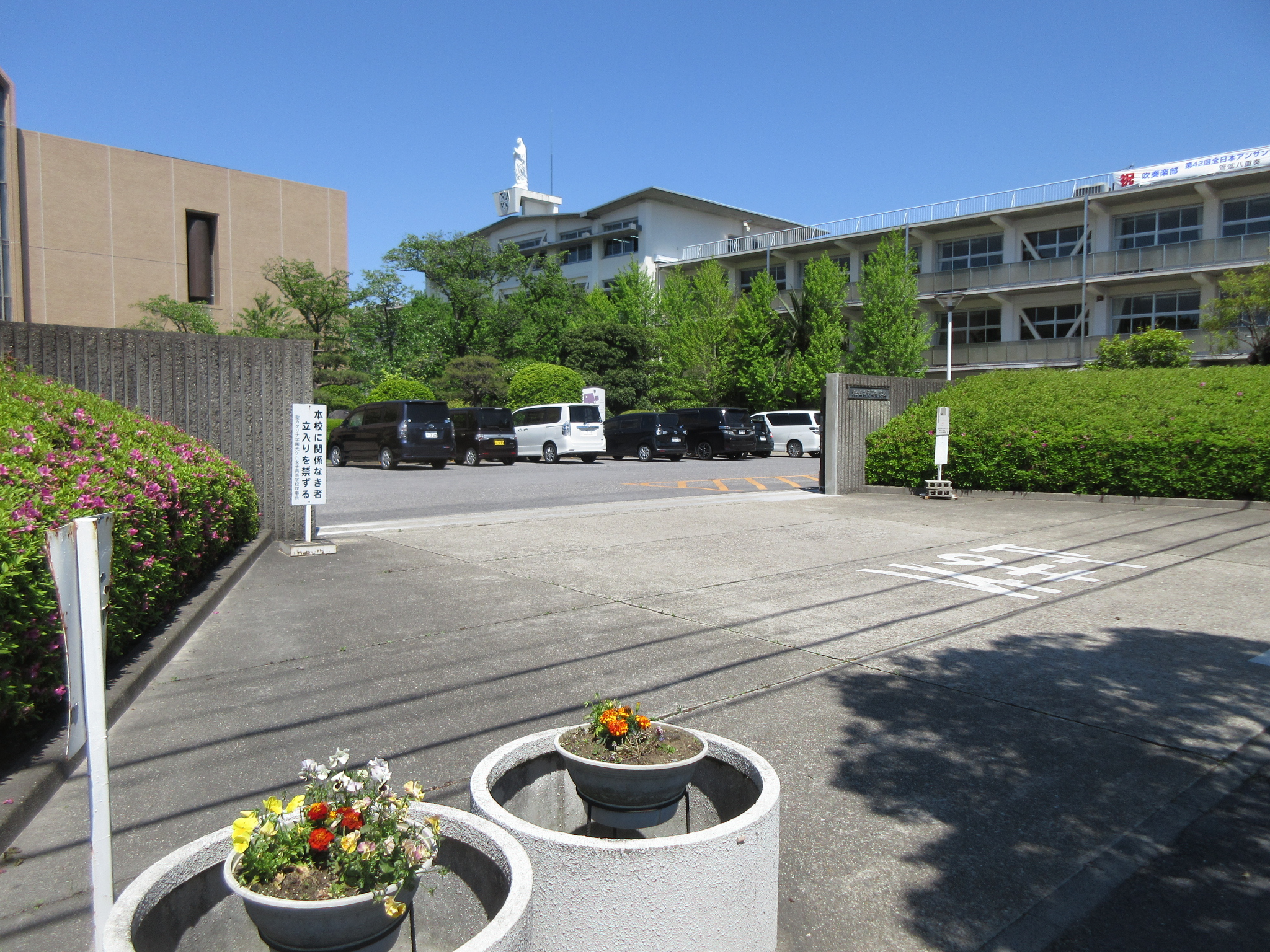
Alternative view
