= Barksdale, Texas =

Coordinates: 29°43′31″N 100°02′02″W

- Census-designated place
- Location within Texas Location within the United States
- Country: United States
- State: Texas
- County: Edwards

Population (2020)
  - Total: 91
- Time zone: UTC-6 (Central (CST))
  - Summer (DST): UTC-5 (CDT)

Barksdale is a small unincorporated community and census-designated place (CDP) in the hill country section of the U.S. state of Texas. It is located in Edwards County. It was first listed as a CDP in the 2020 census with a population of 91.

The Nueces Canyon Consolidated Independent School District serves area students.

== Demographics ==
Historical population
Census	Pop.	Note	%±
2020	91		—
U.S. Decennial Census; 1850–1900 1910; 1920 1930 1940; 1950 1960 1970; 1980 1990 2000; 2010 2020

Barksdale first appeared as a census designated place in the 2020 U.S. Census.

=== 2020 census ===
Barksdale, Texas – Racial and ethnic composition Note: the US Census treats Hispanic/Latino as an ethnic category. This table excludes Latinos from the racial categories and assigns them to a separate category. Hispanics/Latinos may be of any race.
Race / Ethnicity (NH = Non-Hispanic)	Pop 2020	% 2020
White alone (NH)	81	89.01%
Black or African American alone (NH)	0	0.00%
Native American or Alaska Native alone (NH)	0	0.00%
Asian alone (NH)	0	0.00%
Native Hawaiian or Pacific Islander alone (NH)	0	0.00%
Other race alone (NH)	0	0.00%
Mixed race or Multiracial (NH)	3	3.30%
Hispanic or Latino (any race)	7	7.69%
Total	91	100.00%
