= Aimachi =

Tenrikyo church based in Nagoya, Japan

Aimachi is a Tenrikyo church based in Nagoya, Japan. Outside Japan, Aimachi is most known for its marching music and color guard ensembles. A selection from their 130-member marching band compete internationally as an indoor percussion ensembles, indoor marching ensembles, baton twirling, and winter guards. The group rehearses at the Aikyo Church outside of Nagoya in Handa City.

== Aimachi Band ==
The Aimachi Band was started in 1962 with four members. The founder of the band, Kiyokazu Sekine, is the son of Aimachi's founder and continues to serve as the group's director. In 1998, the Aimachi marching band became the All-Japan National Champion in the All-Japan Marching and Baton Twirling championships for the first time in their history. They have gone on to win in January 1998, 2000, 2001, 2003, 2006, 2007, December 2008, 2009, 2012, 2015, 2018, and 2023, and performing in exhibition in December 2007 and 2010. They also won the 2002 WAMSB World Championship for Marching Showbands in Chiba, Japan.

Since 1990, Americans on Aimachi's instructional and design staff have included Gordon Henderson, Mitch Rogers, Michael Gaines, Jim Campbell, Tim Fairbanks, Erik Johnson, Scott Kretzer, Brett Kuhn, Jim Moore, Martin Rhees, Dean Westman, William Plenk, Christian Carichner, Stephen Mason, Aidan Ritchie and Kevin LeBoeuf.

In July 2011, the Aimachi Band traveled to Switzerland to perform at the Basel Tattoo. In May 2012, the Aimachi Band celebrated its 50th anniversary with a show performed at the Nagoya Century Hall entitled "Evolution." Other international performances have included those in Thailand, Taiwan and Shanghai.

== Indoor percussion ==
This group performs in many competitions across Japan, the Winter Guard International championships, and other exhibition performances throughout Asia. At WGI Percussion, they placed 3rd in 2000, 2006 and 2008 in the Independent World Division. A group celebrating their cultural origins, they deviate from conventional battery percussion by adding taiko drums, shime-daiko drums, and the odaiko drum to a traditionally western activity. They add many elements from their award-winning Winter Guard into their performances, including flags, rifles, sabres, batons, and dance sections to offer a visual package unique in the percussion circuit.

Percussion at WGI Independent World Class

2000 (3rd Place)

2003 “Onimusha – The Voice of the Soul” (6th Place)

2006 “Go” (3rd Place)

2008 “Drum Roll” (3rd Place)

2010 “Ice” (7th Place)

2013 “Ninja - Shadow Warrior” (6th Place)

== Winter Guard ==
Aimachi's winterguard uses conventional flags and weapons, but also adds the unique baton twirling to the performance. Their 2007 WGI bronze medal performance featured World Champion Baton Twirler Seishi Inagaki. Their history in WGI color guard competition is as follows: 1996 (18th place), 1999 (10th place), 2002 (10th place), 2004 (7th place), 2007 (tying for third in the Independent World Championships along with Blessed Sacrament) behind Fantasia and Pride of Cincinnati, 2009 (3rd place), 2012 (4th place), 2015 (4th place), and 2017 (2nd place).

Color Guard at WGI Independent World Class

1996 “KODO” (18th Place)

1999 “Candide” (10th Place)

2002 “Appalachian Morning” (10th Place)

2004 “MINUANO” (7th Place) with Seishi Inagaki

2007 “My Heart and I” (tied for 3rd Place) with Seishi Inagaki

2009 “Beloved” (3rd Place)

2012 "Hana" (4th Place)

2015 "1000 Kranes" (4th place)

2017 "May the Music Never End" (2nd place)

== Winter Guard International Winds ==
In May 2014, the Aimachi Band performed at Winter Guard International Championships in Dayton, Ohio, as a WGI Winds exhibition group. On April 17, 2016, Aimachi won the WGI Winds International World Division with a show entitled "Ascension," becoming the first group from outside of the U.S. to win any division at WGI Finals since its inception in 1977.

== History ==
Introduction

From its beginnings as a small jazz band called the Merry Young Man Band, the Aimachi Band has become one of the best-known marching bands around the world. The Band's founder was Sekine Kiyokazu, who continues in the role of director to this day.

The foundations from where the Band developed from are closely tied to the introduction of the Tenri religion to the Nagoya area by Sekine Kiyokazu's father, Sekine Toyomatsu. The elder Sekine moved to Tokoname outside of Nagoya in 1923 to visit families in the area that were interested in the Tenri religion. In 1926, he moved into Nagoya and began holding services in a small rented house. In 1930, as the church began to grow, he moved into another small house on the grounds of what is now the main Aimachi Church in Nagoya.

Sekine Kiyokazu Early Years

On January 23, 1943, Sekine Kiyokazu was born in Nagoya. Sekine was exposed to music at a very young age. His father was a strong proponent of introducing traditional Japanese music into the Tenri church services. His father also really enjoyed attending kabuki performances, and his mother's family was involved in building traditional Japanese instruments used in the performances. So music was all around the young Kiyokazu from the very beginning.

As an elementary school student, Sekine's music teacher, Mr. Watanabe, taught him singing and how to play the xylophone. Influenced by one of his friends who played marimba, Sekine later attended an after school program, taught by Suiho Yoshikawa, that specialized in teaching students to play the marimba.

In 1952, at the age of nine, Sekine entered a xylophone contest that was broadcast live on a local radio station. His third-place finish in the contest encouraged him to continue his study of music. One of the experiences that made a strong impression on Sekine was a display by the local fire department. In addition to a dazzling water demonstration by the fireman, they also had a band that performed and started to make Sekine think that he would like to lead a band someday.

Aimachi Band Beginnings

The Aimachi Band came into existence at a time following World War II that Japanese culture was greatly influenced by the presence of American military bases throughout the country. All things American, whether it be sports (baseball, which had first been introduced to Japan in 1872, had a surge of popularity following the war), movies or music, became very popular throughout Japan. American military bases all had radio stations broadcasting music such as jazz, American popular music, and band music.

Following World War II, the Tenri religion in Nagoya quickly grew in membership, and in 1955, the present day Aimachi Church was built. In addition to religious services, the Church began to offer a variety of clubs for activities such as singing, karate and other sports. In 1962, as a 19-year-old Aichi University student studying law, Sekine Kiyokatsu became the director of all of these activities for the Aimachi Church. It was at this time that Sekine formed the Merry Young Man Band, a small combo that played jazz and popular music. The name arose from one of the beliefs of the Church that being happy, or merry, is a very important aspect of a person's life.

The success of the Merry Young Man Band led Mr. Sekine to want to organize a concert band. After talking to Aimachi Church members about it, they donated enough money for Sekine to purchase 15 instruments. The only problem was that he didn't have anyone who could play these concert band instruments. About the same time, he met Mr. Nagasaka who had played in the band at Meiden High School in Nagoya, and who wished to continue playing, but he didn't have his own instrument or a group to play in. Mr. Nagasaka told Mr. Sekine that he had 14 friends who were graduates of Meiden High School that also wanted to play in a band.

As the band progressed over the next year, most of the Meiden High School alumni continued to play and Aimachi Church members started to join. By October 1963, the band purchased its first set of uniforms for the group that included 13 Meiden alumni and six Aimachi Church members as well as baton twirlers. The Meiden alumni began giving music lessons to many of the young members of the Aimachi Church as more and more church members joined the Band. The Band was soon involved in marching in local parades in addition to the concert performances.

International Influences

Genkichi Harada, who had served as a tuba player in the famed NHK Orchestra, conducted numerous clinics around Japan about band music. Sekine attended one of these clinics and the two soon became friends. As a member of the NHK Orchestra, Mr. Harada had made several world tours and knew many prominent musicians around the world whom he would often visit later on his own. Sekine accompanied Harada on one of these trips to London to visit Harry Mortimer, a famous English composer and conductor of brass bands, and Philip Jones, conductor of the internationally renowned Philip Jones Brass Ensemble. Meeting such distinguished international musicians inspired Sekine to continue to develop his skills as a teacher and conductor. Mr. Harada, who later became the executive director of the Japan Marching Band Baton Twirling Association, also helped guide Mr. Sekine during this period.

A major event that promoted the growth of band music in Japan was the World EXPO held in Osaka in 1970. One of the bands featured during that event was the Purdue University Band from Lafayette, Indiana. The performances by the Purdue Band, an in particular the Band's “Golden Girl” Selita Sue Smith, had a lasting effect on the 64 million people who attended the EXPO. Around this same time, Mr. Sekine attended a clinic in Japan held by Mr. Thomas Davis, a percussionist who was also the Director of the Marching Band at the University of Iowa from 1968 to 1972.

Sekine's first trip to the U.S. was to see a marching band contest in Enid, Oklahoma in about 1970. During this trip, he also visited the Ludwig Drum Company in Chicago. Harada encouraged Sekine to travel to the U.S. to follow Drum Corps International events, which he started to do on a regular basis.

Era of Growth

An important moment in the development of the Aimachi Band came in 1970, when the Tenrikyo Young Men's Association invited the Band to perform at an event in Tokyo at the Nippon Budokan, a famous arena that was built to host the judo competition at the 1964 Summer Olympics events but has also hosted numerous other events such as indoor marching events and rock concerts, including those by groups such as the Beatles, Pearl Jam, Ozzy Osbourne, the Doobie Brothers and Journey. For this performance, the Aimachi Band designed its first field show using Japanese popular music and traditional block formations. The success of this performance led to discussions with Mr. Harada to organize, in March 1972, a marching band association for the bands in the midsection of the country, which was part of the All Japan Marching Band Association (in 1979, the name was changed to the All Japan Marching Band and Baton Twirling Association). For the next few years, the Aimachi Band would perform in Nagoya at events hosted by this Association in a non-competitive festival format, along with other bands from the area.

Before the development of this Marching Band Association, the All Japan Band Association, which focused on concert bands, was already well established throughout the country. At that time, many of the concert bands avoided including marching activities into their programs due to a fear that it would be detrimental to the quality of the sound of their bands. Mr. Sekine introduced Mr. Harada, who was a member of the All Japan Band Association, to many of the band directors in the central part of Japan and helped to overcome these fears.

In 1973, the All Japan Marching Band and Baton Twirling Association held its first national event at the Tokyo Metropolitan Gymnasium, which had been built in 1954 for the World Wrestling Championship and was later used for gymnastic events at the 1964 Summer Olympics. The Aimachi Band appeared at this event, which at this time also used a non-competitive festival format. The Tokyo Metropolitan Gymnasium remained the site of this event until 1977, when it moved to the Nippon Budokan, where it remained for over 20 years.

In August 1974, the Band traveled to Hawaii to perform at the Tenrikyo Hawaii Convention held by the Tenrikyo Hawaii Young Men's Association. Due to the importance placed on their performance by the leaders of the Tenri Church, the Band scheduled a great deal more rehearsal time than they had for earlier events, and the playing level dramatically improved.

The divisions of the All Japan Marching Band and Baton Twirling Association included those for kindergartens, elementary schools, high schools and the open class that Aimachi participated in. The format of the event gradually evolved until the top two bands and baton corps in each division from each of three regions of the country (North, Midsection and South) met in Tokyo for an exhibition performance.

A new director of the Aimachi Band was selected by Mr. Sekine and for the next few years the Band continued along as it had before. In 1982, Mr. Sekine returned as Director and was assisted by Mr. Narita in building the quality of the Band. Sekine then started going to the U.S. on a regular basis to see drum corps competitions and meet staff from many American bands and drum corps.

Throughout the 1980s the Band remained relatively small (around 40 or 50 members). The Band continued to travel to the Final performance at the Budokan (except in 1986 when they were involved in several events at the main church in Tenri), but since it was only an exhibition performance, there was not a lot of motivation for band members to always be at rehearsal, or to push to a higher level of performance. This changed in 1990, when the Final performance became a competition. The Aimachi Band found themselves far down in the rankings, and as a result, decided to work harder to achieve the goal of winning the Final competition. Mr. Sekine became more involved in the day to day rehearsals.

Sekine also invited a number of Japanese clinicians to come work with the Band. One of these was Fukuda Makato, the Director of the Tenri High School Marching Band around this time. Fukuda brought the Tenri Band to perform at the 1990 Tournament of Roses Parade in Pasadena, California. At the same time as this trip to the U.S., the Band was preparing for their field show performance at the All Japan Marching Band and Baton Twirling Association Championship less than two weeks after their return to Japan (in 1990, this event changed its non-competitive format into a contest within each division).

Upon Fukuda's return to Japan, Sekine asked him about possible American arrangers and clinicians for the Aimachi Band and he suggested that he contact Mr. Henderson. For the 1991–92 season, Mr. Henderson arranged a show based on Beethoven's Ninth Symphony. Unfortunately, the Band was not able to perform at the Championship at the Budokan in Tokyo that year due to a problem at the finals of the regional competition. During that performance, a member of the Band made a mistake of stepping over the boundary line that resulted in a ten-point penalty (out of 100!) and caused the Band to not qualify for the Final Competition.

Drum and Bugle Corps Influences

Drum Corps International Championship videos started becoming available in Japan in the late 1970s and members of the Aimachi Band loved to watch these over and over again. Around this time, a percussionist in the Aimachi Band, Uichi Kajiyama, met a member of the Velvet Knights Drum Corps percussion section who was Japanese when the Aimachi Band performed on a TV show called “Do Marching World.” Uichi began to express an interest in traveling to the U.S. to march in one of the American drum and bugle corps as a way to learn more about the marching activity.

Many Aimachi Church members were not in favor of this, but Mr. Sekine wholeheartedly supported it, since he thought that it would be a great asset for the Aimachi Band to have someone with that training to help the Band once they returned. Although Uichi did not yet have the skills as a percussionist to perform with one of the top DCI corps, he did tour as a volunteer with the Cavaliers from Rosemont, Illinois for the 1992 season. Uichi had originally planned to tour with the Santa Clara Vanguard, but when Mr. Henderson was hired by the Cavaliers as the Head Brass Instructor, Mr. Fukuda recommended that Uichi go to Cavaliers instead. During this first year in Rosemont, Uichi met several other Cavalier staff and marching members who would later become members of Aimachi's staff, including Mitch Rogers, Jim Campbell, Michael Gaines, Michael Tarr, and Rosie Miller Queen. After his volunteer chores each day, Uichi would practice diligently and observe rehearsals and performance. Uichi marched as a member of the Cavaliers percussion section in 1993 through 1996. During this time, he was enrolled in Concordia College in Chicago studying English.

Over the next several years, more Aimachi Band members, including two of his children, Kazue and Kiyotaka, traveled to the U.S. to join various drum corps including the Cadets, Blue Devils, Carolina Crown, Santa Clara Vanguard, Troopers, Blue Stars, Phantom Regiment and several more to the Cavaliers. Most of these people returned to the Band and have served as instructors or in leadership positions in the Band such as section leader.

In 1992, after meeting Henderson during DCI Finals Week in Madison, Wisconsin, Sekine asked him to arrange a piece of music from the Tenri religion called “The Truth of the Creation.” Mr. Henderson casually mentioned to Uichi that he would like to come to Japan someday to work with the Aimachi Band. Sekine immediately responded with an invitation to come visit in January 1993, as the Band prepared for the Final Competition. The Band finished third at the Budokan competition that year, behind the Yokohama Renaissance Vanguard and the Yokohama Inspires, but Henderson was able to give Sekine many ideas about how to improve the Band's performance, including which instruments to purchase, designers and instructors to bring in and how to address problems with their practice facilities.

Henderson and Rogers, along with Bret Kuhn who had taken over percussion arranging duties from Jim Campbell in the early 2000s, remained with the Aimachi Band through the 2025 season when they announced their retirements.

Through Sekine and Uichi's connections with the Cavaliers, Michael Gaines was hired to come to Japan to work with the Color Guard for the Aimachi Band and also to prepare the Color Guard for their first performance at the Winter Guard International Championships in Dayton, Ohio in 1996. Since then, the Color Guard has returned to perform at WGI in 1999, 2002, 2004 (in San Diego), 2007 and 2009. The Color Guard finished 3rd at the last two of the trips.

Rehearsal Facilities

During the Band's early years, the primary rehearsal site for the Band was the basement of the Aimachi Church in Nagoya. As the Band began to be more involved in “field” shows, it would practice in parks at night in downtown Nagoya. Once they started to become more serious about the competition in the early 1990s, they began practicing in gymnasiums all around Nagoya. During the week, these rehearsal would usually start about 6pm, but due to most members’ school and work schedule, the full band rehearsal usually wouldn't really get going until about 8pm. Most of the facilities would close at 9pm, meaning that at 8:45pm, there would be a mad scramble to move all of the instruments and equipment out of the gymnasium and back on the Band's truck. This would be repeated night after night!

When the Band would travel to Tokyo for the Final Competition, they would practice outside, sometimes in wet, muddy (and cold) flood control areas. After it became apparent that these situations did not promote the best possible performance, they started to find gymnasiums in Tokyo on the day of the Final Competition starting in 1994.

On weekends, especially on Sundays, a place was usually found that would allow for longer rehearsals, sometimes outside. In 1995, Mr. Sekine broke ground on a new gymnasium to be built on the grounds of the Aikiyo Church in Handa. This required moving the “Dome House” (a guest house used by visiting church officials, instructors and some band members) off its foundation and over about 50 feet.

The new gym has two levels. On the first floor these is a large office, rehearsal rooms for each brass section, a large rehearsal room for the full brass section, a large battery percussion rehearsal room, and storage rooms. The soundproofing of these rooms is so effective that even with the battery and full brass rooms adjacent to each other, the sound cannot be heard between the rooms.

The second floor has a 40-meter square gym floor for band, percussion, color guard and twirler rehearsals. This mimics the size of many of the Band's performance venues that are built with a floor this size to accommodate sumo wrestling competitions. This floor also houses a small office, and a foyer that is used by the pit percussion section, along with other storage spaces. Above the gym floor is a walkway along all four sides with a small viewing area on one side, which is mainly used by instructors during rehearsals. Hanging from the ceiling is a huge banner displaying a photograph of Mr. Sekine's father, Sekine Toyomatsu. Over the years, banners and props from various shows have been hung from the ceiling and walkway. With the completion of this facility, the Band was able to rehearse more often, longer and more effectively than ever before.

The First All Japan Championship

From 1994 to 1997, the Band performed shows based on common themes such as the music from the opera Carmen, various symphonic band works, and Russian music. The Band improved its ranking to second place during this period but was unable to put together a championship show. Starting with the 1996 show, “Winds of Spain,” the Band started to perform at a much higher level. In 1997, the Aimachi Band's score tied for first place, but the Renaissance Vanguard was again named Champion due to the All Japan tiebreaking formula.

Finally, in January 1998, the Band's “Miss Saigon” show put them on top. The music was taken from the Santa Clara Vanguard's show in 1991, but the outstanding feature of the show was a nearly full scale helicopter that was assembled by members of the Church. Since the door onto the competition field at the Budokan was very small, the helicopter had to be assembled in the back of the field during the Band's show and then hoisted on a scissor lift just as it made its appearance. A member of the Band sat inside the helicopter and operated the crank that spun the huge propeller. As the helicopter appeared at the end of the show, the crowd response was overwhelming and at the very end, the entire helicopter was spun around to create a very dramatic effect. With this victory, the Band's first at the All Japan Marching Band and Baton Twirling Association Championships, Mr. Sekine was inspired to come up with more spectacular and unusual effects to introduce in future shows.

After coming in second in 1999, the Band looked for a theme for the next year's show that would take advantage of their strong drumline and decided that a show entitled “Africa” would do that, and it also opened up numerous opportunities for costuming and other effects. In 2001, Mr. Sekine decided to do a show entitled “Native American.” To do research for this show, Mr. Sekine traveled to Calgary, Alberta, Canada to visit with Mr. Robert Eklund, President of the World Association of Marching Show Bands, who took him to visit Indian tribes there and gather ideas for costuming, movements and props.

The Aimachi Band took first place with both of these shows that featured elaborate costuming and props, which led the All Japan Marching Band Baton Twirling Association to create rules that limited the size and nature of props that would be allowed in shows. However, these new rules did not stop the Aimachi Band and Mr. Sekine became even more creative with effects that he incorporated into the shows. The Aimachi Band became the first band in this division to be invited to perform in exhibition at the All Japan Championship the following year, 2002.

Two more consecutive Championships were achieved in December 2008 and 2009 with very controversial shows. In 2008, the show was entitled “Guernica” that told the story of a love affair between a German soldier and a peasant girl during the Spanish Civil War. The 2009 show, entitled “Virus,” showed a mad scientist creating a deadly disease in his laboratory with another team of “good” scientists racing to find an antidote to prevent an epidemic! Once again, the Aimachi Band was honored to perform in exhibition at the 38th Annual All Japan Championships.

For the exhibition performance at the 38th Annual, Mr. Sekine designed a show full of Japanese tradition, and he planned to take this show to Basel, Switzerland, in July 2011 to perform at the international Basel Tattoo, along with ensembles from Switzerland, England, Scotland, Germany, Australia, Ireland, and Bahrain. The Aimachi Band performed over a dozen times during the week-long event and took trips to Lucerne, Interlaken, and Strasbourg.
