= Karel Husa =

Czech conductor and composer (1921–2016)

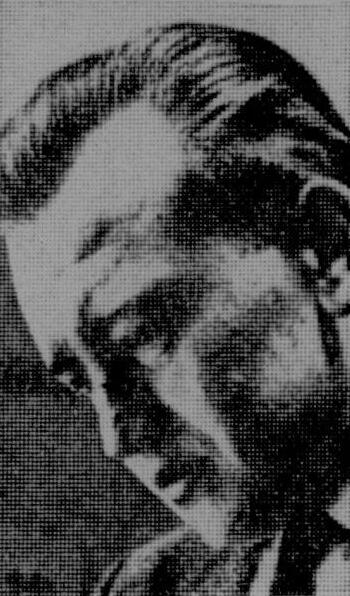
- Husa in 1969
- Born: August 7, 1921; Prague, Czechoslovakia
- Died: December 14, 2016 (aged 95); Apex, North Carolina, United States
- Occupations: Classical composer and conductor
- Spouse: Simone Perault

Karel Husa (August 7, 1921 – December 14, 2016) was a Czech-born classical composer and conductor, winner of the 1969 Pulitzer Prize for Music and 1993 University of Louisville Grawemeyer Award for Music Composition. In 1954, he emigrated to the United States and became an American citizen in 1959.

== Overview ==
Husa learned to play the violin and the piano in early childhood. After passing his final examination at high school, he enrolled in the Prague Conservatory in 1941, where he studied with Jaroslav Řídký, and attended courses in conducting led by Metod Doležil and Pavel Dědeček.

After the end of the Second World War, Husa was admitted to the graduate school of the Prague Academy, where he attended courses led by Řídký and graduated in 1947. He then continued composition and conducting studies in Paris. In 1947, he studied with Arthur Honegger and Nadia Boulanger. He studied conducting at the École Normale de Musique de Paris and at the Conservatoire de Paris. His conducting teachers included Jean Fournet, Eugène Bigot and André Cluytens. He subsequently divided his career between composing and conducting.

Husa's String Quartet No. 1 received its premiere in June 1950, and won him international attention, as well as the 1950 Lili Boulanger Award and the 1951 Bilthoven Festival Prize. Other performances in the aftermath of these prizes included the International Society for Contemporary Music in Brussels (1950), festivals in Salzburg (1950), Darmstadt (1951), and the Netherlands (1952) as well as at various concerts in Germany, France, Sweden, England, Switzerland, Australia and the United States. Other compositions written by Karel Husa during his time in Paris include Divertimento for String Orchestra, Concertino for Piano and Orchestra, Évocations de Slovaquie, Musique d'amateurs, Portrait for String Orchestra, First Symphony, First Sonata for Piano, and Second String Quartet. Throughout this period, the composer's underlying preoccupation and interest was style, which was primarily influenced by Vítězslav Novák, Leoš Janáček, Béla Bartók and Igor Stravinsky.

From 1954 until 1992, Husa was a professor at Cornell University, eventually holding the Kappa Alpha chair in music. Composers who studied with Husa include Steven Stucky, Leonard Lehrman, Christopher Rouse, John S. Hilliard, Jerry Amaldev, Christopher Kaufman, Ann Loomis Silsbee, David Conte, and Byron Adams. He was also a lecturer at Ithaca College from 1967 to 1986, and served as the first Director of the Cayuga Chamber Orchestra from 1977 to 1984. Husa composed Music for Prague 1968, a work in memory of the 1968 Soviet bloc invasion of Czechoslovakia, which became one of his most celebrated compositions. His String Quartet No. 3 won the Pulitzer Prize in 1969. Husa was the 1993 recipient of the Grawemeyer Award for Music Composition for his Concerto for Cello and Orchestra. He was a National Patron of Delta Omicron, an international professional music fraternity. In 2012, Husa received an honorary Doctor of Fine Arts degree from the University of Louisville. In his final years, Husa resided in Apex, North Carolina.

Husa and his wife Simone were married for 64 years. The couple had four daughters, Annette, Catherine, Elizabeth and Caroline. His widow and daughters survive him.

The Prague Symphony Orchestra, the most professional performer of Husa's symphonic work in his native Czech Republic, premiered or recorded a number of his compositions. Music for Prague 1968 has become a regular part of the repertoire of the Prague Symphony Orchestra.

== Compositions ==
=== Ballet ===
Date	Czech Title	English Title	Remarks
1974		The Steadfast Tin Soldier	for narrator and orchestra after the fairy tale by Hans Christian Andersen
1976		Monodrama (Portrait of an Artist)	commissioned by the Butler University Ballet
1980	Trojské ženy	The Trojan Women	commissioned by the University of Louisville

=== Orchestra ===
Date	Czech Title	English Title	Remarks
1944	Předehra pro velký orchestr	Overture for Large Orchestra	Op.3
1944	Sinfonietta pro komorní orchestr	Sinfonietta	Op.4; for chamber orchestra
1946–1947	Tři fresky pro orchestr	Trois fresques (Three Frescoes)	Op.7; for orchestra
1948	Divertimento pro smyčcový orchestr	Divertimento; 1. Overture; 2. Aria; 3. Finale	for string orchestra
1952		Musique d'amateurs, Four Easy Pieces	for oboe (clarinet or flute), trumpet, and string orchestra with percussion
1953	Portrait pro smyčce	Portrait	for string orchestra
1953	Symfonie č.1	Symphony No.1	
1955	Čtyři malé kusy pro smyčce	Four Little Pieces (Vier kleine Stücke)	for string orchestra (or soloists)
1956–1957		Fantaisies; 1. Aria; 2. Capriccio; 3. Nocturne	for orchestra
1960		Mosaïques	for orchestra
1963		Fresque	for orchestra; revision of No.1 from Trois fresques (1946–1947)
1968	Hudba pro Prahu 1968	Music for Prague 1968	original for symphonic band
1971		Two Sonnets by Michelangelo	for orchestra
1979		Pastoral for strings	commissioned by the American String Teachers Association (ASTA)
1980		Scenes from The Trojan Women	suite from the ballet
1983		Reflections (Symphony No.2)	
1984		Symphonic Suite	for orchestra
1986		Concerto for Orchestra	
1990	Předehra "Mládí"	Overture "Youth"	commissioned by Seattle Youth Symphony
1996		Celebration Fanfare	for orchestra
1997		Celebración	for orchestra

=== Band ===
Date	Czech Title	English Title	Remarks
1958	Divertimento pro žesťové a bicí nástroje	Divertimento	for brass and percussion; expansion of movements from the Eight Czech Duets
1968	Hudba pro Prahu 1968	Music for Prague 1968; 1. Introduction and Fanfare; 2. Aria; 3. Interlude; 4. Toccata and Chorale	original version for concert band; also for orchestra
1970	Apoteóza planety země	Apotheosis of This Earth; 1. Apotheosis; 2. Tragedy of Destruction; 3. Postscript	original version for concert band; also for chorus and orchestra (1972)
1973	Al Fresco pro koncertní dechový orchestr	Al Fresco	for concert band
1974; 1995	Divertimento pro dechové a bicí nástroje	Divertimento	for symphonic winds and percussion
1980	Fanfara pro žesťové a bicí nástroje	Fanfare	for brass and percussion
1980	Intrady an interludia pro sedm trubek a bicí nástroje	Intradas and Interludes for Seven Trumpets and Percussion	
1982	Koncert pro dechový ansembl	Concerto for (Large) Wind Ensemble	winner of the first Sudler International Prize, 1983
1984	Smetanovská fanfara	Smetana Fanfare	for large wind ensemble
1996		Les Couleurs fauves (Vivid Colors)	commissioned by Northwestern University
1996		Midwest Celebration	fanfare for 3 brass and percussion ensembles
2006	Gepard	Cheetah	commissioned by the University of Louisville Wind Symphony

=== Concertante ===
Date	Czech Title	English Title	Remarks
1949	Concertino pro klavír a orchestr	Concertino for Piano and Orchestra	Op.10; also for piano and wind ensemble (1984) or 2 pianos
1959	Poem pro violu a komorní orchestr	Poem	for viola and chamber orchestra (or piano)
1967	Koncert pro altsaxofon a koncertní dechový orchestr	Concerto for Alto Saxophone and Concert Band	also for alto saxophone and piano
1961	Elegie a rondo pro altosaxofon a orchestr	Elegy and Rondo (Élégie et rondeau)	for alto saxophone and orchestra (or piano)
1965		Sérénade	for woodwind quintet with string orchestra, xylophone and harp (or wind quintet and piano)
1971		Concerto for Brass Quintet and String Orchestra	
1971	Koncert pro bicí nástroje a dechový soubor	Concerto for Percussion and Wind Ensemble	
1973	Koncert pro trubku a koncertní dechový orchestr	Concerto for Trumpet and Wind Orchestra	also for trumpet and piano
1987	Koncert pro varhany a orchestr	Concerto for Organ and Orchestra	
1987	Koncert pro trubku a orchestr	Concerto for Trumpet and Symphony Orchestra	also for trumpet and piano
1988	Koncert pro violoncello a orchestr	Concerto for Cello and Orchestra	winner of the 1993 Grawemeyer Award for Music Composition
1992	Koncert pro housle a orchestr	Concerto for Violin and Orchestra	

=== Chamber ===
Date	Czech Title	English Title	Remarks
1943	Smyčcový kvartet "0"	String Quartet "0"	Op.2
1945	Suita pro violu a klavír	Suite for Viola and Piano	Op.5
1945	Sonatina pro housle a klavír	Sonatina for Violin and Piano	Op.6; also for flute and piano
1948	Smyčcový kvartet č.1	String Quartet No. 1	Op.8
1951	Slovenské evokace	Évocations de Slovaquie (Evocations of Slovakia)	for clarinet, viola and cello
1953	Smyčcový kvartet č.2	String Quartet No. 2	
1963	Serenáda pro dechový kvintet a klavír	Serenade	for wind quintet and piano
1966		Deux Préludes (Two Preludes)	for flute, clarinet and bassoon
1968	Smyčcový kvartet č.3	String Quartet No. 3	winner of the 1969 Pulitzer Prize for Music
1968	Divertimento pro žesťový kvintet	Divertimento	for brass quintet and optional percussion; expansion of movements from the Eight Czech Duets (1955)
1976		Drum Ceremony	for 5 percussionists from American Te Deum
1977	Krajinomalby pro žesťový kvintet	Landscapes for brass quintet	commissioned by Western Brass Quintet
1978	Sonáta pro housle a klavír	Sonata for Violin and Piano	
1979	Tři taneční skici pro bicí nástroje	Three Dance Sketches for Percussion	4 or more performers
1981	Sonata à tre	Sonata à tre	for violin, clarinet and piano
1982	Vzpomínky pro dechové kvinteto a klavír	Recollections	for woodwind quintet and piano
1984	Variace pro housle, violu, violoncello a klavír	Variations	for piano quartet
1984	Intrada pro žesťový kvintet	Intrada	for brass quintet
1990	Smyčcový kvartet č.4	String Quartet No.4 "Poems"	
1991		Cayuga Lake (Memories)	for string, woodwind and brass quartets, piano and percussion
1992		Tubafest Celebration	for tuba quartet
1994		Five Poems	for woodwind quintet
1997		Postcard from Home	for alto saxophone and piano
2003		"Sonatina" for flute and piano	transcription of "Sonatina" for violin and piano, Op. 6
2008		Three Studies for solo clarinet	commissioned for 60th anniversary of "Prague Spring Festival" and dedicated to Jiří Hlaváč on his 60th birthday

=== Keyboard ===
Date	Czech Title	English Title	Remarks
1943	Sonatina	Sonatina	Op.1; for piano
1952	Sonáta pro klavír č.1	Sonata No.1	Op.11; for piano
1955	Osm českých duet	Eight Czech Duets	for piano 4-hands
1957	Elegie pro klavír	Elegy	for piano
1975	Sonáta pro klavír č.2	Sonata No.2	for piano
1986	Fragmenty pro varhany	Frammenti (Fragments)	for organ solo

=== Vocal ===
Date	Czech Title	English Title	Remarks
1956	Spievanky, dvanáct písní moravských	Twelve Moravian Songs	for voice and piano
1955; 1964	Slavnostní óda pro sbor a orchestr	Festive Ode (for an Academic Occasion)	for chorus and orchestra (or band, wind ensemble or organ)
1972	Apoteóza planety země pro sbor a symfonický orchestr	Apotheosis of This Earth	for chorus and orchestra; original version for concert band (1970)
1976	"Čas od času jsou jitra..." pro smíšený sbor a cappella	There Are from Time to Time Mornings...	for baritone and mixed chorus a cappella; text from An American Te Deum by Henry David Thoreau
1976	Americké Te Deum pro baryton, smíšený sbor a orchestr	An American Te Deum	for baritone, chorus and wind ensemble; for baritone, chorus and orchestra (1977); text compiled by the composer from the writings of Henry David Thoreau, Ole Edvart Rølvaag, Otokar Březina, folk, traditional and liturgical sources
1981	Tři moravské písně pro smíšený sbor a cappella	Three Moravian Songs	for mixed chorus a cappella
1981	Každý den pro smíšený sbor a cappella	Every Day	for mixed chorus a cappella; text by Henry David Thoreau
1982		Cantata for Male Chorus and Brass Quintet	text by Edwin Arlington Robinson, Emily Dickinson, Walt Whitman
2000	Dobrou noc	Good Night	song for mixed chorus a cappella
