= UMass Minutemen football =

College football program

2026 UMass Minutemen football team
- First season: 1879; 147 years ago
- Athletic director: Ryan Bamford
- General manager: Jared Osumah
- Head coach: Joe Harasymiak; 2nd season, 3–12 (.200)
- Location: Amherst, Massachusetts
- Stadium: Warren McGuirk Alumni Stadium (capacity: 17,000)
- NCAA division: Division I FBS
- Conference: MAC
- Colors: Maroon and white
- All-time record: 583–661–50 (.470)
- Bowl record: 1–2 (.333)

NCAA Division I FCS championships
- 1998

Conference championships
- Yankee: 1960, 1963, 1964, 1966, 1967, 1969, 1971, 1972, 1974, 1977, 1978, 1979, 1981, 1982, 1986, 1988, 1990 A-10: 1998, 1999, 2003, 2006 CAA: 2007
- Consensus All-Americans: 1
- Rivalries: Boston College (rivalry); UConn (rivalry); Buffalo (rivalry)

Uniforms
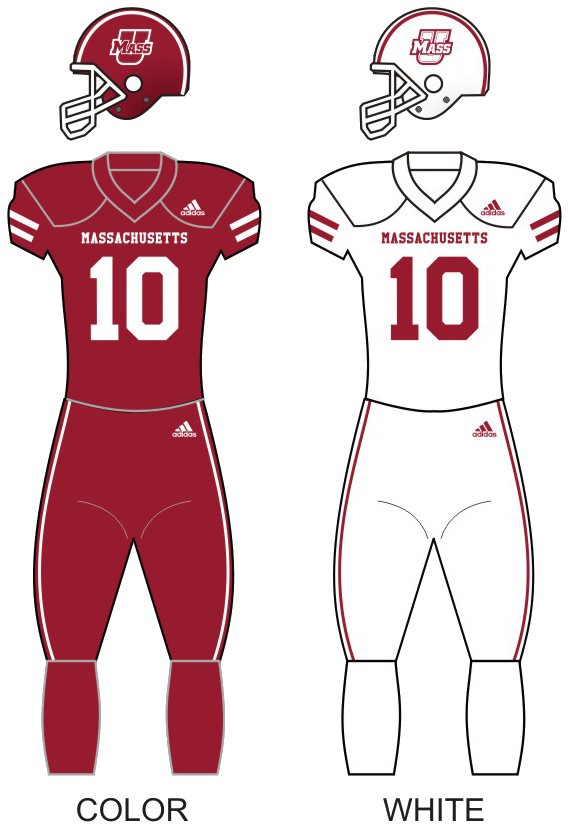
- Fight song: Fight Mass
- Mascot: Sam the Minuteman
- Marching band: The Power and Class of New England
- Outfitter: Adidas
- Website: UMassAthletics.com

The UMass Minutemen football team represents the University of Massachusetts Amherst in the NCAA Division I Football Bowl Subdivision (FBS). The Minutemen compete as a member of the Mid-American Conference (MAC). Since 1965, their home games have been played at Warren McGuirk Alumni Stadium on the university's campus in Amherst, Massachusetts.

UMass began play in 1879 and have since appeared in three FCS National Championship games, winning the title in 1998. The Minutemen began a two-year Football Bowl Subdivision transition period in 2011, becoming bowl eligible in 2013. UMass began its FBS tenure as an associate member of the Mid-American Conference (MAC) but left the conference after the 2015 season rather than become a full member. Afterwards, the Minutemen competed as an independent, however in February 2024 the UMass athletics department announced that they would rejoin the MAC as a full member, effective July 1, 2025.

UMass named Joe Harasymiak as their next head football coach on December 4, 2024.

== History ==
=== Early history (1879–1977) ===
UMass began playing football on November 22, 1879, when the school was known as Massachusetts Agricultural College, and the team was known as the "Aggies." They were first organized the previous fall by Francis Codman, but did not play their first game until November 22, 1879, defeating the Amherst College freshman team 4–0. As this was their only game that year, 1879 is noted as their first undefeated season, matched only by the 1889 season (2–0) and the 1963 season (8–0–1). Massachusetts later teamed up with Storrs Agricultural College (now the University of Connecticut) and Rhode Island College of Agriculture and Mechanic Arts (now the University of Rhode Island) to form the Athletic League of New England State Colleges for the purpose of scheduling football matchups between the schools. The first meeting between the Aggies and each of the other schools resulted in a shutout win for Massachusetts, as they defeated Connecticut, 36–0, in 1897 and Rhode Island, 46–0, in 1903.

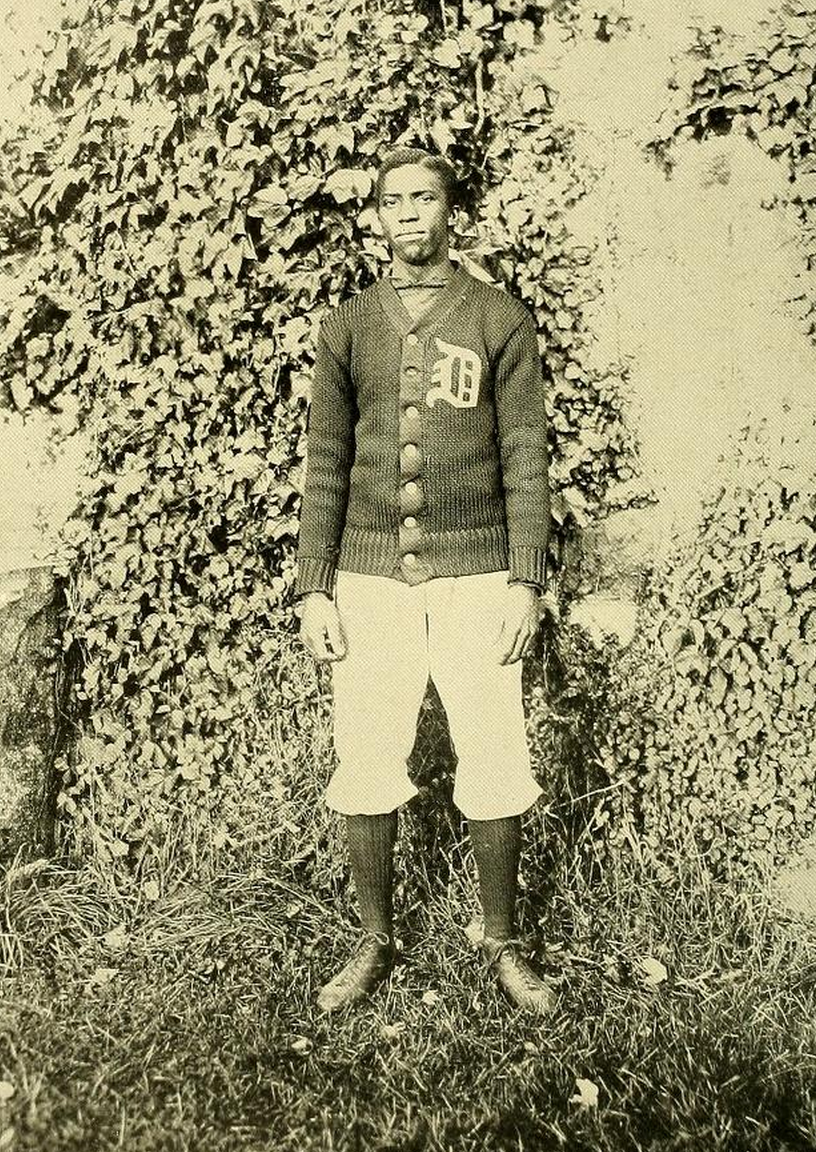
In 1904, Matthew W. Bullock became the first African American football coach at an integrated college

Massachusetts won their 100th game on October 2, 1920, topping rival Connecticut in a 28–0 shutout. The team played their 1000th game on November 11, 2000, losing to conference foe Delaware, 19–31. The team's nickname has endured several changes throughout the years. Though the official nickname remained "Aggies", "Statesmen" was also used interchangeably beginning when the school was renamed to Massachusetts State College in 1931. The nickname was officially changed to the "Redmen" when the name of the college became the University of Massachusetts in 1947.

Pittsburgh assistant coach Vic Fusia took over the Redmen football program in 1961 and under his tutelage, UMass compiled a record of 59–32–2. The Fusia era included an undefeated 8–0–1 campaign in 1963 as well as records of 8–2, 7–2, 6–3 and 7–2 in the following years. However, two losing records in three seasons led to Fusia's dismissal after the 1970 season. Denver Broncos linebackers and defensive backs coach Dick MacPherson, a former UMass assistant from 1959 to 1960, took over after Fusia's firing. Under MacPherson, the Redmen compiled a record of 45–27–1. In response to changing attitudes regarding the use of Native American-themed mascots, they changed their mascot in 1972 to the Minuteman, based on the historical "minuteman" relationship with Massachusetts; women's teams and athletes are known as Minutewomen.

=== Bob Pickett era (1978–1983) ===
Bob Pickett was promoted from defensive coordinator to head coach of the Minutemen football program in 1978. Under Pickett's tutelage, the Minutemen won four conference championships and compiled a record of 36–28. Despite the successes, back-to-back losing seasons in 1982 and 1983 led to Pickett's dismissal.

=== Bob Stull era (1984–1985) ===
Washington offensive coordinator Bob Stull was the next head coach for UMass, and he led the Minutemen to a 10–12 record in two seasons before leaving the program to accept the head coaching position at UTEP. Under Stull, the Minutemen struggled to a two-win campaign in 1984 but improved to seven wins in 1985.

=== Jim Reid era (1986–1991) ===
Jim Reid was promoted from defensive coordinator following Stull's departure and led the Minutemen for six seasons, compiling a 36–29–2 that included five non-losing seasons during his tenure. Reid and UMass parted ways after the 1991 season.

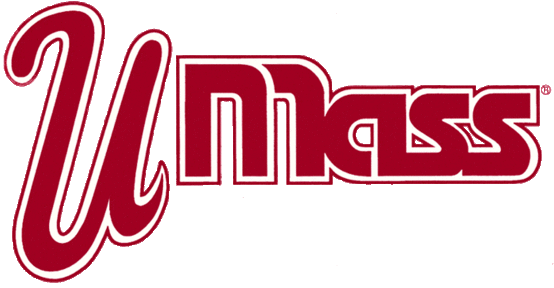
UMass logo from 1993 to 2003

=== Mike Hodges era (1992–1997) ===
UMass once again promoted their defensive coordinator, this time making Mike Hodges the team's head coach. Under Hodges, the Minutemen compiled a record of 35–30. Steady decline in the team's play that culminated with a 2–9 record in 1997 resulted in Hodges' firing.

=== Mark Whipple era (1998–2003) ===
In his first stint as coach of UMass from 1998 to 2003, Mark Whipple won the NCAA Division I-AA national championship. His UMass teams rewrote the record books, setting more than 40 team records. The 1998 national championship team posted school records in points scored (524), touchdowns (73), total yards (7,074), passing yards (4,050), completions (306), and first downs (354).

Whipple left college football for a position as an assistant coach with the Pittsburgh Steelers of the NFL in 2004.

=== Don Brown era (2004–2008) ===
In 2004, Northeastern head coach Don Brown returned to UMass, where he'd served as defensive coordinator from 1998–1999 to take over as head coach. During his tenure as head coach from 2004 to 2008, UMass posted the best five-year record in school history, 43–19. In his first year, he led the Minutemen to a 6–5 record, including victories over fourth-ranked Colgate, seventh-ranked New Hampshire, and ninth-ranked Maine. During 2005, Brown helped UMass to a 7–2 start and a final ranking of No. 19. That year, the Minutemen defeated fourth-ranked James Madison and handed Delaware their worst home loss in two decades, 35–7.

In 2006, Brown led Massachusetts to the Atlantic 10 conference championship and a finish as runners-up to the national championship. They ended the season ranked No. 2 with a 13–2 record. At home, he set a school record with a perfect 8–0 record in McGuirk Stadium. That season, Brown was named the AFCA Region I Coach of the Year, Atlantic 10 Coach of the Year, and New England Football Coach of the Year.

In 2007, UMass again won its conference, now as a member of the Colonial Athletic Association. The team advanced to the semifinals and finished the season with a No. 6 final ranking.

Brown left following the 2008 season to become defensive coordinator at Maryland.

=== Kevin Morris era (2009–2011) ===
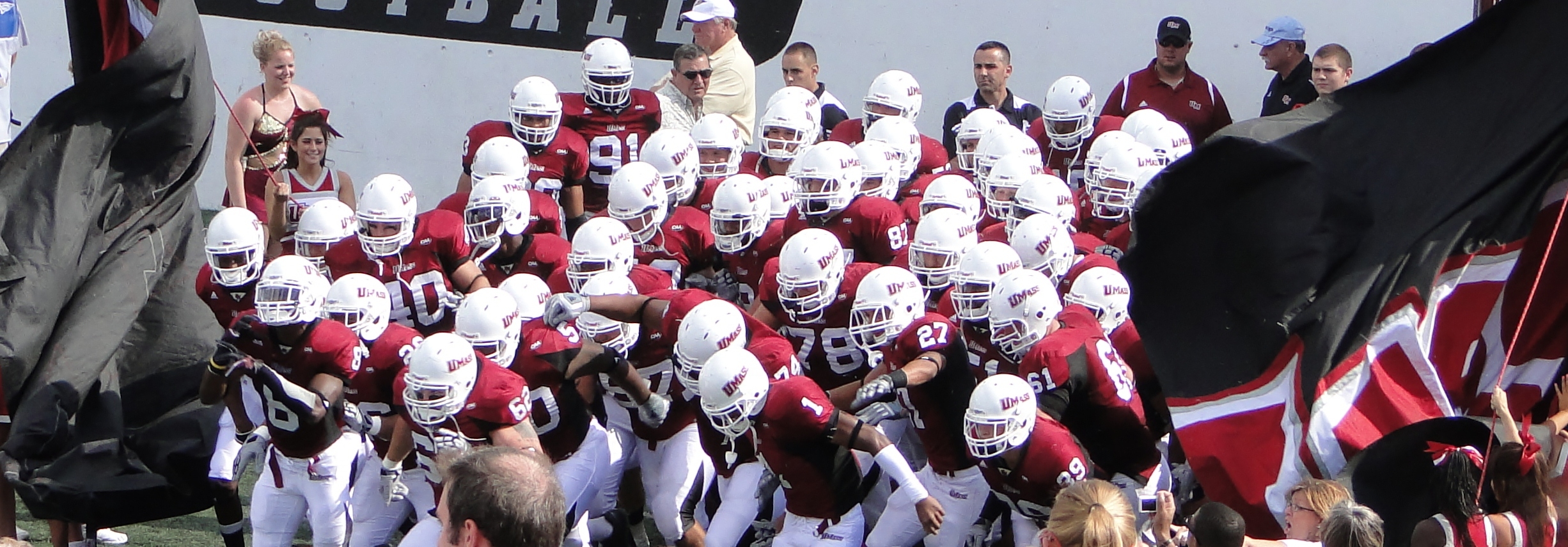
UMass football team in 2010

UMass promoted offensive coordinator Kevin Morris to head coach following Brown's departure. Under Morris, the Minutemen compiled a record of 16–17.

On April 20, 2011, after decades of studies and speculation, the UMass Minutemen formally announced they elevated their football program to the NCAA Football Bowl Subdivision and became a member of the Mid-American Conference beginning with the 2012 season. The announcement was made at Gillette Stadium, where the Minutemen play some of their home games. In 2011, UMass completed their last season in the Colonial Athletic Association, and were not eligible for NCAA postseason play. UMass played a full FBS and MAC schedule in 2013 and became eligible for the MAC championship and bowl participation.

Morris was fired as UMass' head coach following a 5–6 season in 2011.

=== Charley Molnar era (2012–2013) ===
Notre Dame offensive coordinator Charley Molnar was hired as UMass' head coach in December 2011.

The NCAA made a formal announcement of UMass' admission to FBS in the summer of 2013 after the program met specified benchmarks over its two transitioning years. The primary criteria centered around average attendance, an increase in scholarships from 63 to 85, and specific scheduling requirements. The NCAA did announce that the team must meet attendance requirements or face a 10-year probationary period. Along with joining the Mid-American Conference for football, the men's and women's basketball teams would play four non-conference games against MAC teams.

UMass struggled mightily under Molnar's tutelage, compiling back-to-back 1–11 campaigns in 2012 and 2013, the first two seasons UMass was a member of the MAC and FBS. Molnar was fired after two seasons as head coach.

=== Whipple's return (2014–2018) ===
Mark Whipple was selected as Molnar's replacement, returning to UMass after eleven years and stints in the NFL and college football as an assistant coach. In March 2014, the MAC and UMass announced an agreement for the Minutemen to leave the conference after the 2015 season due to UMass declining an offer to become a full member of the conference. In the agreement between the MAC and the university, there was a contractual clause that had UMass playing in the MAC as a football-only member for two more seasons if UMass declined a full membership offer. UMass announced that it would look for a "more suitable conference" for the team. Possibilities included becoming independent or joining the American Athletic Conference, Conference USA, or the Sun Belt Conference.

In September 2014, UMass announced that they would become independent beginning with the 2016 season.

In 2014 and 2015, the Minutemen finished with a 3–9 record.

UMass finished 2–10 in 2016. The Minutemen kicked off the season on September 3 with a 24–7 loss to No. 25 Florida. After a 26–7 loss to archrival Boston College, Whipple's team picked up its first win of the season by defeating FIU by a margin of 21–13. The next week, they lost to Mississippi State by a score of 47–35. On October 1, UMass lost to Tulane by a margin of 31–24. That was followed by a 36–16 defeat at the hands of Old Dominion. Next, Whipple's Minutemen were doubled up by Louisiana Tech in a 56–28 loss. After a 34–28 loss to South Carolina, Whipple's Minutemen defeated FCS opponent Wagner by a score of 34–10. On November 5, UMass lost to Troy by a margin of 52–31. That was followed by a 51–9 blowout at the hands of BYU. In the season finale, the Minutemen lost to Hawaii by a score of 46–40.

The Minutemen finished 4–8 in 2017. They began the season on August 26 with a 38–35 loss to Hawaii. In the season's second game, UMass lost to Coastal Carolina by a score of 38–28. A third straight loss followed in the form of a 17–7 defeat at the hands of Old Dominion on September 9. Next, Whipple's team lost to Temple by a margin of 29–21. On September 23, the Minutemen played a hard-fought game but ultimately fell short against Tennessee by a score of 17–13. After a 58–50 loss to Ohio, UMass finally broke through with their first victory of the season, defeating Georgia Southern by a margin of 55–20. They recorded a second straight win the following week with a 30–27 double overtime victory over Appalachian State. After a 34–23 loss to No. 21 Mississippi State, Whipple's Minutemen defeated FCS opponent Maine by a margin of 44–31. They picked up their fourth win of the season a week later by virtue of a 16–10 victory over BYU. UMass concluded the season with a 63–45 loss to FIU on December 2.

Coach Whipple stepped down on November 20, 2018.

=== Walt Bell era (2019–2021) ===
On December 3, 2018, Florida State offensive coordinator Walt Bell was hired as UMass' newest head coach. UMass would finish their 2019 season 1–11, opening 0–4. They would secure their first and only win vs Akron 37–29 on September 28, then drop the next 7 games. On August 11, 2020, UMass announced the cancellation of the 2020 season. Athletic Director Ryan Bamford explained, "The continuing challenges surrounding the COVID-19 pandemic posed too great of a risk." On September 21, UMass announced its intention to play a limited number of fall football games. UMass finished their fall campaign 0–4. They returned to a 12-game format in 2021. The Minutemen opened their 2021 season with a 51–7 loss at Pitt, starting a 5-game losing streak. They picked up a 27–13 win against UConn, however, to snap the streak. Bell was fired on November 7, 2021, following a 35–22 loss against FCS-ranked University of Rhode Island at homecoming on November 6, 2021, bringing his 2021 season record to 1–8. Offensive coordinator Alex Miller was named his interim replacement. UMass would drop their final 3 games of the season, finishing 1–11.

=== Don Brown's return (2022–2024) ===
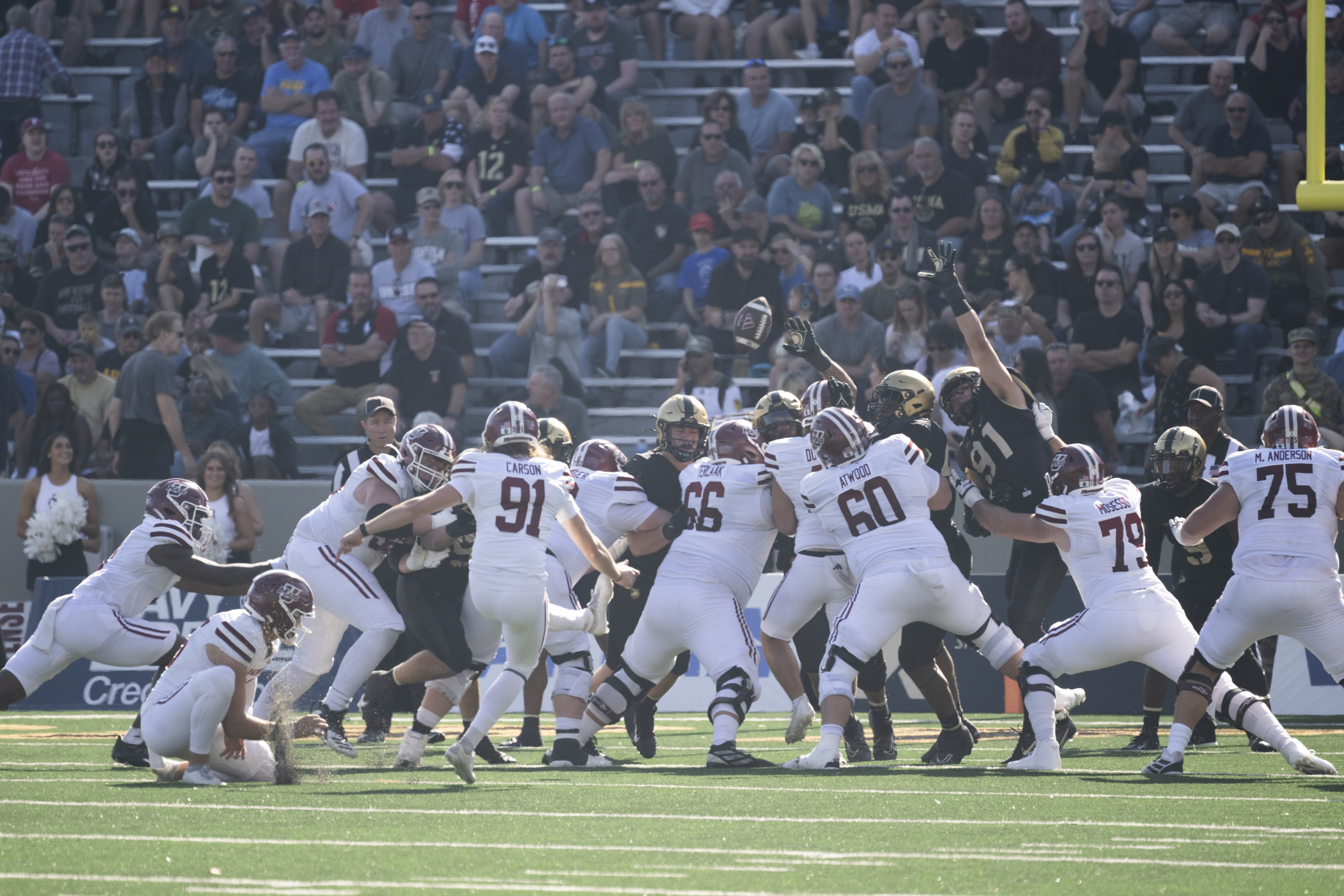
Cameron Carson kicks for UMass during a win over Army in 2023

On November 22, 2021, Don Brown, then serving as Arizona defensive coordinator, was officially rehired as the next coach of the UMass Minutemen. Brown would lead the Minutemen to a 1–11 season, beating FCS team Stony Brook 20–3 on September 17 and dropping their final game 7–44 to Army on November 26.

Brown was dismissed with two games remaining in 2024.

UMass' 2024 was the last season competing as an independent. The Minutemen rejoined the Mid-American Conference (MAC) as a full member beginning in 2025.

=== Joe Harasymiak era (2025-) ===
In 2025, the UMass Minutemen became the eighteenth team since the expansion to 12 game schedule to finish the season with a record of 0–12.

They started their 2026 campaign with a 37–21 statement victory over Rutgers, their first win in 677 days. It snaps their 16 game losing streak.

== Conference affiliations ==
- Independent (1879–1896)
- Athletic League of New England State Colleges (1897–1922)
- Independent (1923–1946)
- Yankee Conference (1947–1996)
- Atlantic 10 Conference (1997–2006)
- Colonial Athletic Association Football Conference (2007–2011)
- Mid-American Conference (2012–2015)
- Independent (2016–2024)
- Mid-American Conference (2025–present)

== Championships ==
=== National championships ===
Year	Coach	Conference record	Overall record	Postseason	Score	Opponent
1998	Mark Whipple	6–2	12–3	NCAA Division I-AA (FCS) Championship Game	55–43	Georgia Southern

=== Conference championships ===
UMass has won a total of 22 conference championships, 12 shared and 10 outright.

Season	Conference	Head coach	Overall record	Conference record
1960†	Yankee Conference	Charles Studley	7–2	3–1
1963	Yankee Conference	Vic Fusia	8–0–1	5–0
1964	Yankee Conference	Vic Fusia	8–2	5–0
1966	Yankee Conference	Vic Fusia	6–3	5–0
1967	Yankee Conference	Vic Fusia	7–2	5–0
1969	Yankee Conference	Vic Fusia	6–3	5–0
1971†	Yankee Conference	Dick MacPherson	4–4–1	3–1–1
1972	Yankee Conference	Dick MacPherson	9–2	5–0
1974†	Yankee Conference	Dick MacPherson	5–6	4–2
1977	Yankee Conference	Dick MacPherson	8–3	5–0
1978	Yankee Conference	Bob Pickett	9–4	5–0
1979†	Yankee Conference	Bob Pickett	6–4	4–1
1981†	Yankee Conference	Bob Pickett	6–3	4–1
1982†	Yankee Conference	Bob Pickett	5–6	3–2
1986†	Yankee Conference	Jim Reid	8–3	5–2
1988†	Yankee Conference	Jim Reid	8–4	6–2
1990	Yankee Conference	Jim Reid	8–2–1	7–1
1998†	Atlantic 10 Conference	Mark Whipple	8–2–1	7–1
1999†	Atlantic 10 Conference	Mark Whipple	9–4	7–1
2003†	Atlantic 10 Conference	Mark Whipple	10–3	8–1
2006	Atlantic 10 Conference	Don Brown	13–2	8–0
2007†	Colonial Athletic Association	Don Brown	10–3	7–1

† Co-champions

== Postseason appearances ==
=== Division II playoffs ===
Season	Date	Round	Opponent	Result	Location
1977	November 26	Quarterfinal	Lehigh	L 23–30	Amherst, Massachusetts

=== Division I-AA playoffs ===
Season	Date	Round	Opponent	Result	Location
1978	December 9	Semifinal	Nevada	W 44–21	Reno, Nevada
1978	December 16	Championship	Florida A&M	L 28–35	Wichita Falls, Texas
1988	November 26	First Round	Eastern Kentucky	L 17–28	Richmond, Kentucky
1990	November 24	First Round	William & Mary	L 0–38	Williamsburg, Virginia
1998	November 28	First Round	McNeese State	W 21–19	Lake Charles, Louisiana
1998	December 5	Quarterfinal	Lehigh	W 27–21	Amherst, Massachusetts
1998	December 12	Semifinal	Northwestern State	W 41–31	Natchitoches, Louisiana
1998	December 19	Championship	Georgia Southern	W 55–43	Chattanooga, Tennessee
1999	November 27	First Round	Furman	W 30–23 ^{OT}	Greenville, South Carolina
1999	December 4	Quarterfinal	Georgia Southern	L 21–38	Statesboro, Georgia
2003	November 29	First Round	Colgate	L 7–19	Hamilton, New York
2006	November 25	First Round	Lafayette	W 35–14	Amherst, Massachusetts
2006	December 2	Quarterfinal	New Hampshire	W 24–17	Amherst, Massachusetts
2006	December 12	Semifinal	Montana	W 19–17	Missoula, Montana
2006	December 15	Championship	Appalachian State	L 17–28	Chattanooga, Tennessee
2007	November 24	First Round	Fordham	W 49–35	Amherst, Massachusetts
2007	December 1	Quarterfinal	Southern Illinois	L 27–34	Carbondale, Illinois

== Bowl games ==
In their time in the NCAA College Division and NCAA Division I-AA, UMass played in three bowl games, where they went 1–2. Since joining Division I FBS in 2012, the Minutemen are the only program in the classification to have not competed in a bowl game.

=== NCAA College Division ===
Season	Bowl	Opponent	Result
1964	Tangerine Bowl	East Carolina	L 13–14
1972	Boardwalk Bowl	UC Davis	W 35–14

=== NCAA Division I-AA ===
Season	Bowl	Opponent	Result
1978	Pioneer Bowl	Florida A&M	L 35–28

== Head coaches ==
No.	Years	Season(s)	Coach	Record	Pct.
1	1879–1897		No coach	30–58–6	.351
2	1898	1	David F. Weeks	1–4–1	.250
3	1899–1900	2	Fred W. Murphy	12–8	.600
4	1901–1903	3	James Halligan	16–8–2	.654
5	1904, 1907–1908	1, 2	Matthew Bullock	13–8–5	.596
6	1905	1	Walter Craig	3–7	.300
7	1906	1	George E. O'Hearn	1–7–1	.167
8	1909	1	J. W. Gage	1–6–2	.222
9	1910	1	Willard Gildersleeve	1–6–2	.222
10	1911	1	Jack Hubbard	2–7	.222
11	1912–1915	4	Arthur Brides	12–15–4	.452
12	1916	1	George Melican	2–4–2	.375
	1917-1918		NO TEAM		
13	1919–1927	9	Harold Gore	33–32–5	.507
14	1928–1930	3	Charles McGeoch	6–17–2	.500
15	1931–1935	5	Mel Taube	29–13–2	.682
16	1936–1940	5	Elbert Carraway	9–32–3	.239
17	1941–1942, 1946	2, 1	Walter Hargesheimer	11–11–1	.500
	1943–1944		NO TEAM		
18	1945, 1947–1951	1, 5	Thomas Eck	17–23–4	.432
19	1952–1959	8	Charlie O'Rourke	21–39–4	.359
20	1960	1	Chuck Studley	7–2	.778
21	1961–1970	10	Vic Fusia	59–32–2	.645
22	1971–1977	7	Dick MacPherson	45–27–1	.623
23	1978–1983	6	Bob Pickett	36–28	.563
24	1984–1985	2	Bob Stull	10–12	.455
25	1986–1991	6	Jim Reid	36–29–2	.552
26	1992–1997	6	Mike Hodges	35–30	.538
27	1998–2003	6	Mark Whipple	49–26	.653 (Note: Combined tenure record of 65–70 (.481))
28	2004–2008	5	Don Brown	43–19	.694 (Note: Combined tenure record of 49–47 (.510))
29	2009–2011	3	Kevin Morris	16–17	.485
30	2012–2013	2	Charley Molnar	2–22	.083
31	2014–2018	5	Mark Whipple	16–44	.267
32	2019–2021	3	Walt Bell	2–23	.080
33	2021	1	Alex Miller (interim)	0–3	.000
34	2022–2024	3	Don Brown	6–28	.176
35	2024	1	Shane Montgomery (interim)	0–2	.000
36	2025–present	1	Joe Harasymiak	0–12	.000

=== Personnel ===
==== Coaching staff ====
Massachusetts Minutemen
Name	Position	Consecutive season at Massachusetts in current position	Previous position
Shane Montgomery	Offensive coordinator / quarterbacks	1st	ECU – Offensive Analyst (2023)
Damian Mincey	Run game coordinator / running backs	3rd	Albany – Wide receivers (2018-2021)
Matt Zanellato	Wide receivers	3rd	Saginaw Valley State (D2) – Wide receiver's coach (2021)
Matt Layman	Tight ends	5th	UMass – Tight ends / Grad. Asst. (2019–present)
Alex Miller	Offensive line	4th	New Hampshire – Offensive line (2011–2020)
--	Co-defensive coordinator / safeties	1st	--
Keith Dudzinski	Co-defensive coordinator / inside linebackers	3rd	Arizona – Outside linebackers / special teams coordinator (2021)
Steven Daniels	Defensive line	2nd	Boston College – Asst. director of defensive recruiting (2022)
Mike McCray	Outside linebackers	3rd	Notre Dame – Grad. Asst. (2021)
Michael Livingston	Defensive backs	2nd	Sacred Heart (D2) – defensive pass game coordinator/cornerbacks coach (2017–2021)
Ben Albert	Special teams coordinator	3rd	Duke – Defensive lines coach (2016–2021)
Scott McLafferty	Director of strength & conditioning	2nd	Colorado State – Director of strength & conditioning (2020–2022)

== Rivalries ==
=== Boston College ===
Massachusetts and Boston College are in-state rivals. The first game played between the two schools took place in 1899 and was played at a neutral location. Boston College won 18–0. At the time, UMass was known as Massachusetts Agricultural College. The relative proximity between the schools encouraged them to schedule additional matches in the subsequent years.

BC and UMass met again in Amherst in 1901, 1902, and 1912, with UMass winning all three contests before the series was halted. The two universities did not meet again on the football field until 1966, when they began a seventeen-year series in which the teams would play each other in the last week of UMass' football season. UMass was in a lower division than BC during the entirety of the rivalry. As such, Boston College dominated the stretch, winning fifteen of the seventeen games, routinely blowing out the overmatched Minutemen.

After 22 years, the rivalry was renewed as UMass traveled to Chestnut Hill to play Boston College once again. UMass was yet again outmatched, losing 29–7. The universities agreed to play two more times over the next seven years, and Boston College won both games easily.

In April 2011, UMass announced plans to join the Mid-American Conference and move up to the NCAA Football Bowl Subdivision, the highest level of college football in the country. Boston College had been a member of this subdivision for decades, and there was much speculation that the two schools may cultivate a renewal of the rivalry. This was confirmed when it was reported in September 2011 that they had agreed to play a three-game biannual series beginning in 2014. Two of the games were played at Gillette Stadium and the other was held at BC's Alumni Stadium.

Most recently, the two teams met in September 2021, with BC winning 45–28.

UMass vs Boston College: All-Time Record
Games played	First meeting	Last meeting	UMass wins	UMass losses	UMass ties
27	1899 (Lost 18–0)	2021 (Lost 45–28)	5	23	0

=== Connecticut ===
The first game played between Massachusetts and UConn took place on November 6, 1897, in Amherst. UMass won 36–0. At the time, UMass was known as Massachusetts Agricultural College and Connecticut was officially Storrs Agricultural College. They had formed a loose association with other public colleges in New England such as present day New Hampshire and Rhode Island for the purpose of scheduling football matchups between the schools.

The colleges continued to schedule matches intermittently until after World War I, when they began to play on an almost-yearly basis through the mid-1920s. The series was discontinued until 1932, when the schools again met each year until World War II saw both universities disband their football teams. The schools would not match up again on the gridiron until UConn joined Massachusetts in the Yankee Conference in 1952. UConn and UMass played every season from that point on until UConn began their transition to what was then Division I-A in 2000.

The all-time series is tied 38–38–2. Massachusetts dominated the rivalry early, winning the first eight and 13 of the first 15 meetings between the two universities. Connecticut went on a streak of their own after that, winning 14 of the next 16 games. The 1960s again belonged to the then-Redmen of Massachusetts, as they lost only two games that decade. In the remaining years of the rivalry, the series was much more even, with neither team able to put together a winning streak of more than four games.

In April 2011, UMass announced plans to join the Mid-American Conference and move up to the NCAA Football Bowl Subdivision, the highest level of college football in the country. Prior to this decision, the two schools had scheduled a game for August 30, 2012. UMass later became a FBS Independent school starting in 2016.

UMass vs UConn: All-Time Record
Games played	First meeting	Last meeting	UMass wins	UMass losses	UMass ties
79	1897 (Win 36–0)	2026 (Lost 35–16)	38	39	2

=== Buffalo ===
On October 15th, 2025, Massachusetts and fellow MAC program Buffalo announced a new rivalry series sponsored by Milton-CAT called The Flagship Cup ahead of their matchup on October 18th. Buffalo currently leads the all-time series 11–6.

UMass vs Buffalo: All-Time Record
Games played	First meeting	Last meeting	UMass wins	UMass losses	UMass ties
17	1964 (Win 24–20)	2026 (Lost 25–18)	6	11	0

== Facilities ==
=== Alumni Field ===
The first field that the Minutemen played at was called Alumni Field, and was situated on the south end of campus. This field was replaced in 1915 by a new venue, also called Alumni Field. It was replaced in 1965 by Alumni Stadium, and later became the location of the Whitmore Administration Building.

=== McGuirk Alumni Stadium ===
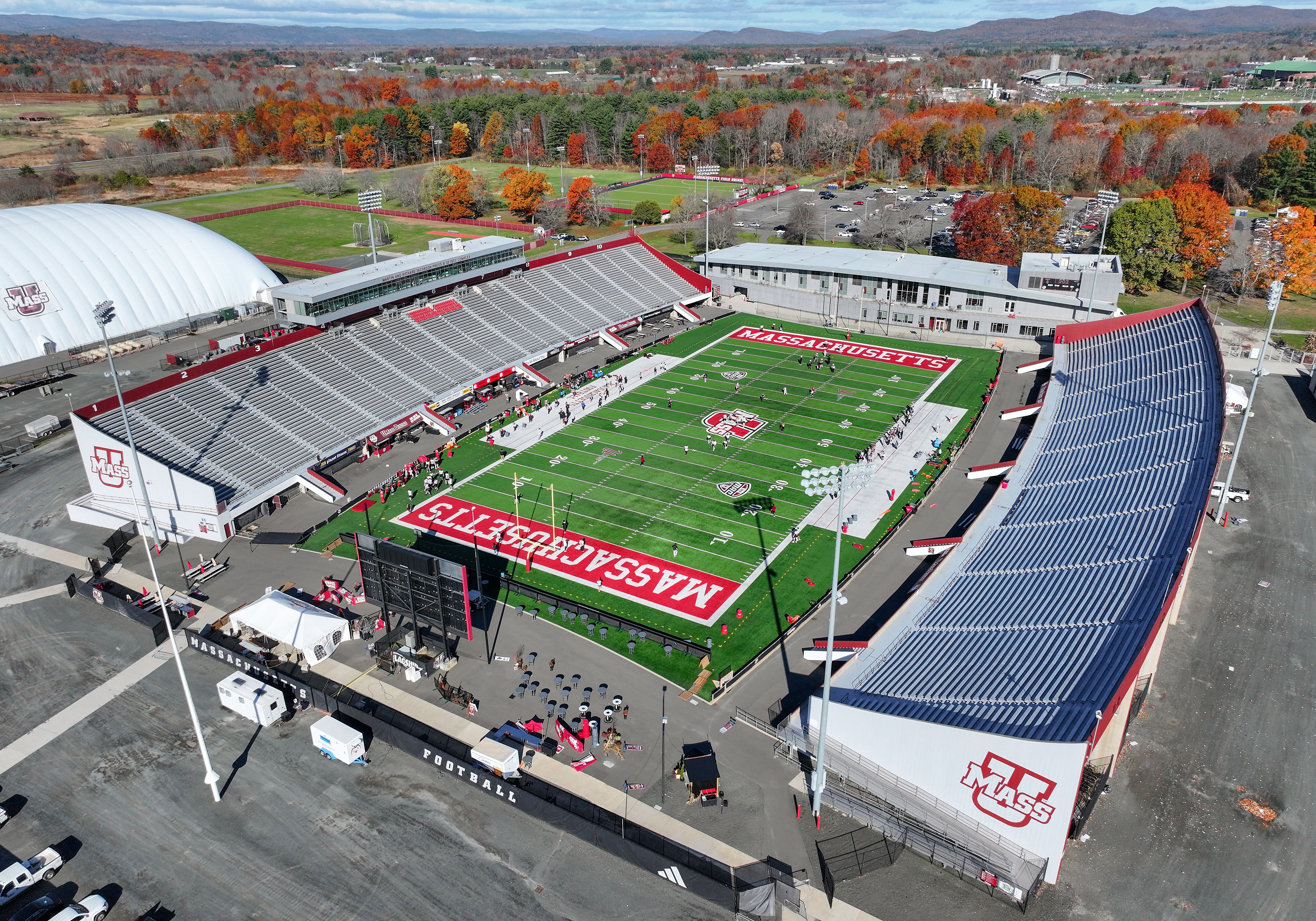
Warren McGuirk Alumni Stadium

The Minutemen played their last home football game for three years at McGuirk Alumni Stadium, a 17,000 seat stadium on the UMass Amherst campus in 2011. The stadium itself sits just over the town line in neighboring Hadley. The inaugural game took place on September 25, 1965, when UMass defeated the AIC Yellow Jackets, 41–0. Since the opening, UMass has enjoyed a decided home-field advantage, posting a 182–79–2 record when playing at McGuirk. The attendance record at McGuirk was set during a UMass football game against Boston College on November 25, 1972; 20,000 fans were in attendance. McGuirk was partially renovated for a return of UMass football. The expansion included a new performance center with new locker rooms and training facilities, and a new press box. In the 2012 and 2013 seasons UMass played all their home games at Gillette Stadium, but they returned to McGuirk beginning with three games in 2014. Since 2019, the Minutemen have played all of their home games at McGuirk Stadium.

=== Gillette Stadium ===
UMass first played at Gillette Stadium in the "Colonial Clash" against the University of New Hampshire on October 23, 2010. This game was renewed for the 2011 season as UMass played New Hampshire there again. For 2012–2013 the team played all of their home games at Gillette. UMass later split their home games between Gillette Stadium and the on-campus McGuirk Alumni Stadium. The last home game UMass played at Gillette Stadium was in 2018.

== Notable alumni ==
=== NFL All-Pros and Pro Bowlers ===
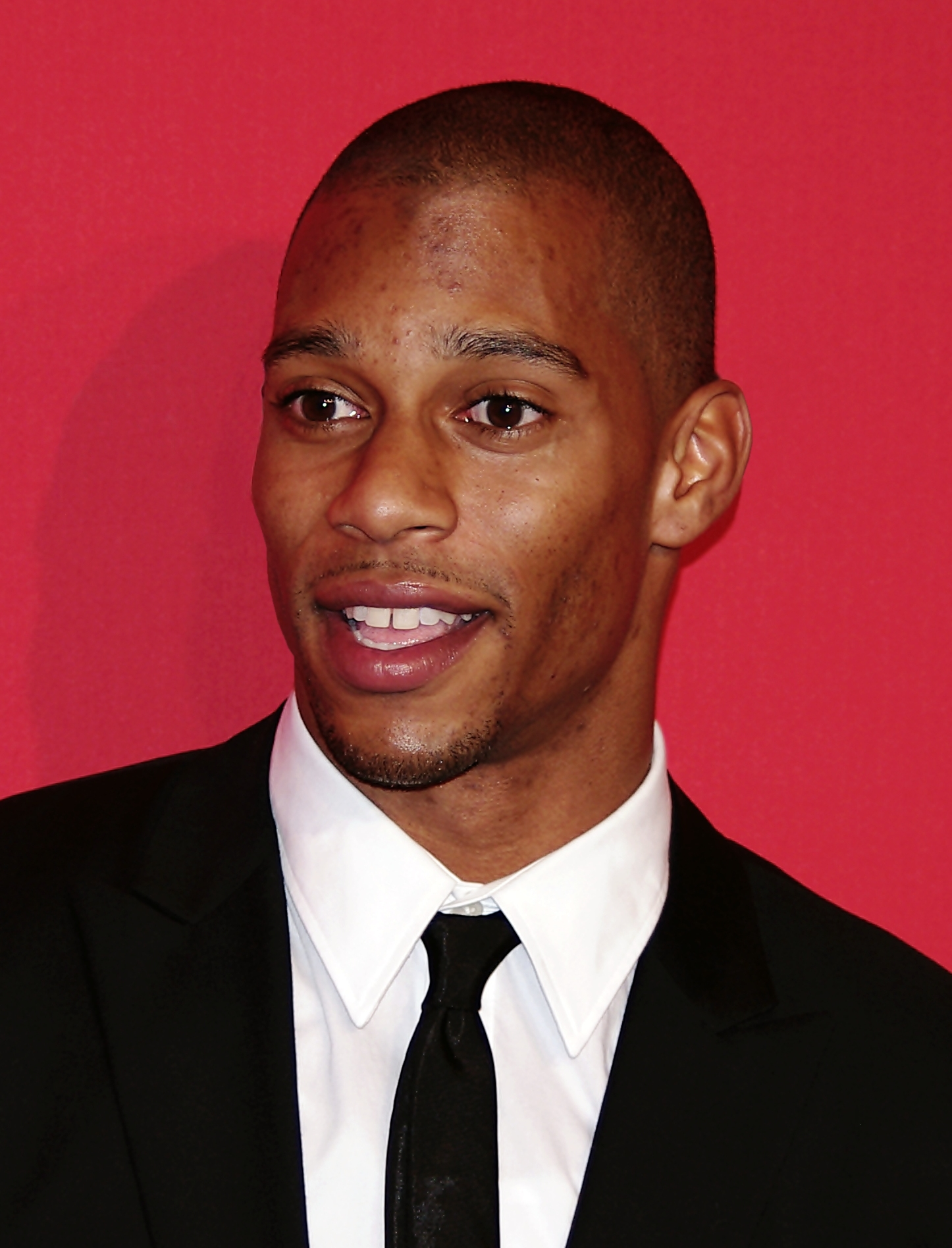
WR Victor Cruz

Player	All-Pro	Pro Bowl
Milt Morin	none	1968, 1971
Greg Landry	1971	1971
Victor Cruz	2011	2012

=== Current NFL players ===
Player	Position	Team	Years at UMass
Claudin Cherelus	LB	Carolina Panthers	2017–2019
Jack Driscoll	OT	Pittsburgh Steelers	2015–2017
Isaiah Rodgers	CB	Minnesota Vikings	2016-2019
Josh Wallace	CB	Los Angeles Rams	2019-2022
Elijah Wilkinson	OT	Atlanta Falcons	2013–2016

== Individual awards ==
UMass has had more than 70 players named to various All-American teams since Lou Bush garnered the first selection for the Minutemen (then called the Aggies) in 1934.

=== Conference honors ===
The following is a list of all Minutemen who were named Player, Coach, or Rookie of the Year for their respective conference.

Year	Name	Position	Award
1985	Dave Palazzi	QB	YanCon Rookie of the Year
1988	Tim Bryant	QB	YanCon Rookie of the Year
1988	John McKeown	LB	YanCon Defensive Player of the Year
1988	Jim Reid	HC	YanCon Coach of the Year
1990	Gary Wilkos	QB	YanCon Offensive Player of the Year
1990	John Johnson	RB	YanCon Rookie of the Year
1990	Jim Reid	HC	YanCon Coach of the Year
1992	Rene Ingoglia	RB	YanCon Rookie of the Year
1994	Brian Corcoran	DL	YanCon Defensive Player of the Year
1998	Khari Samuel	LB	A-10 Defensive Player of the Year
1999	Adrian Zullo	WR	A-10 Rookie of the Year
2002	R.J. Cobbs	RB	A-10 Rookie of the Year
2003	Mark Whipple	HC	A-10 Coach of the Year
2004	Shannon James	DB	A-10 Defensive Player of the Year
2005	Christian Koegel	P	A-10 Special Teams Player of the Year
2006	Steve Baylark	RB	A-10 Offensive Player of the Year
2006	Don Brown	HC	A-10 Coach of the Year
2010	Tyler Holmes	LB	CAA Defensive Player of the Year

=== College Football Hall of Fame ===
The following is a list of all Minutemen inducted in the College Football Hall of Fame.

Name	Position	Years at UMass	Inducted	Ref.
Dick MacPherson	HC	1971–1977	2009	
Milt Morin	TE	1963–1965	2010	

== Future opponents ==
Announced schedules as of October 6, 2026.

2026	2027	2028	2029	2030	2032	2036
at Rutgers	at Temple	at Colorado	at UConn	at USF	Army	Army
Sacred Heart	Stony Brook	Wagner	at UCF			
Stonehill	at Wisconsin	at Penn State	Bryant			
at UConn	UConn	New Mexico State	Temple			
