= McGahee =

McGahee is a surname. Notable people with the surname include:

- Casey McGahee (born 1983), Canadian football player
- Willis McGahee (born 1981), American football player

== See also ==
- McGahey
- McGhee
