= Doug Berry (Canadian football) =

American Canadian football coach

Personal information
- Born: July 17, 1948 (age 78); Claremont, New Hampshire, U.S.

Career history
- 1976: New Hampshire (Asst.)
- 1978: Penn State (Asst.)
- 1979–1980: Boston College (Asst.)
- 1981–1997: UMass (Asst.)
- 1998: Richmond (Asst.)
- 1999–2005: Montreal Alouettes (Asst.)
- 2006–2008: Winnipeg Blue Bombers (HC)
- 2010–2011: Saskatchewan Roughriders (Asst. HC/OC)
- 2013: Montreal Alouettes (Senior advisor)
- 2013: Montreal Alouettes (OC)

Doug Berry (born July 17, 1948) is an American football coach. He served as the head coach of the Winnipeg Blue Bombers of the Canadian Football League (CFL). He was also the offensive coordinator for both the Saskatchewan Roughriders and Montreal Alouettes.

== Early life ==
Berry was born in Claremont, New Hampshire and graduated from the University of New Hampshire in 1973 with a degree in Recreation and Parks Administration. He did two years of active duty in the United States Army after being drafted in 1968. Berry spent a year and a half working in Germany as an army sergeant. After his military discharge, he became a sales manager in a small business selling stereo equipment until deciding in 1976 that he wanted to become an American football coach.

== College coaching career ==
Berry began his coaching career in 1976 at the University of New Hampshire, his alma mater, before working with Penn State's offensive line in 1978. During his first year at PSU, the team played in the National Collegiate Athletic Association national championship game.

He then spent two years coaching Boston College's offensive line before moving on to his 17-year stay at the University of Massachusetts Amherst. He was an assistant with the UMass Minutemen football team from 1981 to 1997, coaching running backs, quarterbacks, and the offensive line over his tenure.

Berry coached the running backs at the University of Richmond in Virginia in 1998. Berry spent only one year at Richmond before moving to Montreal, Quebec, Canada to join the Alouettes in the Canadian Football League (CFL).

== CFL coaching career ==
In 1999, Berry began with the Montreal Alouettes as their offensive line coach. During this time Montreal had three players named as the CFL's Most Outstanding Lineman, Uzooma Okeke in 1999, Pierre Vercheval in 2000, and Bryan Chiu in 2002. His O-line helped star running back Mike Pringle win the CFL's rushing title in 1999 and 2000. The Alouettes won the Grey Cup in 2002.

Berry was promoted to co-offensive co-ordinator (with Kevin Strasser) and quarterbacks coach in 2003. In 2003, quarterback Anthony Calvillo posted a career-high 5,891 passing yards and 37 touchdowns. Calvillo set more personal bests the following year with 6,041 passing yards and added 5,556 yards to his career total. Calvillo led the league in passing yards for both the 2003 and 2004 seasons.

On December 15, 2005, Berry signed a multi-year contract to become the 26th head coach in Winnipeg Blue Bombers history. After guiding the team to a 9–9 record in the 2006 CFL season, he took the Bombers to their first playoff game since 2003, but ended up losing to the Toronto Argonauts in the East Division semi-final.

After the 2006 season he was nominated for Coach of the Year, but lost to Wally Buono of the BC Lions.

During the 2007 campaign, Berry's Bombers got off to a hot start, but struggled against division opponents in the closing weeks. As a result, the team finished one point behind the Toronto Argonauts in the East Division, despite leading in the division for much of the year, and did not earn a first round bye. However, the Blue Bombers won each of their first two playoff matchups, and earned a spot in the 95th Grey Cup. The team failed to capture the 2007 title, losing to the Saskatchewan Roughriders.

The 2008 CFL season saw the Blue Bombers finish with an 8 wins, 10 losses season and a loss to the Edmonton Eskimos in the East semi-final playoff game. Berry was fired shortly after, on November 12, 2008.

Berry spent the 2010 season as the offensive coordinator for the Saskatchewan Roughriders, but was fired after the eighth game of the 2011 season on August 19, 2011.

On February 19, 2013, Berry was introduced as the senior advisor to the head coach of the Montreal Alouettes at a news conference in Montreal. Following the firing of Dan Hawkins after a 2–3 start to the season, Berry was promoted to run the offense in July 2013. Berry was dismissed by Jim Popp in November 2013 after Popp became the general manager and interim head coach of the Montreal Alouettes.

== Personal life ==
Berry and his wife live in Florida. They have two daughters, Jessica and Kasey.

=== Head coaching record ===
Team	Year	Regular season					Postseason		
Team	Year	Won	Lost	Ties	Win %	Finish	Won	Lost	Result
WPG	2006	9	9	0	.500	3rd in East Division	0	1	Lost in Division Semi-finals
WPG	2007	10	7	1	.583	2nd in East Division	2	1	Lost in Grey Cup
WPG	2008	8	10	0	.444	2nd in East Division	0	1	Lost In Division Semi-Finals
Total		27	26	1	.509	0 East Division; Championships	2	3	0 Grey Cups
