= UMass Minutewomen rowing =

American college rowing team

- Founded: 1994
- University: University of Massachusetts Amherst
- Athletic director: Ryan Bamford
- Head coach: Eric Carcich (7 season)
- Conference: MAC; I Division
- Location: Amherst, Massachusetts, US
- Nickname: Minutewomen
- Colors: Maroon and white

NCAA Championship appearances
- 1997, 1998, 1999, 2014, 2015, 2017, 2026

Conference champions
- A-10: 1996, 1997, 1998, 1999, 2000, 2001, 2002, 2003, 2004, 2005, 2006, 2007, 2009, 2014, 2015, 2017, 2026

The UMass Minutewomen rowing team represents the University of Massachusetts Amherst in the Mid-American Conference in NCAA Division I college rowing.

== History ==
UMass women's rowing has won the Atlantic 10 rowing title 16 times, in 1996, 1997, 1998, 1999, 2000, 2001, 2002, 2003, 2004, 2005, 2006, 2007, 2009, 2014, 2015, and 2017. In 2026, after switching conferences to the MAC, UMass won the MAC rowing title.

The Minutewomen rowing team has been a varsity sport since the 1994-95 season and a member of the Atlantic 10 since the 1995-96 season.

On July 19, 2024, it was announced that women's rowing would be moving to the Mid-American Conference (MAC) as part of the new MAC women's rowing league starting in the 2025-26 season.

The 2026 MAC Rowing Championship was held at Ford Lake Park in Ypsilanti, Michigan. UMass won all five events it was entered, including the NCAA scoring crews: 1v8+, 2v8+, and 1v4+. UMass earned the automatic bid to the 2026 NCAA Rowing Championship with this win.
