= UConn–UMass rivalry =

American college sports rivalry

- UConn Huskies UMass Minutemen

Locations of UConn and UMass

The UConn–UMass rivalry is a growing sports rivalry between the Huskies of the University of Connecticut and the Minutemen of the University of Massachusetts Amherst.

College comparison
	UConn	UMass
Founded	1881	1863
Type	Public	Public
Conference	Big East	MAC
Students	24,371	32,045
School colors		
Nickname	Huskies	Minutemen

== Football ==
UConn–UMass football rivalry
- UConn Huskies UMass Minutemen
- Sport: Football
- First meeting: November 6, 1897; UMass 36, Connecticut 0
- Latest meeting: October 23, 2026; UConn 35, UMass 16
- Next meeting: October 16, 2027
- Trophy: Southwick Jug

Statistics
- Total meetings: 78
- All-time series: UConn leads, 39–38–2
- Largest victory: Connecticut, 71–6 (1956)
- Longest win streak: UMass, 8 (1897–1922)
- Current win streak: UConn, 4 (2022–present)

The UConn–UMass football rivalry is an American college football rivalry between the UConn Huskies football team of the University of Connecticut and the UMass Minutemen football team of the University of Massachusetts Amherst. The game is affectionately known as the “C-UM Bowl”, a play on the names of the teams.

The rivalry was dormant from the 2000 season, when UConn moved to FBS, until 2012, when UMass traveled to Rentschler Field to play the Huskies in the season opener.

=== History ===
The first game played between the two schools took place on November 6, 1897, in Amherst, Massachusetts. Massachusetts won 36–0. At the time, UMass was known as Massachusetts Agricultural College and Connecticut was officially Storrs Agricultural College. They had formed a loose association with other public colleges in New England such as present day New Hampshire and Rhode Island for the purpose of scheduling football matchups between the schools.

The colleges continued to schedule matches intermittently until after World War I, when they began to play on an almost-yearly basis through the mid-1920s. The series was discontinued until 1932, when the schools again met each year until World War II saw both universities disband their football teams. The schools would not match up again on the gridiron until UConn joined Massachusetts in the Yankee Conference in 1952. UConn and UMass played every season from that point on until UConn began their transition to what was then Division I-A in 2000.

The all-time series is tied 38–38–2. Massachusetts dominated the rivalry early, winning the first eight and 13 of the first 15 meetings between the two universities. Connecticut went on a streak of their own after that, winning 14 of the next 16 games. The 1960s again belonged to the then-Redmen of Massachusetts, as they lost only two games that decade. In the remaining years of the rivalry, the series was much more even, with neither team able to put together a winning streak of more than four games.

In April 2011, UMass announced plans to join the Mid-American Conference and move up to the NCAA Football Bowl Subdivision, the highest level of college football in the country. Prior to this decision, the two schools had scheduled a game for August 30, 2012. UMass later became a FBS Independent school starting in 2016.

The Huskies won the latest matchup against the Minutemen during the 2026 season in East Hartford, CT.

On October 31, 2022, UConn and UMass extended the rivalry games through 2027. In 2025 UMass accepted full membership in the Mid-American Conference. The 2025 game was canceled due to UMass needing to make room for eight conference games. The canceled 2025 game was rescheduled for 2029.

=== Game results ===
Connecticut victories	Massachusetts victories	Tie games

No.	Date	Location	Winner	Score
1	November 6, 1897	Amherst, MA	Massachusetts	36–0
2	November 4, 1899	Amherst, MA	Massachusetts	34–6
3	November 3, 1900	Storrs, CT	Massachusetts	17–6
4	October 7, 1916	Amherst, MA	Massachusetts	12–0
5	October 4, 1919	Amherst, MA	Massachusetts	15–7
6	October 2, 1920	Amherst, MA	Massachusetts	28–0
7	October 1, 1921	Storrs, CT	Massachusetts	13–0
8	October 7, 1922	Amherst, MA	Massachusetts	13–6
9	September 27, 1924	Amherst, MA	Connecticut	12–10
10	October 17, 1925	Storrs, CT	Massachusetts	13–0
11	October 9, 1926	Amherst, MA	Connecticut	13–6
12	October 15, 1932	Storrs, CT	Massachusetts State	39–0
13	October 14, 1933	Amherst, MA	Massachusetts State	40–7
14	October 13, 1934	Storrs, CT	Massachusetts State	7–6
15	October 12, 1935	Amherst, MA	Massachusetts State	25–12
16	October 10, 1936	Storrs, CT	Connecticut State	13–0
17	October 9, 1937	Amherst, MA	Connecticut State	36–7
18	October 8, 1938	Storrs, CT	Connecticut State	19–0
19	October 14, 1939	Amherst, MA	Connecticut	7–6
20	October 5, 1940	Storrs, CT	Connecticut	13–0
21	October 4, 1941	Amherst, MA	Massachusetts State	8–6
22	October 3, 1942	Storrs, CT	Connecticut	26–0
23	October 4, 1952	Storrs, CT	Connecticut	26–13
24	October 3, 1953	Amherst, MA	Connecticut	41–0
25	October 9, 1954	Amherst, MA	Massachusetts	20–13
26	October 8, 1955	Storrs, CT	Connecticut	18–13
27	October 13, 1956	Amherst, MA	Connecticut	71–6
28	October 12, 1957	Storrs, CT	Connecticut	19–6
29	October 11, 1958	Amherst, MA	Connecticut	28–14
30	October 10, 1959	Storrs, CT	Connecticut	26–0
31	October 8, 1960	Amherst, MA	Connecticut	31–0
32	October 14, 1961	Storrs, CT	Massachusetts	31–13
33	October 13, 1962	Amherst, MA	Massachusetts	16–6
34	October 12, 1963	Storrs, CT	Massachusetts	21–3
35	October 10, 1964	Amherst, MA	Massachusetts	30–0
36	October 9, 1965	Storrs, CT	Massachusetts	20–7
37	October 8, 1966	Amherst, MA	Massachusetts	12–6
38	October 14, 1967	Storrs, CT	Massachusetts	35–14
39	October 26, 1968	Amherst, MA	Connecticut	27–20
40	October 25, 1969	Storrs, CT	Massachusetts	28–7

No.	Date	Location	Winner	Score
41	October 24, 1970	Amherst, MA	Tie	21–21
42	October 23, 1971	Storrs, CT	Tie	3–3
43	October 28, 1972	Amherst, MA	Massachusetts	49–16
44	October 27, 1973	Storrs, CT	Connecticut	28–6
45	October 26, 1974	Amherst, MA	Connecticut	10–9
46	October 25, 1975	Storrs, CT	Massachusetts	29–14
47	October 23, 1976	Amherst, MA	Connecticut	28–6
48	October 22, 1977	Storrs, CT	Massachusetts	10–0
49	October 28, 1978	Amherst, MA	Massachusetts	17–10
50	October 27, 1979	Storrs, CT	Connecticut	24–0
51	November 1, 1980	Amherst, MA	Massachusetts	39–21
52	October 31, 1981	Storrs, CT	Massachusetts	29–24
53	October 30, 1982	Amherst, MA	Massachusetts	30–14
54	October 29, 1983	Storrs, CT	Connecticut	16–6
55	November 3, 1984	Amherst, MA	Connecticut	21–16
56	November 2, 1985	Storrs, CT	Massachusetts	21–7
57	November 22, 1986	Amherst, MA	Connecticut	20–17
58	October 17, 1987	Storrs, CT	Connecticut	21–17
59	October 15, 1988	Amherst, MA	Connecticut	35–14
60	October 14, 1989	Storrs, CT	Connecticut	39–33
61	October 13, 1990	Amherst, MA	Massachusetts	38–19
62	October 19, 1991	Storrs, CT	Connecticut	26–21
63	October 17, 1992	Amherst, MA	Massachusetts	20–7
64	October 16, 1993	Storrs, CT	Massachusetts	20–17
65	November 19, 1994	Amherst, MA	Connecticut	21–13
66	November 18, 1995	Storrs, CT	Connecticut	20–7
67	November 16, 1996	Amherst, MA	Massachusetts	39–38
68	November 15, 1997	Amherst, MA	Connecticut	49–16
69	October 17, 1998	Storrs, CT	Connecticut	44–41
70	November 21, 1998	Amherst, MA	Connecticut	28–27
71	November 20, 1999	Amherst, MA	Massachusetts	62–20
72	August 30, 2012	East Hartford, CT	Connecticut	37–0
73	October 27, 2018	East Hartford, CT	Massachusetts	22–17
74	October 26, 2019	Amherst, MA	Connecticut	56–35
75	October 9, 2021	Amherst, MA	Massachusetts	27–13
76	November 4, 2022	East Hartford, CT	Connecticut	27–10
77	November 25, 2023	Amherst, MA	Connecticut	31–18
78	November 30, 2024	Amherst, MA	Connecticut	47–42
79	October 23, 2026	East Hartford, CT	Connecticut	35–16
Series: Connecticut leads 39–38–2

== Men's basketball ==
UConn–UMass men's basketball rivalry
- UConn Huskies UMass Minutemen
- Sport: Basketball
- First meeting: February 14, 1905; UMass 66, UConn 22
- Latest meeting: December 8, 2005; UConn 78, UMass 60

Statistics
- Total meetings: 108
- All-time series: UConn leads, 69–39
- Largest victory: UMass, 66–22 (1905)
- Longest win streak: UConn, 14 (1984–2003)
- Current win streak: UConn, 1 (2005–present)

=== Results ===
Connecticut victories	Massachusetts victories

No.	Date	Location	Winner	Score
1	February 14, 1905	Amherst, MA	Massachusetts	66–22
2	December 12, 1906	Storrs, CT	Massachusetts	34–27
3	January 26, 1907	Amherst, MA	Massachusetts	24–16
4	January 20, 1917	Amherst, MA	Massachusetts	33–12
5	January 5, 1918	Amherst, MA	Massachusetts	25–20
6	January 7, 1920	Amherst, MA	Connecticut	29–19
7	February 12, 1920	Amherst, MA	Massachusetts	27–22
8	January 8, 1921	Amherst, MA	Massachusetts	28–23
9	February 11, 1921	Storrs, CT	Connecticut	26–19
10	January 14, 1922	Storrs, CT	Connecticut	31–13
11	February 11, 1922	Amherst, MA	Massachusetts	30–17
12	February 6, 1924	Storrs, CT	Massachusetts	23–18
13	February 18, 1925	Amherst, MA	Massachusetts	20–18
14	February 22, 1926	Storrs, CT	Connecticut	30–26
15	January 19, 1929	Amherst, MA	Connecticut	21–13
16	January 18, 1930	Storrs, CT	Connecticut	37–23
17	February 4, 1931	Amherst, MA	Massachusetts	14–13
18	January 16, 1932	Storrs, CT	Massachusetts	33–19
19	January 21, 1933	Amherst, MA	Massachusetts	22–19
20	January 15, 1934	Storrs, CT	Massachusetts	37–31
21	January 16, 1935	Amherst, MA	Massachusetts	22–20
22	January 15, 1936	Storrs, CT	Massachusetts	58–32
23	January 13, 1937	Amherst, MA	Connecticut	41–37
24	February 19, 1938	Storrs, CT	Connecticut	60–51
25	February 18, 1939	Amherst, MA	Connecticut	58–47
26	February 17, 1940	Storrs, CT	Connecticut	65–35
27	February 19, 1941	Amherst, MA	Connecticut	57–37
28	February 18, 1942	Storrs, CT	Connecticut	46–40
29	February 16, 1943	Amherst, MA	Connecticut	78–42
30	January 16, 1947	Storrs, CT	Connecticut	73–37
31	January 15, 1948	Amherst, MA	Connecticut	58–20
32	January 12, 1949	Storrs, CT	Connecticut	80–48
33	January 11, 1950	Amherst, MA	Massachusetts	61–57
34	February 28, 1951	Storrs, CT	Connecticut	92–50
35	February 27, 1952	Amherst, MA	Connecticut	68–54
36	February 26, 1953	Storrs, CT	Connecticut	89–51
37	February 25, 1954	Amherst, MA	Connecticut	75–66
38	February 22, 1955	Storrs, CT	Connecticut	93–75
39	December 29, 1955	Waterville, ME	Connecticut	73–69
40	February 21, 1956	Amherst, MA	Massachusetts	87–85
41	February 5, 1957	Storrs, CT	Connecticut	97–71
42	February 19, 1957	Amherst, MA	Connecticut	90–77
43	December 4, 1957	Amherst, MA	Connecticut	99–57
44	February 18, 1958	Storrs, CT	Connecticut	86–72
45	December 15, 1958	Storrs, CT	Connecticut	71–67
46	February 16, 1959	Amherst, MA	Massachusetts	80–79^{OT}
47	December 15, 1959	Amherst, MA	Massachusetts	62–60
48	February 16, 1960	Storrs, CT	Connecticut	71–49
49	December 13, 1960	Storrs, CT	Connecticut	72–70
50	February 14, 1961	Amherst, MA	Massachusetts	71–54
51	December 12, 1961	Amherst, MA	Connecticut	76–65
52	February 13, 1962	Storrs, CT	Connecticut	72–56
53	December 12, 1962	Storrs, CT	Connecticut	85–61
54	February 12, 1963	Amherst, MA	Connecticut	79–66
55	December 10, 1963	Amherst, MA	Massachusetts	60–59

No.	Date	Location	Winner	Score
56	February 11, 1964	Storrs, CT	Connecticut	72–50
57	December 15, 1964	Storrs, CT	Connecticut	77–67
58	February 9, 1965	Amherst, MA	Connecticut	70–63
59	February 2, 1966	Amherst, MA	Connecticut	90–60
60	February 19, 1966	Storrs, CT	Connecticut	91–64
61	February 1, 1967	Storrs, CT	Connecticut	66–59
62	February 18, 1967	Amherst, MA	Connecticut	60–59
63	January 31, 1968	Amherst, MA	Massachusetts	65–63
64	February 17, 1968	Storrs, CT	Massachusetts	56–44
65	December 17, 1968	Storrs, CT	Massachusetts	80–66
66	February 15, 1969	Amherst, MA	Massachusetts	85–70
67	December 16, 1969	Amherst, MA	Connecticut	88–71
68	February 14, 1970	Storrs, CT	Massachusetts	71–65
69	December 15, 1970	Storrs, CT	Massachusetts	74–68
70	February 13, 1971	Amherst, MA	Massachusetts	89–67
71	December 14, 1971	Amherst, MA	Massachusetts	69–67
72	February 12, 1972	Storrs, CT	Connecticut	58–56
73	December 12, 1972	Storrs, CT	Connecticut	71–68
74	February 10, 1973	Amherst, MA	Massachusetts	83–67
75	December 11, 1973	Amherst, MA	Massachusetts	79–72
76	February 9, 1974	Storrs, CT	Connecticut	79–76^{OT}
77	February 8, 1975	Amherst, MA	Connecticut	80–76^{OT}
78	February 15, 1975	Storrs, CT	Massachusetts	76–75
79	January 31, 1976	Amherst, MA	Connecticut	72–66
80	February 7, 1976	Storrs, CT	Massachusetts	86–73
81	March 4, 1976	Springfield, MA	Connecticut	73–69
82	January 13, 1977	Storrs, CT	Massachusetts	81–80
83	January 29, 1977	Springfield, MA	Connecticut	65–64
84	December 14, 1977	Amherst, MA	Massachusetts	74–64
85	January 17, 1978	Hartford, CT	Connecticut	56–49
86	December 13, 1978	Amherst, MA	Connecticut	65–62
87	February 10, 1979	Storrs, CT	Connecticut	79–59
88	January 12, 1980	Springfield, MA	Connecticut	72–51
89	February 6, 1980	Storrs, CT	Connecticut	73–55
90	January 27, 1981	Storrs, CT	Connecticut	98–64
91	December 22, 1981	Amherst, MA	Connecticut	66–55
92	December 9, 1982	Storrs, CT	Connecticut	86–74
93	December 15, 1983	Amherst, MA	Massachusetts	67–65^{OT}
94	December 6, 1984	Storrs, CT	Connecticut	64–52
95	December 4, 1985	Amherst, MA	Connecticut	78–70^{OT}
96	November 29, 1986	Storrs, CT	Connecticut	58–54
97	November 26, 1988	Amherst, MA	Connecticut	84–61
98	January 30, 1989	Storrs, CT	Connecticut	104–75
99	January 30, 1990	Amherst, MA	Connecticut	94–75
100	December 27, 1996	Hartford, CT	Connecticut	64–61
101	December 23, 1997	Hartford, CT	Connecticut	72–55
102	December 9, 1998	Amherst, MA	Connecticut	59–54
103	November 22, 1999	Storrs, CT	Connecticut	79–65
104	December 12, 2000	Hartford, CT	Connecticut	82–67
105	December 11, 2001	Amherst, MA	Connecticut	69–59
106	December 10, 2002	Hartford, CT	Connecticut	59–48
107	December 30, 2003	Hartford, CT	Connecticut	91–67
108	December 9, 2004	Amherst, MA	Massachusetts	61–59
109	December 8, 2005	Hartford, CT	Connecticut	78–60
Series: Connecticut leads 71–38

== Men's ice hockey ==
UConn–UMass men's ice hockey rivalry
- UConn Huskies UMass Minutemen
- Sport: Hockey
- First meeting: January 7, 1929
- Latest meeting: UMass 3–3 (February 28, 2026)

Statistics
- All-time series: UMass leads, 47–19–7
- Largest victory: UMass 17–0
- Longest win streak: UMass 10
- Current win streak: UMass 2, (2025–present)

=== Results ===
Connecticut victories	Massachusetts victories

No.	Date	Location	Winner	Score
1	January 7, 1929	Storrs, CT	Massachusetts	6–0
2	February 12, 1929	Amherst, MA	Massachusetts	4–1
3	January 9, 1930	Amherst, MA	Massachusetts	5–0
4	February 10, 1930	Amherst, MA	Massachusetts	2–1
5	January 6, 1931	Amherst, MA	Massachusetts	9–0
6	January 11, 1932	Amherst, MA	Massachusetts	17–0
7	January 10, 1961	Amherst, MA	Tie	3–3
8	February 7, 1962	Amherst, MA	Massachusetts	9–2
9	February 11, 1963	Amherst, MA	Massachusetts	9–3
10	December 28, 1963	Amherst, MA	Massachusetts	6–3
11	January 7, 1964	Amherst, MA	Massachusetts	7–2
12	December 30, 1964	Burlington, VT	Connecticut	5–4^{OT}
13	January 11, 1965	Amherst, MA	Massachusetts	3–1
14	December 20, 1965	Amherst, MA	Connecticut	4–2
15	December 29, 1965	Durham, NH	Connecticut	6–5^{OT}
16	January 9, 1966	Amherst, MA	Connecticut	3–2^{OT}
17	December 27, 1966	Durham, NH	Massachusetts	7–6
18	January 7, 1967	Storrs, CT	Massachusetts	5–3
19	December 28, 1967	Durham, NH	Massachusetts	4–2
20	February 14, 1968	Amherst, MA	Connecticut	7–4
21	December 28, 1968	Burlington, VT	Massachusetts	7–3
22	February 12, 1969	Storrs, CT	Massachusetts	7–1
23	February 11, 1970	Storrs, CT	Massachusetts	3–0
24	February 10, 1971	Amherst, MA	Massachusetts	11–1
25	February 9, 1972	Storrs, CT	Massachusetts	11–2
26	February 7, 1973	Amherst, MA	Massachusetts	6–1
27	February 12, 1974	Storrs, CT	Massachusetts	7–1
28	February 12, 1975	Amherst, MA	Massachusetts	5–3
29	February 18, 1976	Storrs, CT	Massachusetts	5–2
30	December 14, 1976	Amherst, MA	Massachusetts	6–3
31	November 29, 1977	Storrs, CT	Connecticut	3–1
32	February 16, 1979	Amherst, MA	Connecticut	5–2
33	November 19, 1999	Amherst, MA	Massachusetts	7–4
34	November 16, 2000	Amherst, MA	Tie	2–2
35	November 11, 2001	Springfield, MA	Massachusetts	6–5
36	February 14, 2003	Amherst, MA	Massachusetts	8–6
37	October 9, 2003	Amherst, MA	Massachusetts	6–3

No.	Date	Location	Winner	Score
38	October 24, 2004	Amherst, MA	Connecticut	3–2^{OT}
39	November 18, 2006	Amherst, MA	Massachusetts	8–1
40	October 20, 2007	Amherst, MA	Massachusetts	4–3
41	December 5, 2008	Amherst, MA	Massachusetts	5–1
42	October 2, 2012	Amherst, MA	Massachusetts	4–1
43	December 30, 2013	Hartford, CT	Connecticut	2–1
44	January 2, 2015	Amherst, MA	Connecticut	4–3
45	February 27, 2015	Hartford, CT	Connecticut	4–0
46	November 6, 2015	Hartford, CT	Massachusetts	4–2
47	November 7, 2015	Amherst, MA	Massachusetts	5–3
48	November 4, 2016	Amherst, MA	Tie	2–2
49	December 9, 2016	Hartford, CT	Connecticut	3–1
50	December 1, 2017	Amherst, MA	Massachusetts	4–2
51	December 5, 2017	Hartford, CT	Connecticut	8–2
52	February 22, 2018	Hartford, CT	Massachusetts	3–2
53	November 30, 2018	Amherst, MA	#3 Massachusetts	7–4
54	February 21, 2019	Amherst, MA	#2 Massachusetts	3–0
55	March 8, 2019	Hartford, CT	Connecticut	4–3
56	February 28, 2020	Hartford, CT	Connecticut	3–2
57	February 29, 2020	Amherst, MA	#8 Massachusetts	4–3
58	November 20, 2020	Amherst, MA	#7 Massachusetts	5–1
59	November 21, 2020	Storrs, CT	Tie	2–2
60	December 23, 2020	Amherst, MA	#10 Massachusetts	6–2
61	February 18, 2022	Hartford, CT	#10 Massachusetts	2–1
62	February 19, 2022	Amherst, MA	#20 Connecticut	4–2
63	March 19, 2022	Boston, MA	#11 Massachusetts	2–1^{OT}
64	January 20, 2023	Amherst, MA	#13 Connecticut	4–3
65	January 21, 2023	Storrs, CT	#13 Connecticut	3–1
66	January 5, 2024	Amherst, MA	Tie	3–3
67	February 9, 2024	Storrs, CT	#12 Massachusetts	2–0
68	February 10, 2024	Amherst, MA	#12 Massachusetts	3–1
69	October 25, 2024	Amherst, MA	Tie	3–3
70	October 26, 2024	Storrs, CT	Connecticut	3–2
71	February 7, 2025	Storrs, CT	#18 Massachusetts	5–4
72	February 27, 2026	Storrs, CT	#19 Massachusetts	5–1
73	February 28, 2026	Amherst, MA	Tie	3–3
Series: Massachusetts leads 47–19–7

== See also ==
- List of NCAA college football rivalry games
