= UMass Minutemen and Minutewomen =

Intercollegiate sports teams of University of Massachusetts Amherst

- University: University of Massachusetts Amherst
- Nickname: Minutemen/Minutewomen
- NCAA: Division I (FBS)
- Conference: Mid-American (primary); Hockey East (ice hockey); A-10 (men's lacrosse); MVC (men's swimming & diving); Summit League (men's soccer)
- Athletic director: Ryan Bamford
- Location: Amherst, Massachusetts
- Varsity teams: 21 (10 men's, 11 women's)
- Football stadium: Warren McGuirk Alumni Stadium
- Basketball arena: William D. Mullins Memorial Center
- Aquatics center: Joseph R. Rogers, Jr., Pool
- Colors: Maroon and white
- Mascot: Sam the Minuteman
- Fight song: Fight Mass
- Website: umassathletics.com

Team NCAA championships
- 2

The UMass Minutemen are the athletic teams that represent the University of Massachusetts Amherst; strictly speaking, the Minutemen nickname applies to men's teams and athletes only — women's teams and athletes are known as Minutewomen. The Minutemen and Minutewomen compete in NCAA Division I sports competition primarily as members of the Mid-American Conference (MAC). The nickname is also applied to club teams that do not participate within the NCAA structure. UMass is one of only 16 universities in the nation that plays Division I FBS football and Division I men's ice hockey. (Of these, six are in the Big Ten Conference, while three-- including UMass-- are in the MAC.)

The men's football team had previously competed as a football-only member in the MAC from 2013 to 2015. The Minutemen men's soccer program will join the Summit League in 2025 as well. The Minutemen men's lacrosse program will remain an affiliate of the Atlantic 10.

== History ==
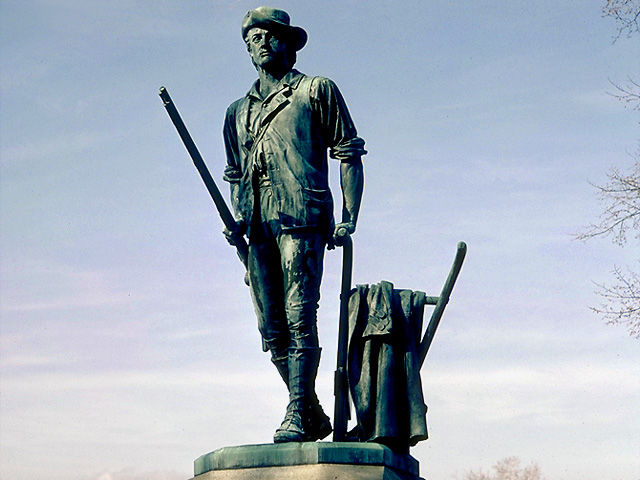
The Concord Minute Man of 1775 by Daniel Chester French, erected in 1875 in Concord, Massachusetts, depicting a typical minuteman. The statue was the basis of the school's mascot logo for many years

When athletic teams were first fielded by Massachusetts Agricultural College, the popular nickname was "Statesmen", in honor of the roles of Massachusetts statesmen in the founding of the country. Although "Aggies" was also used, by 1948 the school, which had changed its name to the University of Massachusetts the year before, decided a new nickname was in order. From the leading choices, Redmen was chosen, both for the roles Native Americans served in the history of the Commonwealth and for their "strength and fierceness in defending his lands."

However, by 1972, Native Americans in the region were calling the choice of nickname into question for the derogatory connotations of the name. The administration began requesting that the name be used as little as possible, and by the end of the 1972 spring semester, the Board of Trustees chose to change the nickname to Minutemen, one of the choices that was a finalist in 1948. The name was chosen for its ties to the history of the Commonwealth, as the Minutemen were instrumental in the early stages of the American Revolution. Though there was some controversy in the 1990s over the mascot being perceived as "a symbol of oppression," the mascot has remained the Minutemen and Minutewomen.

The school's colors are maroon and white. Its mascot is Sam the Minuteman, a colonial based on the Concord Minute Man's imagery.

== Teams ==
Men's sports	Women's sports
Baseball	Basketball
Basketball	Cross country
Cross country	Field hockey
Football	Lacrosse
Ice hockey	Rowing
Lacrosse	Soccer
Soccer	Softball
Swimming & diving	Swimming & diving
Track & Field^{1}	Tennis
	Track & Field^{1}
^{1} – includes both indoor and outdoor.

A primary member of the Atlantic 10 Conference, the University of Massachusetts sponsors teams in ten men's and eleven women's NCAA sanctioned sports, with the ice hockey program competing in the Hockey East Association and men's lacrosse in the Colonial Athletic Association.

On February 29, 2024, UMass announced it would become a full member of the Mid-American Conference starting on July 1, 2025. UMass's men's lacrosse team will remain in the A-10, while the ice hockey team will remain in the Hockey East; the MAC does not sponsor either sport.

=== Baseball ===
Initiated in 1877, the baseball team was Yankee Conference champions in 1952, 1957, 1966, 1967, 1969, 1971, 1973, 1978, 1979, and 1980, and Atlantic 10 champions in 1980, 1994, 1995, and 1996. They reached the NCAA tournament in 1954, 1955, 1956, 1966, 1967, 1969, 1971, 1973, 1978, 1995, and 1996, and the College World Series in 1954 and 1969.

Since the termination of many men's teams (including football and baseball) in 1996 at Boston University, the team has become the fourth team (in addition to the traditional Boston College, Harvard, and Northeastern) in the baseball version of the Beanpot tournament held at Fenway Park. The baseball team plays its home games at Earl Lorden Field.

UMass has had 17 players later reach the major leagues. The best known are starting pitcher Mike Flanagan, relief pitcher Jeff Reardon, shortstop Gary DiSarcina, and relief pitcher Ron Villone.

=== Basketball ===
==== Men's ====
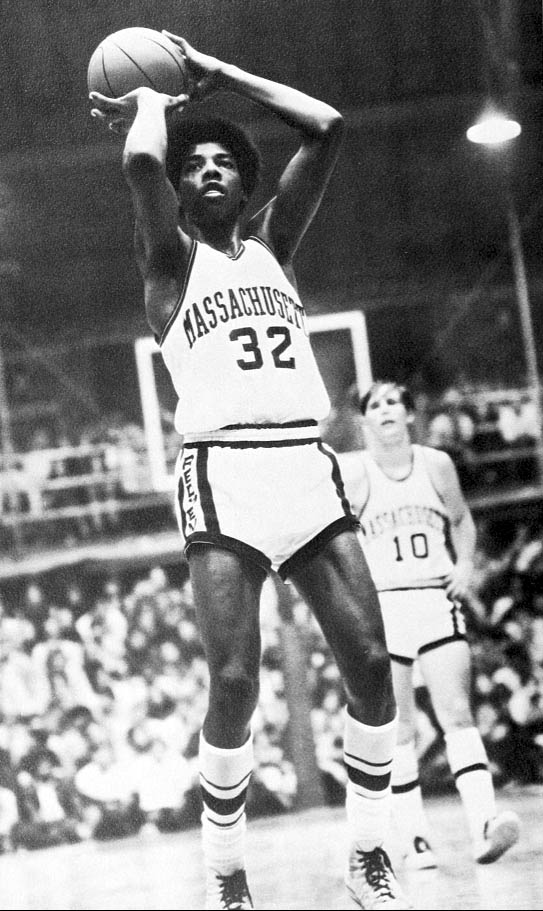
Julius Erving at UMass

UMass (Massachusetts Agricultural College) played its first varsity basketball game in 1900. UMass currently competes in the Mid-American Conference, but before 2025, the Minutemen were members of the Atlantic 10 basketball conference, of which it was regular season co-Champion in 2007. This marked the first time it won or shared the league title since the last of its five consecutive Atlantic 10 championships in 1996. During the 1990s, the men's basketball team was known as one of the finest in the nation, holding the number one ranking in national polls for extended periods. Under the leadership of then-head coach John Calipari and players such as 1996 National Player of the Year Marcus Camby, Harper Williams, and Lou Roe, the Minutemen participated in the NCAA tournament each year between 1992 and 1998, and reached the Final Four in 1996. However, a subsequent NCAA investigation found that Camby illegally accepted a total of $28,000 from sports agents that were attempting to lure him into the NBA draft after his sophomore season, and the school was forced to vacate its Final Four appearance as well as return their 1996 NCAA Final Four trophy. Camby eventually repaid the school the $151,000 in lost Final Four revenue that came as a result of the NCAA's ruling. While a Final Four banner still hangs from the rafters of the Mullins Center in defiance of the NCAA's ruling, the appearance is marked with an asterisk in official record books, even though it was noted that there was absolutely no institutional wrongdoing.

First played in 1905 and held annually since 1995 (until Boston College ended the annual game in 2012), UMass' basketball rivalry with Boston College is called the "Commonwealth Classic." Notable UMass basketball alumni include Camby, Basketball Hall of Famer Julius Erving, St. John's head coach Rick Pitino, and Boston College head coach Al Skinner.Camby, Roe, Williams, Stéphane Lasme and Gary Forbes were each named Atlantic 10 player of the year.

Derek Kellogg was a point guard for the Minutemen from 1992 to 1995. He played under John Calipari and was an assistant coach for the Memphis Tigers before becoming a head coach at his alma mater. Kellogg coached from 2008–2017.

==== Women's ====
The women's basketball program began in 1968. They have reached the Women's NIT in 1995 and the NCAA tournament in 1996 and 1998. Former players Tamara and Alisha Tatham competed for Team Canada in the 2012 Summer Olympics. Another notable player is Rashida Timbilla, who is now one of the all-time greatest players in program history. She played for Umass Amherst from 2012 to 2016. Timbilla along with Jennifer Butler were the only two players to ever reach 1,000 rebounds in Umass women's basketball history. Timbilla also was ranked among the program's top-10 lists in 14 different categories.

=== Cross country ===
==== Women's ====
The women's cross country team has won the Atlantic 10 cross country title seven times, in 1991, 1992, 1995, 1996, 1997, 1998, and 1999.

=== Field hockey ===
The field hockey program's first season was in 1975, when it quickly rose in national prominence. From 1977 to 1980, the field hockey team qualified for the AIAW national tournament, which was a precursor to the NCAA. The team has qualified for the NCAA tournament 26 times, reaching the Final Four four times (1983, 1987, 1992) and the Finals in 1981. They have been Atlantic 10 champions 16 times.

Minutewomen who have competed for Team USA in the Olympics include Judy Strong in 1980 and 1984, Patty Shea in 1988 and 1996, Megan Donnelly in 1998, and Pam Bustin in 1996. Pam Hixon was the head coach of Team USA in 1996. Hilary Rose competed on the British team in the 1996 and 2000 Olympic Games. Former UMass assistant coach Shannon Taylor competed for Team USA at the 2012 Summer Olympics, and was a member of the USA National Team in 2013.

=== Football ===
The UMass football team competed at the NCAA Division I FCS (formerly I-AA) level until 2012, and won one national title in that subdivision in 1998. The Minutemen were national finalists in 1978 and 2006. UMass has competed in four football conferences over its history, the Yankee Conference, the Atlantic 10, and the Colonial Athletic Association, which are basically three incarnations of the same conference, and now the FBS Mid-American Conference. UMass has captured a total of 22 conference championships, the most recent one being a share of the CAA title in 2007.

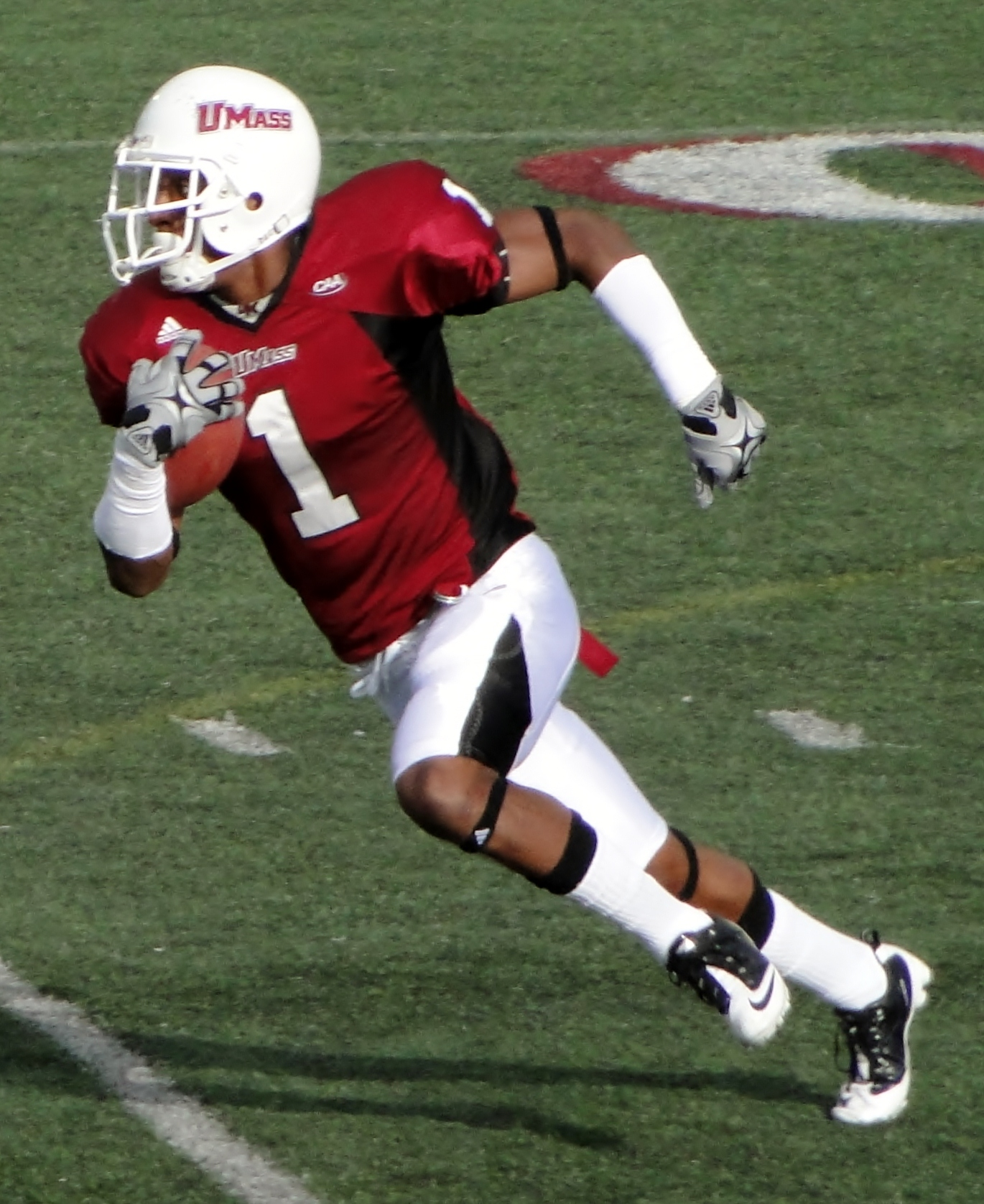
Julian Talley returns a punt versus the William & Mary Tribe at Warren McGuirk Alumni Stadium in 2010

The 2006 season was the final season under which the football team competed in the Atlantic 10, as the A-10 Football Conference disbanded after the season with all current teams moving to the CAA. They defeated Montana, 19–17, to advance to the championship game (first since 1998). UMass fell to Appalachian State in the national championship game by a score of 28–17 and finished the season with a record of 13–2.

Historically, the program has competed in three major bowl games, compiling a record of 1–2. In 1964, UMass played in the Tangerine Bowl in Orlando, Florida, losing to East Carolina, 14–13. They then played in the 1972 Boardwalk Bowl in Atlantic City, New Jersey and defeated UC Davis, 35–14, in a game played inside the Atlantic City Convention Center. Also, the 1979 Division I-AA title game was then known as the Pioneer Bowl and was played in Wichita Falls, Texas. The Minutemen fell to Florida A&M in that game by a score of 35–28.

UMass football has sent several players to the NFL. Some of their most successful players there include quarterback Greg Landry, running back Marcel Shipp, and tight end Milt Morin. Class of 2010 members that went on to the NFL include offensive lineman Vladimir Ducasse and wide receiver Victor Cruz. Cruz and safety James Ihedigbo, also a UMass product, both started Super Bowl XLVI. In the year of 2016, a former Umass minutemen Tajae Sharpe was invited to the NFL Combines, and subsequently was drafted to play in the NFL.

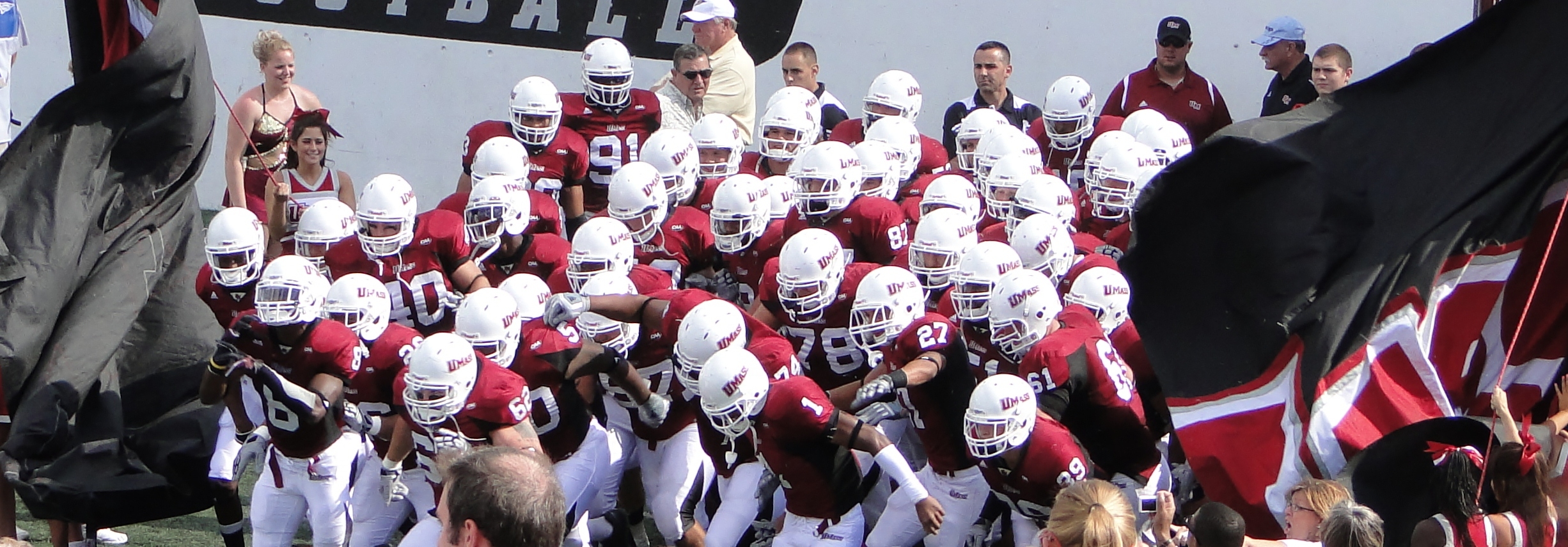
2010 UMass Minutemen Football Team

On November 30, 2010, the Boston Herald reported that the Mid-American Conference was exploring the possibility of adding the Minutemen for football. This would upgrade UMass from the FCS to the FBS. This report was later confirmed by an article in The Plain Dealer (Cleveland, Ohio), going on to report UMass will become a member of the MAC in 2012, and bowl-eligible beginning in 2013.

In April 2011, UMass confirmed that it was moving to the FBS and play in the MAC beginning with the 2012 season. The team also announced it would play its home schedule at Gillette Stadium during renovations at McGuirk Stadium, and be bowl-eligible in 2013. The 2011 team remained in the CAA Conference of the FCS. The school cited the changing landscape of the FCS, especially in the Colonial Athletic Association, with Hofstra and Northeastern dropping their football programs in 2009, Rhode Island considering a move to the lower-profile Northeast Conference, Georgia State and Old Dominion joining the CAA, and Villanova considering a move to the Football Bowl Subdivision's Big East Conference.

The football team began a move to the Football Bowl Subdivision and the Mid-American Conference in April 2011 and became a full member in 2013. In March 2014, the MAC and UMass announced an agreement for the Minutemen to leave the conference after the 2015 season due to UMass declining an offer to become a full member of the conference. In the agreement between the MAC and the university, there was a contractual clause that had UMass playing in the MAC as a football-only member for two more seasons if UMass declined a full membership offer. UMass announced that it would look for a "more suitable conference" for the team.

UMass became an independent member of FBS football beginning with the 2016 season. It rejoined the MAC as a full member in 2025.

=== Ice hockey ===
UMass ice hockey has a long history dating back to 1908. The team competed in the Eastern College Athletic Conference at the Division II level through 1979, when the program was ceased due to the absence of an on-campus facility that could support ice hockey. Ice hockey returned in 1993 with the opening of the Mullins Center, and the team began competition in 1994 at the Division I level in the Hockey East Conference. The year 1993 is considered the beginning of the "modern era" of UMass Hockey.

The program first showed steady improvement after resuming competition, with breakthrough years occurring in 2003 and 2004, when the team reached the Hockey East Tournament semifinals and finals, respectively. UMass Men's Ice Hockey appeared in their first NCAA Men's Ice Hockey tournament (16 Teams) in the 2006–07 season and won their first NCAA tournament game against Clarkson (1-0 OT) before losing to Maine (3-1) in the Regional Final. This was followed by over a decade of losing seasons, which included the firing of longtime coach Don Cahoon and the hiring and subsequent firing of head coach John Micheletto. In 2018-2019, under current coach Greg Carvel, and with the help of top recruits Cale Makar and Mario Ferraro, the Minutemen had their most successful season in team history, achieving a #1 national ranking at times during the season. Despite faltering in the Hockey East Tournament, they nevertheless qualified for the NCAA tournament and advanced to their first-ever Frozen Four in Buffalo. They defeated Denver in overtime (4-3) in the national semifinals, then fell (3-0) to national champions Minnesota Duluth. For his performance during the regular season, Makar was awarded the school's first-ever Hobey Baker Award. UMass spent the next season in the national rankings and was in line to return to the tournament the following year, but the season was cut short in March by the COVID-19 pandemic. The Minutemen won their first National Hockey Championship in the 2021 NCAA tournament, beating St. Cloud State by a score of 5–0.

UMass alumni who have played/are playing professional hockey include Cale Makar, Mario Ferraro, Conor Sheary, Jonathan Quick, Thomas Pock, Greg Mauldin, Justin Braun, and Casey Wellman, among others. Quick also won a silver medal at the 2010 Winter Olympics as a member of Team USA and the Stanley Cup and the Conn Smythe Trophy as the postseason MVP with the Los Angeles Kings during the 2012 NHL playoffs. He also was starting goalie of the Stanley Cup Champion Kings in 2014. Makar won the Calder Memorial Trophy in 2019-2020 as the NHL's most outstanding first-year player. He went on to win the Stanley Cup in the 2021-22 season, also becoming only the third defenceman to win the Norris Trophy and Conn Smythe Trophy in the same season. Sheary played for the 2015/16 Stanley Cup Champion Pittsburgh Penguins.

=== Lacrosse ===
==== Men's ====
The men's lacrosse team reached the NCAA Championship Game in 2006, where they lost to the #1 ranked and undefeated Virginia Cavaliers. UMass, unseeded in the tournament, had to defeat three seeded teams (Cornell, Hofstra, Maryland) to make it to the championship game in Philadelphia. It was the first time any team had ever defeated the #4, #3, and #2 seeded teams on its way to facing #1 Virginia in the championship.

==== Women's ====
The women's lacrosse team's first season was in 1976 where the program quickly rose to prominence. They reached the USWLA Semifinals in 1978, and were USWLA runner up in 1979. The Minutewomen reached the AIAW semifinals both in 1980 and 1981. They were NCAA Champions in 1982, and have been selected for the NCAA tournament in 1983 (semifinals), 1984 (semifinals), 2009, 2011, 2012, 2013, 2014, 2015, and 2016, and 2017. They have been Atlantic 10 Champions in 2000, 2009, 2010, 2011, 2012, 2013, 2014, 2015, 2016, and 2017.

=== Soccer ===
==== Men's ====
UMass began its men's soccer program in 1930. They have reached the NCAA tournament 4 times, in 2001, in 2007, 2008 and in 2017. In 2007 UMass Men's soccer led by Captains Junior Goalkeeper Zack Simmons, Senior Defender Kenny Cook, and Junior Midfielder Mike Desantis reached NCAA Men's College Cup. They were defeated by the Ohio State Buckeyes, 1-0. On their road to the Final Four, they first won the Atlantic 10 Tournament in Dayton, Ohio, and then went on to beat Boston University, #1 ranked Boston College, Central Connecticut State, and Illinois at Chicago. They finished the season 17-8-1, setting program records for wins and furthest advancement into the NCAA tournament. They have been Atlantic 10 champions 3 times, in 2001, 2007 and 2017. In 2017 UMass Men's soccer was the first team since 1991 Rutgers Men's soccer to win the Atlantic 10 Regular season and Conference championships outright, in the same year.

==== Women's ====
The women's soccer program began in 1978. The Minutewomen have won 4 Atlantic 10 championships (1993, 1994, 1995 and 1997). They have been selected to the NCAA tournament 15 times, reaching the Women's College Cup 6 times (1983, 1984, 1985, 1986, 1987 (finalist), and 1993). Alumnus Briana Scurry received gold medals as a member of the 1996 and 2004 Team USA Women's Soccer Teams.

=== Softball ===
The softball team has solidified itself as the top sports program at UMass over the last 30-plus years. The program was started in 1974 and in just five seasons became a national power. From 1978 to 1980 the Minutewomen softball team reached the EAIAW Tournament each year, winning it twice. In three seasons (1974, 1978 and 1980) they played in the AIAW Women's College World Series. From 1980 through the 2013 season, the team was led by head coach Elaine Sortino.

Since its conversion from the AIAW to the NCAA, UMass has played in 21 NCAA tournaments, and has made three trips to the College World Series (1992, 1997, and 1998). They have had players named as All-Americans on 32 different occasions. The team has also dominated the Atlantic 10, winning 23 conference championships. Of the notable softball alumni, one of the school's most famous is pitcher Danielle Henderson, who pitched in the 2000 Olympic Games in Sydney, Australia, and led the United States to a gold medal. Henderson also won the 1999 Honda Sports Award, given annually to the top collegiate softball player in the country. Henderson returned to her alma mater when she was named associate head coach in 2013.

In her tenure as coach of the UMass softball team Sortino won over 1,000 games. In her career, UMass posted 21 30-win seasons, seven 40-win campaign and one 50-win season.

Since 2000 the softball team has played its home games at the state-of-the-art 1,000-seat UMass Softball Complex. The facility was renamed to Sortino Field in 2012 in honor of former coach Sortino.

=== Swimming and Diving ===
==== Men's ====
The men's swimming and diving team's first season was in 1935. They have been Atlantic 10 Conference Champions 16 times- 1996, 1997, 1998, 2001, 2002, 2003, 2004, 2005, 2007, 2008, 2009, 2010, 2011, 2012, 2015, and 2016.

They have been New England Champions 8 times- 1987, 1988, 1989, 1990, 1991, 1992, 1993, and 1994.

The team scored in the NCAA Division I men's swimming and diving championships two times, finishing in 9th place in 1941 and 7th place in 1942.

==== Women's ====
The women's swimming and diving team began their program in 1976. They have been Atlantic 10 Conference Champions 1 time- 2001.

The team scored in the NCAA Division I women's swimming and diving championships two times, finishing in 30th place in 2013 and 27th place in 2014.

Diver Angelique Rodríguez competed on the Puerto Rican Olympic teams in the 2000 and 2004 Summer Olympics. Although UMass did not have a women's swimming and diving team at the time, Dorothy Donnelly practiced with the men's team in the late 1930s and early 1940s. She competed on the USA swimming team in the 1940 Summer Olympics.

=== Other sports ===
The women's rowing program has been highly successful. The team has been 16 time A-10 champions, and some team members have been selected to the U.S. National Team, including Sara Jones who competed in the 2000 and 2004 Summer Olympics. The team won 4th place in the 1998 NCAA Championships. UMass alumnus Julia Richter won the silver medal at the 2012 London Summer Olympics for Team Germany as a member of that country's women's four. Head coach Jim Dietz coached the 1988, 1992 and 2000 Olympic teams and was a member of the 1972, 1976, and 1980 Olympic teams. The women's tennis team were A-10 champions in 2001 and 2017, and New England Champions in 1996.

=== Former sports ===
In May 1984, the Athletic Department decided to discontinue funding seven varsity sports. These sports were men's and women's tennis, golf, skiing and men's wrestling. It was decided to cut the funding because the money available to them was not enough to keep them on a truly competitive level. The money saved was to be used to make other sports stronger. Posters saying, "SOS: Save Our Sports," appeared all over campus. Men's and women's tennis ultimately survived, for a few years at least.

Before being eliminated after the 2002 academic year, UMass had highly successful varsity programs in men's water polo (4th place national finish in 1995, with 6 appearances in NCAA tournaments), women's water polo, men's and women's gymnastics, men's tennis and women's volleyball. Before being eliminated as a varsity sport after the 2009 season, the 2008 Minutemen skiing team won the United States Collegiate Skiing and Snowboard Association National Championship (the first time in 23 years an Eastern Coast team had won). Many of the eliminated varsity sports programs continue at the club sports level.

== Championships ==
=== NCAA team championships ===
Massachusetts has won 2 NCAA team national championships.

- Men's (1)
  - Ice Hockey (1): 2021
- Women's (1)
  - Lacrosse (1): 1982

== Pageantry ==
Mascot: Sam the Minuteman
Outfitter: Adidas (Under Armour - Starting in 2027)
Marching band: University of Massachusetts Minuteman Marching Band, known as " The Power and Class of New England"
Fight songs: "Fight Mass"

== See also ==
- List of college athletic programs in Massachusetts
