= Willie Byrd =

American gridiron football player (born 1983)

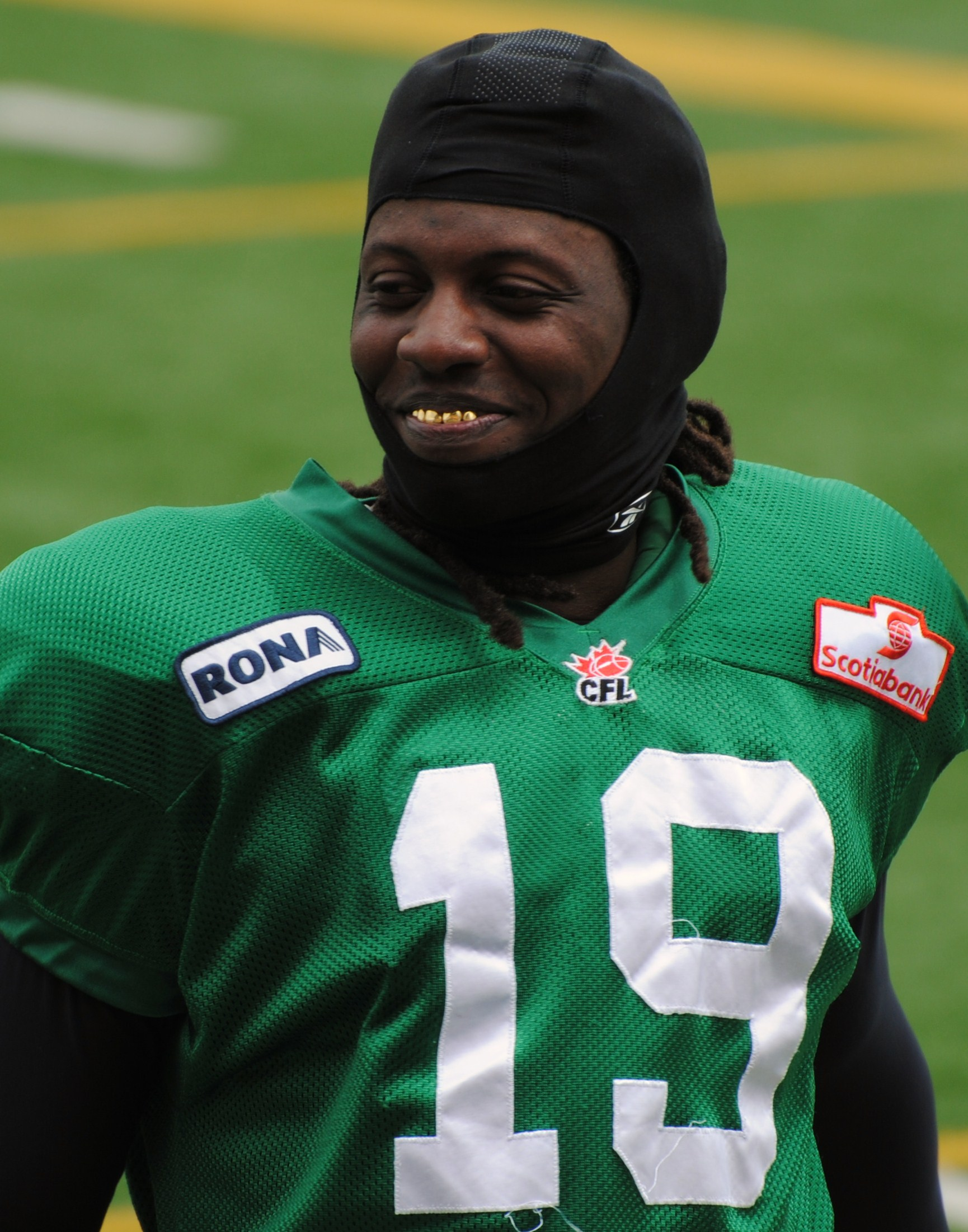
- Byrd with the Saskatchewan Roughriders in 2010

No. 19
- Position: Defensive back

Personal information
- Born: July 19, 1983 (age 43); Boynton Beach, FL
- Listed height: 6 ft 3 in (1.91 m)
- Listed weight: 198 lb (90 kg)

Career information
- College: Miles

Career history
- 2008: Calgary Stampeders
- 2008: Winnipeg Blue Bombers
- 2010: Saskatchewan Roughriders
- Stats at CFL.ca (archive)

Willie Byrd is an American former professional football player who was a defensive back in the Canadian Football League (CFL). He played college football at four different schools (William Penn, Garden City Community College, North Dakota State and Miles College). Byrd played in the CFL for the Winnipeg Blue Bombers, Calgary Stampeders and Saskatchewan Roughriders, spending most of his time on special teams.
