= UMass Minutemen cross country =

American college cross country team

- University: University of Massachusetts Amherst
- Conference: MAC
- Location: Amherst, Massachusetts, US
- Nickname: Minutemen
- Colors: Maroon and white

NCAA Championship appearances
- 1968, 1973, 1974, 1977, 1978

Conference champions
- A-10: 1995, 2008, 2024

The UMass Minutemen men's cross country team represents the University of Massachusetts Amherst in the Mid-American Conference in NCAA Division I cross country running.

== History ==
UMass men's cross country has won the Yankee Conference cross country title sixteen times, the Atlantic 10 title three times, and the IC4A title two times.

The Minutemen have participated five times as a team in the NCAA Division I men's cross country championships with appearances in 1968, 1973, 1974, 1977, and 1978. The team's best finish was 8th place in the 1974 NCAA Division I cross country championships. Individual competitors represented the Minutemen at the 1963, 1987, and 1988 championships.

The Minutemen competed in the Yankee Conference from 1948 until 1979 where they captured the conference title a record sixteen times. UMass won its first Yankee Conference crown in 1951 under coach Llewelyn Derby. They would repeat this feat the next two seasons as well. Under coach William Footrick, UMass would win four more times in 1960, 1961, 1962, and 1966. From 1970 to 1978 The Minutemen would claim an unprecedented nine straight championships under the leadership of coach Ken O’Brien. In this time the Minutemen also won two IC4A titles, 1973 and 1977.

UMass cross country joined the A-10 in 1980 and won its first Atlantic 10 cross country title in 1995 under head coach Ken O'Brien. O'Brien was named A-10 Coach of the Year for the 1995 season.

In 2008, the Minutemen won the 2008 Atlantic 10 championships in Charlotte, North Carolina by one point over Duquesne University. Ken O'Brien was named A-10 Coach of the Year for the 2008 season.

In 2024, UMass won its first Atlantic 10 championship since 2008. Head coach Tim Ritchie was named the 2024 Atlantic 10 Coach of the Year. In the 2024 championship meet, the Minutemen scored a 36 with Loyola Chicago coming in second place with a score of 50.

== Notable alumni ==
=== Cross Country All-Americans ===
- Stetson Arnold (1977)
- Michael Quinn (1977)
- Michael Quinn (1976)
- John McGrail (1975)
- William Gillin (1974)
- Randy Thomas (1974)

=== UMass Athletics Hall of Fame ===
- Ken O'Brien '63
- Bob Horn '55
- Ron Wayne '71
- Randy Thomas '75
