= Casey McGahee =

American gridiron football player (born 1983)

Profile
- Position: Wide receiver

Personal information
- Born: December 7, 1983 (age 42); Fort Myers, Florida, U.S.
- Listed height: 5 ft 9 in (1.75 m)
- Listed weight: 160 lb (73 kg)

Career information
- College: Florida Atlantic
- CFL draft: 2008: undrafted

Career history
- 2008: Winnipeg Blue Bombers
- 2009: Saskatchewan Roughriders*
- * Offseason or practice squad member only
- Stats at CFL.ca

Casey McGahee (born December 7, 1983) is an American former professional football wide receiver. He was signed by the Winnipeg Blue Bombers as an undrafted free agent in 2008. He played college football at Florida Atlantic.

McGahee was also a member of the Saskatchewan Roughriders.
