= McGahey =

McGahey is a surname of Irish origin derived from "Mac Eachaidh", meaning "son of Aghy".

Notable people with the surname include:

- Charlie McGahey (1871–1935), English cricketer
- Harrison McGahey (born 1995), English footballer
- Jeanne McGahey, American poet
- John McGahey (born 1960), Irish Gaelic player
- Mick McGahey (1925–1999), Scottish miner and Communist
- Susan McGahey (1862–1919), Irish-born Australian matron of Royal Prince Alfred Hospital

== See also ==
- McGaheysville, Virginia
