= Sam the Minuteman =

Mascot of the University of Massachusetts Amherst

- University: University of Massachusetts Amherst
- Conference: Mid-American Conference
- Description: A caricature of a minuteman
- First seen: 1972

Sam the Minuteman is the mascot of the University of Massachusetts Amherst, representing the University and its athletic teams on campus and in the community. Sam is also integral in the operation of the marching band.

Sam placed second in the 2005 Capital One Mascot Of The Year competition, behind Nebraska's Herbie Husker. Sam has also finished in the top ten at the National Cheerleading Association's Mascot Nationals for the last four years. He was also named the Mascot of the Month by Playboy.com in October 2005.

Sam was featured in a This is SportsCenter commercial, knocking a tennis ball away from Andy Roddick, presumably from frustration over the sound of the ball hitting the racket.

Sam was also featured in a SportsCenter commercial in August 2009 involving the team status of NFL quarterback Brett Favre where Sam is shown holding either one or two lamps, to indicate his status as retired or not. The commercial was a play on the Henry Wadsworth Longfellow poem, Paul Revere's Ride.
