= Ryan Bamford =

American college athletics administrator

Current position
- Title: Athletic director
- Team: UMass
- Conference: Mid-American Conference

Playing career
- 1996–2000: Ithaca College
- Position: Guard

Administrative career (AD unless noted)
- 2003–2005: Yale (assistant AD)
- 2006: Yale (associate AD)
- 2007–2011: Yale (senior associate AD)
- 2011–2015: Georgia Tech (senior associate AD)
- 2015–present: UMass

Ryan Bamford is the current athletic director of the University of Massachusetts Amherst. Bamford previously served at Georgia Institute of Technology as associate athletic director and Yale University as senior associate director of athletics for varsity sports administration.

== Family and education ==
Bamford's father, Steve Bamford, is a long-time college athletics administrator. He served as director of athletics at Plymouth State University in Plymouth, New Hampshire for 13 years before joining the Eastern College Athletic Conference in 2000 as an assistant commissioner. The elder Bamford most recently served as the conference's interim commissioner, a post he was appointed to twice in his last five years prior to a 2013 retirement. Bamford attended Ithaca College and was a guard on the basketball team. He left Ithaca as a 1,000-point scorer (13th all-time) and all-time leader in single-season and career three-point field goals. He earned a degree in Sport Management in 2000, and added a Master's degree in athletic administration from Springfield College in 2003.

== Early career ==
Bamford worked in the athletic department at Springfield College (2000–02) as a graduate fellow. He has also previously held positions with the Eastern College Athletic Conference (ECAC), Octagon Sports Marketing, Plymouth State and the University of New Hampshire.

== Yale University ==
Bamford was hired at Yale University as an assistant athletic director in 2003. He was promoted to associate athletic director in 2006 and then senior associate director of athletics in 2007. He left the department as the lead administrator for internal operations.

During his time at Yale, he oversaw the football, men's basketball, and men's and women's fencing programs. In addition, he supervised Yale's varsity support service units of sports medicine, equipment operations and strength and conditioning, as well as all intercollegiate scheduling, event management, and postseason championships for the 35-sport department.

Bamford served on a number of NCAA and Ivy League committees, including four years on the NCAA Division I Women's Lacrosse Committee, which he chaired from 2009 to 2010. As part of the administration at Yale, Bamford was responsible for successful new parking regulations for the annual Harvard-Yale football rivalry game, as well as dealing with student pranks associated with the rivalry.

== Georgia Tech ==
Bamford was hired on March 23, 2011 as an associate athletic director at by then athletic director Dan Radakovich and promoted to senior associate in June 2013 by incoming athletic director Mike Bobinski.

As senior associate director of athletics at Georgia Tech from 2011-2015, Bamford had direct oversight of all internal operations and supervision of the football, men's basketball and baseball programs. In 2011, he assisted athletic director Dan Radakovich in the search process for a men's basketball coach. On March 28, 2011, the Jackets hired Brian Gregory as the 13th head coach in program history. Bamford oversaw scheduling for both Georgia Tech Yellow Jackets football and Georgia Tech Yellow Jackets men's basketball and was involved in a January 2014 incident when Tulane University attempted to cancel a series against Georgia Tech, including a home game scheduled for September 6, 2014. Later that evening, Tulane reversed the decision. Bamford shared his thoughts on his time at Georgia Tech with Atlanta Journal-Constitution beat-writer Ken Seguira prior to leaving the Flats for UMass.

== University of Massachusetts ==
Named director of athletics in March 2015, Bamford was given direct oversight of a 21-sport athletic department with 650 student-athletes, 175 employees and a $33m budget. In his first six months at UMass, Bamford generated interest and visibility for the athletics program by announcing the department would fund the Cost of Attendance gap for its scholarship student-athletes. In addition, Bamford was initially lauded for his transparency and fan-friendly approach in interviews, on social media and in person. More recently, critics have questioned whether Bamford will ever be successful in his undertaking of bringing respectability to UMass football.

=== Calipari celebrations ===
In December 2015, Bamford and his department came under fire in a column by The Boston Globe columnist Dan Shaugnessy for honoring former men's basketball coach John Calipari with a fundraising event in Boston and a banner-raising ceremony in the Mullins Center. However, after the two-day celebration, many sources concluded the events were a huge success for UMass in generating interest around a golden era of Minutemen basketball.

=== UMass in Football Bowl Subdivision ===
Bamford has often answered questions about the football program's move from the Football Championship Subdivision (FCS) to FBS and leaving the Mid-American Conference for FBS Independent status in 2016, a decision that was made in 2013. After only four years, The Boston Globe published an article on the University's lack of progress as a Football Bowl Subdivision member school with Bamford saying, "I didn't come here to fail." Bamford has been widely recognized for his ability to schedule football opponents for UMass as they start independent status in 2016. When Bamford arrived at UMass in April 2015, the Minutemen had only one FBS home game scheduled for the 2016 season. By August, UMass announced 5 home games and in November the addition of a sixth home game (Boston College). Perhaps one of his greatest accomplishments is producing eight football games in eight years (from 2016-2024) with regional rivals Boston College and UConn.
