= Fight Mass =

UMass fight song

Fight Mass is the fight song of the University of Massachusetts Amherst. It was written by Captain Edwin Sumner, a military instructor in the spring of 1930. It is performed at home games and other events by the University of Massachusetts Minuteman Marching Band.

== Lyrics ==
Fight, fi-i-ight Massachusetts,
Fight, fi-i-ight every play,
Fight, fi-i-ight for a touchdown,
Fight all your might today.

Fight down the field Massachusetts,
The stars and the stripes will gleam,
Fi-i-ght, Fi-i-ght for old Bay State,
Fight for the team, team, team.
