= William Cook (entrepreneur) =

American businessman (1931–2011)

- Born: January 27, 1931; Mattoon, Illinois, US
- Died: April 15, 2011 (aged 80); Bloomington, Indiana, US
- Education: Northwestern University
- Occupations: Business executive, philanthropist
- Spouse: Gayle Cook
- Children: Carl Cook

William Alfred Cook (January 27, 1931 – April 15, 2011) was an American entrepreneur, philanthropist and historic preservationist, co-founded the medical equipment manufacturer Cook Group with his wife Gayle Cook in 1963. He resided in Bloomington, Indiana, and was one of America's wealthiest men.

== Biography ==
Cook was born in Mattoon, Illinois, and he grew up and graduated from high school in Canton, Illinois where he was a letterman in football, basketball, and track. He majored in biology at Northwestern University where he joined Beta Theta Pi fraternity and graduated in 1953. He had planned to go on to medical school, but was drafted into the army, where he served his two-year stint as a surgical technician. Bill married Gayle Karch in 1957, and they had a son (now CEO of the Cook Group), Carl, in 1962. In 1963, the Cook family moved to Bloomington, Indiana, where they started the company in their apartment that was eventually to become the Cook Group. For his many contributions to society, Cook was honored with honorary degrees from Northwestern University, Indiana University, Rose-Hulman Institute of Technology, Marian College (now Marian University), and Vincennes University.

== Cook Group ==
Initially making medical devices, including guidewires for catheter angiography, Bill Cook and his wife Gayle started Cook Group in a spare bedroom in their Bloomington, Indiana apartment in 1963. They collaborated with many of the founders of Interventional Radiology, including Dr. Charles Dotter, to grow Cook, Inc. into the world's largest family-owned medical device manufacturer. Notable products included the Spectrum antibiotic-impregnated catheter (Rifamphin/Minocycline); the Gianturco-Roubin coronary stent, the first coronary stent approved for use in the USA; the first paclitaxel-coated drug-eluting stent, the Supra-G, tested in Asia; and the V-Flex, tested in Europe.

== Historic preservation ==
Cook and his wife Gayle took an interest in historic preservation projects as business ventures. The Cook Group led a revitalization of downtown Bloomington, Indiana, culminating in the grand opening of Fountain Square Mall in 1988. The most notable project has been the restoration of the West Baden Springs Hotel in partnership with Indiana Landmarks. This project led Cook to take on the development of the French Lick Resort Casino project in Orange County, Indiana. In June 2007, Indiana Landmarks unveiled an award, to be called the "Cook Cup," for outstanding individual contributions to historic preservation in Indiana. Also in 2007 Bill, his wife Gayle and son Carl provided the funds to restore Beck's Mill at Salem, Indiana. In April, 2010, Indiana Landmarks announced a $7-million pledge from the Cooks to restore the former Central Avenue Methodist Church in Indianapolis as a performance venue and new state headquarters for Landmarks now known as the Indiana Landmarks Center. From early 2009 he worked to build up and preserve the downtown area of his hometown, Canton, Illinois, also building a factory and new hotel there, with plans to build a second factory.

== Star of Indiana and Blast! ==
In 1985, Bill Cook began a drum & bugle corps known as the Star of Indiana. He not only provided the $1 million in seed money necessary to start the corps, but he also often helped drive the coach buses that transported the corps around the U.S. and Canada on summer tour. Unlike most drum corps, Star of Indiana was run as a business venture, and, in that respect, served as a model for the corps that remain in active competition today. Star of Indiana made DCI finals in every year of competition, and won the Drum Corps International Division I World Championship in 1991 and placed no lower than third from 1990 onwards. After the 1993 season, Cook and Star of Indiana left DCI and began touring as Brass Theater before debuting the show Blast! at the London Apollo Theatre in Hammersmith. The show opened in the United States in 2000 and moved to Broadway in 2001. It won the 2001 Tony Award for "Best Special Theatrical Event" and also won the 2001 Emmy Award for "Best Choreography."

== Indiana University ==
Although a graduate of Northwestern University, Bill Cook developed an attachment to Indiana University (IU), located in his adopted hometown of Bloomington. Cook and his wife, Gayle, were ardent supporters of IU's Jacobs School of Music and the school's renowned music library is named in their honor. In 1996, the Cooks designated a $1 million gift to honor IU Foundation President Bill Armstrong and his wife, Martha Lea; this gift was used to fund the Martha Lea and Bill Armstrong Teacher Educators, which allows a group of Indiana public school teachers to advance their professional development by working with IU faculty and education students. In 2010, IU's Kelley School of Business presented the Cooks with the William L. Haeberle Entrepreneurial Legacy Award, which the school bestows upon "...Hoosiers who represent the very best in entrepreneurship." The Cook Group donated $15 million to IU Athletics, which was primarily used for the enhancement of the basketball development center, named "Cook Hall" at its dedication in 2010. Over the years and for many purposes, the Cooks donated more than $45 million to the university, which Bill Cook also served as a trustee from 1995 to 1998.

== Wealth ==
Bill Cook was the richest man in the state of Indiana. In 2008, he was worth around $5 billion, according to the Forbes 400. In September 2010, Cook was ranked No. 101 on the Forbes 400 list of the wealthiest Americans. His wealth was estimated at $3.1 billion.
