= William and Gayle Cook Music Library =

University music library in the United States

Coordinates: 39.1649°N 86.5174°W

- Location: Bloomington, Indiana, United States
- Established: 1918, 1921

Collection
- Size: Over 700,000 cataloged items

The William and Gayle Cook Music Library, recognized as one of the largest academic music libraries in the world, serves the Jacobs School of Music and the Bloomington Campus of Indiana University. It occupies a four-floor, 55,000 square-foot facility in a wing of the Simon Music Center. The collection comprises over 700,000 cataloged items, in addition to thousands more items that have yet to be cataloged.

The library holds many special collections, including audio and print collections. One notable collection contains items from Leonard Bernstein's composition studio, including items such as clothing, furniture, recordings, books, and awards. Many such collections are housed within the library's climate-controlled vault and are accessible upon request.

The origins of the William and Gayle Cook Music Library began in 1918 and was cultivated by Charles Campbell, the head of Indiana University's Music Department. The collection grew from a few scores and books in Campbell's office into one of the largest music libraries in the world, holding hundreds of thousands of physical books, scores and recordings, in addition to providing access to numerous online databases.

In 1939, the university hired its first full-time music librarian, Ethel Louise Lyman. Under Lyman's purview, the library grew immensely. By the time she retired in 1960, the collection included 35,000 books, 12,000 recordings, and over 137,000 pieces of printed music.

The library has its own individualized system of organizing audiovisual materials. This classification system, the De Lerma system, was created in the 1960s by the head of the music library at the time, Dominique-René de Lerma. The system is still in use today and keeps music together by composer, subdivided by musical genre.
