= Jason Sturgeon =

American singer-songwriter

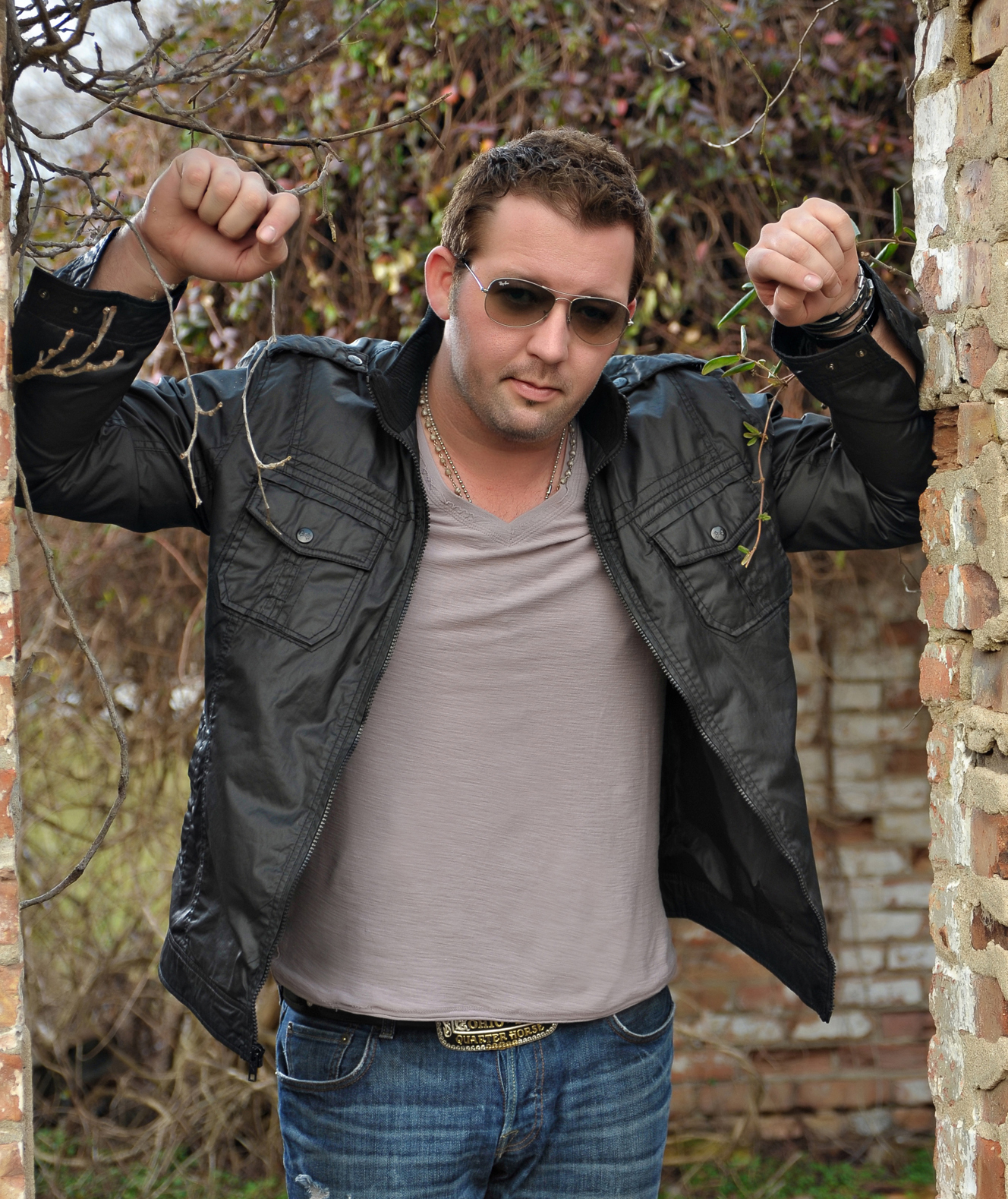
- Sturgeon in 2012

Background information
- Born: Petersburg, Indiana, U.S.
- Genres: Country
- Occupation: Singer
- Instruments: Vocals, guitar
- Years active: 2008–present
- Labels: Toolpusher Records
- Website: jasonsturgeonmusic.com

Jason Sturgeon is an American country music artist born in Petersburg, Indiana northeast of Evansville and he grew up there. He released two albums via Toolpusher Records.

== Background and education ==
Sturgeon grew up in a family of coal miners, oilmen, and farmers. He has a love for the outdoors. In addition to music, he enjoyed being a jockey, as his maternal grandparents owned thoroughbreds. He eventually began racing in AQHA open horse shows and placed 8th in the World Championship Show in Oklahoma City and 4th in the Quarter Horse Congress in Columbus, Ohio. During the summers when he was 15 to 19, he worked in the oilfields for his family and learned to build, renovate, and do anything that needed to be done around the farm. He enjoys listening to George Strait, Kenny Rogers, Godsmack, and Rage Against the Machine.

After high school Sturgeon planned to move to Nashville but his father convinced him to first attend college at Vincennes University in Vincennes, Indiana southwest of Terre Haute, and learn a trade just in case it would be needed. He earned his degrees and became a medical device engineer for Cook Medical in Bloomington, Indiana.

After graduating from Vincennes University, he moved to Nashville to pursue his music career. Soon afterwards, he began touring, spending the majority of the next two years touring. His rapid city-to-city lifestyle inspired a hit song, "Time Bomb," about seeming to always be at a different venue in a different state. While he loved being on the road, he realized that he needed to settle down. He had plenty of experiences of which to write. In 2012, Sturgeon played over 200 shows and in 2013, he was expected to have more than that. During 2012, he opened for Gary Allan, Brooks & Dunn, Rodney Atkins, Luke Bryan, and Dierks Bentley among others.

== Career ==
Sturgeon and Red Eye Max, his band, opened for Brooks & Dunn, Rodney Atkins, Luke Bryan, and others who were in town. They released a CD in 2008. Tapped to be part of Kenny Chesney’s “Next Big Star” competition, Sturgeon continued as a solo act. He traveled to Nashville but returned to Indiana until he received a phone call from Dane Clark, a member of John Mellencamp’s band. Sturgeon released That's Me in 2010. Cornfields & Coal followed in September 2013.

== Discography ==
=== Studio albums ===
Title	Details
That's Me	Release date: May 18, 2010; Label: Toolpusher Records; Formats: CD
Cornfields & Coal	Release date: September 10, 2013; Label: Toolpusher Records; Formats: CD

=== Singles ===
Year	Single	Album
2010	"Simple Life"	That's Me
2010	"Rollin' On"	That's Me
2011	"The Cover"	That's Me
2012	"Time Bomb"	Cornfields & Coal
2013	"Angel Eyes"	Cornfields & Coal

=== Music videos ===
Year	Video	Director
2010	"Simple Life"	Flick Wiltshire
2010	"Rollin' On"	Flick Wiltshire
2011	"The Cover"	Flick Wiltshire
2012	"Time Bomb"	Flick Wiltshire
2013	"Angel Eyes"	Wiltshire/Young
