= George N. Parks Drum Major Academy =

Nationwide summer academy for drums

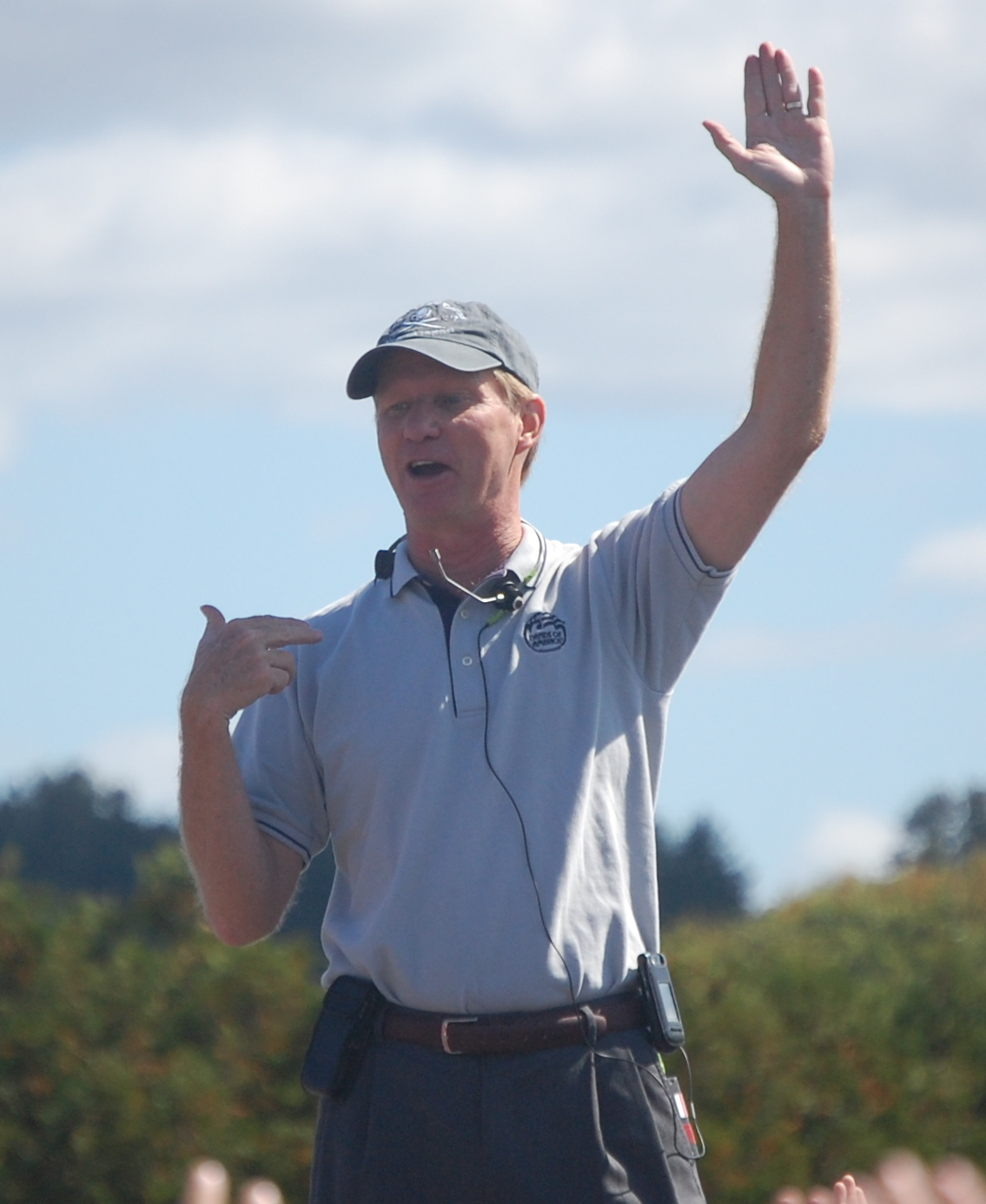
George N. Parks at Band Day in 2009

The George N. Parks Drum Major Academy is a nationwide summer academy for high school drum majors and majorettes. It was founded in 1978 by George N. Parks.

Held at various locations around the United States, by 2010 the academy drew up to 3,000 students each year. Since its inception, nearly 70,000 high school and college students have attended its summer programs and received instruction on how to be more effective drum majors and student leaders.

== Background ==
George Parks, a standout drum major in high school, began teaching drum majoring when he attended a drum major workshop at West Chester University in 1971. He served for the next two years as a volunteer assistant to Dennis Rhoades in this program. In 1973, after becoming a student at West Chester, Parks was officially hired as a staff member in the program and two years later he was promoted to head clinician.

== History ==
In 1977, Parks was hired to direct the marching band at the University of Massachusetts Amherst. In 1978, he formed the George N. Parks Drum Major Academy, based at nearby Hampshire College.

== Curriculum ==
Although non-drum majors are allowed to attend and work on non-conducting skills, the focus of the academy is to allow for the teaching of the following skills to students: Conducting instruction/evaluation, teaching techniques, and leadership and communication techniques. Reading of George's book, The Dynamic Drum Major is also required for all participants in the drum major section. Non drum major students such as color guard, section leaders, and percussion students also have classes suited just for them.

Percussion students may attend Thom Hannum's Mobile Percussion Seminar, which is taught by Thom Hannum.

== Drum Major Academy Curriculum ==
The academy has three sets of curriculum:

1. Conducting Instruction/Evaluation
2. Teaching Techniques
3. Leadership and Communication Techniques

== Current academy ==
In the summer of 2014 the academy was taught at these locations:

- University of Alabama
- Eastern Kentucky University
- University of Central Florida
- Texas A&M International University
- University of Northern Colorado
- North Central College
- Texas Woman's University
- Kutztown University of Pennsylvania (hosted by Vivace Productions Inc.)
- Ohio Wesleyan University
- University of North Carolina
- University of California, Riverside
- West Chester University (Hosted by Vivace Productions Inc.)
- University of Massachusetts Amherst (home campus)

As the academy grew, Parks was not able to attend all of the locations each summer. He always attended the sessions at the Academy's home base at the University of Massachusetts. Parks died unexpectedly on September 16, 2010. Parks' wife Jeanne issued a statement implying that the Drum Major Academy would continue after her husband's death.
