= Thom Hannum =

American drummer

Thomas P. Hannum
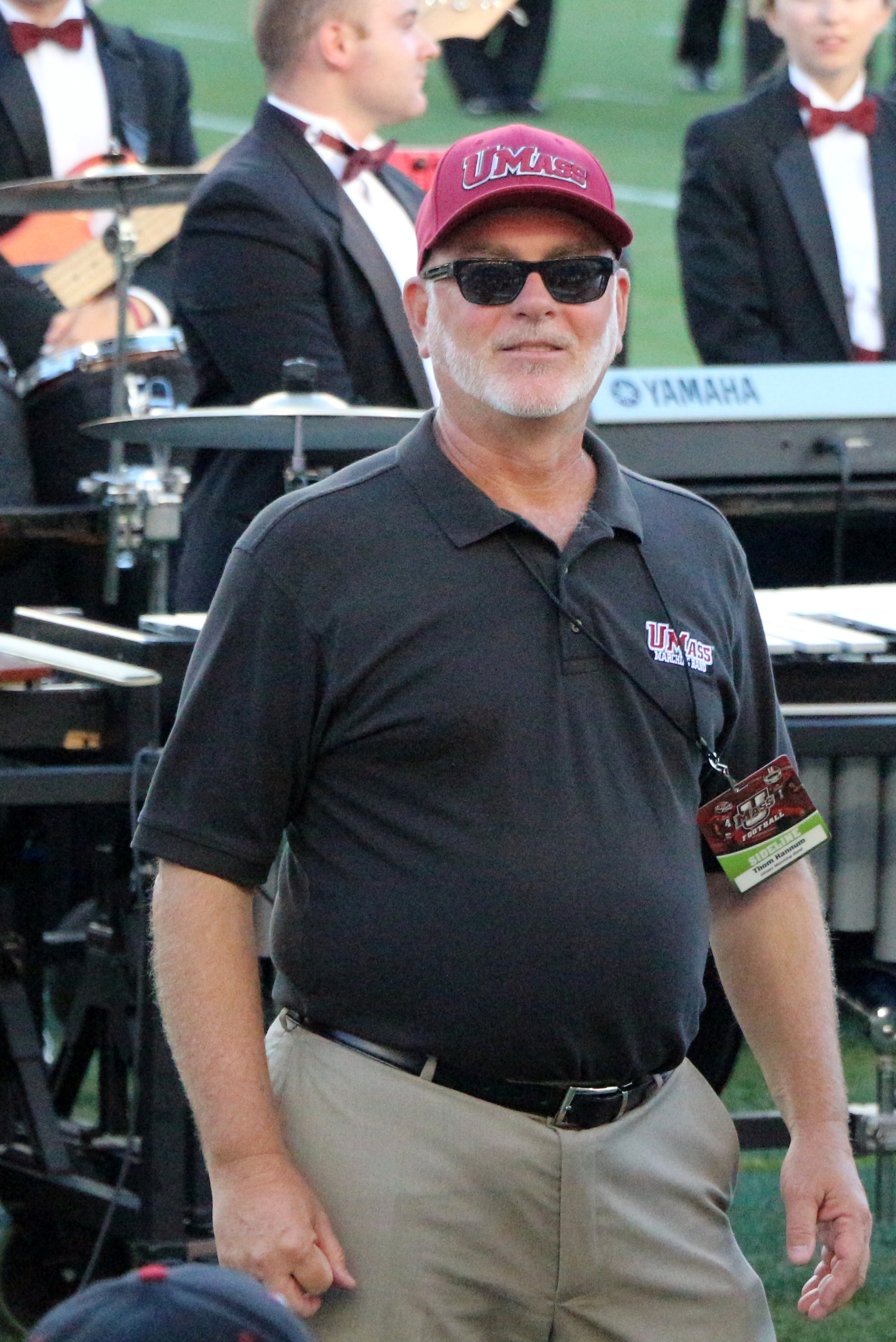
- Born: Thomas Patrick Hannum; June 14, 1957; West Chester, Pennsylvania, U.S.
- Education: West Chester University; University of Massachusetts Amherst
- Years active: 1980–present
- Awards: Drum Corps International Hall of Fame; World Drum Corps Hall of Fame; Bands of America Hall of Fame; Percussive Arts Society Hall of Fame

Thomas Patrick "Thom" Hannum (born June 14, 1957) is an American percussionist and music educator, known for being the former associate director of the University of Massachusetts Minuteman Marching Band. He previously served as interim director after the sudden death of bandleader George N. Parks while the Minuteman Band was on a trip to Michigan, and served in this position until 2011, when Timothy Todd Anderson was named the new director.

Hannum has long been regarded as one of the nation’s foremost marching percussion arrangers, instructors, and clinicians having presented numerous seminars and workshops.

== Early life ==
Hannum grew up in the Philadelphia area of Pennsylvania. When Hannum was 10, he began to play the drums with the Brookhaven Crusaders, a local drum corps located in the suburbs of Philadelphia. He continued to play throughout high school and joined the marching band at West Chester University where he studied history and secondary education.

In 1980, George N. Parks asked him to become a graduate assistant at University of Massachusetts Amherst. Hannum decided that he “had nothing to lose and everything to gain” and accepted the position. He received his master's degree from UMass in 1984 and was offered a newly created assistant director position with the band.

== Career ==
Hannum taught at the University of Massachusetts for over 40 years, where he served as the Associate Director of the Minuteman Marching Band. In early 2020, he announced he would be switching to a part time role within the UMass Marching band. Hannum stated "after a great deal of thought and careful consideration the time has come for me to scale back my activities and the time spent with the Minuteman Marching Band and other associated duties". In late May 2021, alumnus Ian Hale was announced the new Associate Director and head of percussion of the Minuteman Marching Band, replacing Hannum after 40 years.

Hannum has been heavily involved in Drum Corps International where he is currently a percussion consultant for the Boston Crusaders Drum and Bugle Corps. He is also known for his work with The Cadets Drum and Bugle Corps, Star of Indiana Drum and Bugle Corps, Crossmen Drum and Bugle Corps, and Carolina Crown Drum and Bugle Corps.

In the summer of 2001, Hannum was inducted into the Drum Corps International Hall of Fame, and in 2008 he was inducted into the World Drum Corps Hall of Fame. In 2019, he was awarded the Distinguished Service to Music Medal, the highest available honor from music fraternity Kappa Kappa Psi.

In 2024, he was inducted into the Percussive Arts Society Hall of Fame. In addition to his involvement in the marching arts, Hannum was on the design team for the Tony and Emmy winning musical, Blast!

Thom Hannum University of Massachusetts Minuteman Marching Band
Preceded by George N. Parks	Band Director; 2010-2011	Succeeded by Timothy Todd Anderson
