= Carolina Crown Drum and Bugle Corps =

Junior drum and bugle corps based in Fort Mill, South Carolina

Carolina Crown
- Location: Fort Mill, South Carolina
- Division: World Class
- Founded: 1988
- Director: Joe Roach
- Championship titles: DCI Open Class: 1993; DCI World Class: 2013
- Website: www.carolinacrown.org

Carolina Crown Drum and Bugle Corps is a World Class competitive junior drum and bugle corps. Based in Fort Mill, South Carolina, Carolina Crown is a member corps of Drum Corps International (DCI). Carolina Crown won the 2013 Drum Corps International World Class Championship, the first former Open Class/Division II corps to do so.

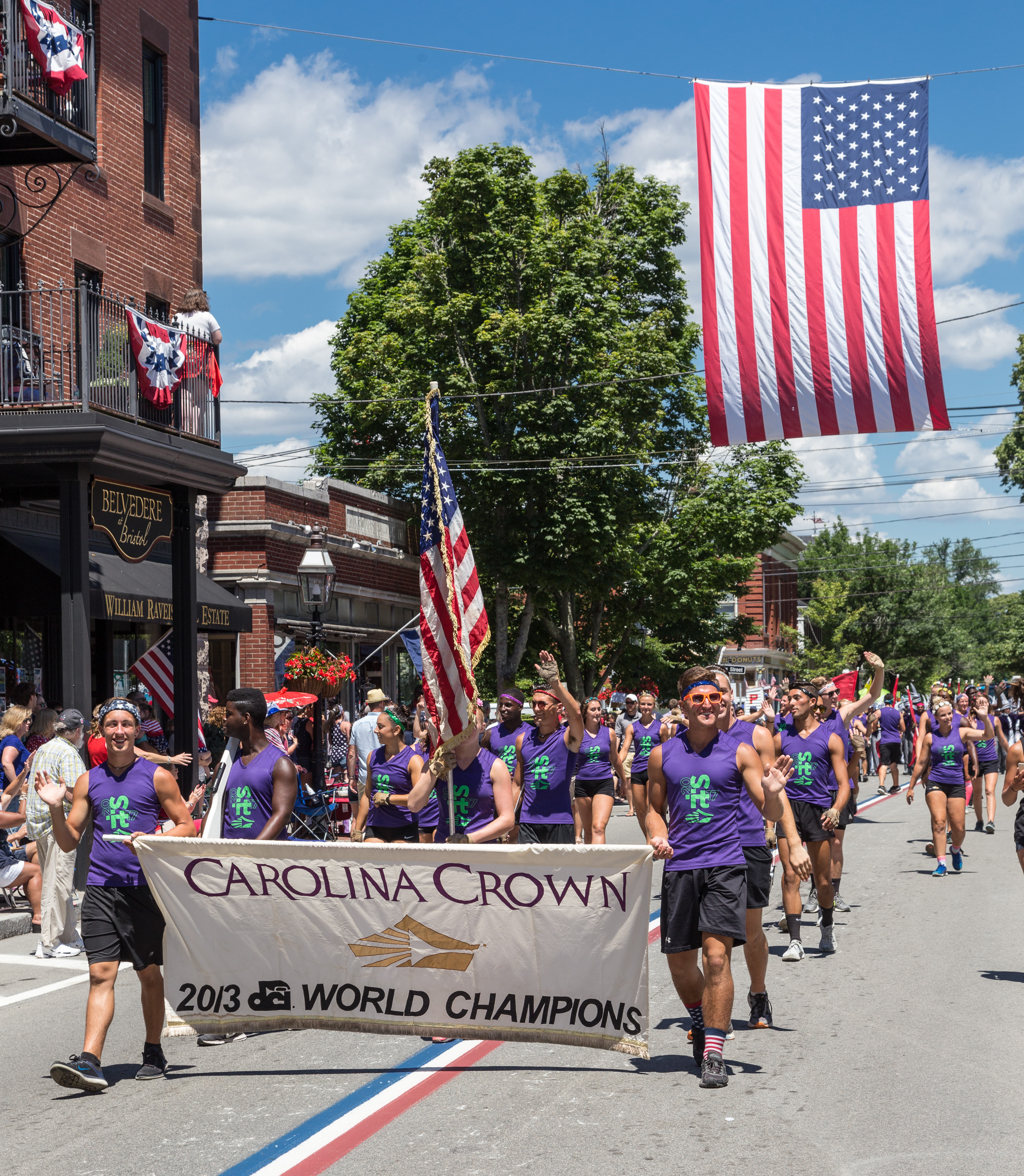
Carolina Crown Drum and Bugle Corps marches in the Bristol, Rhode Island Fourth of July Parade in 2017.

== History ==
The Carolina Crown organization was founded in 1988 as the Charlotte Drum Corps Association, a group of local drum corps fans who gathered on an irregular basis to talk about drum corps and watch drum corps video. The group hosted two drum corps shows, Southern Gold Classic at Davidson College and NightBEAT at Charlotte's Memorial Stadium. Southern Gold Classic drew a small audience and lost money. NightBEAT was much better attended, but the group was unable to pay the stadium rental. When the NightBEAT committee met with Charlotte Parks and Recreation Department to discuss working out some sort of payment schedule, they were surprised when they not only wrote off the bill for the 1988 NightBEAT but offered the a sponsorship for future shows. In 1989, a gift of $1000 was offered by the Queen City Optimists with the proviso that the organization start a performance group; after discussions initially centered on starting a drumline, the Carolina Crown Drum and Bugle Corps was born.

After the corps bought a complete set of drums from a defunct drum and bugle corps only to discover that they were seriously damaged, John Cummings of Ludwig Drums offered to repair the drums as part of an informal sponsorship of the corps. The name Carolina Crown was adopted to recognize the groups' desire to represent the Carolinas region while still recognizing Charlotte, the Queen City, which has a crown in its logo. The leadership group met, in the fall of 1989, with several young band directors who were also alumni of Suncoast Sound, Spirit of Atlanta, and the Madison Scouts drum and bugle corps to tell them of their efforts to start a new local corps. After locating and purchasing the horns of the defunct California Dons, Carolina Crown began recruiting members. The corps also formed a partnership with the Mecklenburg Council of the Boy Scouts of America as Explorer Post #588, which aided them in finding school space for auditions and practices.

In 1990, fielding a corps of only sixty-one members, Carolina Crown elected to compete in the Open Class (now known as World Class) in DCI. However, not only was the corps out-classed by the other, larger corps in Open Class, but it was also bested in DCI prelims by seven corps that had advanced from Classes A and A60, finishing thirty-third of 33 corps at their first DCI World Championships. In 1991, the corps dropped down to Class A. At the DCI Championships in Dallas, Carolina Crown finished in second place in Class A and advanced to Open Class prelims, where they placed twenty-fifth, earning DCI Associate membership. Carolina Crown was third in the 1992 Division II Championship, once more finishing in twenty-fifth place in Division I (which had been renamed from Open Class) prelims. At the 1993 DCI Championships, Carolina Crown won the Division II Championship title and finished in twenty-first place in Division I prelims.

After their championship in Division II, Carolina Crown opted to compete exclusively in Division I starting in 1994. That year, the corps finished seventeenth in DCI semifinals in Boston. In 1995, in only its sixth season, Carolina Crown earned a spot as one of the twelve finalists, placing eleventh overall. Since that first finals appearance, Carolina Crown has failed to make finals only once in 2002, finishing within the top five in finals every year since 2008. In 2013, the corps won the Drum Corps International World Class Championship with the first and only perfect brass score in finals history.

In 1995, the corps moved from Charlotte to Belmont, North Carolina. Following the 1997 season, the corps relocated to its present home of Fort Mill, South Carolina.

== Show summary (1990–2026) ==
Key
Light blue background indicates DCI Open Class Finalist (Note: In 1991, Carolina Crown competed in Class A, and from 1992–1993 in Division II & III; these are the same tier, and have since been renamed Open Class.)
Golden background indicates DCI Open Class Champion
Pale green background indicates DCI World Class Semifinalist (Note: From 1994–2007, Carolina Crown competed in Division I, and has competed since 2008 in World Class. These are the same tier, just renamed.)
Pale blue background indicates DCI World Class Finalist
Dark gold background indicates DCI World Class Champion

Year	Repertoire	World Championships	
Year	Repertoire	Score	Placement
1990	The Music Man; Goodnight, My Someone; Ya Got Trouble; Lida Rose; Marian the Librarian; Till There Was You; Goodnight Ladies & 76 Trombones; All from The Music Man by Meredith Willson	58.600	33rd Place; Open Class
1991	The Music of Prokofiev; Piano Concerto No. 3; March Opus 99; Troika (from Lieutenant Kijé Suite); Alexander Nevsky & Ivan the Terrible; All by Sergei Prokofiev	91.500	2nd Place; Class A Finalist
1991	The Music of Prokofiev; Piano Concerto No. 3; March Opus 99; Troika (from Lieutenant Kijé Suite); Alexander Nevsky & Ivan the Terrible; All by Sergei Prokofiev	66.400	25th Place; Open Class
1992	The Dances of Malcolm Arnold; English Dance I (Set One, Op. 27); English Dance II (Set Two, Op. 53); English Dance IV (Set One, Op. 27); Four Scottish Dances III (Op. 59); Four Cornish Dances IV (Op. 91); All by Malcolm Arnold	90.500	3rd Place; Division II & III; Finalist
1992	The Dances of Malcolm Arnold; English Dance I (Set One, Op. 27); English Dance II (Set Two, Op. 53); English Dance IV (Set One, Op. 27); Four Scottish Dances III (Op. 59); Four Cornish Dances IV (Op. 91); All by Malcolm Arnold	67.900	25th Place; Division I
1993	La Fiesta Mexicana; Aztec Dance, Mass & Carnival; All from La Fiesta Mexicana by H. Owen Reed	94.300	1st Place; Division II; Champion
1993	La Fiesta Mexicana; Aztec Dance, Mass & Carnival; All from La Fiesta Mexicana by H. Owen Reed	74.200	21st Place; Division I
1994	A Southwestern Impression; El Salón México by Aaron Copland / Rio Grande, Round Up, Wagon Train & Fiesta (from Santa Fe Saga) by Morton Gould	75.100	17th Place; Division I Semifinalist
1995	Stormworks; Stormworks by Stephen Melillo / Watermark by Enya / The Storm by Marty McCartt	82.800	11th Place; Division I Finalist
1996	Chess... and the Art of Strategy; Strategical Fanfare by Marty McCartt / Presto with Malice (from Symphony No. 1) by Sir William Walton / Nimrod & Variation XV (based on Enigma Variations) by Sir Edward Elgar, arranged by Marty McCartt	82.100	10th Place; Division I Finalist
1997	Postcards from Britain; Crown Imperial by Sir William Walton / Terpsichore, Mvt. 4 by Bob Margolis / Nimrod (from Enigma Variations) by Sir Edward Elgar / Jig (from St Paul's Suite) by Gustav Holst	85.000	12th Place; Division I Finalist
1998	Heroes: Then and Now; Russian Christmas Music, Armenian Dances & Praise Jerusalem; All by Alfred Reed	85.700	11th Place; Division I Finalist
1999	Jekyll and Hyde; Prologue; Once Upon A Dream; Murder, Murder; Confrontation; In His Eyes & Façade; All from Jekyll & Hyde by Frank Wildhorn, Leslie Bricusse & Steve Cuden	86.300	11th Place; Division I Finalist
2000	The Mask of Zorro; Main Title, The Ride, Diego's Goodbye & Stealing the Map; All from The Mask of Zorro by James Horner	85.150	11th Place; Division I Finalist
2001	Industry; Original Music by Marty McCartt / Concerto for Four Percussion by David Gillingham / Main Theme (from The Cider House Rules) by Rachel Portman / Motown Metal by Michael Daugherty	86.950	10th Place; Division I Finalist
2002	Greek Mythology: Stories of Gods and Heroes; Second Essay for Orchestra by Samuel Barber / Javelin by Michael Torke / One Day I'll Fly Away (from Moulin Rouge!) by Will Jennings & Joe Sample / Dance of Vengeance (from Medea) & Piano Concerto by Samuel Barber	81.800	16th Place; Division I Semifinalist
2003	Bell-isimo! Mass (from La Fiesta Mexicana) by H. Owen Reed / Earth (from Symphony No. 1) by Philip Sparke / Engulfed Cathedral by Claude Debussy / Stained Glass by David Gillingham / Carol of the Bells by Mykola Leontovych	86.650	10th Place; Division I Finalist
2004	Bohemia! The Moldeau (from Má vlast) by Bedřich Smetana / La Bohème by Giacomo Puccini / Epistrophy by Thelonious Monk & Kenneth Clark / Seasons of Love (from Rent) by Jonathan Larson / Beat Generation (Original Music) / Bohemian Rhapsody by Freddie Mercury (Queen)	91.225	7th Place; Division I Finalist
2005	Angelus; The Reason by Ed Nalle & Bob Kauflin (GLAD) / A Mighty Fortress by Martin Luther / Angel by Sarah McLachlan / Never Surrender (from First Knight) by Jerry Goldsmith / Joy (from Awakening) by Joseph Curiale / Call of the Mountain (from Gates of Gold) by Joseph Curiale	90.725	7th Place; Division I Finalist
2006	In.trance.it; Urban Dances & Celestial Night by Richard Danielpour	89.975	8th Place; Division I Finalist
2007	Triple Crown; Theme (from Dreamer) by John Debney / The Trap by James Newton Howard / Wild Horses by Mick Jagger & Keith Richards (The Rolling Stones) / Happy Ending (from The Red Pony) by Aaron Copland / Manny's Story (from Dreamer) by John Debney / William Tell Overture by Gioachino Rossini / Last Race (from Dreamer) by John Debney	94.150	6th Place; Division I Finalist
2008	Finis; Candide by Leonard Bernstein / Toccata and Fugue in D Minor by Johann Sebastian Bach / Barber of Seville by Gioachino Rossini / Ode to Joy (Symphony No. 9) by Ludwig van Beethoven / Midsummer Night's Dream No. 9 by Felix Mendelssohn / Claire De Lune by Claude Debussy / One Hand One Heart & Somewhere (from West Side Story) by Leonard Bernstein / Hungarian Rhapsody No. 2 by Franz Liszt / Festive Overture by Dmitri Shostakovich / 1812 Overture by Pyotr Ilyich Tchaikovsky / Appalachian Spring by Aaron Copland / Hallelujah Chorus by George Frederic Handel	96.800	4th Place; World Class; Finalist
2009	The Grass Is Always Greener; The Promise of Living (from The Tender Land) by Aaron Copland / Church Windows by Ottorino Respighi / Puck (from Il Sogno) by Elvis Costello / Over the Rainbow (from The Wizard of Oz) by Harold Arlen & E.Y. Harburg / Somewhere (from West Side Story) by Leonard Bernstein / Hybrid by Lee Beddis / Slalom by Carter Pann / Sensemayá by Silvestre Revueltas	97.500	2nd Place; World Class; Finalist
2010	A Sec2nd Chance; Resurrection Symphony (Symphony No. 2) by Gustav Mahler / Symphony No. 2 by Aram Khatchaturian / Danzón No. 2 by Arturo Marquez / Nimrod (from Enigma Variations) by Edward Elgar / The Promise of Living from The Tender Land) by Aaron Copland	95.950	4th Place; World Class; Finalist
2011	Rach Star; We Will Rock You by Brian May (Queen) / Symphonic Dances by Sergei Rachmaninoff / "Paint It Black" by Mick Jagger & Keith Richards (The Rolling Stones) / Iron Man by Ozzy Osbourne, Tony Iommi, Geezer Butler & Bill Ward (Black Sabbath) / Eruption by Michael Anthony, David Lee Roth, Eddie Van Halen & Alex Van Halen (Van Halen) / Bohemian Rhapsody by Freddie Mercury (Queen) / Piano Concerto No. 2 by Sergei Rachmaninoff / Piano Concerto No. 1 by Keith Emerson / Rhapsody on a Theme of Paganini by Sergei Rachmaninoff	95.300	4th Place; World Class; Finalist
2012	For the Common Good; Fanfare for the Common Man by Aaron Copland / Dreams by Bertrand Moren / Symphony No. 3 by Aaron Copland	97.650	2nd Place; World Class; Finalist
2013	E=mc^{2} Also Sprach Zarathustra by Richard Strauss / Einstein on the Beach by Philip Glass / Walking with Heroes by Paul Lovatt-Cooper / The Devil's Bridge by Bertrand Moren / The Abyss by Alan Silvestri / The Light Fantastic & The Dark Side of the Moon by Paul Lovatt-Cooper	98.300	1st Place; World Class; Champion
2014	Out of This World; Space Oddity by David Bowie / Interstellar Suite by Amin Bhatia / Shadow Behind the Iron Sun by Evelyn Glennie / There's No Place Like Home (from Lost) by Michael Giacchino / Major Tom (Coming Home) by Peter Schilling / Perihelion by Philip Sparke / Vitae Aeternum by Paul Lovatt-Cooper	95.675	5th Place; World Class; Finalist
2015	Inferno; Gates of Hell by Thom Hannum, Tony Nunez & Steve Ridley / Dies Irae (from Requiem) by Giuseppe Verdi / Symphony for Organ and Orchestra by Aaron Copland / Adagio in G Minor by Remo Giazotto / Symphony No. 9 by Ludwig van Beethoven	97.075	2nd Place; World Class; Finalist
2016	Relentless; The Good, the Bad and the Ugly & The Ecstasy of Gold by Ennio Morricone / Medea's Dance of Vengeance by Samuel Barber / Journey of the Lone Wolf by Simon Dobson / El Tango de Roxanne (from Moulin Rouge!) by Sting, Craig Pearce, Baz Luhrmann & Mariano Mores / Hallelujah by Leonard Cohen / Il Triello (The Trio) by Ennio Morricone / Equilibrium by Paul Lovatt-Cooper	97.088	3rd Place; World Class; Finalist
2017	It Is... Little Fugue in G Minor by Johann Sebastian Bach / Crown Imperial by Sir William Walton / Symphony No. 3 by Vittorio Giannini / Old Home Days by Charles Ives / For Good (from Wicked) by Stephen Schwartz / NO one To kNOW one by Andy Akiho / Raveling, Unraveling by Philip Sparke	96.575	3rd Place; World Class; Finalist
2018	Beast; Symphony No. 8, Mvt. 4 by Anton Bruckner / Build a Pyre by Ryan Lott (Son Lux) / Destination Moon by Paul Raphael / Myth Forest by Stig Nordhagen / If I Fell by John Lennon & Paul McCartney / Blow It Up, Start Again by Jonathan Newman / Epiphanies (Fanfares and Chorales) by Ron Nelson	95.500	4th Place; World Class; Finalist
2019	Beneath the Surface; Temen Oblak (from The Drop That Contained the Sea) by Christopher Tin / Frolic (from Rabbit and Rogue) by Danny Elfman / Gabriel's Oboe (from The Mission) by Ennio Morricone / Bucimis (Traditional) by The Swingles with Trichy Sankaran	96.563	4th Place; World Class; Finalist
2020	Season canceled due to the COVID-19 pandemic		
2021	In My Mind; Carolina In My Mind by James Taylor / Seize the Day by Peter Graham / Gravity by Sara Bareilles / Toccata Andromeda by Paul Halley (Carolina Crown did not perform live at DCI events in 2021)	No scored competitions	
2022	Right Here, Right Now! With the Love in My Heart by Jacob Collier / Chandelier by Sia Furler & Jesse Shatkin / Chasing the Moment by Michael Klesch, Thom Hannum, Andrew Monteiro, Jim Ancona & Travis Peterman / Benedictus by Karl Jenkins / Own The Moment by Andrew Monteiro & Travis Peterman / Toccata Andromeda by Paul Halley	96.350	4th Place; World Class; Finalist
2023	The Round Table: Echoes of Camelot; The Night Window by Thomas Newman / Bachelorette by Björk / String Quartet No. 2, Mvt. 2 by Béla Bartók / Requiem in D-Minor (Lacrimosa) by Wolfgang Amadeus Mozart / Stampede (from Australia) by David Hirschfelder / All is Full of Love by Björk / Tristan and Isolde by Richard Wagner / Manifest 3 by Elliot Goldenthal / The Wounded King by Michael Klesch, Michael Martin, Kevin Shah & Mike Jackson / Dido's Lament by Henry Purcell	97.663	3rd Place; World Class; Finalist
2024	Promethean; American Prometheus by Ludwig Emil Tomas Göransson / Run! by Benjamin Wallfisch / Define Dancing by Thomas Newman / Fraternity by Thierry Deleruyelle / Fission by John Mackey	95.025	5th Place; World Class; Finalist
2025	The Point of No Return; Carmina Burana: No. 21 (In trutina) by Carl Orff / Music for Prague 1968 by Karel Husa / Carmina Burana: No. 10 (Were diu werit alle min), No. 18 (Circa mea pectora) & No. 20 (Veni, veni, venias) by Carl Orff / Symphony No. 5: Adagietto (Sehr langsam) by Gustav Mahler / Étude No. 13 (The Devil's Staircase) by György Ligeti / Carmina Burana: No. 1 (O Fortuna) by Carl Orff	94.800	5th Place; World Class; Finalist
2026	The Doors of Perception; A Gabrieli Fantasy by Bert Appermont / Divertimento: Movement 3 by Matt Hightower / Abblasen by Gottfried Reiche / Ranjani by Varijashree Venugopal & Michael League / Ave Maria by Franz Schubert / Extreme Make-Over by Johan de Meij / Break On Through (To the Other Side) by The Doors / People Are Strange by Jim Morrison & Robby Krieger / Riders on the Storm & The End by The Doors / Original Music by Michael Klesch, Clif Walker, Joe Hobbs & Michael Martin	97.038	3rd Place; World Class; Finalist

== Caption awards ==
At the annual World Championship Finals, Drum Corps International (DCI) presents awards to the corps with the highest average scores from prelims, semifinals, and finals in five captions. Carolina Crown has won these caption awards:

Jim Ott Best Brass Performance Award

- 2009, 2011, 2012, 2013, 2016, 2017, 2019, 2023, 2026

John Brazale Best Visual Performance Award

- 2012, 2013, 2016

Don Angelica Best General Effect Award

- 2013, 2015

George Zingali Best Color Guard Award

- 2016
