= Star of Indiana Drum and Bugle Corps =

Defunct junior drum corps from Bloomington, Indiana

Star of Indiana
- Location: Bloomington, Indiana
- Division: Division I
- Founded: 1984
- Inactive: 1994; 32 years ago
- Championship titles: 1991

The Star of Indiana Drum and Bugle Corps is a defunct competitive junior drum and bugle corps, based in Bloomington, Indiana. The corps was the 1991 Drum Corps International (DCI) World Champion.

== History ==
=== The DCI years ===
The Star of Indiana Drum and Bugle Corps was founded in 1984 in Bloomington, Indiana. Its startup was funded with a grant of $1,000,000 from Bill Cook and his medical device manufacturing company, the Cook Group. Marching a then-maximum one hundred twenty-eight members under the directorship of Jim Mason, at the 1985 DCI World Championships in Madison, Wisconsin, Star of Indiana became only the second corps to earn a spot among the top twelve finalists in its first season of competition. (The first corps to do so was the Bleu Raeders in 1972, the inaugural year of Drum Corps International.) Star of Indiana marched in DCI competition for only nine seasons, but finished in DCI Finals every year, twice finishing third, second once, and winning the 1991 DCI Open Class World Championship. In addition to its DCI title, Star also won the Drum Corps Midwest Division I Championship, 1991–93; the U.S. Open in 1988 and 1989; the DCI Preview of Champions title, 1991–93; and ten DCI Regional Championships, 1988–93.

=== Brass Theater ===
As early as 1992, Star's staff knew that they wanted the corps to do more than perform a thirteen-minute drum corps competition program. After the 1993 season, Star of Indiana departed the competition field and developed a new way of presenting drum corps. "Brass Theater" was designed to apply the powerful brass and percussion and the exacting choreography of drum corps to pop, Broadway, movie, and classical music to create an all-new type of stage entertainment. Touring with the Canadian Brass, the world's most popular brass quintet, "Brass Theater" was a hit with fans and critics alike on a ten-city tour in 1994. Star and the Canadian Brass toured again in 1995 and '96 as "Brass Theater II" and "... III" to even greater acclaim. The two groups also recorded three CDs of the "Brass Theater" programs. Then, in 1997 and '98, Star settled down to perform "Brass Theater" at the Grand Palace Theatre in Branson, Missouri.

=== Blast! ===
In 1999, Star premiered the stage show Blast! at the Hammersmith Theatre in London, England. After an unimpressive start, its audience steadily grew, until it became a top ten hit on the London stage. After a year in London, "Blast!” returned to the U.S. in 2000, debuting on the Broadway stage to rave reviews. The show won the 2001 Tony Award for Best Special Theatrical Event, and, when it was videotaped for PBS, it won the 2001 Emmy Award for Best Choreography. After its Broadway run, Star took Blast! on the road, with companies touring the country each year to large and enthusiastic audiences. Casts were also developed to perform long-term engagements at Disneyland in Anaheim, California and at Disney World in Orlando, Florida. Blast! continuously toured through 2012, with occasional tours in the years since.

== Alumni corps ==
In August 2010, Star of Indiana returned to the DCI World Championships. The alumni had previously gathered to perform, but on August 11, the Star of Indiana Alumni Corps performed after the last competing corps in DCI's semifinals at Lucas Oil Stadium in Indianapolis.

One group of Star of Indiana alumni formed Star United, a mini-corps that competes at the Drum Corps Associates (DCA) senior drum and bugle corps championships. Star United won the DCA mini-corps championship 2006–2012, 2014–2018, and 2022, and scored a perfect 100.00 in the 2011 Finals. Star United also performed as a SoundSport team at the 2014 and 2017 DCI World Championships in Indianapolis.

== Show summary (1985–1993) ==
Key
Pale blue background indicates DCI World Class Finalist (Note: From 1985-1991, Star of Indiana competed in Open Class, and from 1992-1993 in Division I. These are the same tier, which has since been renamed World Class. .)
Dark gold background indicates DCI World Class Champion

Year	Repertoire	World Championships	
Year	Repertoire	Score	Placement
1985	A Salute to Walt Disney: A Musical Extravaganza in Three Acts; When You Wish Upon a Star by Ned Washington & Leigh Harline / Zip-a-Dee-Doo-Dah by Allie Wrubel & Ray Gilbert / A Dream is a Wish Your Heart Makes by Mack David, Al Hoffman & Jerry Livingston / The Sorcerer's Apprentice by Paul Dukas / Who's Afraid of the Big Bad Wolf? by Frank Churchill & Ann Ronell / Mickey Mouse Club March by Jimmie Dodd / It's a Small World by Robert B. Sherman & Richard M. Sherman	85.50	10th Place; Open Class; Finalist
1986	Out Of This World; Adventures on Earth (from E.T.), Selections from Close Encounters of the Third Kind, The Throne Room & Finale (from Star Wars); All by John Williams	90.50	8th Place; Open Class; Finalist
1987	Greatest Show On Turf; Barnum and Bailey's Favorite by Karl King / Ritual Fire Dance (from El Amor Brujo) by Manuel de Falla / Sabre Dance by Aram Khachaturian / Comedians: Galop by Dmitry Kabalevsky / Entrance of the Gladiators (aka Thunder and Blazes) by Julius Fučík	90.00	7th Place; Open Class; Finalist
1988	George Gershwin's "Porgy and Bess"; Overture; I Can't Sit Down; Summertime; The Hurricane; Bess, You Is My Woman Now; Oh, Lord, I'm On My Way; All from Porgy and Bess by George Gershwin, DuBose Heyward & Ira Gershwin	92.80	7th Place; Open Class; Finalist
1989	British Invasion; Henry V by William Walton / Song Without Words (I'll Love My Love) & Fantasia On The Dargason by Gustav Holst / Crown Imperial by William Walton	95.30	6th Place; Open Class; Finalist
1990	Belshazzar's Feast; Praise Ye the God of Gold & Then Sing Aloud to God Our Strength (from Belshazzar's Feast) by William Walton	96.50	3rd Place; Open Class; Finalist
1991	Roman Images; Roman Festivals (First Movement), The Pines of Rome (First Movement) & Roman Festivals (Second, Third & Fourth Movements); All by Ottorino Respighi	97.00	1st Place; Open Class; Champion
1992	American Variations; Star Spangled Overture by Morton Gould / Chester Overture by William Schuman / Amber Waves by Morton Gould / Flag of Stars by Gordon Jacob	96.70	3rd Place; Division I Finalist
1993	The Music of Barber and Bartók; Parados & Kantikos Agonias (from Medea) by Samuel Barber / Music for Strings, Percussion and Celeste (Second & Fourth Movements) by Béla Bartók / Adagio (from Piano Concerto No. 2) by Bartók / Medea's Dance of Vengeance (from Medea) by Samuel Barber	97.30	2nd Place; Division I Finalist

== Caption awards ==
At the annual World Championship Finals, Drum Corps International (DCI) presents awards to the corps with the high average scores from prelims, semifinals, and finals in five captions. Prior to 2000 and the adoption of the current scoring format, Star of Indiana won these captions:

=== High General Effect Award ===
- 1991 (tie)

=== High Brass Performance Award ===
- 1990, 1991 (tie), 1992, 1993 (tie)

=== High Percussion Performance Award ===
- 1991 (tie), 1993
