= Drumline Live =

Drumline Live is a theatrical production created from the executive consultants of the hit 2002 movie Drumline. Drumline Live has a very large similarity to the Emmy award and Tony Award winning Broadway show Blast!.

Drumline Live traces the heritage of the HBCU marching band, concentrating primarily on the percussion instruments along with the use of "auxiliary" ...high energy dancing and stepping to interpret the music visually. Dramatic lighting, intricate choreography, exciting costumes and stage effects enhance the show theatrically.

The show is composed of a 40-45 person crew, including trained musicians, dancers, singers and actors.
