= Drum major (marching band) =

Military musician

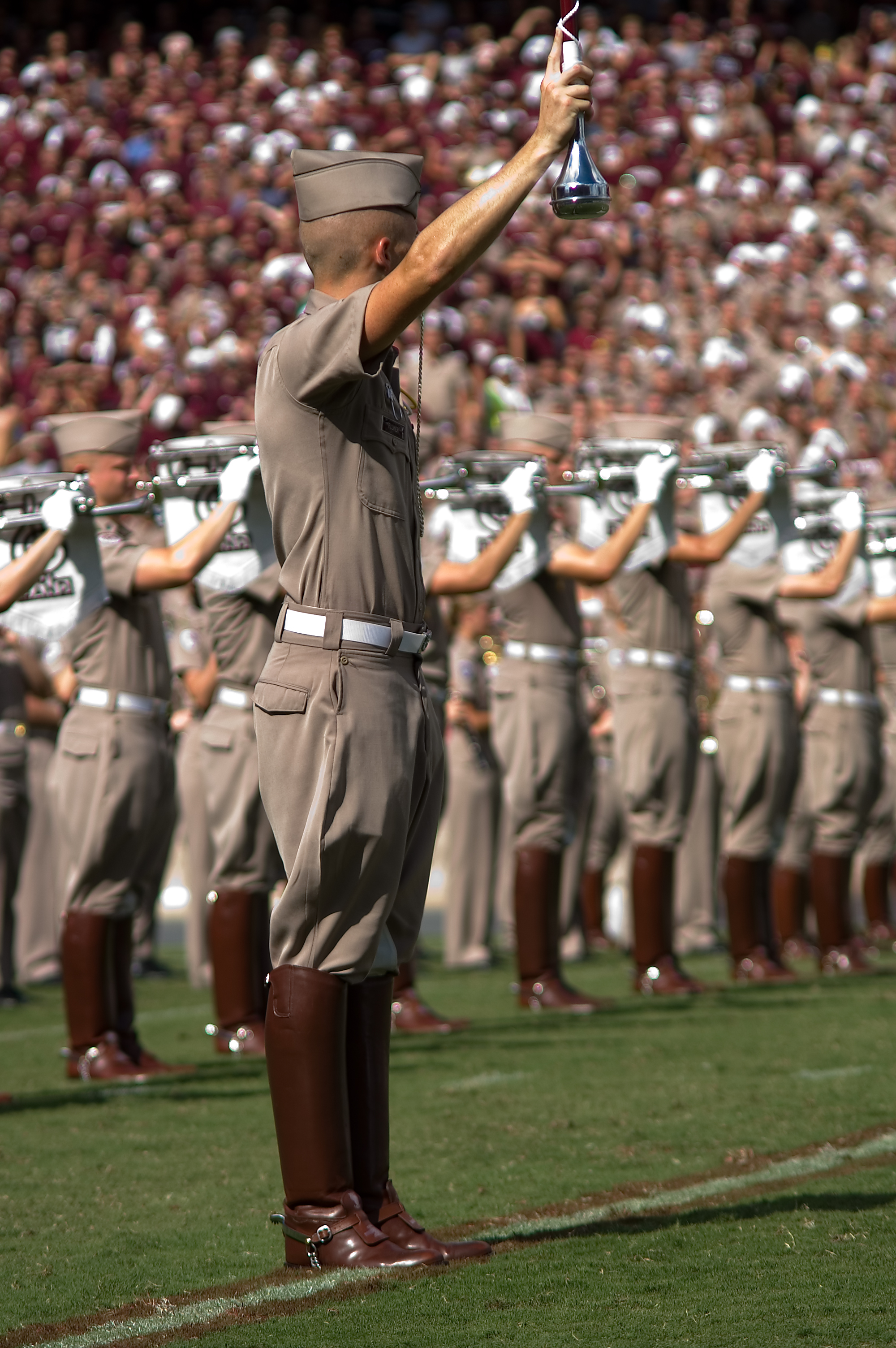
The drum major for the Fightin' Texas Aggie Band

A drum major or field commander is the leader of a marching band, drum and bugle corps, or pipe band, usually positioned at the head of the band or corps. The drum major is often dressed in more ornate clothing than the rest of the band or corps and is responsible for providing commands to the ensemble, leading them while marching, and directing them what to play, when to play, the dynamic or volume of playing, and what time to keep. The commands may be given verbally, through hand gestures, using a whistle or a baton, or with a mace.

In addition, the drum major serves as the liaison between the band director and the band. Essentially, a drum major is the leader who keeps the tempo with the use of a baton or other forms of time-keeping, such as conducting. The drum major often holds the responsibility to keep the band organized and structured.

== History ==
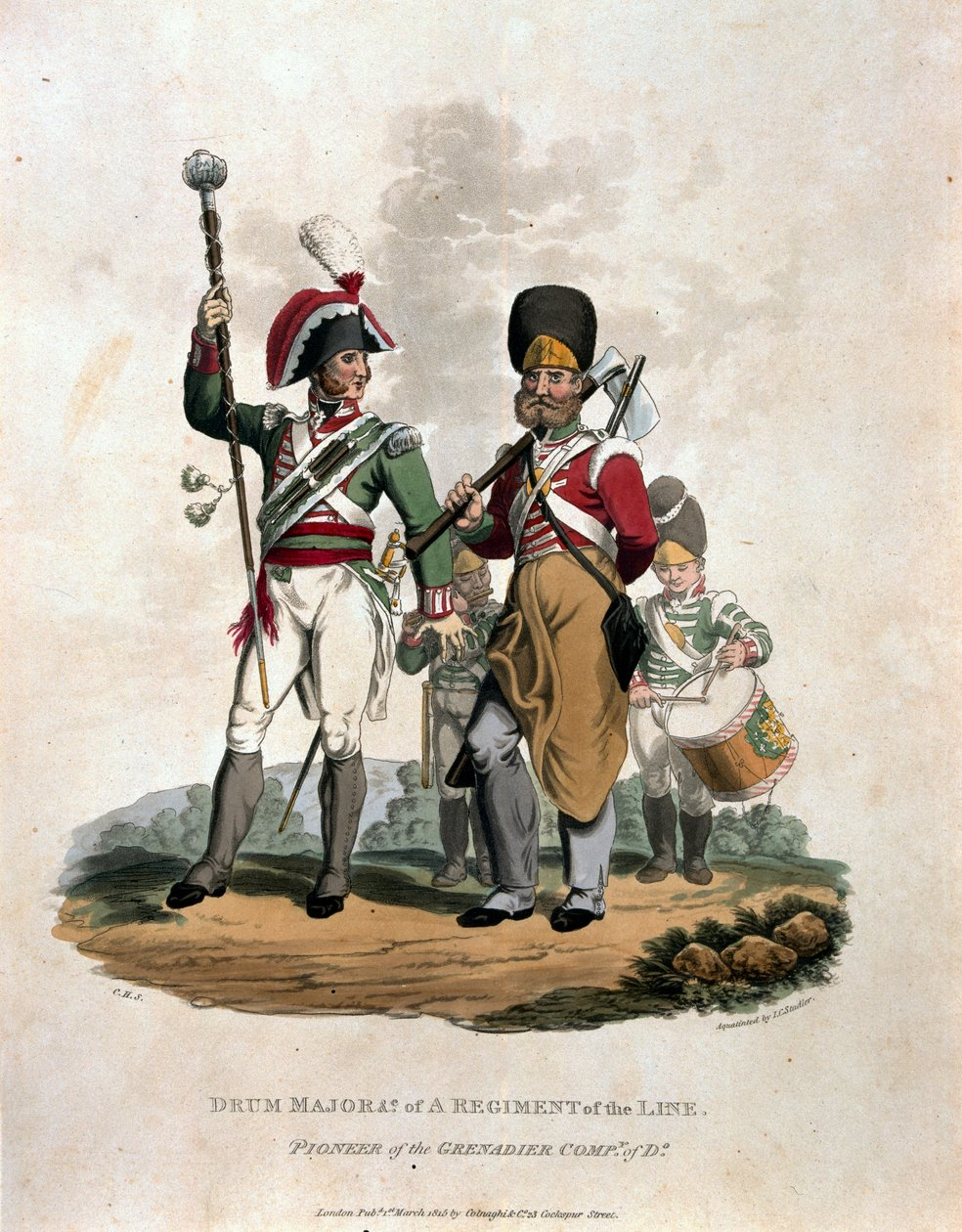
1815 engraving of a British Army drum major (left)

The position of drum major originated in the English army with the Corps of Drums in 1650. Military groups performed mostly duty calls and battle signals during that period, and a fife and drum corps, directed by the drum major, would use short pieces to communicate to field units. With the arrival of military concert bands and pipe bands around the 18th century, the position of the drum major was adapted to those ensembles.

Traditionally, a military drum major was responsible for:

- Defending the drummers and bandsmen (The drums and bugles were communication devices)
- Military discipline of all Corps of Drums members
- The Corps of Drums' overall standards of dress and deportment
- Corps of Drums administrative work
- Maintain the Corps of Drums' standard of military drill and choreograph marching movements

The drum major was also given duties in the battalion at several points in history, which included the administering of military justice (flogging) to any member of the battalion, and collecting the battalion's post.

In addition to the duties above, the British Army also included a royal appointment of drum major general, whose duties included inspecting all other field music as well as (per The Drummer's Handbook) granting drummers licenses without which, one would not be recognized as a drummer. This position faded in the 18th century.

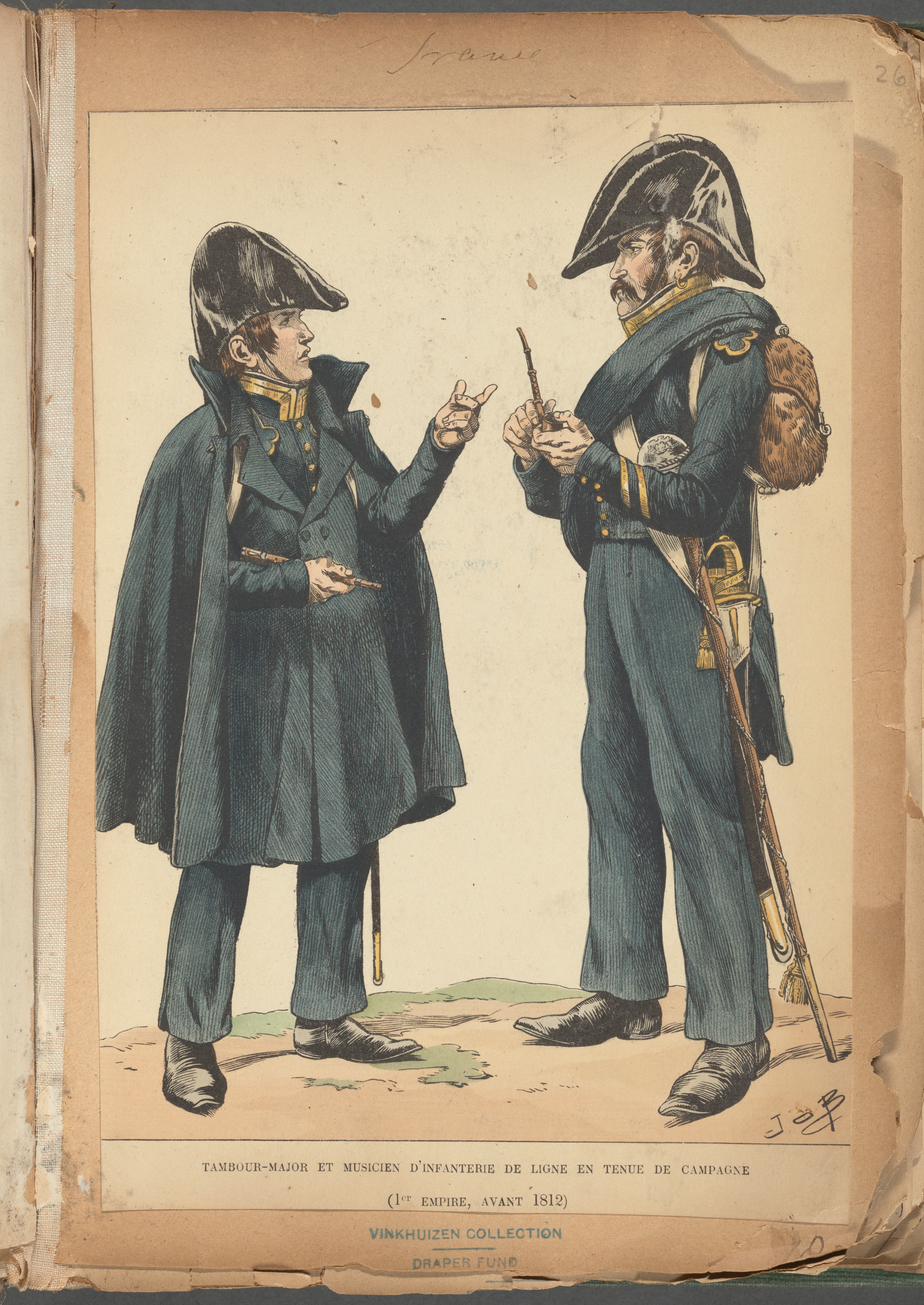
Drum major and infantry musician of the line in Napoleon's First Empire army, 1810

== Roles ==
=== Conductor ===
Drum majors are responsible for knowing the music of the ensemble and conducting it appropriately. While also knowing the tempo the drum major has to know what specific pattern he or she needs to perform in order to accommodate physical stamina or musical style.

Current drum majors use a variety of conducting patterns and styles that suit the needs of their respective marching bands and/or drum corps. The most commonly used pattern is called the "down-in-out-up" pattern. During the 1970s and prior it was not uncommon for a stationary drum major to do a high-lift mark time on the podium for an audible and visual tempo; with the arrival of increasingly higher drum major platforms and thus greater visibility this has become both dangerous and unnecessary and has become obsolete.

=== Assisting musicality ===
In addition to memorizing the music (between six and nine minutes of music is typical for high school marching bands, college bands and drum corps may have that much or more, up to more than eleven minutes of music) a drum major must memorize dynamics as well as tempo in order to provide proper direction and cues, particularly in area where the drum major has some discretion, such as a ritardando or fermata.

=== Performer ===
Drum majors have slightly different roles within the world of traditional show bands. Many college bands have drum majors who are very much part of the visual element of a field show. Rather than conduct as a corps-style drum major would, traditional drum majors often march on the field with the band, using a mace or baton to keep time and flourish their own movements. Drum majors in the Big Ten and HBCUs have a particularly prominent role. While most of them do not conduct as much as a corps drum major, they lead the band onto the field, often after having several seconds for a short performance by themselves (a drum major backbend is traditional in many schools). During dance routines, they often move along with the bands. As traditional drum majors have much more of a visual role than corps drum majors, there are often many more of them, sometimes up to ten drum majors to a single band.

=== Leader ===
The drum major position is one of leadership, instruction, and group representation, but usually not administrative duties. A band director or corps director assumes administrative responsibility. In the absence of the band director, the drum major often carries the authority of the director or instructor and assumes complete leadership over the band.

== Equipment ==
=== Uniform ===
==== American style ====
American style is among the most common styles displayed in the United States. Drum majors of this style will often wear a uniform different from the rest of the band (which may either be a show-specific uniform, or a custom uniform based on the school's uniform or colors) and is a slight modification of the standard uniform. It can be as simple as extra shoulder decorations, a cape, different-colored plumes (which are feathers that go atop a helmet or hat), or a chain on the helmet, or as complicated as a specialized chest section or a different color uniform, which is designed to help the drum major stand out.

Some high school drum majors do not wear a different uniform, however, and are recognized by their field or parade position. It is mostly a director's discretion, and is more common only on the high school level.

==== HBCU style ====
Historically Black Colleges and Universities (HBCUs) have cultivated a distinct drum major style that emphasizes both musical leadership and athletic, theatrical performance. HBCU drum majors are renowned for their high-energy field entrances, intricate backbends, elaborate mace and baton flourishes, and synchronized dance movements that complement the visual and musical performance of the band. Unlike traditional corps-style drum majors who primarily conduct, HBCU drum majors often function as both performers and leaders, blending showmanship with musical direction. Their role is central to the identity and competitive spirit of the band, often serving as cultural ambassadors who uphold long-standing traditions unique to HBCU marching bands.

They frequently lead multiple drum majors within a band, coordinating intricate formations and ensuring both musical accuracy and dramatic visual effects during halftime shows, parades, and competitions. HBCU drum majors also participate in competitions that judge style, creativity, charisma, and overall leadership.

==== British and other European styles ====
In British and European tradition, a drum major usually wears the same uniform as the rest of the band with the additional of a diagonal sash.

==== Scottish style ====
The Scottish style is commonly found in pipe bands and some high school marching bands. The Scottish style can be divided into two broad categories: Scottish daywear and Scottish regimental.

===== Daywear =====
Drum majors in Scottish daywear will typically wear a kilt (although some may choose not to in competitive settings in places such as the Highland games to score higher on dress inspection), pipers hoses and flashes, a sporran (typically without long horse hairs), some sort of formal jacket, and a Glengarry or Balmoral.

===== Regimental =====
Drum majors in Scottish regimental will typically wear a kilt, spats, a sporran (typically with long horse hairs), a jacket, and a feather bonnet.

=== Mace ===
The mace is a piece of equipment used to give certain commands when marching. A mace is longer than a baton and usually has the drum major beat time with the ferrule pointed down and the dome pointed up. Maces are used in Scotland, England, India, and in many American bands. Drum majors will typically use certain mace positions and audible calls to tell the band when to start and stop marching, and when to turn marching.

The mace is also a very important part of the performance aspect of a drum major. Drum majors usually spin their mace and perform tricks such as the prop-spin, roundhouses, tosses, and parallels.

=== Baton ===
Baton is another a piece of equipment used to give certain commands when marching that's used almost exclusively by certain American bands. Batons serve the same purpose as a mace.

=== Whistle ===
Some drum majors will use a whistle to give the audible parts of commands instead of shouting them verbally. This is most common in the American style.

=== Podium ===
When a band is not marching, the drum major may conduct from a podium so that the performers can better see them.

== United States marching bands ==
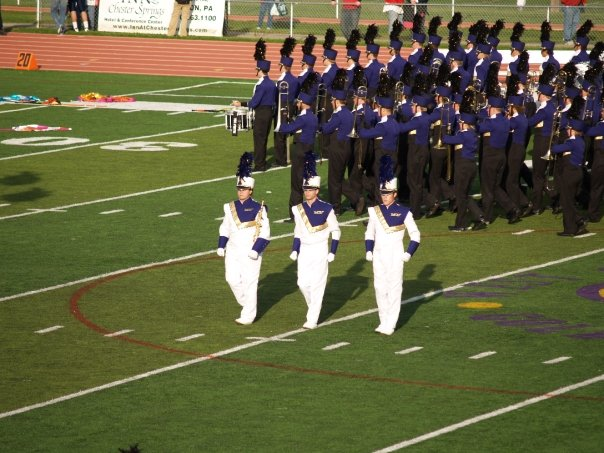
Three college drum majors from the West Chester University Golden Rams Marching Band lead their band onto the field.

Drum majors lead bands and drum & bugle corps in the U.S. Drum & bugle corps are predominant in Europe and Japan.The U.S. is the only country where most high schools, colleges, and universities have marching bands and drum majors. Drum majors primarily use whistle and baton or mace and vocal commands to cause the band to start marching and/or playing according to the planned performance. This requires timing skills on the field or street, so that the band starts and finishes at the designated spot. As the name implies, the drum major in reality, commands the drum section of the band – whistle commands are heard first, drums sounds ensue, and then music fills the air. The drum major usually wears a more elaborate uniform that is representative of the authority and responsibility of a field commander. A tall hat, such as the busby, is often part of the uniform in most American-style bands.

=== Field shows ===
Both high school and college field shows usually begin and end with a hand salute from the drum major(s). Salutes range in complexity from a simple hand-gesture to complicated routines involving many members of the band. The salute is traditionally the beginning of judging in a competition, and also signals the end of a band's show. A drum major is also responsible for calling the band to attention, beginning, and conducting the show. The drum major may use a whistle, vocal, or hand commands to accomplish this. This practice goes back to the military origins of the marching or field band.

To see one to three drum majors in most ensembles is typical. In some ensembles, drum majors switch positions during the show to allow all individuals a chance to conduct from the central podium. Occasionally, they may also serve in other capacities such as performing a solo, in which case one or two band directors would conduct the band temporarily until the drum major(s) would finish their solo.

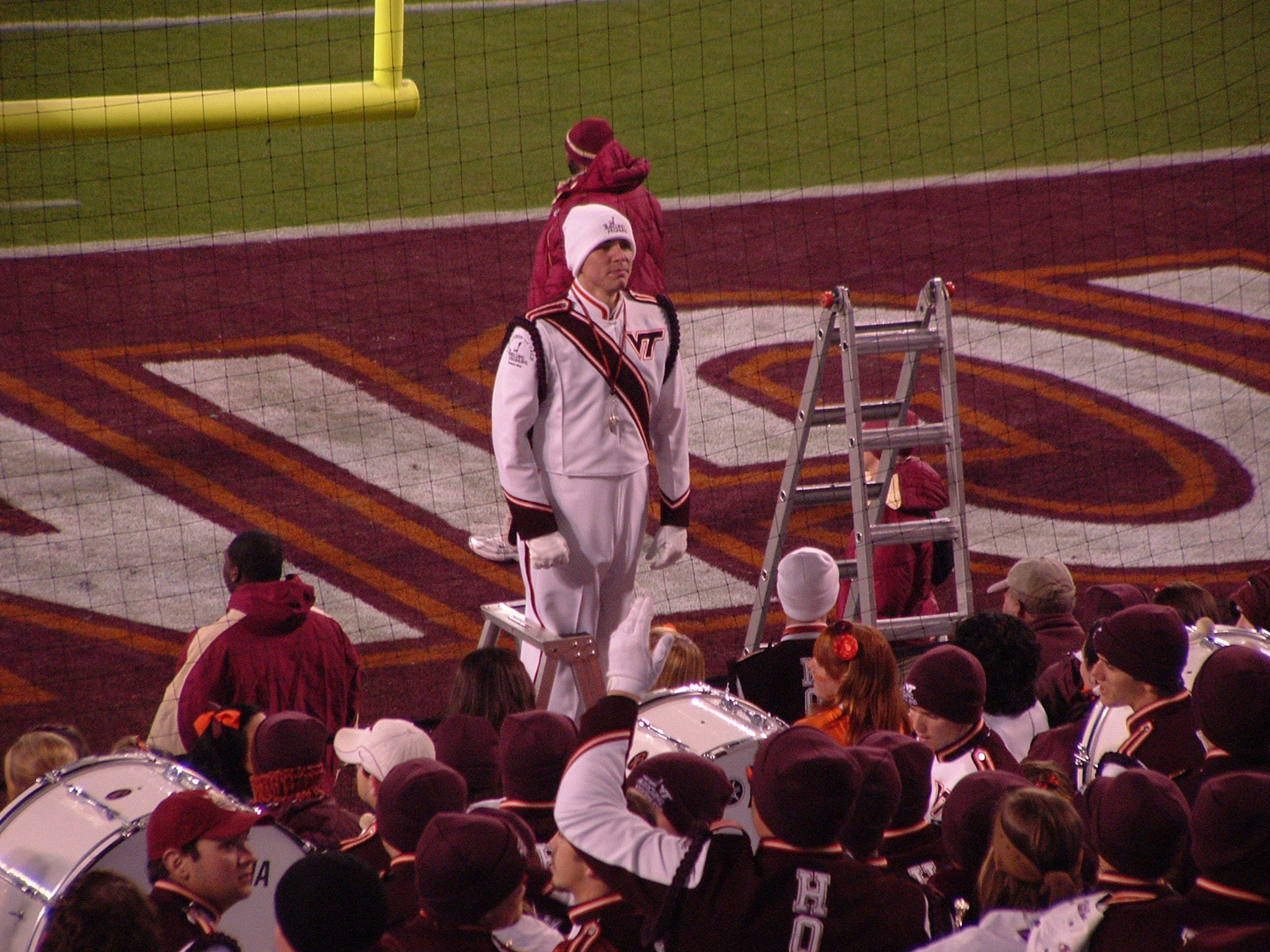
Drum major from Virginia Tech prepares to conduct the Marching Virginians prior to the 2010 ACC Championship Game.

A marching band or drum corps drum major (field conductor) is in charge of holding the band or corps together, and directing the entire band or corps during shows and competitions. This drum major can come from any section of the performing unit: percussion, winds, or color guard. They are chosen on their musical abilities, leadership qualities, attitude, and passion for the sport. The Drum Major is the highest-ranked band participant, usually followed by the captain(s) of the drumline, then by guard captain(s), pit captain(s) horn sergeant(s), section leaders and band officers.

In military bands, such as the Fightin' Texas Aggie Band or Highty-Tighties, drum majors are senior officers who are responsible for discipline and order of the band off the field, in addition to performance duties. They often command the band as an independent unit even off the playing field, and are treated according to their rank. In these bands, drum majors also march on the field and frequently use maces. Uniforms are in traditional military style; consequently, drum majors are distinguished by rank and unit insignia or distinguishing uniform modifications. For example, a drum major of the aforementioned Aggie Band could be recognized by his prominent wear of a whistle and chain, which is worn with the uniform even when not performing band-related duties. (Similar clothing in other bands may include sashes, unique headwear, or differently colored uniforms.) An example can be seen here.

=== Field conducting ===
When performing a field show, the drum major might conduct from a large podium and direct the band. This helps the band stay together and stay on-tempo.

One aforementioned pattern is the "down-in-out-up" pattern. The pattern is shown by the first beat being straight down and normal. The second beat goes down then after the focal point it goes in a 45-degree angle to the inside. The third beat is when the arm is coming back from the angle to the focal point at the angle and hits the point and goes to the outside at the same 45-degree angle. The last beat, fourth, goes from the outside angle back to the focal point. Then the process repeats.

=== Band reviews ===
A marching band review (parade performances). Because of the street setting, there are usually no change in formations. Unlike field shows, there is an added section specifically on the drum major's performance at band reviews. The drum major is scored based on the execution of the opening routine, salute routine, beating time, vocal/whistle/hand commands, and overall control of the band.

=== High school level field shows ===
Based on how large the band is, high school marching bands have anywhere from one to four drum majors who are responsible for conducting and leading the band. Drum majors are often ranked, so that the head drum major occupies the center position during the entire show, or each drum major takes turns as the 'central' drum major by standing on a platform placed on the 50-yard line, while the other two are placed on the 30-yard or 40-yard lines. Any other drum majors are placed on yard lines closer to the end zone, or to the rear of the band for about-turn maneuvers. A member of the on-field band may take a position as drum major temporarily if the band's movements require an additional drum major in the front or back or if the lead drum major performs. Some drum majors serve as leadership positions and can conduct, but prefer to march. These drum majors serve as replacements in case one or more of the permanent drum majors (usually older members of the band) can't make it to a performance, but still continue to practice their conducting abilities. Depending upon the region, field conducting may be done by the band director, allowing the drum major(s) to play a more important role in the performance by marching with the rest of the band.

==== Judging and adjudicating ====
During a field show the drum major is usually evaluated by a different judge than the rest of the band. How the drum major is judged depends on the region and style of the band and personal opinions of the judge themselves. Typical captions for judging a drum major include conducting, communication between drum majors, marching, style, showmanship, and leadership. Judge's comments will often be recorded by a hand held tape recorder and supplied to the drum majors along with the rest of the band's scores and feedback from the competition.

===== Examples of judge's evaluation sheets =====
- "World Drum Major Association's Judge's Conducting Sheet" (PDF). Archived from the original (PDF) on 28 July 2011., "World Drum Major Association's Judge's Conducting Rubric" (PDF). Archived from the original (PDF) on 28 July 2011.
- "Tom Peacock's American Competitions Field Conducting" (PDF). Archived from the original (PDF) on 9 May 2009., "Tom Peacock's American Competitions Parade" (PDF).

=== High school level band reviews ===
Band reviews, especially in California, are among the most popular competitions schools take part in (see "Band reviews" section above).

=== Award ceremony ===
If there is an awards ceremony at a marching competition (field or parade), the drum major(s) usually represent their band and accept any awards. The drum major(s) will usually prepare a separate, shorter salute in order to respectfully accept awards that their band has earned.

=== Selection and auditions ===
The process of appointing high school drum majors varies based on the school, though it is recognizably up to the director's discretion as to whom to select, which is done typically through an audition process where potential drum major candidates are evaluated in some or all of the following skills: Conducting, the ability to successfully call and execute commands, mace/baton flourishing, and overall leadership abilities.

=== Training ===
A drum major may be trained in a number of different ways depending on the resources of his or her home program and the drum major's own experience. In many schools, the band director actually refuses to personally teach the drum major conducting and leadership (because it is supposed to be the drum major's job to make that band director's job easier). Most drum majors attend drum major camps to learn to conduct and teach their band. Drum majoring is usually thought of as a leadership responsibility that cannot be taught, and the person selected for the position is ready (or the closest to ready) to take the responsibility. To be a good drum major can never be taught or fully trained to one person.

The George N. Parks Drum Major Academy (DMA) is a nationwide summer camp for high school drum majors. It was founded in 1978 by George N. Parks. The Drum Major Academy is held at various locations around the United States, by 2010 the academy drew up to 3,000 students each year. DMA provides students with marching, conducting, and leadership training in preparation for their upcoming seasons. Parks, considered a national authority on drum majoring, personally led many of these camps until his death in September 2010.

Smith Walbridge Clinics (SWC) has offered a Drum Major Clinic since 1952 and claim to be the nation's first drum major camp. The clinic teaches three styles of drum majoring including traditional, corps, and mace. Other training methods include three levels of conducting, three levels of showmanship, fundamentals of drill design, verbal commands, daily individual evaluations using video tapes, leadership training, score study, teaching and cleaning drill, multi-drum major help, salutes, and mace. The clinic is hosted yearly on the campus of Eastern Illinois University in Charleston, Illinois.

== In popular culture ==
- Rev. Dr. Martin Luther King Jr. used the role of the drum major to discuss selfishness, consumerism, servitude and love in his famous sermon "The Drum Major Instinct". He encouraged people to strive for excellence and leadership not out of selfishness or personal gain, but through service, love, and a commitment to justice. King highlighted the human desire to be recognized and to lead, but urged that true greatness comes from uplifting others, placing the welfare of the community above individual ambition. His sermon has inspired countless leaders and is still studied in educational, religious, and civic contexts. This message has been applied in teaching leadership ethics, social responsibility, and the moral dimension of ambition, reflecting the enduring impact of the drum major concept beyond music and performance. It has been exploited for education, religion and even advertising.

== See also ==
- Conducting
- Majorette
- Marching arts
- Marching band
