= Carl Cook =

American billionaire businessman

- Born: November 10, 1962 (age 63)
- Education: Purdue University (BS); University of Iowa (MBA)
- Occupations: CEO, Cook Group
- Spouse: Marcy Heshelman (m. 2008)
- Children: 1
- Parent(s): William Cook (father); Gayle Cook (mother)

Carl Cook (born November 10, 1962) is an American billionaire businessman. He is CEO of the Cook Group, a medical device company that was co-founded by his parents. As of May 2024, his net worth is estimated to be US$10.6 billion, making him the wealthiest person in the state of Indiana.

== Early life ==
He is the son of William Cook (died 2011) and Gayle Cook (died 2025), who co-founded the Cook Group.

He has a bachelor's degree in engineering from Purdue University, and an MBA from the University of Iowa.

== Career ==
After graduation, Cook traveled to France and Germany for a year, setting up computers for his family's company, the Cook Group, a medical devices company founded by his late father William Cook. He then worked at the Cook Group pacemaker division in Leechburg, Pennsylvania, and in their Winston-Salem plant.

Cook is also the president of a life sciences division of Cook Group, called Cook MyoSite, which is developing a cell therapy to treat urinary incontinence.

== Personal life ==
On January 5, 2008, Cook married Marcy Heshelman at the West Baden Springs Hotel, having met her when she was working in Cook Inc's auditing department. They live in Bloomington, Indiana, and have a daughter.
