= George N. Parks =

American conductor

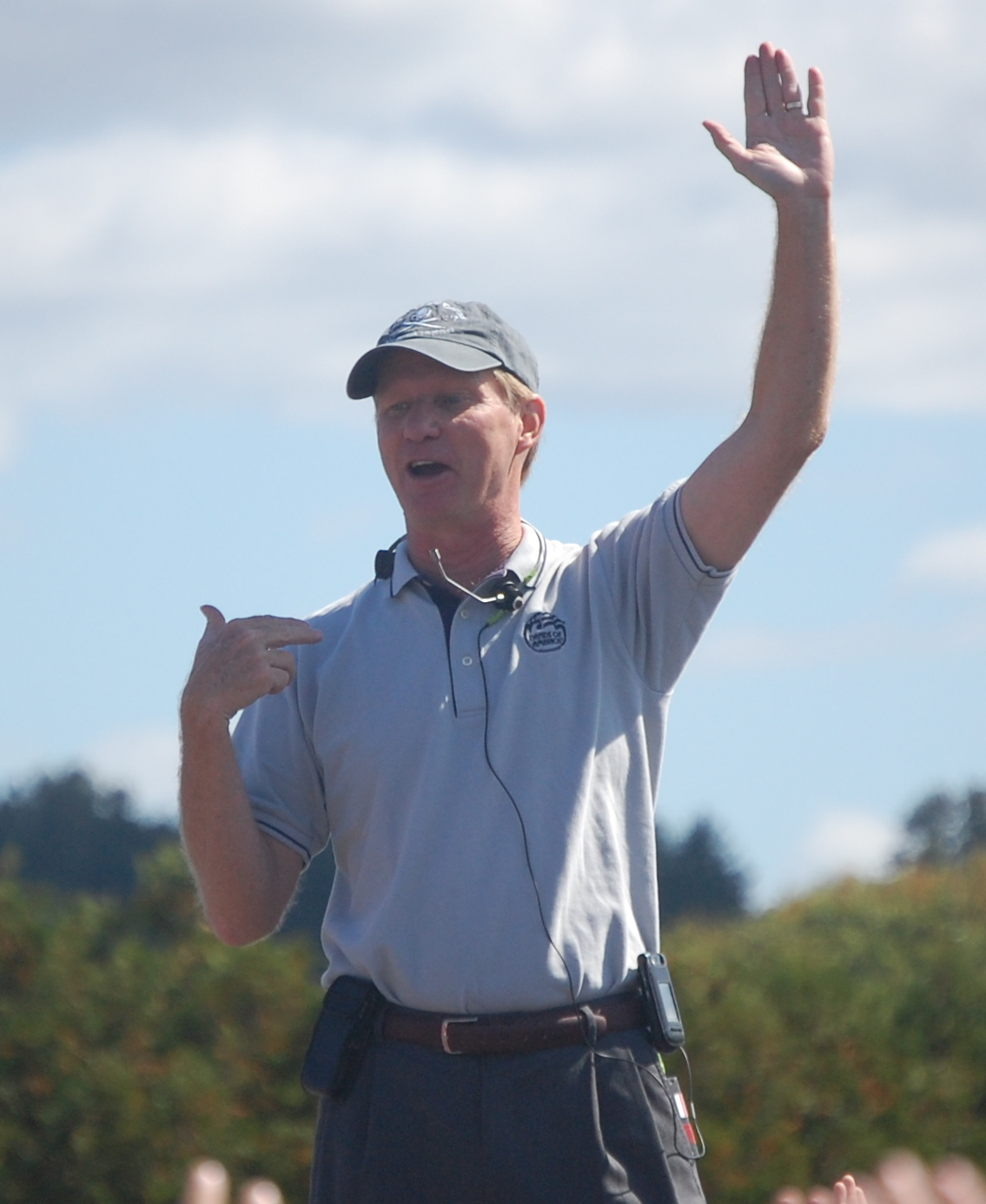
- Parks speaking to students during Band Day in 2009
- Born: May 23, 1953; Buffalo, New York, U.S.
- Died: September 16, 2010 (aged 57); Cuyahoga Falls, Ohio, U.S.
- Resting place: St. Brigid's Cemetery (Hadley, Massachusetts); 42°22′21.80″N 72°32′57.91″W
- Education: West Chester University; Northwestern University
- Occupations: Band director Music teacher
- Years active: 1977–2010
- Employer: University of Massachusetts Amherst
- Organization: George N. Parks Drum Major Academy
- Known for: Drum major instruction, Tuba performance, Director of the University of Massachusetts Minuteman Marching Band
- Spouse: Jeanne Parks
- Children: 2
- Awards: World Drum Corps Hall of Fame; Bands of America Hall of Fame

George N. Parks (May 23, 1953 – September 16, 2010) was the director of the University of Massachusetts Minuteman Marching Band at University of Massachusetts Amherst from 1977 until 2010. He also led the George N. Parks Drum Major Academy, a summer workshop program for high school drum majors that he founded in 1978.

== Early life and education ==
Parks was born on 23 May 1953 in Buffalo, New York and grew up in Newark, Delaware. He graduated from Christiana High School in 1971, and was the Drum Major of the high school's marching band. He earned a bachelor's degree from West Chester University, where he was the drum major in the West Chester University Golden Rams Marching Band. At West Chester, Parks was initiated into the Rho Sigma chapter of Phi Mu Alpha Sinfonia. After college he earned a master's degree in tuba performance at Northwestern University.

== Career ==
=== Drum corps ===
Parks made his first appearance on the national scene as Drum Major of the award-winning Reading Buccaneers Drum and Bugle Corps. He helped lead the Buccaneers to two DCA Championships, in 1979 and 1980, and received numerous individual honors, including eight DCA Championship Drum Major Awards. In 1976, while working as a graduate assistant under John P. Paynter at Northwestern University, he was instrumental in bringing the first color guard/flag corp to the Big Ten.

In 1993, Parks was inducted into the World Drum Corps Hall of Fame, for recognition of his work in the field of drum corps and mace technique.

=== University of Massachusetts ===
Parks became the director of the University of Massachusetts Minuteman Marching Band in 1977 at the age of 24, and built upon a strong program that had been headed by John Jenkins. Parks was a professor in the Department of Music and was the recipient of the university's Distinguished Teacher Award in 1989 and the Chancellor's Medal for Distinguished Service in 1997. The University's Alumni Association named him an honorary alumnus in 1997. At the time of his death, he was director of the band alongside Assistant Director Thom Hannum.

=== George N. Parks Drum Major Academy ===
Parks founded the George N. Parks Drum Major Academy, a summer program to train high school drum majors. Each summer, over 3,000 students attend the Band Leadership Training Seminar and Drum Major Academy.

=== Other work ===
In addition to his work at UMass Amherst and with his Drum Major Academy, Parks worked regularly with Bowl Games of America (BGA), where he assisted in the production of massed band halftime shows. He conducted BGA halftime shows at the Sugar Bowl, Orange Bowl, Gator Bowl, and the BCS National Championship Game. In 2005 and 2009, he was the director of the Bands of America Honor Band in the Tournament of Roses Parade.

== Personal life ==
Parks and his wife, Jeanne, married in 1979 in Point Pleasant, New Jersey. They have two children, Michael and Kyle.

== Death and legacy ==
Parks died from a heart attack on the evening of September 16, 2010. After a performance with the marching band at a Cuyahoga Falls High School football game, he collapsed while getting into a van. Paramedics were called again, and they transported him to Summa Western Reserve Hospital, where he was pronounced dead at 11:02 p.m.

Earlier in the day, Parks had been complaining about neck pain, and paramedics were called. According to Gary Guenther, chief investigator for the Summit County Medical Examiner, "When they got there, they checked him out," he said. "Mr. Parks apparently said he was feeling better and refused to go to the hospital." At the time of his death, he was en route to Ann Arbor, Michigan with the band for a football game on September 18 between UMass and the University of Michigan. He was honored on Homecoming Day on October 16, 2010 by current and former band members and staff. This included a performance by the alumni band, which included approximately 1,300 participants, the largest the university had ever seen.

== Awards and honors ==
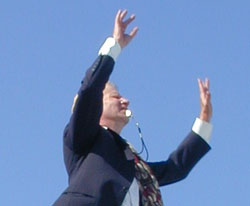
Parks conducting

Parks was inducted into the Massachusetts Instrumental and Choral Conductors Association Hall of Fame, the World Drum Corps Hall of Fame, The Bands of America Hall of Fame, and the Buccaneers Hall of Fame. Additionally, he received the Kappa Kappa Psi National Honorary Band Fraternity Distinguished Service to Music Medal, in the field of marching band, in October 2008. Parks was initiated into the Epsilon Nu chapter of Kappa Kappa Psi National Honorary Band Fraternity as an Honorary Member and the Delta Delta chapter of Tau Beta Sigma National Honorary Band Sorority as an Honorary Member.

The George N. Parks Minuteman Marching Band Building at the University of Massachusetts Amherst, which officially opened on Homecoming Weekend in November 2011, was named in Parks' honor. The name was chosen a year before his death and announced in Parks' presence at the groundbreaking in October 2009.

Following his death, Massachusetts Governor Deval Patrick named October 16, 2010 "George N. Parks Day", delivered by proclamation through state Sen. Stanley Rosenberg (himself a UMASS band alum), and instructed University of Massachusetts President Jack M. Wilson that the state flags be lowered to half-staff in Parks' honor.

== Published works ==
The Dynamic Drum Major (1984, Grove Weidenfeld; ISBN 978-99965-0-824-0 Cl Barnhouse Co/Music Pubs)

George N. Parks University of Massachusetts Minuteman Marching Band Born: May 23, 1953 Died: September 16, 2010
Preceded by John Jenkins	Band Director; 1977–2010	Succeeded by Thom Hannum (interim director)
