= Gayle Cook =

American business executive (1934–2025)

- Born: Gayle Karch; March 1, 1934; Evansville, Indiana, U.S.
- Died: August 17, 2025 (aged 91)
- Education: Indiana University Bloomington
- Occupations: Business executive; preservationist
- Spouse: William Cook (m. 1957; died 2011)
- Children: Carl

Gayle Cook (née Karch, March 1, 1934 – August 17, 2025) was an American businesswoman who in 1963 co-founded the Cook Group, a medical equipment manufacturing company, with her husband William Cook. In 2014, her net worth was estimated at US$5.8 billion.

== Early life and education ==
Gayle Karch was born on March 1, 1934, in Evansville, Indiana, the daughter of Arthur and Thelma Karch. She graduated Phi Beta Kappa from Indiana University Bloomington in 1956 with a bachelor's degree in fine arts.

== Career ==
In 1963, she and her husband William Cook co-founded the Cook Group, a medical equipment manufacturer. As of 2013, she still served on the company's board of directors.

According to Forbes, she had a net worth of $5.8 billion in 2014, up from $5.2 billion in 2013, placing her at #85 on the Forbes 400 for the year.

== Philanthropy ==
Cook made charitable contributions to her alma mater, Indiana University, and was on the board of the Indiana University Foundation. She received the Gertrude Rich Award in 1983 and an honorary doctorate in 1993, both from Indiana University.

She and her husband funded the restoration of many historic buildings, mainly in southern Indiana, including 40 that appear on the National Register of Historic Places. She was a co-founder of the Monroe County Historical Society Museum, a member of the Historic Landmarks Foundation of Indiana, and a landmark member of The Nature Conservancy.

== Personal life and death ==
Gayle Cook was married to William Cook from 1957 until his death in 2011. Their son, Carl Cook, succeeded William as CEO upon the latter's death. She also has a granddaughter. She co-authored two books on local landmarks, A Guide to Southern Indiana (1972, with William Cook) and Monroe County in Focus (1990, with Diana Hawes and Will Counts).

In March 1989, Cook was kidnapped and held for ransom by a failing investment broker named Arthur Curry. He was apprehended 26 hours later.

Cook died on August 17, 2025, at the age of 91.

== Bibliography ==
- A Guide to Southern Indiana (with William Cook, Owen Litho Service, 1972).
- Monroe County in Focus: Portrait of an Indiana County (with Diana Hawes and Will Counts, Discovery Press, 1990).
