= Blast! (musical) =

2000 Broadway musical

Blast! logo

Blast! is a Broadway production created by James Mason for Cook Group Incorporated, the director and organization formerly operating the Star of Indiana Drum and Bugle Corps.

It was the 2001 winner of the Tony Award for Best Special Theatrical Event, and simultaneously received an Emmy Award nomination for and won the 2001 Primetime Emmy Award for Outstanding Choreography.

Blast!'s instrumentation is exclusively brass and percussion, a nod to the show's roots in the drum and bugle corps activity. Blast!'s performers use trumpets, flugelhorns, mellophones, baritone horns, tubas, and a full complement of percussion instruments including snare drums, tenor drums, bass drums, xylophones, vibraphones, marimbas, timpani, and other standard percussion equipment. In addition, Blast! adds instruments not normally found in drum corps, such as French horns, concert euphoniums, trombones (including one on a unicycle during "Gee, Officer Krupke") and bass trombones, didgeridoos and synthesizers.

Blast! II Shockwave was written to include woodwind instruments, such as flute and saxophone. Accompanying the wind and percussion is the Visual Ensemble (or VE), a group of dancers who manipulate a variety of props, similar to a color guard.

== History ==
The Star of Indiana Drum and Bugle Corps, founded in 1984, competed in the Drum Corps International circuit from 1985 to 1993. It won the 1991 World Championship. After a showing in the 1993 season, the program left the DCI circuit to tour with the Canadian Brass, in a new program dubbed Brass Theater. On December 14, 1999, Blast! premiered at the Hammersmith Apollo in Hammersmith. A PBS special of the London production aired on August 5, 2000. Blast! debuted in the United States on August 23, 2000, at the Wang Center in Boston, Massachusetts.

On April 17, 2001, Blast! opened on Broadway at the Broadway Theatre, and later that year commenced its first national tour starting September 7 in St. Louis, Missouri.

A shortened version of the show, called The Power of BLAST!, played at the America Gardens Theatre at Epcot in Orlando, Florida, for the summer of 2001, before moving to the Hyperion Theater in Disney California Adventure in Anaheim, California, from November 22, 2001, until September 2, 2002.

Following the success of the original production, Blast! II Shockwave was developed and toured the United States in 2002–2003. This production added woodwind instruments. Shockwave has not been released on CD or DVD. The creators of Blast! also developed Cyberjam, which premiered in London at the Queen's Theatre in 2003. An additional sequel, MIX:Music in Xtreme, debuted in Japan in 2006 and toured Japan again in 2008. In 2016, Blast! developed and premiered Blast! The Music of Disney in Japan. Blast! The Music of Disney returned to Japan for additional tours in 2017 and 2019.

In 2024, control of the show’s future abroad expanded with license procured by Kyodo Tokyo for use in Japan only. Most of the original show’s content, set, and music returned in 2024 for a three month tour of Japan with the typical mix of Japanese and American cast members. This production replaced “Simple Gifts”/“Appalachian Spring” with a folk song, and replaced “Gee, Officer Krupke” with a new orchestration of J-pop duo Yoasobi’s 2023 hit “Idol”.

According to the show's website, the original show has not toured the United States since September 2020.

== Musical numbers ==
=== Blast! ===
==== Act One ====
Overture of color

- "Boléro" – (Maurice Ravel)

Violet

- "Villa Borghese" – (Ottorino Respighi) (performed 1999–2000)
- "Color Wheel" - (Jefferson Lee)
- "Split Complementaries" – (Josh Talbott)

Blue

- "Everybody Loves the Blues" – (Maynard Ferguson/Nicholas Lane)
- "Loss" – (Don Ellis)

Green

- "Simple Gifts"/"Appalachian Spring" – (Aaron Copland)

Black

- "Battery Battle" – (Thom Hannum/Jefferson Lee)
- "Medea" – (Samuel Barber)

==== Act Two ====
Color Wheel

- "Color Wheel Too" – (Jonathan Vanderkolff)

Yellow

- "Gee, Officer Krupke!" (from West Side Story) – (Leonard Bernstein/Stephen Sondheim)
- "Lemontechno" – (Jonathan Vanderkolff)

Orange

- "Tangerinamadidge" – (B. Epperson/Jonathan Vanderkolff)
- "Land of Make Believe" – (Chuck Mangione)
- "Marimba Spiritual"/"Earth Beat" – (Minoru Miki/Michael Spiro)

Red

- "Malagueña" – (Ernesto Lecuona)

Recent editions of Blast! have omitted "Simple Gifts" and "Gee, Officer Krupke!", and moved "Tangerinamadidge" immediately before "Lemontechno".

=== Blast! II Shockwave ===
==== Act One ====
- "Starburst" – (E. Finkel/Gene Krupa)
- "Prelude, Fugue, and Riffs" – (Leonard Bernstein)
- "First Circle" – (L. Mays/Pat Metheny)
- "Blue Rondo à la Turk" – (Dave Brubeck)
- "Guaguanco" – (Arturo Sandoval)
- "God Bless the Child" – (Arthur Herzog Jr./Billie Holiday)
- "Drum, Drum, Drum" – (Louis Prima/B. Dubinski/D. Delucia/Jefferson Lee)
- "Adagio for Strings" – (Samuel Barber)
- "Channel One Suite" – (W. Reddie)

==== Act Two ====
- "Excerpts from Carmina Burana" – (Carl Orff)
- "Good Vibrations" – (Brian Wilson/The Beach Boys)
- "Star Children" – (Don Ellis)
- "Uninvited" – (Alanis Morissette)
- "Turkish Bath" – (Don Ellis)
- "Bohemian Rhapsody" – (Freddie Mercury)
- "Lullaby for Nancy Carol" – (Chuck Mangione)
- "Swing, Swing, Swing" – (John Williams)

=== MIX: Music in Xtreme ===
Act One

- "Ourverture" – (V. Corradi)
- "Shapes" – (Jefferson Lee)
- "Blue Rondo à la Turk" – (David Brubeck)
- "The Lady from 29 Palms" – (Allie Wrubel/Frank Sinatra)
- "Night on Bald Mountain" – (Nikolai Rimsky-Korsakov, Modest Mussorgsky)
- "Tribal Towers" – (Jefferson Lee)
- "Malaga" – (B. Holman)

Act Two

- "o2" – (Jonathan Vanderkolff)
- "Didgeritoo" – (James Mason, Jefferson Lee, Jonathan Vanderkolff)
- "Star Children" – (Don Ellis)
- "Uninvited" – (Alanis Morissette)
- "Turkish Re-Mix" – (Jonathan Vanderkolff, Jefferson Lee)
- "Turkish Bath" – (Don Ellis)
- "Open Wide" – (Don Ellis)
- "Lullaby for Nancy Carol" – (Chuck Mangione)
- "Encore" – (Jefferson Lee)

=== The Power of BLAST! ===
Epcot version

- "Boléro" – (Maurice Ravel)
- "Color Wheel" – (Jefferson Lee)
- "Battery Battle" – (T. Hannum/Jefferson Lee)
- "Land of Make Believe" – (Chuck Mangione)
- "Malagueña" – (Ernesto Lecuona)

Disney California Adventure version

- "Boléro" – (Maurice Ravel)
- "Battery Battle" – (T. Hannum/Jefferson Lee)
- "Lemontechno" – (Jonathan Vanderkolff)
- "Land of Make Believe" – (Chuck Mangione)
- "Malagueña" – (Ernesto Lecuona)

=== BLAST! The Music of Disney ===
Act I

- "When You Wish Upon a Star" – (Ned Washington/Leigh Harline)
- "The Sorcerer's Apprentice" – (Paul Dukas)
- "A Dream Is a Wish Your Heart Makes" – (Mack David, Al Hoffman and Jerry Livingston)
- "I Wan'na Be Like You" – (Richard M. Sherman/Robert B.Sherman)
- "Bibbidi-Bobbidi-Boo" – (Mack David, Al Hoffman and Jerry Livingston)
- "Reflection" - (David Zippel/Matthew Wilder)
- "Rhapsody in Blue" – (George Gershwin)
- "Storm" (Medley of music from Moana, Bambi, Aladdin, and Tarzan)
- "Steps in Time" – (Richard M. Sherman/Robert B.Sherman)

Act II

- "Circle of Life" – (Tim Rice/Elton John)
- "Be Our Guest" – (Howard Ashman/Alan Menken)
- "Train Tech" (Original musical track featuring the Main Street Electrical Parade theme)
- "Part of Your World / Under the Sea" - (Howard Ashman/Alan Menken)
- "He's a Pirate" – (Klaus Badelt/Geoffrey Zanelli/Hans Zimmer)
- "The Mob Song" – (Howard Ashman/Alan Menken)
- "Seize the Day" – (Jack Feldman/Alan Menken)
- "Trip a Little Light Fantastic" – (Scott Wittman/Marc Shaiman)
- ENCORE: "Friend Like Me" – (Howard Ashman/Alan Menken)

Musical numbers listed in the souvenir program for early productions of Blast! The Music of Disney included "Night on Bald Mountain", "Let It Go", and "How Far I'll Go".

== See also ==
- Drumline Live
