= Cook Group =

American medical technology company

Cook Group Incorporated
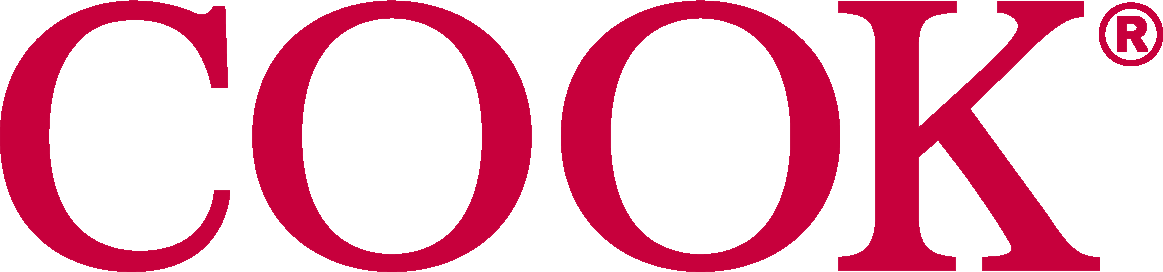
- Company type: privately held company
- Industry: medical device, Building Materials, Manufacturing, Plastic, Packaging & Containers.
- Founded: 1963
- Founder: William A. "Bill" Cook
- Headquarters: Bloomington, Indiana, USA
- Area served: worldwide
- Key people: Gayle Cook (Co-Founder); Carl Cook (CEO); Pete Yonkman
- Revenue: Over $2 billion
- Number of employees: Over 12,000
- Subsidiaries: Cook Medical; Cook Properties; Cook Services

Cook Group Incorporated is an American privately held company based in Bloomington, Indiana, and primarily involved in manufacturing of medical devices. It was ranked #324 in Forbes' 2008 America's Largest Private Companies. It has three main divisions: Cook Medical, Cook Services and Cook Properties. All three divisions are made up of several subsidiary companies.

== History ==
The flagship company, Cook Incorporated, part of the medical division, was founded in 1963 in a spare bedroom in Bloomington, Indiana The first products of Cook Incorporated included catheters, needles, and wire guides. As of 2014, the company manufactured more than 16,000 products across 10 hospital service lines, and serves 135 countries. Other companies include the manufacturers K-Tube and Cook Polymer Technology. Cook owns CFC Properties, a property development company that owns residential and commercial properties in Bloomington as well as Fountain Square Mall and Grant Street Inn. Cook also restored and owns the French Lick Resort, which includes the historic West Baden Springs Hotel and the French Lick Springs Hotel.

In September 2017, Catalent purchased Cook Pharmica for $950 million. In February 2022, Cook Medical sold its Reproductive Health business to The Cooper Companies for $875 million.

== Subsidiaries ==
=== Medical manufacturing ===
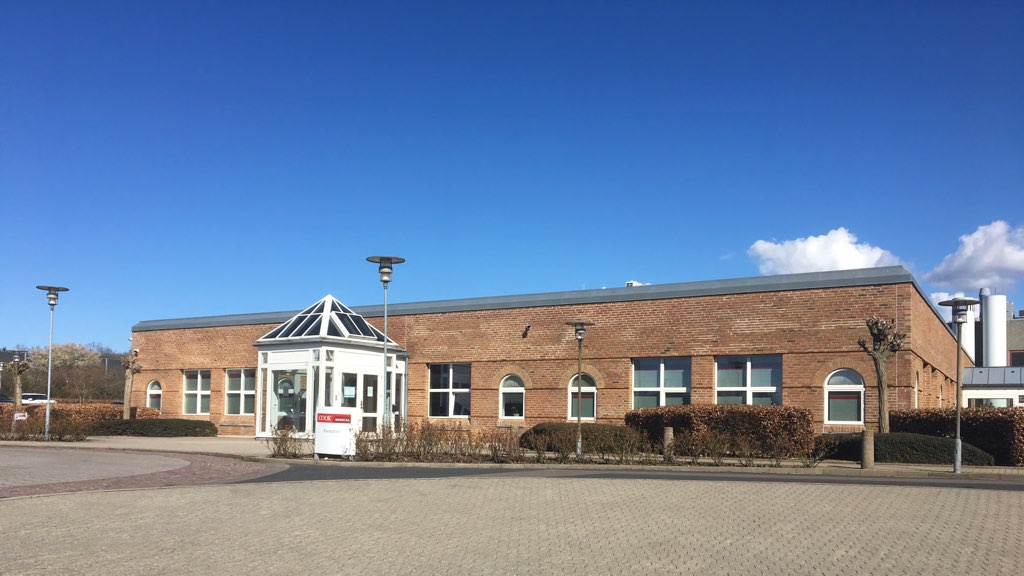
Cook Medical in Denmark, part of William Cook Europe ApS

- Cook Incorporated
- Cook Research Incorporated
- Cook Urological Incorporated
- Cook MyoSite
- MED Institute, Inc.
- Cook Biotech Incorporated
- Cook Endoscopy
- Cook Vascular Incorporated
- William Cook Europe ApS
- William A. Cook Australia Pty. Ltd.
- Cook Ireland Ltd.

=== Allied manufacturing ===
- Sabin Corporation now Cook Polymer Technology
- K-Tube Corporation

=== Affiliates ===
- CFC, Inc.
  - Fountain Square Mall
  - Grant Street Inn
- Cook Aviation Inc.
- Cook Travel
- Cook Family Health Center Inc.
