= Umass Band =

The term "Umass band" can refer to two marching bands in the University of Massachusetts system:

- University of Massachusetts Minuteman Marching Band
- University of Massachusetts Lowell Riverhawk Marching Band
