= George N. Parks Minuteman Marching Band Building =

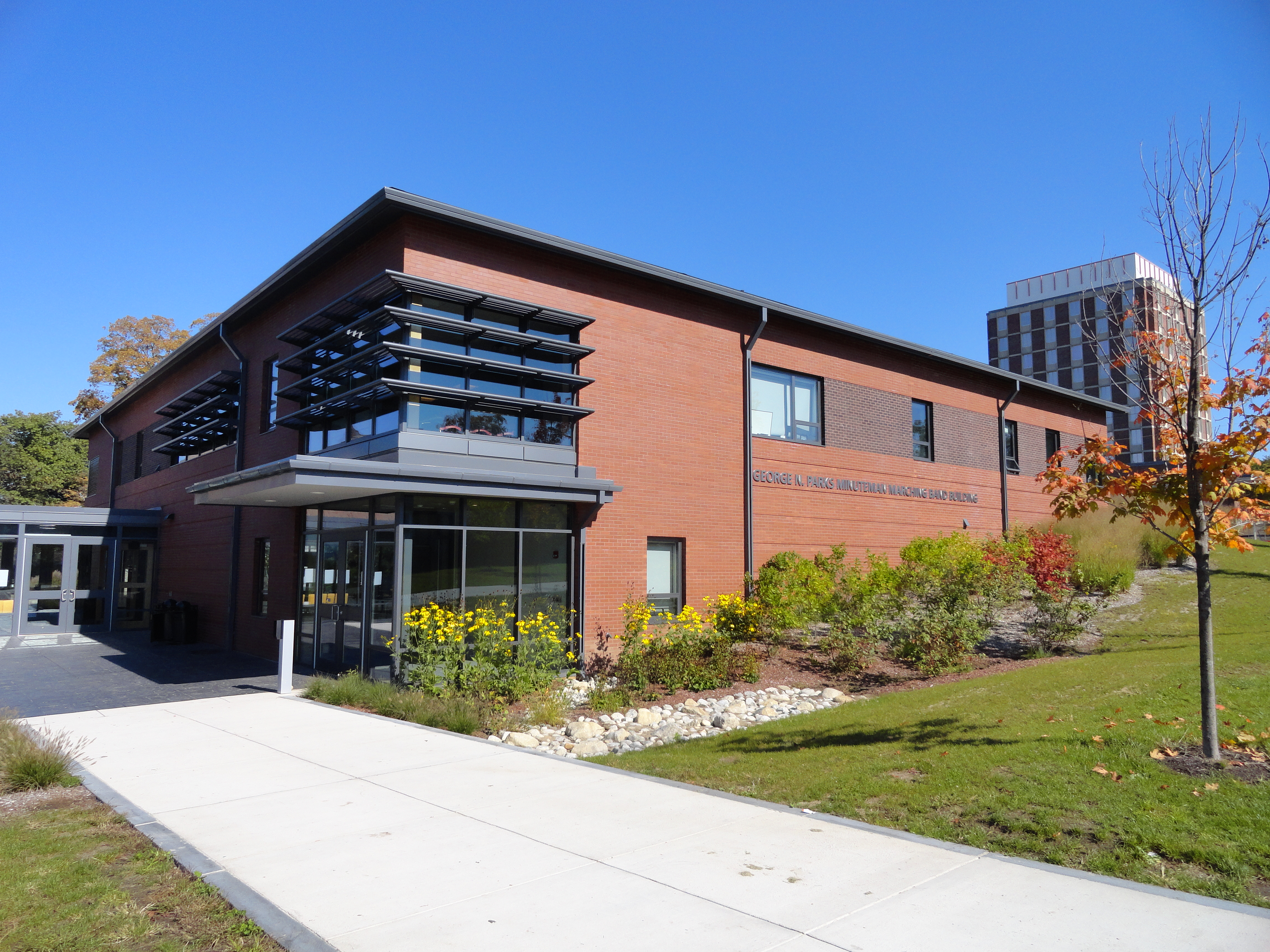
- The building in 2011
- Interactive map of the George N. Parks Minuteman Marching Band Building area

General information
- Type: Rehearsal Hall, offices, storage space, music classroom
- Location: Amherst, Massachusetts
- Coordinates: 42°23′22.75″N 72°31′50.38″W
- Current tenants: University of Massachusetts Minuteman Marching Band
- Construction started: Spring, 2010
- Completed: Summer, 2011

Technical details
- Floor count: 2
- Floor area: 15000 SF

Design and construction
- Architect: Kuhn Riddle Architects
- Main contractor: Eastern General Contractors, Inc.

The George N. Parks Minuteman Marching Band Building is the home of the University of Massachusetts Minuteman Marching Band. It is connected to the Grinnell Arena and provides a home for the 350(+) student band. It is named after the late director George N. Parks.

== Background ==
In 1997, the Old Chapel, the home of the band for many years was closed due to structural instabilities. The school then transferred the offices of the band to the University Apartments, which at this time were vacant. The university quickly renovated Grinnell Arena for the use of the Marching Band. Grinnell Arena was renovated by Eastern General Contractors, Inc. of Springfield, MA, the same contractor that would 12 years later build the new George N. Parks Minuteman Marching Band Building. In the late 2000s, the university announced plans to demolish the University Apartments and the band offices were then moved to Arnold House. Sometime during this period plans were announced for a permanent marching band home.

== Building ==
The 5.7 million dollar building has been financed with 1.2 million in private donations and 4.5 million of university funds. During his lifetime, namesake George N. Parks worked to raise much of the private donations. It is the band's first permanent home since 1997 when they could no longer use Old Chapel. The facility contains practice rooms for the band, storage space for instruments and uniforms, and offices for the administration. It is also connected to the nearby Grinnell Arena, the practice area for the percussion section. In addition, the building is energy efficient and eco-friendly. Groundbreaking for the facility occurred in October 2009, with construction beginning in April of the following year. Following the spring concert on April 16, 2011, the band held a "soft opening" where the band members and the general public was invited to see the building which was still under construction. An official opening was held on November 5, 2011, the day of homecoming.
