= University of Massachusetts Minuteman Marching Band =

College marching band in Amherst, Massachusetts

Minuteman Marching Band
- Nickname: The Power and Class of New England
- School: University of Massachusetts Amherst
- Location: Amherst, MA
- Founded: 1873
- Director: TBA (Note: On May 11th, 2026, it was announced that former director Dr. Anderson is transitioning out of his role. The band is now led by an interim leadership team consisting of Hale, Sirard, as well as former TA Hudson Moore.)
- Associate Director: Ian Hale
- Assistant Director: Chris McHugh Sirard
- Members: 415+
- Practice field: McGuirk Alumni Stadium
- Fight song: "Fight Mass"
- Website: umass.edu/band

The University of Massachusetts Minuteman Marching Band (UMMB) is the marching band for the University of Massachusetts Amherst known for its drum corps style and nationally renowned percussion section. The Minuteman Band is also known for its use of dance routines, vocalists, electronics, and overall showmanship.

The Minuteman Band plays halftime and post-game shows at all home football games and a variety of away games, parades, and exhibitions each season. The band has performed internationally in Canada and Ireland, at Ronald Reagan's and George W. Bush's inaugurations, the Macy's Thanksgiving Parade, and the Rose Parade. The Minuteman Band has also given five exhibition performances at the annual Bands of America Grand National Championships and performed at 15 pro football games. The band has performed at the annual Collegiate Marching Band Festival in Allentown, Pennsylvania since the festival's inception in 1995 to 2019.

The UMass Band ethos was captured in the 1994 documentary "Building Power and Class", broadcast on PBS affiliates in Massachusetts and Pennsylvania. In 1998, the Minuteman Marching Band was awarded the prestigious Sudler Trophy, the highest honor that can be bestowed upon a collegiate marching band. In 2003, band alumna and former drum major Kerstin Becker published "Through These Doors," a coffee-table size book chronicling the history of the Minuteman Band.

The band was directed by George N. Parks from 1981 until his sudden death in September 2010; prompting Assistant Director Thom Hannum to be named interim director, assisted by Michael Klesch. Timothy Todd Anderson was named director of the band in 2011.

In 2011, the George N. Parks Minuteman Marching Band Building was completed, giving the band its first home since the Old Chapel was closed in 1997.

== History ==
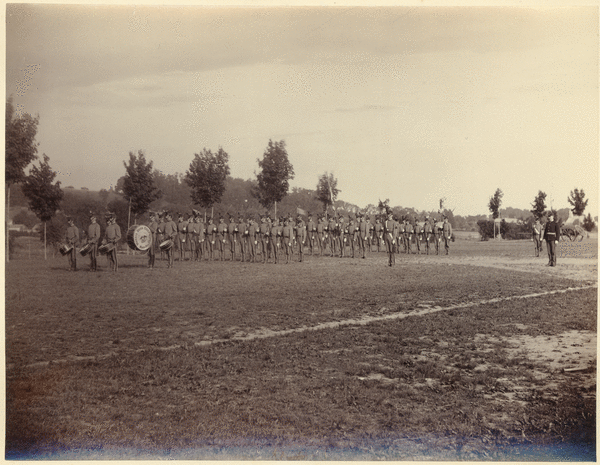
The Morris Drum Corps in 1881

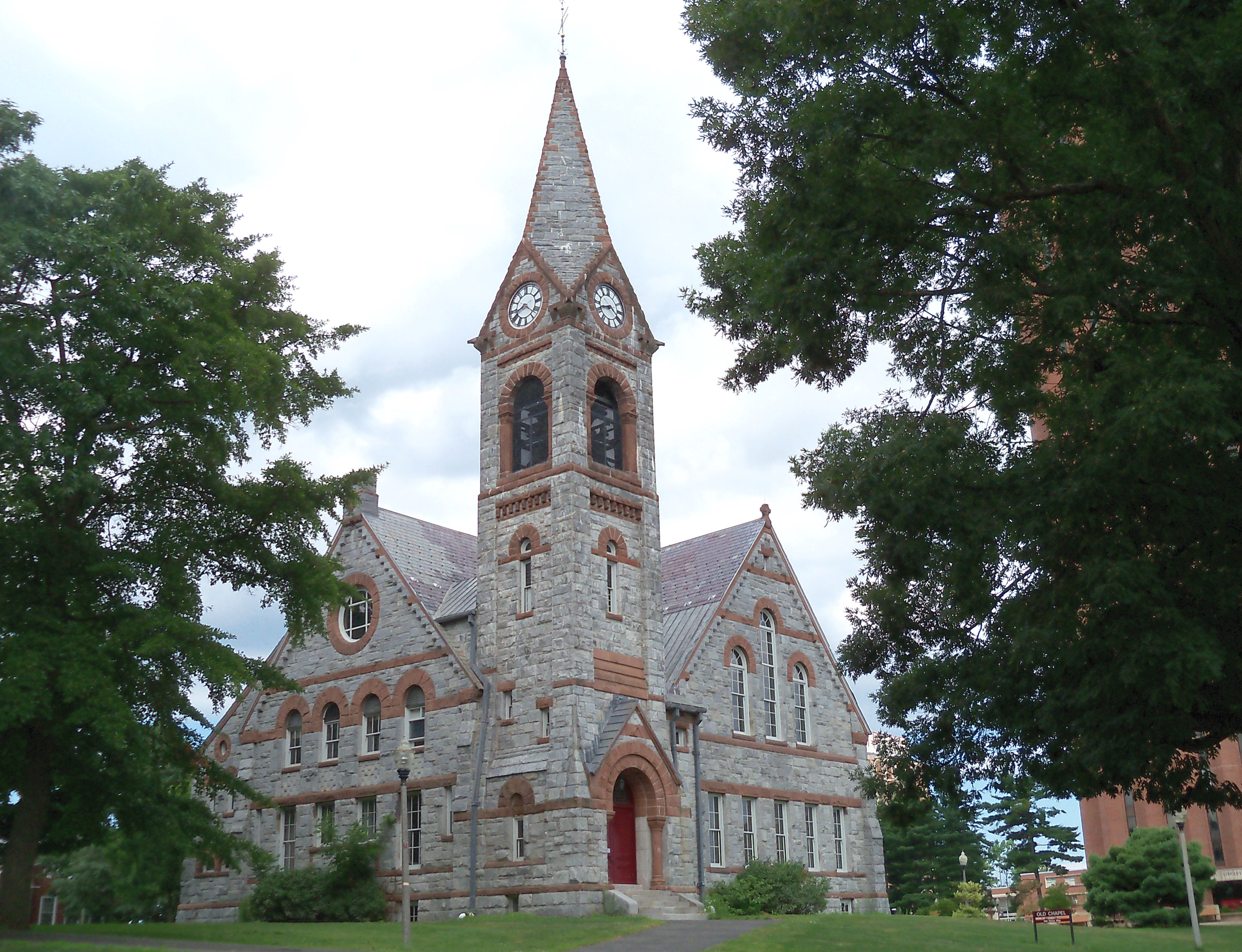
Old Chapel, home of the band for many years

The band program at University of Massachusetts Amherst started in 1873 when the university was known as the Massachusetts Agricultural College. The Morris Drum Corps, as it was known, was the first resemblance of a marching band at the school, and it was directed by First Lieutenant Charles Morris of the 5th Army Artillery.

In the 1890s, the band was renamed the Clark Memorial Cadet Band after former college president William S. Clark. At the close of the century the band's instrumentation expanded, but the musicians consisted only of military cadets.

In 1931, the Massachusetts Agricultural College, or "Aggie", became the Massachusetts State College. Soon after, in 1934, the College hired its first music instructor, Frank Stratton. A year later, Massachusetts Agricultural College started to organize a formal band program, and appointed its first non-military band instructor, Charles Farnum. The newly created band became known as the "Redmen Marching Band". In 1938, the band had its most successful season to date by playing at all home games and an away game versus the United States Coast Guard Academy. During World War II, all bands at the university were disbanded from March 1943 until September 1945 because many of the members served in the military.

After the war, the band remained small, so the director set out to create a female "drill team" to augment the band. In 1946, this team expanded to a size of 44. This drill team was given the name of the "Precisionettes" in 1952.

In 1947 the Massachusetts State College became the University of Massachusetts. The band's name changed from the Redmen Marching Band to the Minuteman Marching Band in the 1970s under the leadership of Professor John Jenkins. Jenkins brought a new style of marching, high step rapid rhythm (thighs parallel to the ground) to UMass from the University of Michigan, and composer Jerry Bilik, who notably wrote the "Fight Mass" fight song. In 1977, George N. Parks was hired to direct the band. Parks brought the roll-step marching style and fostered the reputation that the band has today. His unique styles and intensity were widely praised.

Until 1997, the band was housed in Old Chapel on campus. From then, and until the October 17, 2009 groundbreaking of a marching band specific building, the band utilized a variety of campus locations for space. The university named the building in honor of George Parks.

In 2010, George Parks suffered a heart attack while traveling with the band to the University of Michigan. Associate director Thom Hannum was named interim director. In 2011, Timothy Todd Anderson was named permanent Director and Professor Hannum resumed his role as Associate Director. Christine McHugh Sirard was named Assistant Director in 2015, and serves as director of the color guard.

In May 2021, it was announced that UMass alumnus Ian Hale will be replacing Thom Hannum as Associate Director and head of percussion beginning August 2, 2021.

In October 2025, it was announced that Dr. Timothy Todd Anderson was placed on leave, and in early 2026 his name was removed from the band's website. The band was co-directed by associate directors Ian Hale and Christine McHugh Sirard for the remainder of the year, and for its 2026-2027 season will be led by interim leadership Hale (Percussion), Sirard (Visual Coordination and Color Guard), as well as former TA Hudson Moore (Brass and Woodwinds).

=== Minuteman Band Hall of Fame ===
Many former band members and other figures have been elected to the Minuteman Band Hall of Fame by its alumni association since 1993. Induction years listed in parentheses.

- Lloyd Henley (2025)
- BethAyn Curtis (2025)
- Chancellor Kumble R. Subbaswamy (2022)
- Kappa Kappa Psi - Epsilon Nu & Tau Beta Sigma - Delta Delta (2019)
- Kristi Ochs (2019)
- Christine McHugh Sirard (2018)
- Jim Kierstead (2017)
- Keith Paul (2017)
- Walter Chesnut (2016)
- Sally Johnson (2016)
- Jamin Carroll (2016)
- John Leonard (2014)
- Rob Hammerton (2013)
- Jason DeGroff (2012)
- Doric Alviani (2011)
- UMass Amherst Alumni Association (2011)
- Linda Hannum (2009)
- Colin McNutt (2009)
- Brian Carroll (2006)
- Gerry Grady (2005)
- Jim MacRostie (2005)
- Dave Hautanen (2002)
- Michael Klesch (1999)
- Heidi Sarver (1997)
- Bob Bertram (1996)
- Thom Hannum (1996)
- Joe Contino (1995)
- John Jenkins (1994)
- George Parks (1993)

== Leadership and Sections ==
=== Directors ===
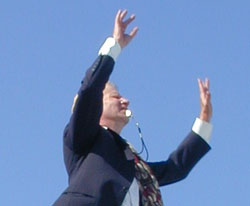
Parks, in 2003

- Charles Morris (1861-???)
- Charles Farnum (1935–1945)
- Doric Alviani (1945–1949)
- Ezra Schabas (1949–1950)
- Joseph Contino (1950–1963)
- John Jenkins (1963–1977)
- Larry V. Weed (1970–1971)
- George N. Parks (1977–2010)
- Thom Hannum (interim director 2010–2011)
- Timothy Todd Anderson (2011–2026) (Note: As of October 2025, Dr. Anderson was placed on leave. The decision was made permanent on May 11th, 2026, and the band is currently led by an interim leadership team.)

=== Student Staff ===
Student leadership has a major role in the UMMB. The UMMB is composed of student run administrative staff as well as field staff. Students in these roles are responsible for many aspects of the band on and off the field.

==== Drum Majors ====
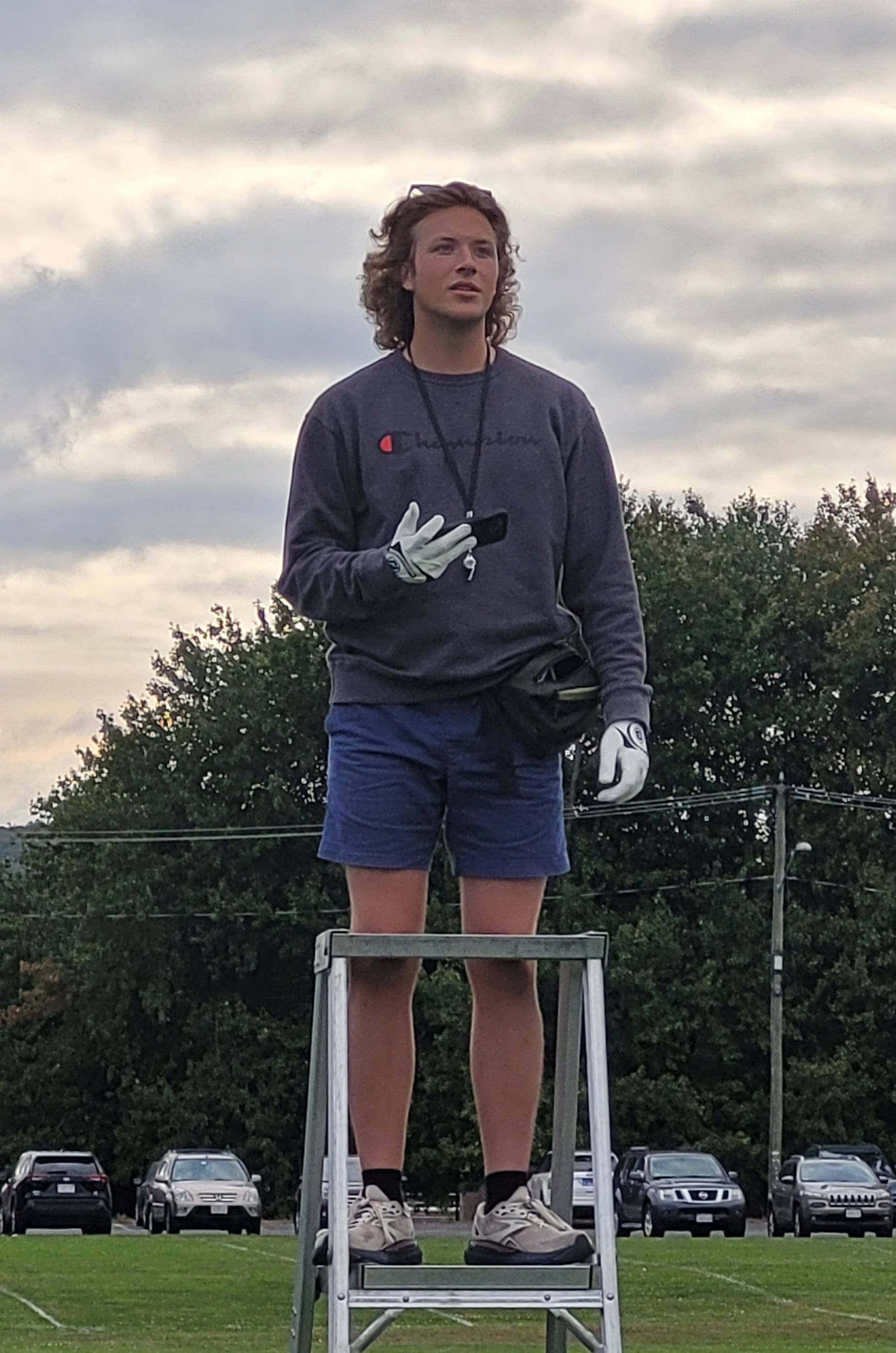
Drum major Brayden Hackett helping the band "check and adjust" their drill during an evening rehearsal on the band's practice fields.

As of the 2026 season, the current Drum majors are Brayden Hackett, Jack Chisholm, Nicole Ramirez, Rachel Morina, and Anna Adcox.

==== Executive Staff / Ad Staff ====
Students can take on leadership roles within the band such as band manager, travel manager, and personnel manager. There is also administrative staff roles which include web staff, AV staff, merchandise staff, uniform staff, PR staff, historian staff, equipment staff, and library staff.

=== Instrumentation ===
The Minuteman Band consists of typical marching band instruments: piccolos, flutes, clarinets, alto, tenor, and baritone saxophones, trumpets, mellophones, trombones, marching baritone horns, and sousaphones.

In addition to the instrumentation on the field, the band has a front ensemble and sometimes features a small-group horn section and singers. The wind and guard sections of the band do not require auditions for their members, however some instruments like the piccolo, guitar, bass, and vocals require an audition which is open to any band member. The twirlers, drum line and front ensemble are auditioned. Since the 2024 season, the UMass Dance Team has joined the band's membership.

=== Style ===
The Minuteman Band's style is that of a drum corps, forming precise drill sets and shapes. However, The UMMB is known for its "dance-like moves" and tends to mix them in with the more traditional marching styles. The main show theme usually includes traditional marching band styles with some songs that are looser and less rigid. The band's use of amplification with electric guitars and other percussion often gives the band the reputation as a non-traditional marching band.

=== Colorguard and Twirlers ===
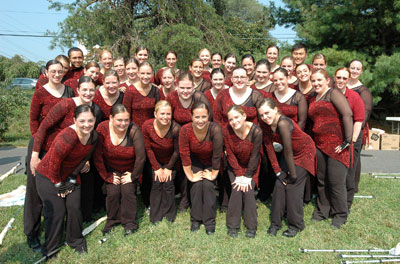
The UMMB colorguard during the 2006 season

The UMass Colorguard and Twirlers are the visual sections in the University of Massachusetts Minuteman Marching Band, the Power and Class of New England. The Colorguard is led by Chris McHugh Sirard and is a fully modernized ensemble utilizing flag, rifle, sabre, dance, and alternative equipment.

The UMass colorguard began in 1974 and has been performing alongside the UMMB ever since. The UMMB and Colorguard perform at halftime and during post-game at all home football games and frequently travels to away games. The band has also performed at Bands of America in 1993, 2001, 2004, 2007 and 2011. As of the 2019 season, there were over 40 members in the UMass colorguard.

The twirlers are led by Kristi Ochs. They incorporate baton, dance, and ribbon into their routines.

=== Percussion ===
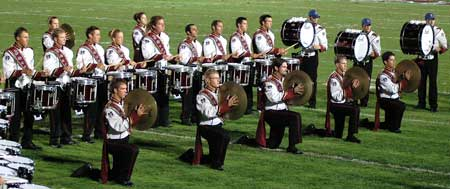
The UMass Drumline

The percussion section was most notably instructed by DCI hall-of-famer Thom Hannum until 2021 when Ian Hale was named the new head of percussion.

The UMass Drumline is also known for many of its alumni who have branched out into many teaching and writing opportunities in percussive arts throughout the nation. This includes Hale who has worked with Madison Scouts, Carolina Crown, Cadets Drum and Bugle Corps, and Boston Crusaders Drum and Bugle Corps prior to his role as head of percussion and associate director.

=== Band Culture ===
Each instrument section of the band takes on its own unique identity, featuring Greek letters, various traditions, and section attire that help create community within the band.

Flutes/Piccolos: The Flute section's Greek letters are ΒΣΛ. The flutes are known for their "Sparkle Hut" and wear red ribbons in their hair on gamedays and other performances.

Clarinets: The Clarinet section (also known as Netline Bestline) has the Greek letters ΛΒΣ. The clarinets wear purple bandanas on gamedays and other performances.

Alto Saxophones: The alto saxophone section (heard when chanting "Fish, Fish, Fish!") has the Greek letters ΣΑΧ. The altos wear red bandanas on gamedays and other performances.

Tenor Saxophones: The tenor saxophone section has the Greek letters ΣΔΜ. Tenors wear black bandanas on gamedays and other performances.

Baritone Saxophones: The baritone saxophone section has the Greek letters ΒΦΣ. The "baris" wear blue and white bandanas on gamedays and other performances.

Trumpets: The trumpet section (also known as the Hogline) does not have Greek letters, but instead has the quasi-Latin phrase "Hogo Ergo Sum", a play on Descartes' cogito, ergo sum. The trumpets (members are called Hogs) wear thin red elastic bands on gamedays and other performances.

Mellophones: The mellophone section (also known as mellos) have the greek letters ΜΔΣ, and they are known for promoting "tuning time" as "Confidence O'Clock". The mellos wear yellow bandanas on gamedays and other performances.

Trombones: The trombone section (also called the Bones) has a combination of Greek letters and symbols, Δ#$. The trombones wear green bucket hats on gamedays and other performances.

Marching Baritones: The marching baritone section has the Greek letters ΕΥΦ and calls itself "the Euphs" (named after the euphonium) and has the proper name "EuphMass" (taken once again from euphonium and combined with the similar-sounding "UMass"). The euphs wear camouflage bandanas on gamedays and other performances.

Sousaphones: The sousaphones, who call themselves the Tubas or T-SUBs, do not have Greek letters; Their symbol is called the "Super-T" and is similar to Superman's logo replaced with a T. The sousaphones wear sunglasses on gamedays and other performances.

Percussion: The drumline and front ensemble host the Greek letters ΦΒΔ. In rehearsals and some performances, snares wear Philadelphia Phillies hats, tenor drums wear Atlanta Braves hats, basses wear Boston Red Sox hats, and cymbals wear "Life is Good" hats. The members of the percussion section also have sweatshirts and shirts emblazoned with their Greek letters.

The band also hosts many different traditions at games, performances, and during/after rehearsals. Events such as Trombone Friday, Banana Wednesday, and section dinners bring band spirit and morale up. As the band marches during the drumline cadence, each section creates "shenanigans" that they will perform during the cadence. These are often small sayings and phrases that are included alongside the cadence that often have very little or no meaning and bring life and energy to the cadence, for the band members and audience alike.

== Recent Seasons ==
=== 2003-2007 ===
The 2003 Season show consisted of a mix of songs with no clearly set theme. It has sometimes been called "Hot Jazz". Among the songs were "Birdland", "El Boro", "Legend of the One Eyed Sailor", "Get it On", and Gloria Estefan's "Oye Tu Conga". The pit was featured on a version of Radiohead's "Paranoid Android". The band went to Delaware, Allentown, MICCA Regionals in Bridgeport, CT., and to a post-season game at Colgate.

The 2004 Season show consisted of music from the musical West Side Story and songs written by Elton John. Notable performances included the Bands of America Grand Nationals at the RCA Dome in Indianapolis, Indiana where they also performed the song "God Bless the USA" as backing band for Lee Greenwood. A smaller group of the band also performed at the Boston Public Library for a private event celebrating William Bulger's 70th birthday.

The 2005 season consisted of music from the movie Troy and the band Earth, Wind, and Fire. Among the notable performances during this season, the band played at the football game between UMass and the United States Army at West Point. During this performance, the band played Lee Greenwood's "God Bless the USA" in honor of the armed forces. They also performed at Symphony Hall in Boston.

The mellophone section during a halftime show in 2006

The Minuteman Band's main show for 2006 contained music from Henry V and the band Chicago. Performances included the UMass football games against the US Navy and the Canadian national football league playoff game in Montreal. The band's normal season was extended because UMass's football team made the playoffs. The band played their final halftime show of the 2006 post season in Chattanooga, Tennessee, at the NCAA National Championship game vs. Appalachian State University. They also performed at Symphony Hall in Boston and for a ceremony celebrating the awarding of the Nobel Prize in Medicine to Dr. Craig Mello at the DCU Center in Worcester, Mass for which both the Governor and Lieutenant Governor were in attendance.

2007's show included Russian Christmas Music, "Rhapsody in Blue", and three hits by Gloria Estefan including "Anything for You", "Oye tu Conga" and "Get on your Feet".

In 2007, the Band performed in Allentown, Pennsylvania, all home UMass Football games, and the National Bands of America in Indianapolis.

=== 2008-2012 ===
The 2008 show contained the fifth movement of Hector Berlioz's Symphonie fantastique, an abridged version of Billy Joel's "And So It Goes", Dave Weckl's "Tiempo de Festival" (performed as the percussion feature), and a medley of Stevie Wonder songs ("Uptight (Everything's Alright)", "Don't You Worry 'bout a Thing", "For Once In My Life", and "Fingertips"). "Mon Homme" (known by its English title "My Man") and "Stars and Stripes Forever" were arranged for the season's performance with University of Delaware Fightin' Blue Hen Marching Band, and a medley of patriotic songs was performed during the final two home football games. The final home football game also featured a performance of "Malagueña".

Performance locations in 2008 included Allentown, Pennsylvania, Faneuil Hall, the West Boyleston Parade and Field Show, and the MICCA High School Marching Band Championships. The band performed at all home football games, as well as two away games at College of the Holy Cross and Northeastern University.

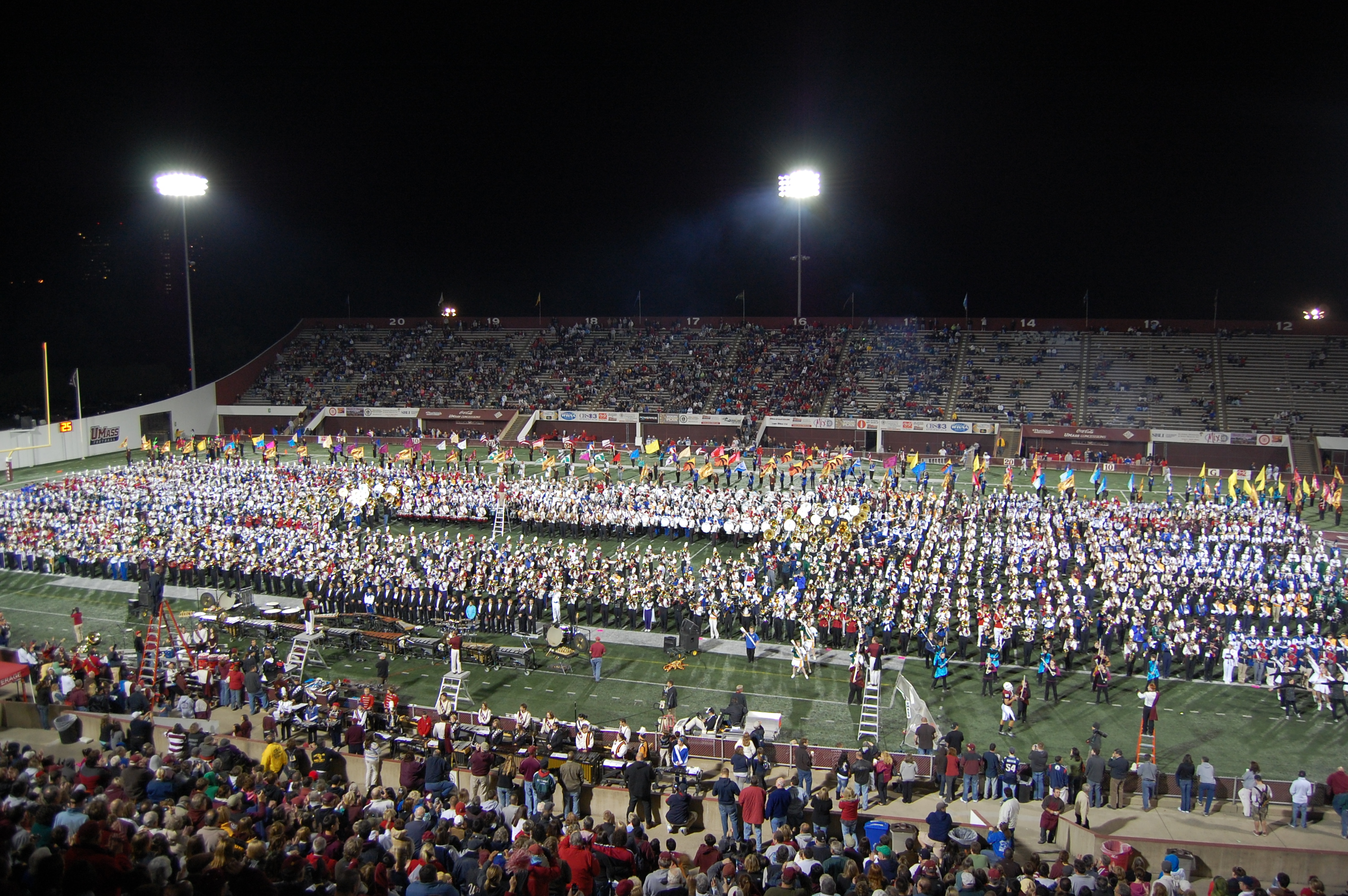
Band Day, in 2009

The fall 2009 show featured music from the Disney Motion Picture Pirates of the Caribbean. Selections included "Jack Sparrow", "The Kraken", "Davy Jones" and "He's a Pirate". Other featured selections included "Swing Street" By Barry Manilow and Tchaikovsky's "1812 Overture". The percussion section headlined "Won't You Come Home, Bill Bailey". The show was debuted on September 12, 2009, at halftime of the Albany game. During band camp, the band recorded a music video with the group Stephen Kellogg and the Sixers for their newest song at the time "Shady Esperanto and the Young Hearts". The group choose to use the Marching Band in the video because several members of the Sixers are Alumni of the university and the marching band.

The fall 2010 show featured music from the motion picture The Wind and the Lion as well as a medley of Madonna songs. The selection from the movie included "The Wind and The Lion". Other music included "Canto Del Viento", the percussion feature "Oye Tu Conga", and Madonna's "Like a Prayer". Later shows in the season added arrangements of I'll Be There by The Jackson 5 and When the Saints Go Marching In. Parts of the show were debuted on September 4, 2010, at halftime of the William and Mary game. The fall 2010 season included performances in Allentown and a game at the University of Michigan.

On September 16, 2010, while in Cuyahoga Falls, Ohio, George N. Parks suffered a fatal heart attack after the band's performance for the local high school and opposing team's band. The band played for the high schoolers as a "thank you" for being allowed to use their facilities during a stopover on the Michigan trip. The band decided to go ahead to Michigan, and performed to great success in front of 110,187 people, the largest audience in the band's history. When the band returned to Cuyahoga Falls on their way home, the town provided a banquet when the band arrived, and a police escort when they departed the next day.

Two weeks after Michigan, the band performed in Allentown. The following week, for Homecoming, the school held a two-hour tribute in the Mullins Center for Parks before that day's football game. For halftime, an alumni band composed of almost 1,000 past members performed first a tune, and then a combined performance with current members of the band. In all, almost 1,300 members past and present were on the field for this performance. The next week the band attended an away game versus the University of New Hampshire at Gillette Stadium for the Colonial Clash. The band performed at MICCA Finals in Lowell, MA the day after. The twenty-sixth annual Band Day occurred two weeks later. Almost three thousand students from elementary through high school were in attendance. The next week, the band performed their field show for the last time for Senior Day.

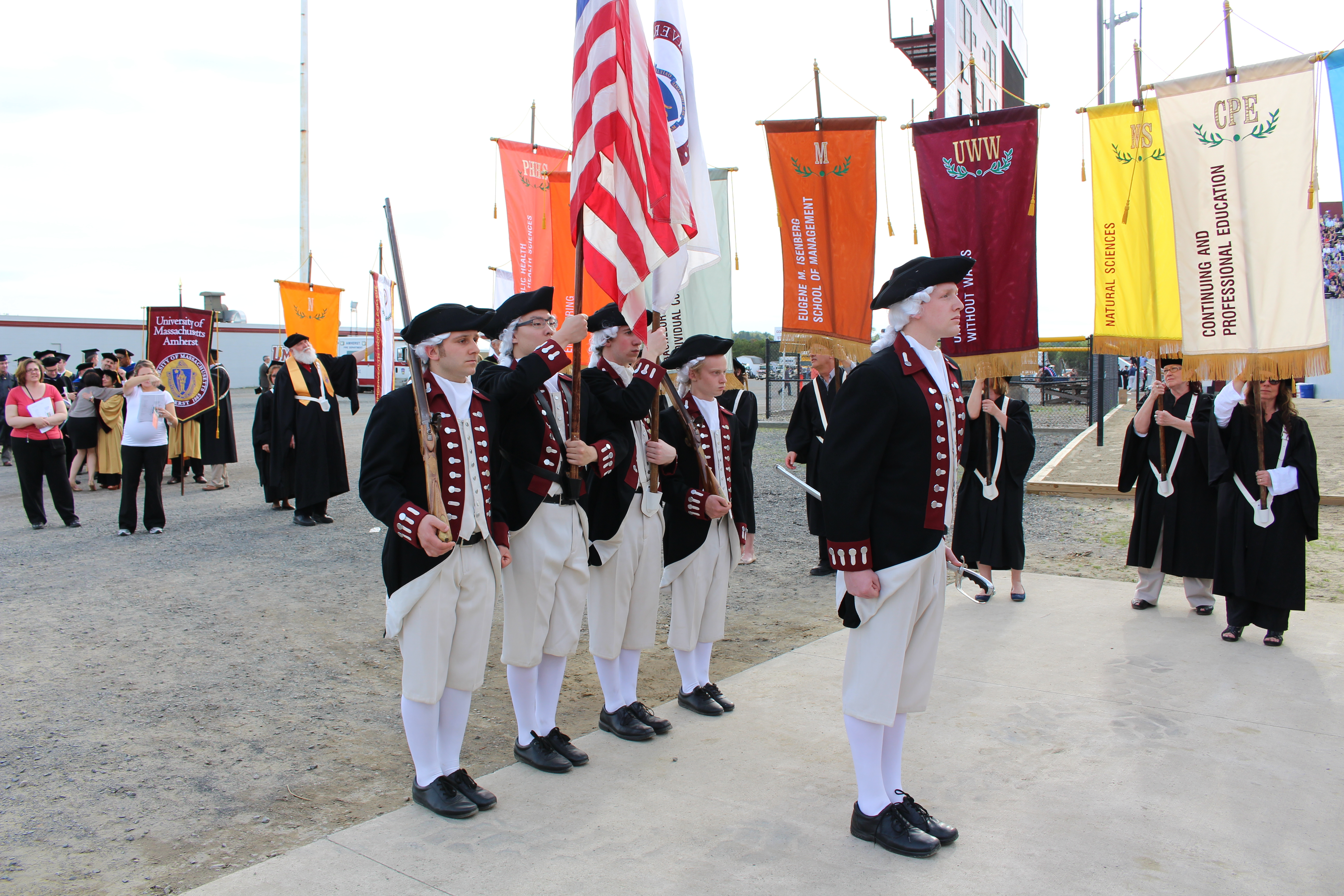
2012 Honor Guard members at 2013 commencement ceremonies

The 2011 season opened on September 17 during a home game. The first song in the show was an adaptation of Dreams of a Witches' Sabbath, written by Hector Berlioz in 1830. The next song was You Can't Stop the Beat, from the musical Hairspray. The next song was the 1812 Overture, and this is followed by Big Noise from Winnetka. On Saturday November 5, 2011 homecoming, the George N. Parks Minuteman Marching Band Building was dedicated. On November 12 the band performed at Lucas Oil Stadium for Bands of America Grand Nationals in Indianapolis, Indiana. On Saturday November 19, 2011 the band performed their field show for the last time for Senior Day.

The 2012 season featured games against the University of Connecticut, Indiana University, and other schools in the Mid-American Conference. Songs played by the band included a selection from Igor Stravinsky's The Firebird, Boogie Wonderland by Earth Wind and Fire, Jai Ho, and All Night Long by Lionel Richie. Band Day was held on November 17 with music from The Lion King and Senior Day was held on November 23.

=== 2013-2017 ===
On April 3, 2011, it was announced in front of an audience at the George N. Parks Minuteman Marching Band Building that the band would be performing at the 2013 Macy's Thanksgiving Day Parade, a first for the band. In the 2013 season, the band's show music consisted of music by Phil Collins, the classic jazz piece Malaguena, Age of Aquarius/Let the Sunshine In from the musical Hair, and Bandstand Boogie.

At Fenway Park in April 2014, the band was joined by Scottish bagpipers and drummers for a ceremony marking the first anniversary of the 2013 Boston Marathon bombing. In the 2014 season, the band's show music consisted of "In The Stone", "September (Earth, Wind & Fire song)", and "Let's Groove" by Earth, Wind, and Fire, "Bohemian Rhapsody", and "Spain (instrumental)". The band also put together a special show for the football game on Veteran's Day. The show, called "The Defense of Fort McHenry", featured many traditional American and British songs, such as "Yankee Doodle" and "Rule, Britannia!", and ended with an excerpt from "Stars and Stripes Forever". The band traveled to Penn State for the first time. They played at the Penn State Blue Band's version of Band Day, and at the UMass v. Penn State football game that immediately followed. Band Day was held on October 18 and had music from Up (2009 film), "The Incredibles", and "Toy Story". Senior Day was held on November 28.

During the band's field show on Senior Day in 2016, it was announced that the band was selected to perform in the 2018 Tournament of Roses Parade in Pasadena, California. On January 1, 2018 The UMass marching band performed in the Rose Parade on Jan. 1 in Pasadena, California. The parade gained nearly 50 million television viewers.

=== 2018-Present ===
After performing in the 2018 Tournament of the Roses Parade, the UMMB had successful fall 2018 and fall 2019 seasons featuring performances in 2018 New England Patriots games, the National Collegiate Marching Band Festival, MICCA, and hosting Band Days each year. In 2018, The Firebird was the featured woodwind piece and in 2019, Festive Overture (Shostakovich). 2018 was also the last season that "Roll Down the Field" would be played in pre-game. 2019 also featured a percussion feature of Gloria Estefan's "Get on Your Feet" / "Conga", and an arrangement of Sondheim's "Send In the Clowns".

The entire fall 2020 season including band camp was canceled due to the ongoing global COVID-19 pandemic. UMass moved classes online and the UMMB was not able to hold in person rehearsals or performances for the first time in over 100 years. In fall 2020, the UMMB held a virtual band day and virtual multibands performance. Starting Spring 2021, the UMMB was able to hold spring marching band outdoor rehearsals a few nights a week. These rehearsals complied with Social distancing guidelines regarding the ongoing pandemic by splitting the band up into sectionals every rehearsal.

In late May 2021, alumnus Ian Hale was announced the new Associate Director and head of percussion of the Minuteman Marching Band, replacing Thom Hannum after 40 years. Thom Hannum will still continue in a part-time role with the Minuteman Band.

The 2023 season marked the band's 150th anniversary. The first part of the field show was a medley of popular songs previously performed by the UMMB, entitled "A UMMB Fan's Dream", featuring "In the Stone", "September", and "Saturday Night's Alright". The classical piece was a selection of music from Leonard Bernstein's West Side Story, featuring "Maria", "Mambo", and "Tonight". The percussion feature was Stan Kenton's "Malagueña". During the band's field show at the October 7th UMass football game versus Toledo, it was announced that the UMMB would be marching in the 2024 Macy's Thanksgiving Day Parade.

The 2024 season's field show opened with a medley of Beyoncé songs, including "Texas Hold 'Em", "Crazy in Love", and "Halo". The classical piece was an arrangement of Antonin Dvořák's New World Symphony. Following this, the percussion feature was an arrangement of Dave Weckl's Island Magic. The field show was extended following the band's performance in the Max Roach Tribute Concert as a part of the Max Roach Centennial Celebration, adding a drumline cadence feature of "Big Sid" and a full band performance of "Ghost Dance". The 2024 season also featured the band's performance in the Macy's Thanksgiving Day Parade. The band's 75-second star performance was an arrangement of UMass alum Natalie Cole's This Will Be.

The 2025 season's field show opened with a medley of Rihanna songs, including "Diamonds", "We Found Love", and "Stay". The classical piece was entitled Requiem and featured selections from the compositions of the same name by Verdi and Mozart. The percussion feature was an arrangement of Dave Weckl's "Dis Place Dis". A portion of the show reintroduced to the band this year was a wind/guard feature of Adele's "Skyfall" as featured in the 2012 James Bond film of the same name.

== Songs ==
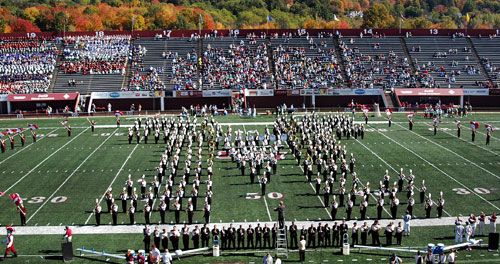
The University of Massachusetts Minuteman Marching Band during a pre-game show in 2006 for Band Day

The UMMB incorporates a pre-game show at all home football games in which several traditional songs are always played and the band marches into its traditional "M" formation. The Minuteman Band always features a Colonial Honor Guard made up of band members during the pre-game show, which presents the colors as the band plays "God Bless America. There is also a post-game "5th quarter" show at all football games in which the band's normal show is performed again. The band always closes its shows with Frank Sinatra's "My Way", introduced to the band by George Parks.

The Pre-game Show:

- "Fight Mass" – the UMass fight song. This song is played during the pre-game show as well as after every touchdown.
- "Twilight Shadows" – The Alma Mater
- "The Stars and Stripes Forever" - The presentation of the honor guard with the American flag.
- "The Star-Spangled Banner" – The band is often responsible for providing the National Anthem at all home football games.
- "UMass Spell-Out" – The band spells out UMASS on the field.
- "Land of 1000 Dances"

"Patriot", the theme from the 2000 film The Patriot, was last played in 2010. "Roll Down the Field" – The lyrics and title changed to "Cheer for UMass" in 2003 but the music stayed the same. Last played in 2018.
