= Band Day =

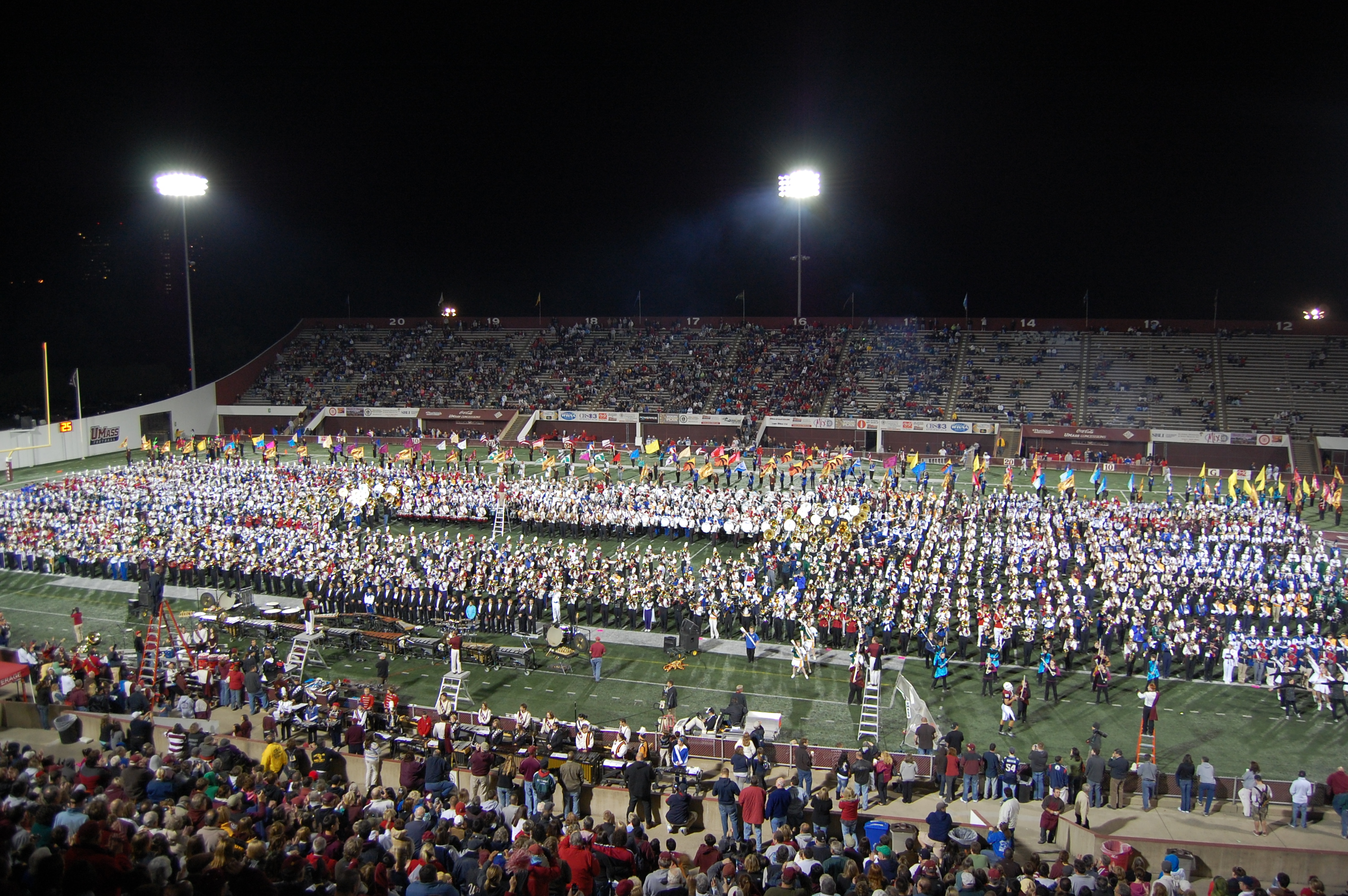
The University of Massachusetts Minuteman Marching Band at the 2009 Band Day at the University of Massachusetts Amherst

Band Day refers to an annual marching band festival or competition, usually intended for high school bands.

== Background ==
High school marching bands are invited onto a university campus to rehearse with and play alongside the university marching band for a halftime show or exhibition performance. Band day may also be a competition, where high schools compete against each other, while the university bands play exhibition performances. Occasionally, the band day competition is hosted at a state fair, such as the Indiana State Fair Band Day held at the Indiana State Fair every August.
