= University of Massachusetts Lowell Marching Band =

College marching band in Lowell, Massachusetts

- School: University of Massachusetts Lowell
- Location: Lowell, Massachusetts
- Founded: 1979
- Director: Debra-Nicole Huber
- Associate Director: Justin Mitnik
- Members: About 120

The University of Massachusetts Lowell Marching Band has about 120 members and is directed by Debra-Nicole Huber and assisted by Justin Mitnik. The band acts as an exhibition band for the University of Massachusetts Lowell, performing for the Massachusetts Instrumental and Choral Conductors Association (MICCA), New England Scholastic Band Association (NESBA) and other shows throughout Massachusetts, New Hampshire and Connecticut. The band also frequently performs at events on campus and in surrounding communities, including parades.

In recent years, it has performed hits from classic rock, latin, and jazz artists such as Queen, Led Zeppelin, The Beatles, Chase, Pat Metheny, Sting, The Who, Rush, Meet The Flintstones, and Chick Corea. The brass and woodwind music is arranged by Lutz and the percussion music is arranged by Jim Morris.

== History ==
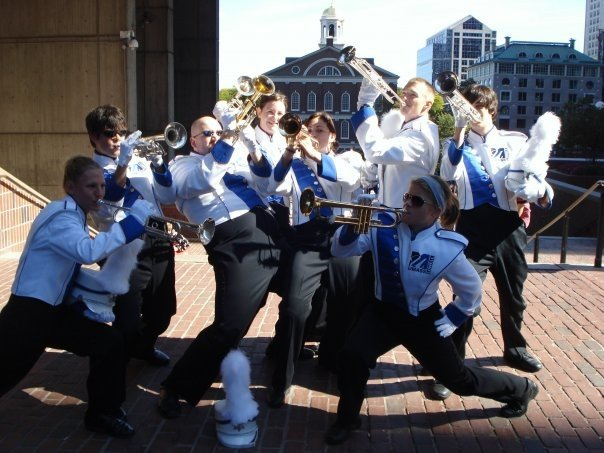
The trumpet section in 2009

The UMass Lowell Marching Band draws its members from virtually every department in each of the university's schools and colleges. The band has been a major ensemble of the Department of Music since 1979.

In its role as ambassador for the university, the marching band performs throughout New England at parades, clinics, exhibitions, and serves as an ambassador for the university and serves as a source of entertainment at university activities. Past performances included exhibitions for United States President Bill Clinton, also for Governors of Massachusetts, and other state dignitaries as well as at band festivals and televised performances seen by audiences of thousands.

Since UMass Lowell eliminated their football team in 2003, the band mostly performs in exhibitions at high school marching band competitions and festivals across the New England region. These include the Massachusetts Instrumental and Choral Conductors Association and the New England Scholastic Band Association (NESBA). The marching band is a mixture of both drum corps style visuals and jazz-rock style music. The band's musical program was specially arranged for the ensemble by Lutz, drawn from the classics, jazz, rock and popular idioms. Music and motion were combined through original visual design. The bands consists of instrumentalists, including trumpets, mellophones, baritones, trombones, sousaphones, alto saxophones, tenor saxophones, marching percussion, guitar and bass. It does not have a clarinet or flute section, but does have a piccolo section. The band suspended their color guard in 2003.

In the Fall of 2020, due to the COVID-19 pandemic, the band's rehearsals were held virtually through Zoom, concluding with a video performance for a limited audience of UMass Lowell music students. For this virtual season, the band's numbers were a fraction of the size from years prior (70).

In October 2025, while on their way to an exhibition performance in Norwood, a bus carrying around 40 students, mostly members of the percussion section, caught fire off Massachusetts Route 109 in Westwood. While all of the instruments, which were stored in heat insulated compartments, were saved, over $40,000 in uniform and personal equipment were destroyed.

After 47 years, director Dan Lutz announced his retirement during the 2025-2026 school year. He had been with the ensemble since it first began in 1979. He originally was hired as the band’s music arranger, and was later promoted to trumpet technician and assistant director by the mid 1980s. He became the Marching Band’s director in 1988. In 1995, he was officially appointed as the Director of Bands at UMass Lowell, overseeing the university’s marching band, concert band, wind ensemble, Jazz-Rock Big Band, and the Mary Jo Leahey Symphonic Band Camp. He has grown the marching band from 38 members in the 1980s to over 120 members by the 2010s.

On July 1st, 2026, Deb Huber, who has served as the Assistant Director of Bands of UMass Lowell since 1999, was officially appointed the Director of Bands of UMass Lowell after Dan Lutz retired. Lutz will continue to arrange the show music for the marching band for a few years during his retirement until further notice.

== Instrumentation ==
The instrumentation consists of piccolos, alto saxophones, tenor saxophones, trumpets, mellophone, trombones, baritones, sousaphone, and a variety of marching and stationary percussion instruments.

== Staff ==
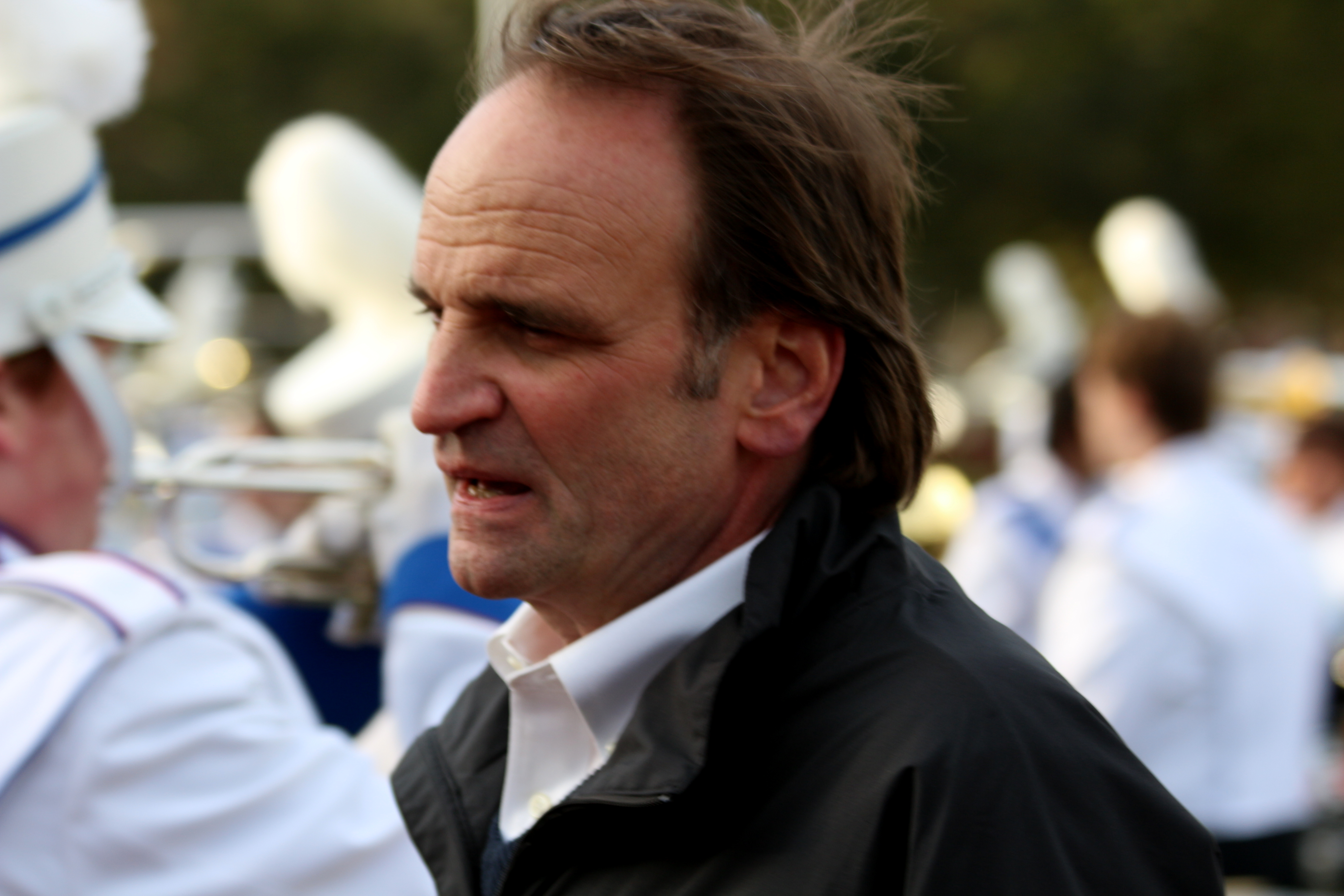
Dan Lutz, former director of the marching band (1988-2025)

- Debra-Nicole Huber – director
- Justin Mitnik – associate director
- Kristen McGuire (Sardynski) – percussion caption head
- Adam Thomas - visual caption head
- Daniel Lutz – wind arranger
- Jim Morris – percussion arranger
- Gilles Ouellette – visual designer
- Eric Linsner – music instructor
- Chris Fendt – visual instructor
- Kevin Webb – visual instructor
- Shah Salmi – visual instructor
- Eric Poster – visual instructor
- Benjamin Lambert – visual instructor
- Eli Silverstein – percussion instructor
- Mathieu Bruneau – percussion instructor
- Mike Newman – pit instructor

== Student Leaders ==
- 2026 - Tori McCoy - field conductor, Darius Daniels - assistant field conductor, Marc Williams - drum captain, Jack Giglio - drum captain
- 2025 - Alejandro Bonilla - field conductor, Tori McCoy - assistant field conductor, Paul Bremilst-Ellis - drum captain, Marc Williams - drum captain
- 2024 - Anthony Amatucci - field conductor, Alejandro Bonilla - assistant field conductor, Paul Bremilst-Ellis - drum captain, Marc Williams - drum captain
- 2023 - Anthony Amatucci - field conductor, Alejandro Bonilla - assistant field conductor, Paul Bremilst-Ellis - drum captain, Marc Williams - drum captain
- 2022 - Sarah McGregor - field conductor, Sarah Lindtveit - assistant field conductor
- 2021 - Kyle Watson - field conductor, Sarah McGregor- assistant field conductor, Matt Schwamb - drum captain
- 2020 - Kyle Watson - field conductor, Jackson Winders - assistant field conductor
- 2019 - Josh Walsh - field conductor, Kyle Watson - assistant field conductor, Eli Silverstein - drum captain
- 2018 - Josh Walsh - field conductor, Trevor Poulin - assistant field conductor, Mathieu Bruneau - drum captain
- 2017 - Michael Powderly - field conductor, Josh Carter - assistant field conductor, Matthew Vayanos - drum captain
- 2016 - Michael Powderly - field conductor, Josh Carter - assistant field conductor, Matthew Vayanos - drum captain
- 2015 - Kevin Goddu - field conductor, Michael Powderly - assistant field conductor, Ryan Enos - drum captain
- 2014 - Kenneth Poore - field conductor, Miguel Landestoy - assistant field conductor, Kevin Goddu - assistant field conductor, Ryan Enos - drum captain
- 2013 – Kenneth Poore – field conductor, Miguel Landestoy – assistant field conductor, Matthew Bruce - drum captain
- 2012 – James Ham – field conductor, Kenneth Poore – assistant field conductor, Kevin Griffin - drum captain
- 2011 – Kevin Webb – field conductor, James Ham – assistant field conductor, Kevin Griffin - drum captain
- 2010 – Andy Chau – field conductor, James Ham – assistant field conductor, David Grant - drum captain
- 2009 – Andy Chau – field conductor, Kevin Webb – assistant field conductor
- 2008 – Anthony Beatrice – field conductor, Andy Chau – assistant field conductor
- 2007 – Anthony Beatrice – field conductor, Joshua Conover – assistant field conductor
- 2006 – Matt Perez – field conductor, Anthony Beatrice – assistant field conductor
- 2005 – Matt Perez – field conductor, Steve Lee – assistant field conductor
- 2004 – Theresa Sabina – field conductor, Matt Perez – assistant field conductor
- 2003 – Mike Reidy – field conductor, Theresa Sabina – assistant field conductor
- 2002 – Mike Reidy – field conductor, Ellen Campbell – assistant field conductor, Alexis Guay – color guard captain
- 2001 – Greg Davis – field conductor, Mike Reidy – assistant field conductor, Holly Sullivan – color guard captain
- 2000 – Aaron Goldberg – field conductor, Greg Davis – assistant field conductor
- 1999 – Aaron Goldberg – field conductor
- 1998 – Brendan LaFlamme – field conductor, Jamie Knapp – color guard captain
- 1995 - Kris DeMoura - field conductor, Daniel Sharmer - assistant field conductor
- 1994 - Jim Felker - field conductor, Heather Erickson-assistant field conductor
- 1993 - Jim Felker - field conductor, Karen Consalvi-assistant field conductor
- 1992 - Jim Felker - field conductor, Karen Consalvi-assistant field conductor
- 1984 - John Luciano - field conductor, Doreen Rivard - field conductor
- 1983 - Elaine Foley - field conductor, John Luciano - field conductor
- 1982 - Elaine Foley - field conductor, John Luciano - field conductor

== Shows ==
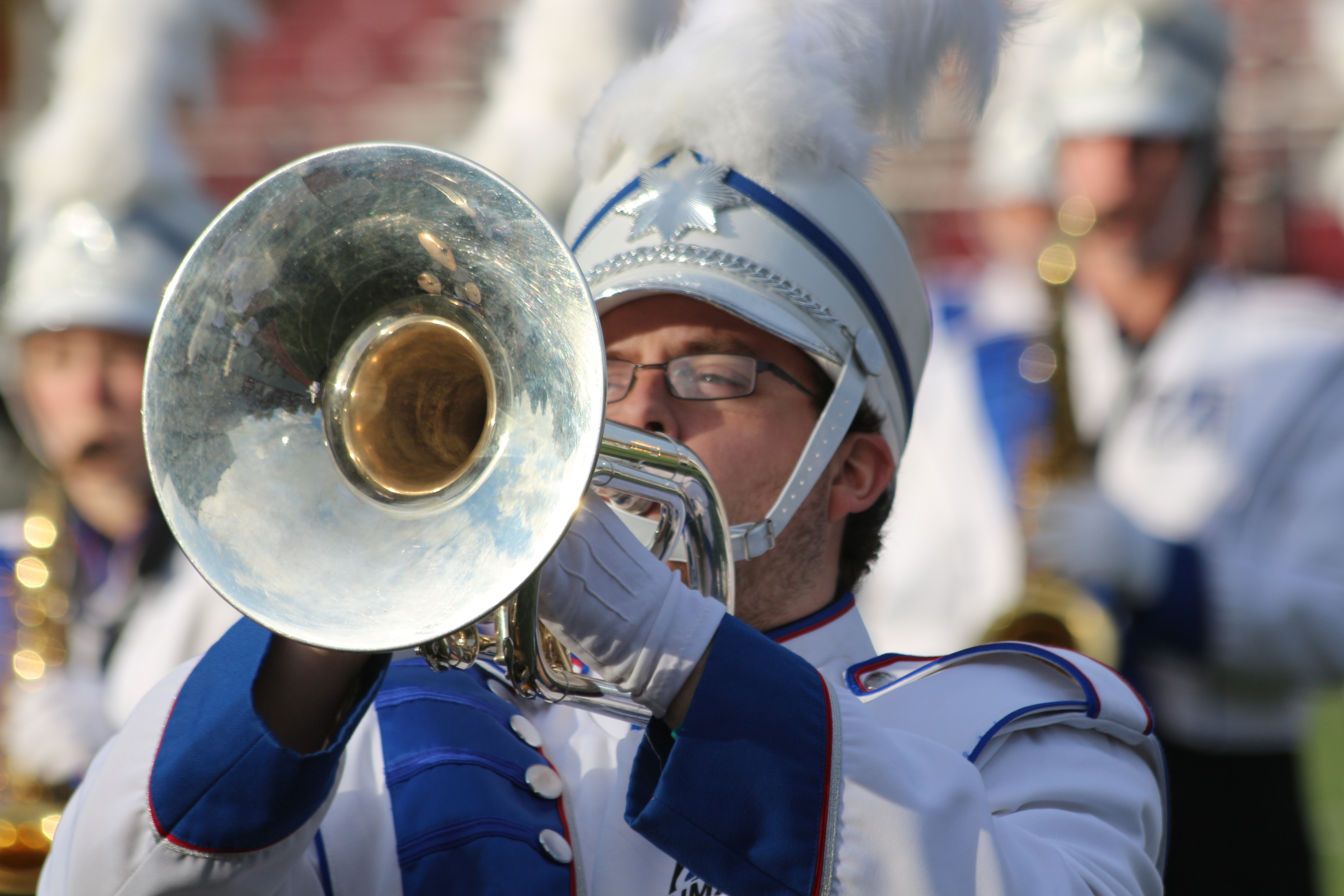
A mellophone player in 2013

- 2026 - New Beginnings - Day One (John Tesh), Santorini (Yanni), Jerusalem (Hubert Parry), Reflections of Earth (Gavin Greenaway), Reflections of Earth Finale (Gavin Greenaway)
- 2025 - These Are A Few Of Our Favorite Things - Part One: First Circle (Pat Metheny), Third Wind (Pat Metheny), Part Two: Bohemian Rhapsody (Queen), Part Three: I Was Brought To My Senses (Sting), Seven Days (Sting), Part Four: Birdland (Weather Report), Part Five: Celebration Suite (Chick Corea), Malagueña (Ernesto Lecuona)
- 2024 - Music of Rush – The Camera Eye, Red Barchetta, Limelight, Subdivisions, Freewill, YYZ, Tom Sawyer
- 2023 - Music of The Who – Tommy, Won't Get Fooled Again, Love Reign O'er Me, Who Are You, Baba O'Riley
- 2022 - Music of Led Zeppelin - Kashmir, Black Dog, Four Sticks, Dazed and Confused, Fool in the Rain, Stairway to Heaven
- 2021 - The Music of Chick Corea - My Spanish Heart, La Fiesta/Celebration Suite, Spain, Night Streets, Central Park, The Musician, Spanish Fantasy (Part 4)
- 2020 - Liberty Fanfare/The Mission - John Williams, Malagueña (Ernesto Lecuona)
- 2019 - The Music of The Beatles - "Eleanor Rigby", Little Help From My Friends, Norwegian Wood, Magical Mystery Tour, Penny Lane, "Got to Get You into My Life", Revolution, The Long and Winding Road, Something, Hey Jude, The End
- 2018 - 40th Anniversary - Part One: Now or Never (New York Voices), Santorini (Yanni), First Circle (Pat Metheny), Part Two: Third Wind (Pat Metheny), Meet the Flintstones (Hoyt Curtin), Bohemian Rhapsody (Queen), Minuano (Pat Metheny), Part Three: Baroque Samba (New York Voices), Central Park (Chick Corea), Birdland (Weather Report), Part Four: La Fiesta/Celebration Suite (Chick Corea), Malagueña (Ernesto Lecuona)
- 2017 - Music of Chase - Open Up Wide, Bochawa, Weird Song, Invitation To A River, Get It On
- 2016 - Time for a Change - First Circle- Pat Metheny, Reflections of Earth- Gavin Greenaway, Blue Rondo ala Turk /Take Five- Dave Brubeck, Whiplash- Don Ellis
- 2015 - Music of Led Zeppelin - Kashmir, Bolero, Black Dog, Four Sticks, Dazed and Confused, Fool in the Rain, Stairway To Heaven, Whole Lotta Love
- 2014 – Music of Queen – Bicycle Race, Somebody to Love, Killer Queen, Bohemian Rhapsody
- 2013 – The Music of Santana – All I Ever Wanted, Dance Sister Dance, Smooth, She's Not There/Black Magic Woman, Everybody's Everything
- 2012 – The Music of Emerson, Lake & Palmer and Yes - Fanfare for the Common Man, Karn Evil 9, Piano Concerto #2, From the Beginning, Changes, I've Seen All People, Roundabout
- 2011 – Music of The Who – Selections from Tommy, Won't Get Fooled Again, Reign O'er Me, Who Are You
- 2010 – Music of Rush – The Camera Eye, Limelight, Roll the Bones, Subdivisions, Tom Sawyer
- 2009 – A Spanish Fantasy – Music of Chick Corea – Concierto de Aranjuez/Celebration Suite, Central Park, My Spanish Heart, Spanish Fantasy Part IV/La Fiesta/Celebration Suite
- 2008 – Latin Laced Rhythm and Blues – Faces/Free, In the Stone, God Bless the Child, Malagueña
- 2007 – Music of Queen – Bicycle Race, Somebody to Love, Killer Queen, Bohemian Rhapsody
- 2006 – Music of Sting
- 2005 – Music of Pat Metheny – Imaginary Day, Heat of the Day, Beat 70, Minuano
- 2004 – Music of Phil Collins- Los Endos Suite, The West Side, Chips & Salsa
- 2003 – Channel One Suite – Bill Reddie, Third Wind – Pat Metheny
- 2002 – Tapestry of Nations – Gavin Greenaway, Reflections of Earth – Gavin Greenaway, Minuano – Pat Metheny, First Circle – Pat Metheny
- 2001 – Day One, Santorini, Baroque Samba, Episode, Back Home
- 2000 – Los Endos Suite – Phil Collins, Night Streets – Chick Corea, Concierto de Aranjuez – Chick Corea, La Fiesta/Celebration Suite – Chick Corea
- 1999 – Threshold – Patrick Williams, Spring – Matrix, The Musician – Chick Corea, Malagueña – Ernesto Lecuona
- 1998 – Malagueña – Ernesto Lecuona, Central Park – Chick Corea, My Spanish Heart – Chick Corea, Third Wind – Pat Metheny
- 1988 - Aquarius, Cuernos, Meet the Flintstones
- 1987 - For Once In My Life, Romancing the Stone, Meet the Flintstones, Alonzo
- 1986 - Living in the Past - Ian Anderson, The Long and Winding Road - Lennon–McCartney, Meet the Flintstones - Hoyt Curtin
- 1985 - First Circle - Pat Metheny, Mata Hari - Al Di Meola, Olé - Slide Hampton, Starlight Express - Andrew Lloyd Webber, Get it On - Bill Chase & Terry Richards
- 1984 - The Musician - Chick Corea; West Side; The Devil is a Liar - Seawind; Percussion Feature: Spanish Fantasy; The Long and Winding Road - Lennon-McCartney
- 1983 - Eleanor Rigby - Lennon-McCartney; On the Boulevard - Manhattan Transfer; Hard to Say I'm Sorry/Get Away - Chicago; Percussion Feature: Reground to Six
- 1982 - Music from Carmina Burana - Carl Orff; Corazòn - Carole King; Cuernos - Dan Lutz
- 1981 - Go Back Home; Smiling Phases - Blood, Sweat and Tears; The One That You Love - Air Supply; Whiplash
- 1980 - Howard Hanson: 2nd Symphony; In the Stone - Earth, Wind and Fire; I'm Running
- 1979 - Malagueña; Music from "SWAT"; Theme from "The Fox"; Ride, Captain Ride; Pavane; Marianne
