= Collegiate Marching Band Festival =

American annual marching band event held in Allentown, Pennsylvania

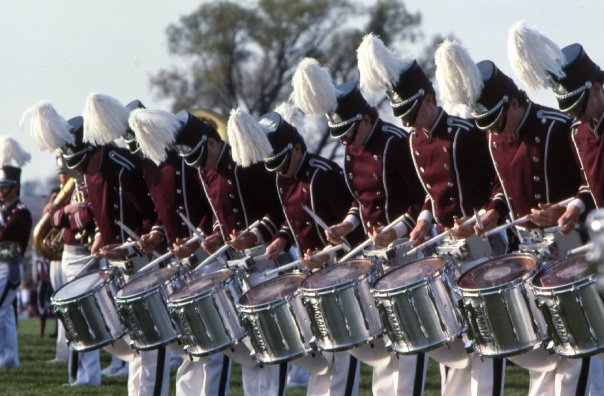
Indiana University of Pennsylvania's marching band at CMBF in November 1999

West Chester University's marching band at CMBF in 2004

The Collegiate Marching Band Festival, also called the CMBF, is an annual event held in Allentown, Pennsylvania. The festival showcases college and university marching bands of all sizes and styles from across the Northeastern United States.

First held in 1996, the event typically takes places in early October at J. Birney Crum Stadium, a renowned venue for marching band and drum corps performances and the largest high school football stadium in the Mid-Atlantic United States.

The festival is not a competition, but an opportunity for fans and band members alike to view bands that perform a variety of shows and exhibit different performance styles.

== Management and sponsors ==
The festival is currently managed by Vivace Productions, Inc. in West Chester, Pennsylvania.

== Different Styles ==
While many of the participating bands perform contemporary “corps style” shows using roll-step marching, other performance varieties abound. Morgan State University, from Baltimore, Maryland, performs a high-energy show typical of southern HBCU bands. Lehigh University and Penn State University, both of which have participated in the past, perform traditional "Big Ten" style shows with a high-step marching technique (the coincidence that Penn State is in the Big Ten). Other bands, including Indiana University of Pennsylvania, Kutztown University of Pennsylvania, West Chester University, The University of Delaware, the University of Massachusetts Amherst, and Boston University’s Terrier Marching Band have developed unique styles all their own: the corps-style type with the roll-step and other drill techniques.

== Traditions ==
Celebrating its 21st occurrence in 2016, the festival has a number of traditions, which spectators and performers have come to anticipate on an annual basis.

Order of performance

- The order of performance is rotated on an annual basis although it still follows a pattern where smaller-sized bands perform early in the day and larger bands perform later. As a custom, the first band to perform also plays the National Anthem to signify the start of the festival.

Vendors

- The festival features an area for vendors to set up information booths. Vendors have included companies involved in the marching arts, drum and bugle corps from both Drum Corps International and Drum Corps Associates, and recruiting tables for participating schools.

Concessions

- J. Birney Crum Stadium boasts some eccentric food choices. Among them can be found fried pierogies and giant Hawaiian Shave Ices that resemble softball-sized snow cones. Many festival-goers make these treats a regular part of the annual event.

Musical Organizations

- The Collegiate Marching Band Festival is traditionally staffed by the Eta Rho chapter of Kappa Kappa Psi and the Zeta Upsilon chapter of Tau Beta Sigma. Members of these organizations from several chapters use the festival as a time to gather together and socialize while engaging in their own particular traditions.

Additional musical fraternities such as Phi Mu Alpha also congregate at this time. Alumni and members of area drum corps gather and socialize at the event; most notably the Reading Buccaneers gather annually at the end of the event on or near the field. Students, staff, and alumni from the participating bands take this opportunity to commingle with other members and before all the schools depart. Many of the organizations sing their respective hymn/song before departing the festival.

Tubas/Sousaphones

- After the last band performs, the tuba and sousaphone players from several of the larger bands congregate at the center of the field to play traditional tunes, socialize with each other, and generally put on a humorous display for the exiting crowds. This congregation is called "The Clusterfun".

== Performing Ensembles (2003-2014) ==
=== 8th Annual CMBF ===
Sunday, September 21, 2003 - Order of Appearance

- Kutztown University of Pennsylvania Marching Unit
- Lehigh University – Marching 97
- Lebanon Valley College – The Pride of the Valley
- Gettysburg College – Bullet Marching Band
- Boston University – Terrier Marching Band
- California University of Pennsylvania Marching Band
- Millersville University – Marauder Marching Band
- Shippensburg University – Red Raider Marching Band
- Shepherd University – Ram Band
- Morgan State University – The Magnificent Marching Machine
- Indiana University of Pennsylvania – The Legend
- Liberty University – The Spirit of the Mountain
- University of Massachusetts Amherst – Minuteman Marching Band The Power and Class of New England
- Mansfield University – The Pride of Pennsylvania
- University of Delaware – Fightin’ Blue Hen Marching Band
- West Chester University – Incomparable Golden Rams Marching Band

=== 9th Annual CMBF ===
Sunday, October 10, 2004 - Order of Appearance

- Clarion University – Golden Eagle Marching Band
- Lebanon Valley College – The Pride of the Valley
- Kutztown University of Pennsylvania Marching Unit
- Boston University – Terrier Marching Band
- Gettysburg College – Bullet Marching Band
- California University of Pennsylvania Marching Band
- Millersville University – Marauder Marching Band
- Towson University – Tiger Marching Band
- Temple University – Diamond Marching Band
- Shepherd University – Ram Band
- Mansfield University – The Pride of Pennsylvania
- Slippery Rock University – The Marching Pride
- Morgan State University – The Magnificent Marching Machine
- Shippensburg University – Red Raider Marching Band
- West Chester University – Incomparable Golden Rams Marching Band
- University of Delaware – Fightin’ Blue Hen Marching Band
- Indiana University of Pennsylvania – The Legend
- University of Massachusetts Amherst – Minuteman Marching Band The Power and Class of New England

=== 10th Annual CMBF ===
Sunday, October 2, 2005 - Order of Appearance

- East Stroudsburg University of Pennsylvania – Warrior Marching Band
- Clarion University – Golden Eagle Marching Band
- Kutztown University of Pennsylvania Marching Unit
- Lebanon Valley College – The Pride of the Valley
- Shepherd University – Ram Band
- Slippery Rock University – The Marching Pride
- Liberty University – The Spirit of the Mountain
- Boston University – Terrier Marching Band
- California University of Pennsylvania Marching Band
- Towson University – Tiger Marching Band
- Morgan State University – The Magnificent Marching Machine
- Millersville University – Marauder Marching Band
- Shippensburg University – Red Raider Marching Band
- Mansfield University – The Pride of Pennsylvania
- University of Massachusetts Amherst – Minuteman Marching Band The Power and Class of New England
- University of Delaware – Fightin’ Blue Hen Marching Band
- West Chester University – Incomparable Golden Rams Marching Band
- Indiana University of Pennsylvania – The Legend

=== 11th Annual CMBF ===
Sunday, October 8, 2006 - Order of Appearance

- Clarion University – Golden Eagle Marching Band
- East Stroudsburg University – Warrior Marching Band
- Shepherd University – Ram Band
- Slippery Rock University – The Marching Pride
- Lebanon Valley College – The Pride of the Valley
- Kutztown University of Pennsylvania Marching Unit
- California University of Pennsylvania Marching Band
- Millersville University – Marauder Marching Band
- Morgan State University – The Magnificent Marching Machine
- Temple University – Diamond Marching Band
- Towson University – Tiger Marching Band
- Indiana University of Pennsylvania – The Legend
- University of Delaware – Fightin’ Blue Hen Marching Band
- Shippensburg University – Red Raider Marching Band
- Mansfield University – The Spirit and the Pride
- University of Massachusetts Amherst – Minuteman Marching Band The Power and Class of New England
- West Chester University – Incomparable Golden Rams Marching Band

=== 12th Annual CMBF ===
Sunday, September 30, 2007 - Order of Appearance

- Moravian College – Greyhound Marching Band & Color Guard
- East Stroudsburg University – Warrior Marching Band
- Boston University – Terrier Marching Band
- Millersville University – Marauder Marching Band
- Clarion University – Golden Eagle Marching Band
- Slippery Rock University – The Marching Pride
- California University of Pennsylvania Marching Band
- Kutztown University of Pennsylvania Marching Unit
- Shepherd University – Ram Band
- Shippensburg University – Red Raider Marching Band
- Towson University – Tiger Marching Band
- Lebanon Valley College – The Pride of the Valley
- Morgan State University – The Magnificent Marching Machine
- Gettysburg College – Bullets Marching Band
- Indiana University of Pennsylvania – The Legend
- West Chester University – Incomparable Golden Rams Marching Band
- Liberty University – The Spirit of the Mountain
- University of Massachusetts Amherst – Minuteman Marching Band The Power and Class of New England
- Mansfield University – The Spirit and the Pride
- University of Delaware – Fightin’ Blue Hen Marching Band

=== 13th Annual CMBF ===
Sunday, September 28, 2008 - Order Of Appearance

- Bloomsburg University – Maroon & Gold Marching Band
- Moravian College – Greyhound Marching Band & Color Guard
- Millersville University – Marauder Marching Band
- East Stroudsburg University – Warrior Marching Band
- Cheyney University – Wolves Marching Band
- Clarion University – Golden Eagle Marching Band
- Gettysburg College – Bullets Marching Band
- Boston University – Terrier Marching Band
- Kutztown University of Pennsylvania Marching Unit
- Lebanon Valley College – The Pride of the Valley
- California University of Pennsylvania Marching Band
- Slippery Rock University – The Marching Pride
- Shepherd University – Ram Band
- Towson University – Tiger Marching Band
- Temple University – Diamond Marching Band
- Shippensburg University – Red Raider Marching Band
- Morgan State University – The Magnificent Marching Machine
- Mansfield University – The Spirit and the Pride
- University of Delaware – Fightin’ Blue Hen Marching Band
- Indiana University of Pennsylvania – The Legend
- West Chester University – Incomparable Golden Rams Marching Band
- University of Massachusetts Amherst – Minuteman Marching Band The Power and Class of New England

=== 14th Annual CMBF ===
Sunday, October 4, 2009 - Order Of Appearance

- Moravian College – Greyhound Marching Band & Color Guard
- Bloomsburg University – Maroon & Gold Marching Band
- Millersville University – Marauder Marching Band
- East Stroudsburg University – Warrior Marching Band
- Clarion University – Golden Eagle Marching Band
- Cheyney University – Wolves Marching Band
- Gettysburg College – Bullets Marching Band
- Lebanon Valley College – The Pride of the Valley
- Kutztown University of Pennsylvania Marching Unit
- California University of Pennsylvania Marching Band
- Slippery Rock University – The Marching Pride
- University of New Hampshire – Wildcat Marching Band
- Shippensburg University – Red Raider Marching Band
- Towson University – Tiger Marching Band
- Shepherd University – Ram Band
- Morgan State University – The Magnificent Marching Machine
- University of Massachusetts Amherst – Minuteman Marching Band The Power and Class of New England
- Mansfield University – The Spirit and the Pride
- University of Delaware – Fightin’ Blue Hen Marching Band
- Indiana University of Pennsylvania – The Legend
- West Chester University – Incomparable Golden Rams Marching Band

=== 15th Annual CMBF ===
Sunday, October 3, 2010 - Order Of Appearance

- Lehigh University – Marching 97
- East Stroudsburg University – Warrior Marching Band
- Millersville University – Marauder Marching Band
- Cheyney University – Wolves Marching Band
- Moravian College – Greyhound Marching Band & Color Guard
- Clarion University – Golden Eagle Marching Band
- Bloomsburg University – Maroon & Gold Marching Band
- Lebanon Valley College – The Pride of the Valley
- Kutztown University of Pennsylvania Marching Unit
- California University of Pennsylvania Marching Band
- Morgan State University – The Magnificent Marching Machine
- Towson University – Tiger Marching Band
- Shepherd University – Ram Band
- Shippensburg University – Red Raider Marching Band
- Slippery Rock University – The Marching Pride
- Mansfield University – The Spirit and the Pride
- Indiana University of Pennsylvania – The Legend
- West Chester University – Incomparable Golden Rams Marching Band
- University of Delaware – Fightin’ Blue Hen Marching Band
- University of Massachusetts Amherst – Minuteman Marching Band The Power and Class of New England

=== 16th Annual CMBF ===
Sunday, September 25, 2011 - Order of Appearance

- College of the Holy Cross - "Goodtime" Marching Band
- Clark University
- Gettysburg College – Bullets Marching Band
- East Stroudsburg University – Warrior Marching Band
- Clarion University – Golden Eagle Marching Band
- Moravian College – Greyhound Marching Band & Color Guard
- Cheyney University – Wolves Marching Band
- Kutztown University of Pennsylvania Marching Unit
- Lebanon Valley College – The Pride of the Valley
- Bloomsburg University – Maroon & Gold Marching Band
- Millersville University – Marauder Marching Band
- California University of Pennsylvania Marching Band
- Morgan State University – The Magnificent Marching Machine
- Rutgers University – Marching Scarlet Knights
- Shepherd University – Ram Band
- Towson University – Tiger Marching Band
- Shippensburg University – Red Raider Marching Band
- Slippery Rock University – The Marching Pride
- University of Massachusetts Amherst – Minuteman Marching Band The Power and Class of New England
- Mansfield University – The Spirit and the Pride
- Indiana University of Pennsylvania – The Legend
- West Chester University – Incomparable Golden Rams Marching Band
- University of Delaware – Fightin’ Blue Hen Marching Band

=== 17th Annual CMBF ===
Sunday, September 30, 2012 - Order of Appearance

- Boston University - BU Marching Band
- East Stroudsburg University – Warrior Marching Band
- Clarion University – Golden Eagle Marching Band
- Moravian College – Greyhound Marching Band & Color Guard
- Cheyney University – Wolves Marching Band
- Millersville University – Marauder Marching Band
- Kutztown University of Pennsylvania Marching Unit
- Gettysburg College – Bullets Marching Band
- Bloomsburg University – Maroon & Gold Marching Band
- California University of PA Marching Band
- Morgan State University – The Magnificent Marching Machin
- Lebanon Valley College – The Pride of the Valley
- Indiana University of Pennsylvania – The Legend
- Shepherd University – Ram Band
- Shippensburg University – Red Raider Marching Band
- Towson University – Tiger Marching Band
- Rutgers University – Marching Scarlet Knights
- Slippery Rock University – The Marching Pride
- University of Delaware – Fightin’ Blue Hen Marching Band
- University of Massachusetts Amherst – Minuteman Marching Band The Power and Class of New England
- Mansfield University – The Spirit and the Pride
- West Chester University – Incomparable Golden Rams Marching Band

=== 18th Annual CMBF ===
Sunday, September 29, 2013 - Order of Appearance

- Lock Haven University - Bald Eagle Marching Band
- Clarion University – Golden Eagle Marching Band
- Cheyney University – "Soulful Sound" Marching Band
- Moravian College – Greyhound Marching Band & Color Guard
- Boston University - BU Marching Band
- East Stroudsburg University – Warrior Marching Band
- Kutztown University of Pennsylvania Marching Unit
- Shepherd University – Ram Band
- Millersville University – Marauder Marching Band
- University of New Hampshire - Wildcat Marching Band
- Morgan State University – The Magnificent Marching Machine
- Gettysburg College – Bullets Marching Band
- Lebanon Valley College – The Pride of the Valley
- Bloomsburg University – Husky Marching Band
- California University of PA Marching Band
- Indiana University of Pennsylvania – The Legend
- Shippensburg University – Red Raider Marching Band
- Slippery Rock University – The Marching Pride
- Rutgers University – Marching Scarlet Knights
- Towson University – Tiger Marching Band
- Mansfield University – The Spirit and the Pride
- West Chester University – Incomparable Golden Rams Marching Band
- University of Delaware – Fightin’ Blue Hen Marching Band
- University of Massachusetts Amherst – Minuteman Marching Band The Power and Class of New England

=== 19th Annual CMBF ===
Sunday, September 28, 2014 - Order of Appearance

- Lock Haven University - Bald Eagle Marching Band
- Boston University - BU Marching Band
- Clarion University – Golden Eagle Marching Band
- Moravian College – Greyhound Marching Band & Color Guard
- Millersville University – Marauder Marching Band
- Cheyney University – "Soulful Sound" Marching Band
- Kutztown University of Pennsylvania - Marching Unit
- Shepherd University – Ram Band
- Bloomsburg University – Husky Marching Band
- Morgan State University – The Magnificent Marching Machine
- Gettysburg College – Bullets Marching Band
- Lebanon Valley College – The Pride of the Valley
- California University of PA Marching Band
- Towson University – Tiger Marching Band
- Indiana University of Pennsylvania – The Legend
- Shippensburg University – Red Raider Marching Band
- Slippery Rock University – The Marching Pride
- University of Massachusetts Amherst – Minuteman Marching Band The Power and Class of New England
- Mansfield University – The Spirit and the Pride
- West Chester University – Incomparable Golden Rams Marching Band
- University of Delaware – Fightin’ Blue Hen Marching Band
