= West Chester University Golden Rams Marching Band =

College marching band in West Chester, Pennsylvania

Golden Rams Marching Band
- Nickname: Incomparable Golden Rams Marching Band
- School: West Chester University
- Location: West Chester, PA
- Conference: PSAC
- Director: Adam Gumble
- Associate Director: M. Gregory Martin
- Members: 300+
- Fight song: "The RAM Fight Song"
- Website: Incomparable Golden Rams Marching Band

The West Chester University "Incomparable" Golden Rams Marching Band (IGRMB) is the marching band for West Chester University, a public university in West Chester, Pennsylvania and is part of the university's Wells School Of Music.

The largest student organization at West Chester University, the band is composed of over 300 students from more than 60 majors and involves students from every segment of the campus population. They perform pre-game, halftime, or post-game at all home West Chester University football games. The band also performs in parades and high school marching band competitions in Pennsylvania, New Jersey, and Delaware, and at the annual Collegiate Marching Band Festival in Allentown, Pennsylvania.

== History ==
The first documented reference to a marching band at West Chester University of Pennsylvania can be traced back to the institution's beginnings as a State Normal School. The Normal Band was organized on November 22, 1889, principally to furnish march music for a military company composed of students. This group would be the predecessor of the West Chester University Marching Band of contemporary times.

== Honors ==
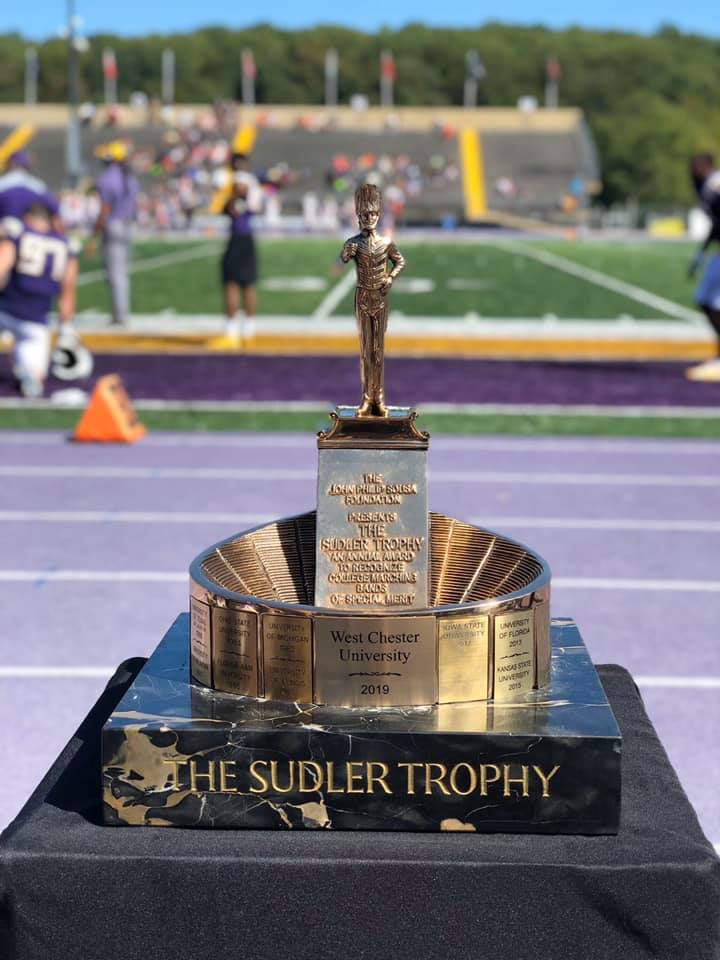
The 2019 Sudler Trophy, awarded to the Golden Rams Marching Band

In 1993, the band performed pregame for Game 3 of the World Series in Philadelphia.

In 2001, the band performed in Boscov's 6 ABC Philadelphia Thanksgiving Day parade.

In 2009 and 2018, the band attended the Bands of America Grand National Championships in Indianapolis, an honor given to only two college bands in the United States each year.

In 2015, the band was selected to perform in the Macy's Thanksgiving Day Parade, one of the few college bands to receive the honor.

In 2019, The IGRMB was awarded the Sudler Trophy by the John Philip Sousa Foundation. This is the first time in history that an NCAA Division II university received this honor.

In 2021, The IGRMB was selected to perform at the home opener for the Philadelphia Eagles.

The IGRMB performed in the 2024 edition of the Rose Parade, the first time the band has been honored to perform.
