= Steven Yavarow =

Former President of MICCA in Massachusetts

Steven T. Yavarow
- Citizenship: American
- Occupations: Music educator; conductor
- Known for: Former President of the Massachusetts Instrumental and Choral Conductors Association ("MICCA")

Steven T. Yavarow is the former President of the Massachusetts Instrumental and Choral Conductors Association ("MICCA") and a former Music Director of Hopkinton Music Association, Hopkinton, Massachusetts' award-winning music program.

Yavarow has led Hopkinton High School's Concert Band to medal-winning performances at festivals across Massachusetts and internationally. Despite having an arguably "controversial" approach to music education, his work has consistently been praised by both students and critics.

Yavarow is also known for his philanthropic work, awarding over fifty scholarships to gifted music students across Massachusetts.

Mr. Yavarrow retired in 2014, but continues to teach budding students (Brandon Fu) in his community. He continues to be involved with youth ensembles across the state.
