= When Twilight Shadows Deepen =

- Hymn by Frederick D. Griggs
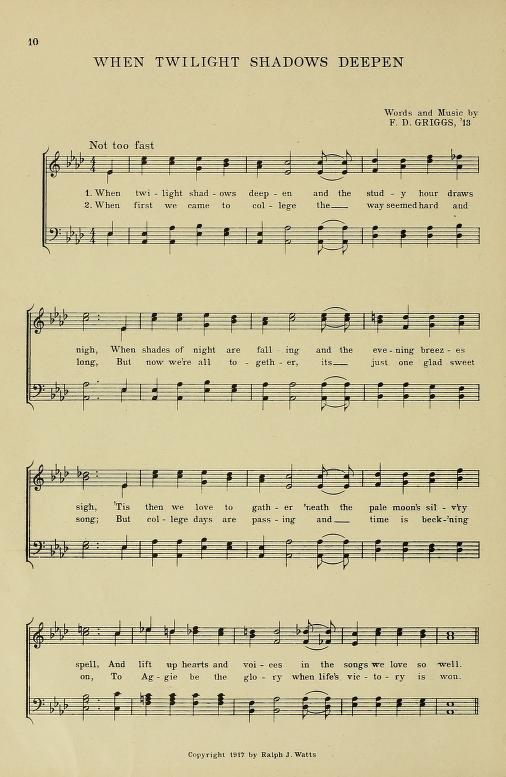
- Year: 1912–1913 academic year

Premiere
- Date: Spring 1913
- Location: Massachusetts Agricultural College
- Conductor: Fred D. Griggs
- Performers: MAC class of 1913

"When Twilight Shadows Deepen", unofficially known as "Twilight Shadows" is the University of Massachusetts Amherst's alma mater. It was composed by Fred D. Griggs, a 1913 graduate of the school, and trustee from 1928 until his death on December 22, 1942. "Twilight Shadows" was the 1913 winning entry in the Interclass Singing Contest held at graduation, which began in 1910. According to Joseph B. Cobb, also of the class of 1913, Fred Griggs wrote the winning entries for 1910, 1911, and 1912 as well. The University of Massachusetts Minuteman Marching Band plays "Twilight Shadows" during their pregame show. It was published in a 1917 Massachusetts Agricultural College book, Massachusetts Agricultural College Songs second edition, edited by Ralph J. Watts, which also included four other pieces composed by Fred D. Griggs, and became the official alma mater, replacing a song in use since 1902, in 1962 The first edition of Massachusetts Agricultural College Songs had been published in 1912, edited by Edgar L. Ashley.

== Lyrics ==
When twilight shadows deepen
And the study hour draws nigh
When shades of night are falling
And the even'ng breezes sigh
'Tis then we love to gather
'Neath the pale moon's silv'ry spell
And lift our hearts and voices
In the songs we love so well

Sons of old Massachusetts
Devoted daughters true
Bay State, ol' Bay State
We'll give our best to you
Thee our alma mater
We'll cherish for all time
Should auld acquaintance be forgot
Massachusetts, yours and mine

== Composer ==
Junior Year M.A.C. INDEX Photograph

Frederick David Griggs was born on November 2, 1890, in Chicopee Falls, Massachusetts, and graduated from Chicopee High School. He was one of seven children, four boys and three girls.

Griggs graduated from the Massachusetts Agricultural College (now known as the University of Massachusetts Amherst) in 1913. By the time he graduated, he had served as a student reporter for the SPRINGFIELD REPUBLICAN. While in school he lettered in track, was president of the student senate, participated in the rifle team that won the intercollegiate championship for three years, and was a member of the Phi Sigma Kappa fraternity.

His interests covered a wide range, including participation in the drama society, Toastmasters, Y.M.C.A, the Glee Club (baritone), and was the percussionist for the orchestra, and a Music Leader for the Cadet Band. During his time at M.A.C. he composed several other songs, including a class song. Some of these are included in the same publication as "When Twilight Shadows Deepen". There is a quip in the M.A.C. class of 1913 INDEX, that Griggs autobiography would be easier to write if it was limited to "Things I have not done."

After graduation he did his graduate work at the University of Missouri School of Journalism continuing his study of Journalism and Economics.

Following his year at Missouri, he was assistant secretary and publicity agent of the Hampden County Improvement League in Massachusetts.

By 1917 he was the editor of the M.A.C. quarterly, Alumni Bulletin. Around the same time, he moved to Waltham to help organize the Middlesex County Extension Service, and later, the Massachusetts Farm Bureau Federation. In 1922 the House of the United States Congress listed him as Secretary of the Massachusetts Farm Bureau.

Griggs moved back to Springfield in 1925, and successfully ran for State Representative, from the fourth Hampden House District. He was reelected two years later.

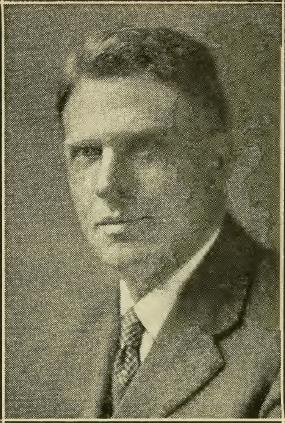
Griggs as a new state representative in 1925

Massachusetts Governor Alvan T. Fuller appointed Griggs to the board of trustees of the Massachusetts Agricultural College in 1928. Subsequent Governors reappointed him to the board of the school (renamed Massachusetts State College in 1931) until his death on December 22, 1942 (illness).

In the February 11, 1930, special election for the Massachusetts Second Congressional District, Griggs became the first Republican in 40 years to lose that seat in the U.S. Congress.

Beginning in 1935, Griggs was executive secretary for the Springfield Taxpayers Association, and was particularly active, through that office in municipal affairs and in constructive efforts toward improved government.

At the time of his passing he was married to Gladys M. (Hinkley) Griggs.
