= Massachusetts Instrumental and Choral Conductors Association =

The Massachusetts Instrumental and Choral Conductors Association (MICCA) is a sanctioning body for marching band field contests in the state of Massachusetts. Previous championships were held at Bowditch Field in Framingham, Massachusetts, Cawley Memorial Stadium in Lowell, Massachusetts, and Veterans Memorial Stadium in Lawrence, Massachusetts. Championships are now held at Veterans Memorial Stadium in Quincy, Massachusetts. Its current President is Ryan DeWolfe. Previous presidents included Dave Gresko, Steven Yavarow, and Mike Keough.

Yavarow is quoted in 2012 as saying that he had been president since 2003.

MICCA Festivals were canceled in April 2020 due to the 2019-2020 coronavirus pandemic.

== Marching Band Scoring Criteria ==
The Marching Band festivals are scored individually per group. Each groups is graded in 5 categories, receiving a score between 1 and 5 stars in each category. The categories are:

- Music - a grade of the style and execution of the musical selections
- Percussion - a grade of the quality of the percussion and pit ensembles
- Visual - a grade of drill design and execution, as well as marching technique
- Auxiliary - a grade of colorguard and other aspects of the performance not covered above
- General Effect - a grade of the overall impression of the show, including how well different aspects complement each other

The scores are then averaged together, with the overall average corresponding to different medals:

- 1–2.5 - Medal of Merit
- 2.5-3.5 - Bronze Medal
- 3.5-4.5 - Silver Medal
- 4.5-5 - Gold Medal
