= Altgeld Chimes =

Senior Memorial Chime
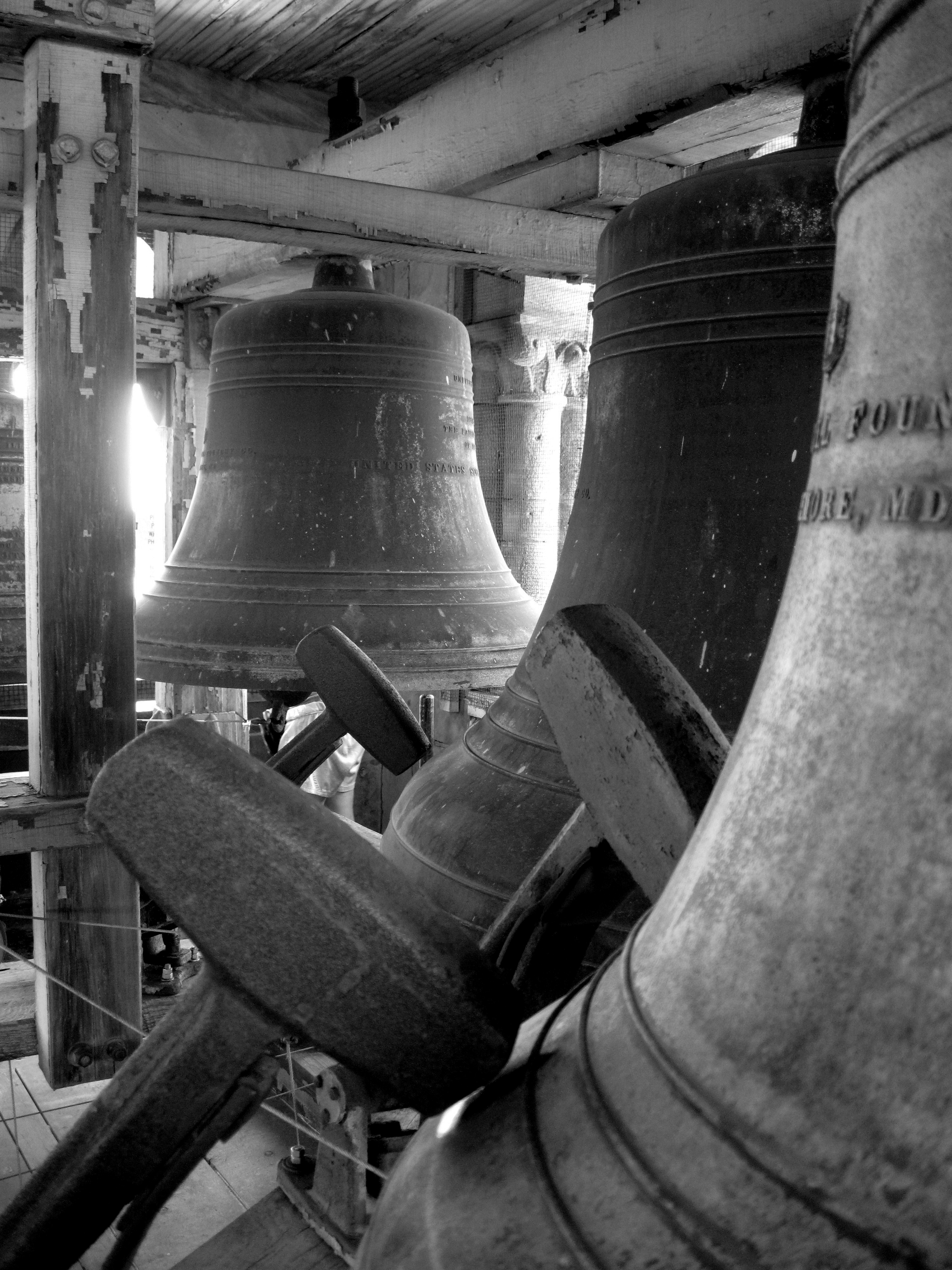
- The chime's three largest bells
- Interactive map of the Senior Memorial Chime area
- Alternative names: Altgeld Chimes

General information
- Type: Bell tower housing a chime
- Location: 323 Altgeld Hall; 1409 W. Green St. Urbana, Illinois 61801; United States
- Coordinates: 40°06′37″N 88°13′43″W
- Inaugurated: October 30, 1920
- Renovated: 1957, 2017
- Cost: $14,000 (equivalent to $225,000 in 2025)
- Owner: University of Illinois Urbana-Champaign

Height
- Height: 132 feet (40 m)

Design and construction
- Other designers: McShane Bell Foundry (bell casting & installation)

Website
- illinois.edu/chimes/

The Senior Memorial Chime, known more commonly as the Altgeld Chimes, is a 15-bell chime in Altgeld Hall Tower on the central campus of the University of Illinois Urbana-Champaign, in Urbana, Illinois, United States.

The chime was a gift from the graduating classes of 1914 through 1921 and the United States School of Military Aeronautics. They first rang at the university's tenth fall homecoming on October 30, 1920, and have since marked the hours and been used for chiming concerts. The chime is run and maintained by the university's School of Music as well as student and local volunteers.

== Overview ==
=== Bells ===
The Senior Memorial Chime's fifteen bells are hung dead in the top section of Altgeld Hall Tower's belfry. In total, they weigh seven and a half tons. They were cast in Baltimore, Maryland, by the McShane Bell Foundry. The largest bell weighs 3,050 pounds and measures five feet in diameter. On the north side of Altgeld Hall at the base of the tower is a bronze plaque detailing the dedications of the instrument. According to the plaque, only the three largest bells have dedications. The largest is dedicated to Edmund J. James, university president from 1904 to 1920. The second largest is dedicated to the men trained by the United States School of Military Aeronautics. The third largest is inscribed with the quote: "Through these chimes the classes of 1914—21 call the multiplying and majestic company of students and graduates to join them in gratitude, loyalty, and devotion to their alma mater."

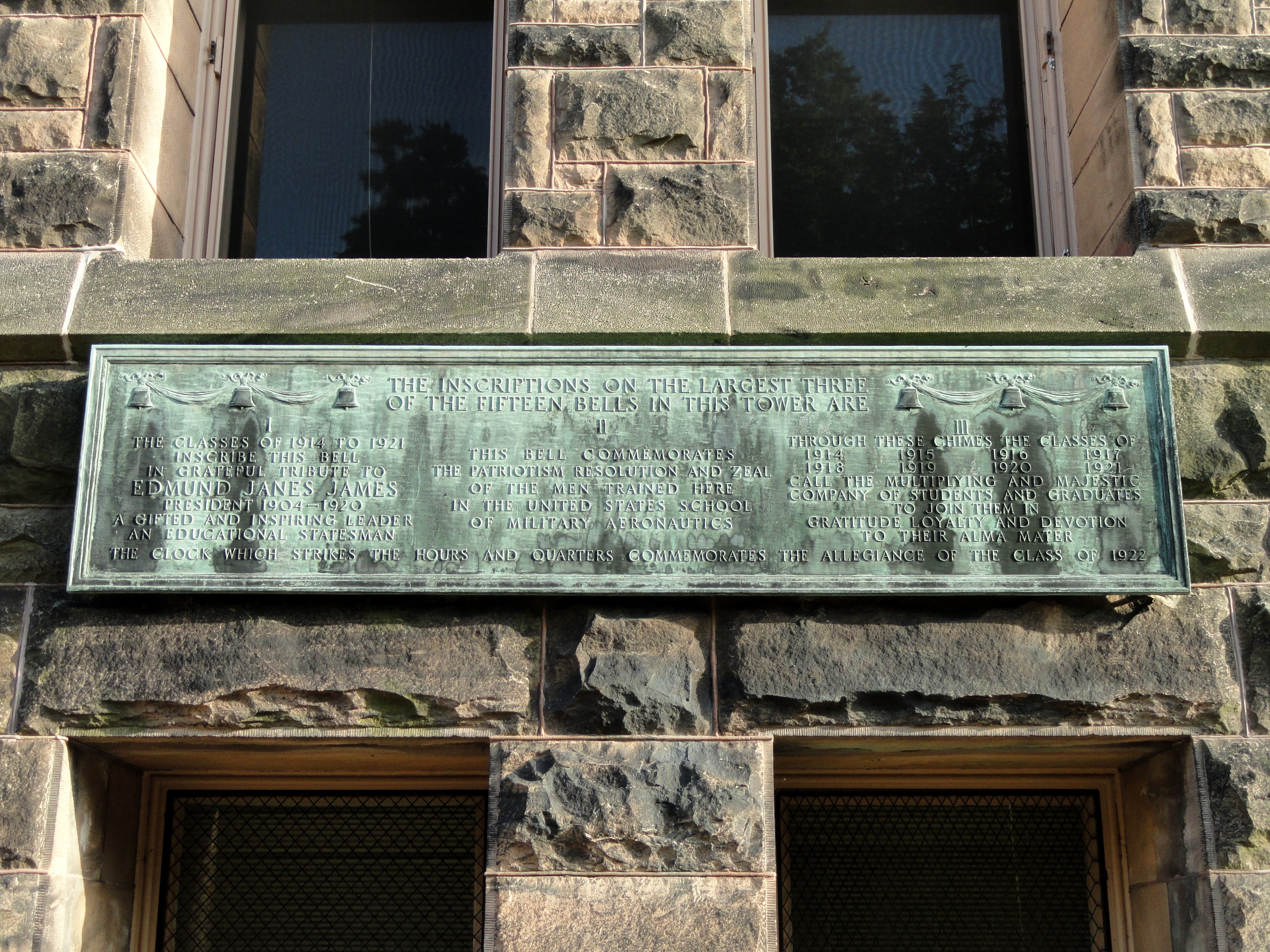
The bronze plaque at the base of Altgeld Hall Tower detailing the inscriptions on the three largest bells.

=== Clock ===
The class of 1922 donated a Seth Thomas clock to allow the chime to automatically ring the full- and quarter hours of the day (this is also mentioned in the bronze plaque on the side of the tower). The clock rings the four lowest bells with a system of transmission wires separate from that of the playing chamber's chimestand. Using a set of hammers hitting the outer side of each bell, it plays the Westminster Chimes. The Seth Thomas clock does not currently function.

=== Playing chamber ===
The playing chamber is seven stories above ground level and contains a keyboard called a chimestand. It was manufactured by McShane Bell Foundry specifically for the instrument with a lever for each of its bells. When a lever is pushed down, it causes a clapper to hit the bell's sound bow via a steel transmission cable. The scale of the keyboard ranges from a low D to a high G (one and a half octaves above), but missing the low D♯ and both F♮s.

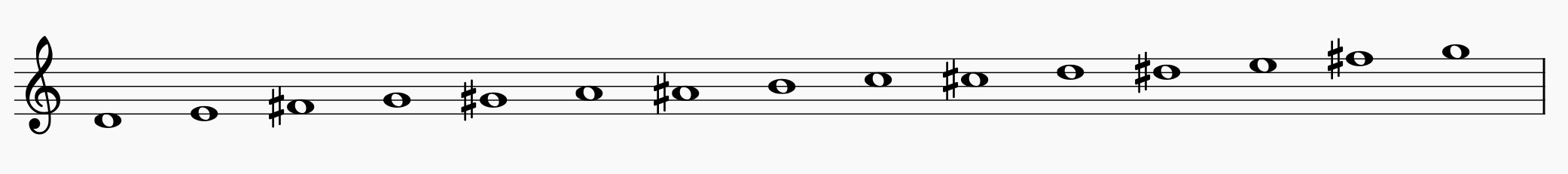
The available notes of the Senior Memorial Chime. The notes form the D major diatonic scale with added semitones G♯, A♯, C♮, and D♯.

This configuration of notes was purposeful, specifically to allow the instrument to play the university's school song, "Illinois Loyalty". Because of the missing notes and the limited keyboard range, much of the music for the instrument must be transposed and/or rearranged. Since there are no F♮s, music is usually transposed to keys not containing the note, such as G major, D major, or A major.

=== Chimesplayers ===
Players of the chime, or chimesplayers, organize under a registered student organization called the Altgeld Ringers. They host regular concerts every weekday classes are in session from 12:50 to 1:00 PM. Concerts are also performed during special occasions, such as Homecoming Weekend, the University of Illinois Founders Day, Commencement Evening, and other holidays. Informal concerts are held randomly throughout the day during the last ten minutes of the hour. It is tradition to play the university's alma mater, "Hail to the Orange", during every concert.

The leader of the chimesplayers is called the chimesmaster. Since its inception, the chime has usually had a chimesmaster present, though the university did not officially recognize it as a leadership position until September 2017. The responsibilities of the chimesmaster include supervising the chimesplayers, performing routine maintenance, and serving as the representative of the instrument. Since 1958, there have been five university chimesmasters.

Chimesmasters of the University of Illinois since 1958
Chimesmaster	Tenure
Albert Emmett Marien	1958 — 1994
Susanne Kathryn Wood	1994 — 2017
Jonathon Murray Smith	2018 — 2019
Christina Marie Horton	2019 — 2021
Michael Broussard	2021 — Present

== History ==
=== Inception ===
The University of Illinois class of 1914 decided to purchase a chime for the university in conjunction with the next seven senior classes. Hale P. "Pete" Daugherty, known by his peers as the "Father of the Chimes," used his power as the editor of the Daily Illini to campaign for its adoption. Hazen S. Capron, chairman of the First National Bank of Champaign, proposed a method by which each senior class would contribute $1,000 towards a fund which would be invested at the bank. By the time the fund reaches $10,000 or more, a chime would be purchased. This method was quickly adopted by the class of 1914, and they successfully raised the first $1,000 towards the Senior Memorial Chime.

The fund grew slowly during the next five years. Not only did the classes of 1915-1919 struggle to raise $1,000, but the funds drew a surprisingly small amount of interest due to World War I. By early 1920, Victor Cullin '20 led the charge to raise $4,000 amongst members of the classes of 1920 and 1921, which would bring the total balance raised to $10,000 and allow an eleven-bell chime to be purchased. His campaign was so successful that $5,000 was raised, allowing for the purchase of a thirteen-bell set. By the time a contract was ready to be signed, Dean Thomas Arkle Clark asked if the thirteen-bell chime could play the melody of "Illinois Loyalty." As it turned out, this would require an additional two bells, and he blocked the purchase. He quickly realized that a roughly $2,500 memorial fund raised by the United States School of Military Aeronautics could be used for the project so long as one of the bells was dedicated in its honor.

The bells were purchased for around $14,000 from the McShane Bell Company of Baltimore, Maryland. All communication and contract work was handled by Prof. James McLaren White, supervising architect of the university. After the bells were cast, they were visited and inspected by Albert Austin Harding, Director Bands and Lloyd Morey, university comptroller. Under provisions of the contract, McShane delivered and installed the chime in time for the university's tenth homecoming celebration.

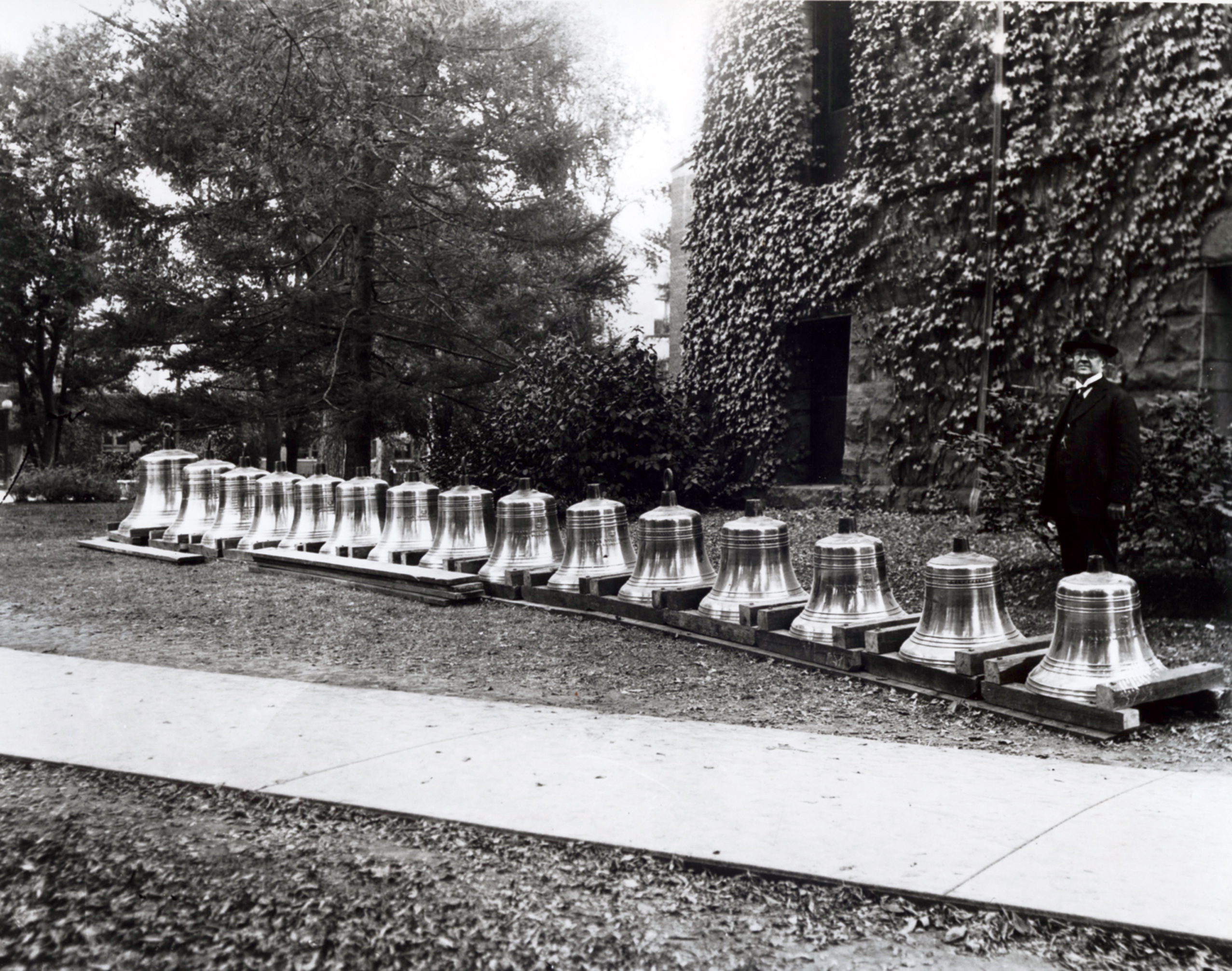
Edmund J. James standing behind the fifteen bells before installation at the base of Altgeld Hall Tower.

On October 30, 1920, at 10:00 AM, hundreds of students, faculty, alumni, and locals gathered around Altgeld Hall Tower for the dedication ceremony. Victor Cullin '20 formally presented the chime to the university. Trustee Robert Ward '03 gave an acceptance speech on behalf of the board of trustees. President Kinley spoke and formally dedicated the instrument. At the end of the program, a McShane employee rang the chime for the first time, playing "By Thy Rivers Gently Flowing", "Adeste Fidelis", "Doxology", and others before ending with "Illinois Loyalty".

=== Early history ===
Little is known about the history of the Senior Memorial Chime after the first day of its existence, though it is known to have been played regularly up until 1941. By then, the chime had deteriorated to the point that renovations on the scale of $10,000 were required. The university, with the support of the University of Illinois Foundation renovated the chime during the building's renovation in 1956–1957.

=== Tenures of Albert Marien and Sue Wood (1958–2017) ===
In 1958, the School of Music invited university auditor Albert Marien to be the new chimesmaster. He started out by himself before creating a team of student chimesplayers. By the time Marien developed a formal program of instruction, the Senior Memorial Chime was hosting concerts and public tours daily. This would continue on for the next 60 years. Sue Wood, a plant pathologist at the university, became acquainted with the Senior Memorial Chime in 1971. She joined Marien's program and eventually succeeded him as chimesmaster in 1994 until her retirement in 2017.

== The "Carillon Upgrade Project" ==
Throughout Marien's tenure as chimesmaster, he heavily promoted the idea to upgrade the Senior Memorial Chime to a four-octave carillon, or to leave the chime as it was and build the carillon as a separate instrument in a campanile, which has been suggested in the university's campus plan numerous times since 1913. By upgrading the chime to a carillon (or building the instrument separately), it would permit the playing of the large wealth of carillon music that is made available through organizations such as The Guild of Carillonneurs in North America. By the time Marien retired in 1994, the University of Illinois Foundation had secured enough funding to purchase a 347-pound F♮ bell, which was dedicated to Marien in recognition of his role with the chime and its upgrade project. The bell currently sits in a display case at the University of Illinois Willard Airport. In 1998, the foundation established a fund to receive donations for the project. All donations above $1,000 would earn the donor recognition in the form of a bronze plaque at the base of the carillon tower. The funding for the bells – approximately $500,000 – was eventually secured; however, it was found that Altgeld Hall Tower could not support the additional weight (nearly eight tons of bronze, plus several tons of steel structures). In response, the university revived plans to build a campanile to house the carillon. This led to the construction of the McFarland Memorial Bell Tower on the South Quad.

== Media and community involvement ==
The chime receives a constant stream of media attention. Both university and local organizations and news outlets regularly conduct interviews of chimesplayers and -masters, such as the university math department, The Daily Illini, and the Illinois Alumni Association. In August 2017, the university's Office of Public Affairs published a documentary of the chime as told by the then current chimesplayers, and in December 2014, chimesmaster Susanne Wood was showcased in their holiday greeting video.

The Altgeld Ringers maintain a regular presence on social media channels, where they announce important events, such as special concert dates, and interact with the local community. Some of the special concerts they have hosted have been in observance of national events, such as Silent Day (part of the International Week of the Deaf).

In December 2012, the chime participated in a national observance of the Sandy Hook Elementary School shooting, where bell towers across the country rang 26 times – one for each victim at the school.

In September 2015, the Altgeld Ringers turned the chime into a "jukebox" for three hours, where they took song requests. For a $1—2 donation, anyone could request a song to be radioed up to the playing chamber and played immediately.

In February 2017, university professor Stephen Andrew Taylor composed a piece of music titled "Archaea" to be played by both the university's chime and its carillon as part of the kickoff festivities for the celebration of its sesquicentennial.

In November 2019, after the death of Chimesmaster Emeritus Susanne Wood, the Altgeld Ringers hosted a public memorial service and concert her remembrance.

The Altgeld Chimes celebrated its centennial on October 30, 2020, one hundred years to the day of the original dedication ceremony in 1920. The event was marked with a series of events run by the Altgeld Ringers and Chimesmaster Tina Horton. Starting October 25, the chime hosted "Decades Concerts," in which ten sets of songs from each decade since the chime was installed were played. On October 30, Chimesmaster Horton and the Marching Illini played a celebratory concert that was live-streamed to the public. The program included songs from concerts a century ago. Later that evening, the members of the Altgeld Ringers hosted a second centennial concert. On October 31, the Altgeld Ringers hosted the "Concert for the Future of the Chimes," which consisted of the winners of the composition contest they hosted and Halloween-themed selections.

== 2017 Renovation controversy and the future of the chime ==
On March 19, 2017, the university's News Bureau issued a statement that the chime would be closed indefinitely. Tours of the instrument and its regular concerts would be halted, but the automated timekeeping chimes would continue to ring. The renovations were an extension of the larger project to update Altgeld Hall and Illini Hall. Campus spokeswoman Robin Kaler said the funds for the tower's initial repairs will come from the Office of the Provost, and that it will reopen when it is compliant with all current safety codes.

For members of the Altgeld Ringers, this marked the end of a six-month period of hectic, ambiguous communication with the university on the future of the chime. On October 19, 2016, the university administration instructed the group to shut down all public tours effective immediately, in response to finding violations of the fire code and Americans with Disabilities Act during inspections. Chimesplayers were still expected to play the instrument regularly, so as to not bring attention to the tower's status. They were also not allowed to inform campus that the tower was closed, or that tours were no longer possible, meaning they needed to sneak into the playing chamber to avoid people waiting for a tour. The university unofficially reopened the tower on January 26, 2017, though no changes to the tower in relation to code violations were observed. Discontent amongst the Altgeld Ringers compelled math adviser and chimesplayer Ernesto Machado to send an email on March 8, 2017, to Associate Provost for Capital Planning Matthew Tomaszewski, who oversees Altgeld Hall Tower. The group requested information on the administration's expected plans for the tower, the position of chimesmaster to become an official, paid position, a public announcement of Chimesmaster Emeritus Sue Wood's retirement, a ceremony in honor of her years of voluntary service, and to expedite necessary repairs in the tower. Tomaszewski responded, stating, "I write to inform you [Ernesto Machado] that your volunteer services are no longer needed in any capacity regarding the Altgeld chimes. Your volunteer role ends effective today, Monday, March 13, 2017."

In September 2017, Tomaszewski announced the recognition of chimesmaster as an official leadership position. The university's College of Fine and Applied Arts and the School of Music appointed Jonathon Smith as Wood's replacement. Significant updates to the safety of the playing chamber were made. In addition, the university partnered with the Verdin Company to restore and maintain the integrity of the chime. By the end of the 2018 academic year, the tower had officially reopened to Smith and the Altgeld Ringers. Tours to the public remain unavailable. Chimesplayers continue to voice their dissatisfaction with the change, citing its "crucial importance" for recruiting new chimesplayers.

The first removal of the bells since installation in 1920 happened in 2025 as part of a major renovation project for Altgeld Hall.

== See also ==
- Cornell Chimes
