= Big Game (American football) =

College football rivalry between UC Berkeley and Stanford

The Big Game
- California Golden Bears Stanford Cardinal
- First meeting: March 19, 1892; Stanford, 14–10
- Latest meeting: November 21, 2026; Stanford, 44–28
- Next meeting: 2027, in Stanford, California
- Trophy: Stanford Axe

Statistics
- Total meetings: 129
- All-time series: Stanford leads, 67–51–11 (.562)
- Largest victory: Stanford, 63–13 (2013)
- Longest win streak: Stanford, 9 (2010–2018)
- Current win streak: Stanford, 2 (2025–present)

Locations of Cal and Stanford

The Big Game is the name given to the California–Stanford football rivalry game. It is an American college football rivalry game played by the California Golden Bears football team of the University of California, Berkeley, and the Stanford Cardinal football team of Stanford University. Both institutions are located in the San Francisco Bay Area. First played in 1892, it remains one of the oldest college rivalries in the United States. The game is usually played in late November or early December and its location alternates between the two universities every year. In even-numbered years, the game is played in Berkeley while odd-numbered years are played at Stanford.

== Name ==
The "Big Game" name was adopted in 1902 to highlight its importance to both schools. Then-Cal quarterback Fernando Mendoza said in 2024 that it is "called the Big Game because there's a lot at stake."

In March 2007, the National Football League announced that it intended to trademark the phrase "The Big Game" in reference to the Super Bowl. Since "Super Bowl" is trademarked by the league, the NFL wanted to clamp down on companies alluding to the game via the "Big Game" moniker. The plan was eventually dropped after being faced with opposition from Cal and Stanford.

== Series history ==
=== First years ===
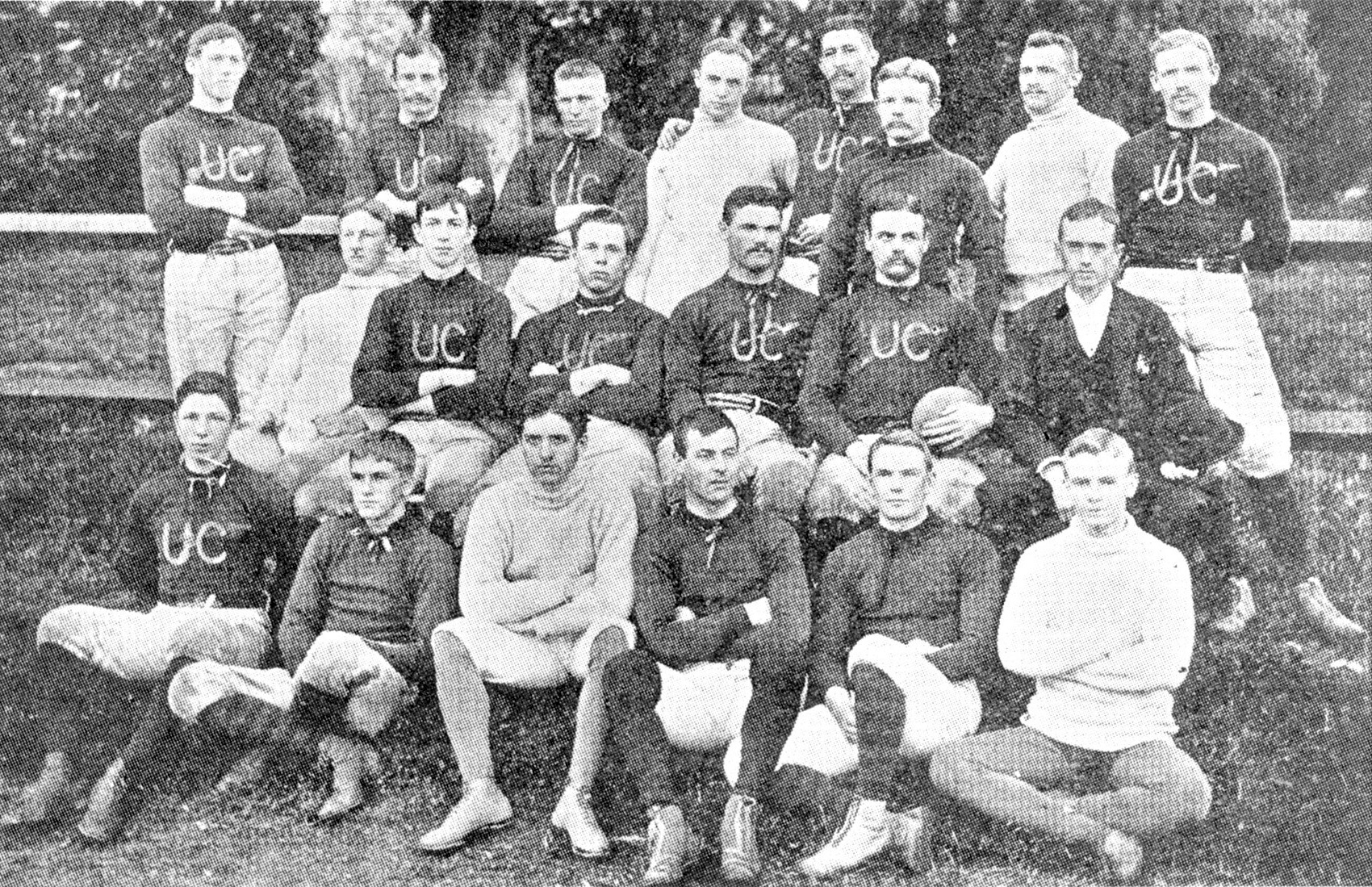
1892 Cal football team

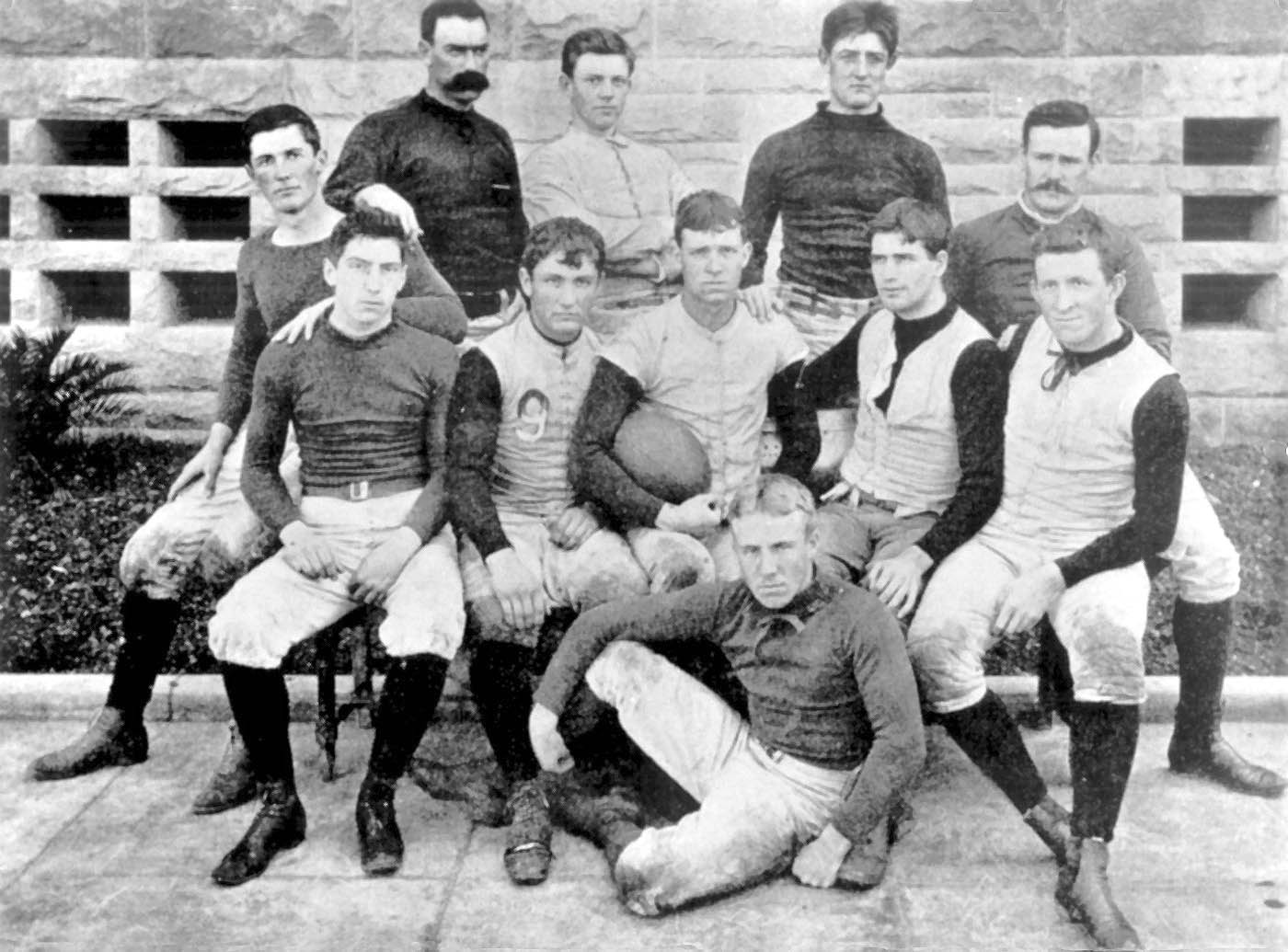
Inaugural Stanford football team, 1892

The Big Game is the oldest college football rivalry in the West. While an undergraduate at Stanford, future U.S. President Herbert Hoover was the student manager of both the baseball and football teams. He helped organize the inaugural Big Game, along with his friend Cal manager Herbert Lang. Only 10,000 tickets were printed for the game but 20,000 people showed up. Hoover and Lang scrambled to find pots, bowls and any other available receptacles to collect the admission fees.

By 1900 the match was already referred to as the "Big Game". In 1898, Berkeley alumnus and San Francisco Mayor James D. Phelan purchased a casting of Douglas Tilden's The Football Players bronze sculpture and offered it as a prize to the school that could win the football game two years in a row. Berkeley responded by shutting Stanford out in 1898 and 1899, and the sculpture was installed on the Berkeley campus atop a stone pedestal engraved with the names of the players and the donor during a dedication ceremony held May 12, 1900.

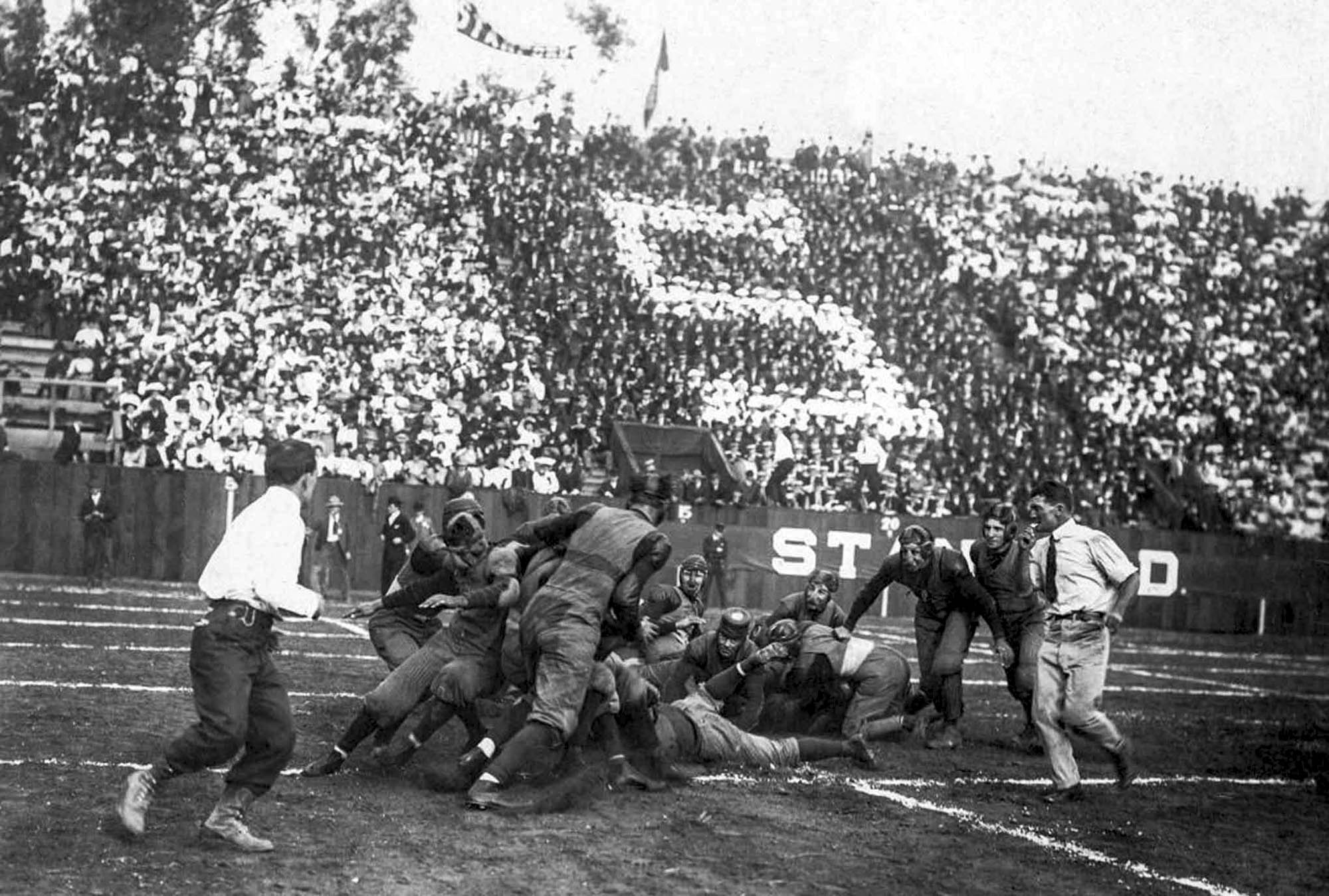
The 1905 Big Game played at Stanford

During the 1900 Big Game, played at the Recreation Park stadium on Thanksgiving Day in San Francisco, a large group of fans were observing from the roof of the nearby S.F. and Pacific Glass Works factory. With somewhere between 600 and 1,000 spectators atop it, the rooftop collapsed, resulting in well over 100 men falling to the factory's floor and more than 60 directly onto the massive, blazing furnace. In total 23 men and boys were killed, and more than 100 severely injured. To this day, the "Thanksgiving Day Disaster" remains the deadliest accident to kill spectators at a U.S. sporting event.

=== Violence and switch to rugby ===
In 1906, citing concerns about the violence in football, both schools dropped football in favor of rugby union, which was played for the Big Games of 1906–1918. During that time the matches were played under Union rules of rugby per an agreement between Stanford and Cal coaches along with other West coast teams, including Nevada, St. Mary's, Santa Clara, and USC (in 1911). Specialist rugby union referees were on occasion invited, including from Sydney in Australia.

The first incidence of card stunts was performed by Cal fans at the halftime of the 1910 Big Game.

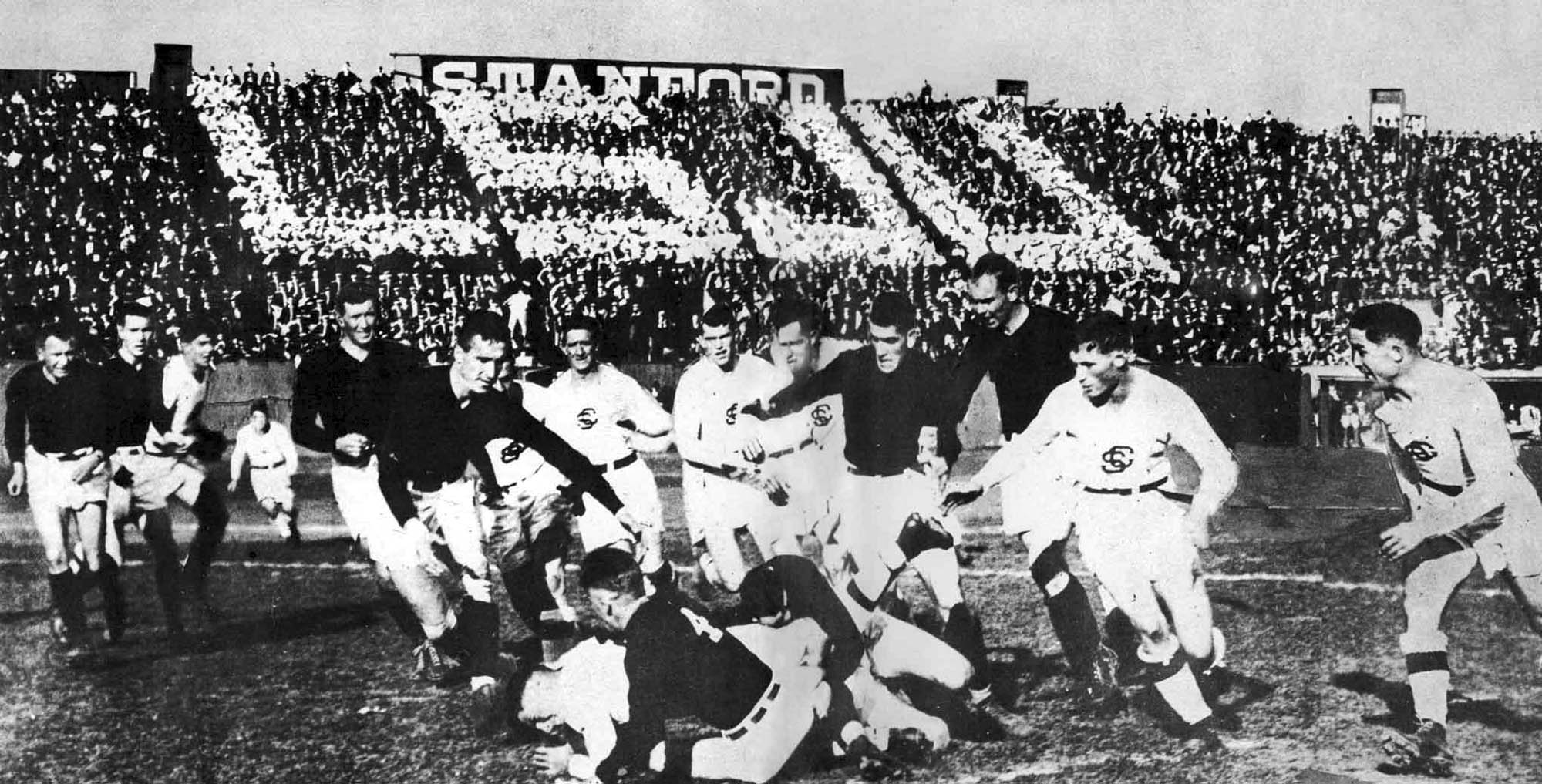
Stanford v Santa Clara (in white) under the rugby rules. Santa Clara attended the game in three successive editions after Cal resumed football.

While Stanford's rugby teams continued until 1917, Cal switched back to American football in 1915. Its official reason for withdrawal from its 1915 rugby match against Stanford was the disagreement over Stanford's play of freshmen on their varsity team, however it was apparent that Cal intended to withdraw from the agreement to play rugby and instead play football against western schools that continued playing football or switched back several years earlier. Cal's Big Game was played in the years 1915–17, against Washington, games which aren't listed in Big Game records. Cal lost its 1915, home Big Game to University of Washington 72–0, while Stanford played rugby against its new Big Game opponent Santa Clara University, which would take Cal's place for three successive seasons.

The 1918 game, in which Cal prevailed 67–0, is not considered an official game because Stanford's football team was composed of volunteers from the Student Army Training Corps stationed at Stanford, some of whom were not Stanford students. In 1919, Stanford officially switched back to playing football.

=== Return to football ===
The game resumed as football in 1919, and has been played as such every year since, except from 1943 to 1945, when Stanford shut down its football program due to World War II. A handful of Stanford starters—including guards Jim Cox, Bill Hachten and Fred Boensch, running back George Quist and halfback Billy Agnew—shifted to Cal in order to continue playing. Quist returned to Stanford, playing against Cal in the 1946 Big Game.

Scenes for the Harold Lloyd silent classic The Freshman were filmed at California Memorial Stadium during halftime of the 1924 Big Game.

Since 1933, the victor of the game has been awarded possession of the Stanford Axe. If a game ended in a tie, the Axe stayed on the side that already possessed it; this rule became obsolete in 1996 when the NCAA instituted overtime. The Axe is a key part of the rivalry's history, having been stolen on several occasions by both sides, starting in 1899, when the Axe was introduced when Stanford yell leader Billy Erb used it at a baseball game between the two schools.

In 2013, the new Levi's Stadium in Santa Clara was proposed as the site of the 2014 Big Game, which according to the traditional rotation should be played at Cal's Memorial Stadium. The 2015 game would then be held in Berkeley, reversing the current rotation of odd-numbered years at Stanford and even-numbered years at Cal. However, several days later Cal declined the offer.

== Pregame traditions ==
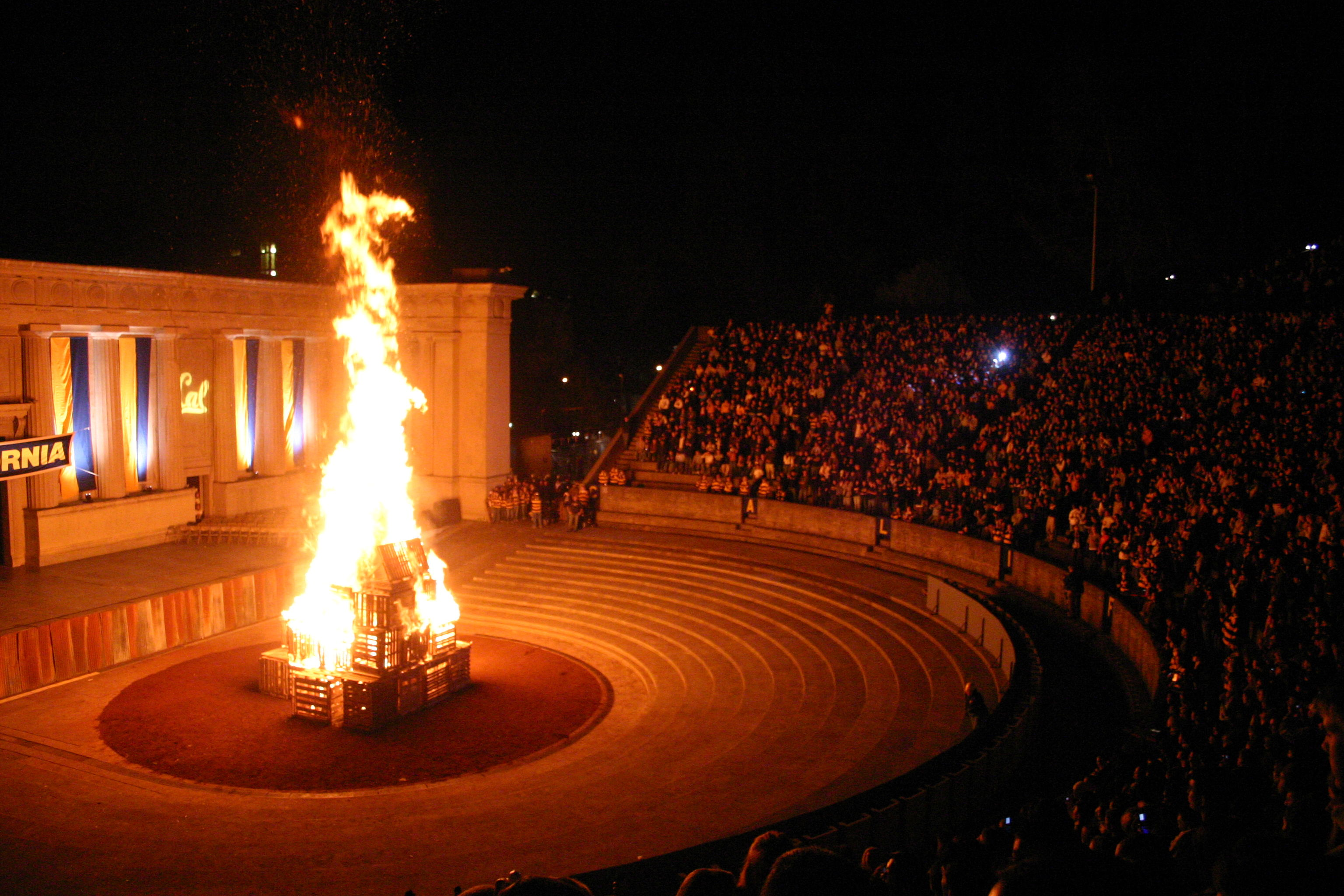
2006 Cal Big Game Bonfire Rally

In the week before the game, both schools celebrate the occasion with rallies, reunions, and luncheons. Early in the week, Cal celebrates in San Francisco with an annual cable car rally, usually held on the Monday of Big Game Week by the UC Rally Committee. Various other rallies and celebrations take place at Cal throughout the week, including noon rallies, night rallies that go to all the dorms, singing competitions, and alumni reunions. The highlight of the week is when Cal students hold a traditional pep rally and bonfire at the Hearst Greek Theatre on the eve of the game, known as the Big Game Bonfire Rally.

Stanford students stage the Gaieties, a theatrical production that both celebrates and pokes fun at the rivalry. The week also includes various other athletic events including "The Big Splash" (water polo), "The Big Spike" (volleyball), "The Big Sweep" (Quidditch), "The Big Freeze" (ice hockey), "The Big Sail" (sailing), and the Ink Bowl, a touch football game between the members of the two schools' newspapers.

=== Cal ===
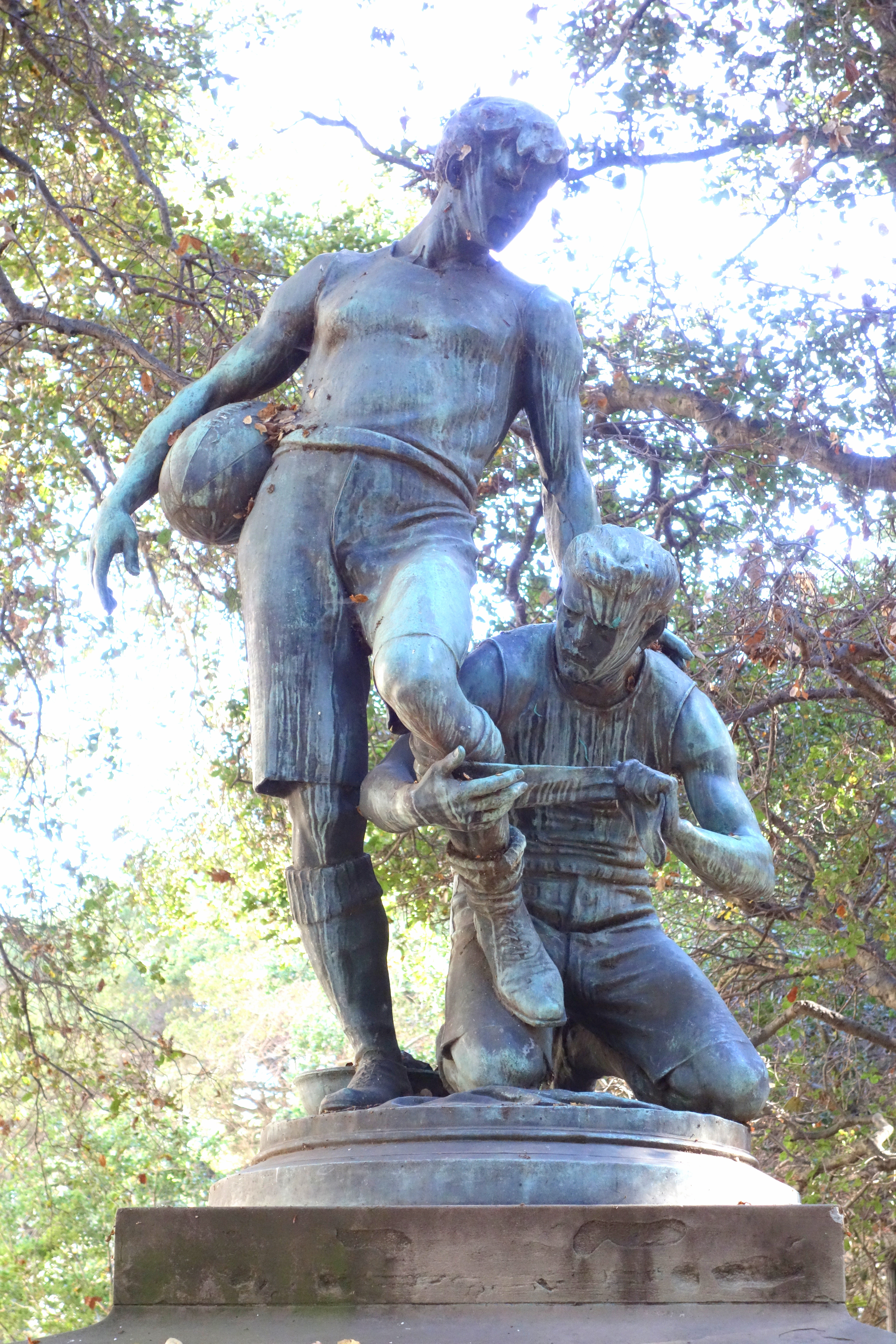
The Football Players, sculpture by Douglas Tilden, placed in the University of California, Berkeley

The Big Game Bonfire Rally is a pep and bonfire rally that takes place at University of California, Berkeley in Hearst Greek Theatre on the eve of Big Game. More than 10,000 students gather to hear the history about The Stanford Axe and Big Game. The University of California Rally Committee is in charge of the planning and setting up the bonfire, as well as refueling it during the rally. Specifically, freshman members of the UC Rally Committee, as well as freshman band members are sent out with pallets to the chanting of "freshmen, more wood." Several alumni show up to perform traditional rituals. A tradition unique to Cal is the performance of the Haka, a traditional Maori war dance/chant. Traditionally performed by an alumni Yell Leader, the Haka performed was written in the 1960s by a Cal rugby player of Maori descent. The traditional Axe Yell is also made and visits from the UC Men's Octet and Golden Overtones are always expected. The University of California Marching Band is also present, playing traditional Cal songs throughout the duration of the Rally. The highlight of the Rally is the lighting of Big Game Bonfire itself, with the fire reaching its zenith at over eight stories.

The Big Game Bonfire Rally always ends with the reciting of a speech known as the "Andy Smith Eulogy" or "The Spirit of California". Written by Garff Wilson in remembrance of the fabled Cal football coach, who led the Bears to five straight undefeated seasons starting in 1919 before tragically dying of pneumonia in 1925, the speech closes the Rally annually since 1949. During the speech, candles are passed out among the attendants and are lit for the singing of the campus alma mater, "All Hail Blue and Gold."

In 2012, the Big Game Bonfire Rally was moved to Edwards Stadium and the bonfire was cancelled due to a scheduling conflict with a Bob Dylan concert. Due to TV contracts, the Pac-12 Conference rescheduled the Big Game from its traditional season-ending slot to October 20, and the Greek Theatre was already booked for the Bob Dylan concert. This was the first time the bonfire had not been held since 1892. The bonfire portion of the rally was cancelled again in 2015 due to the ongoing drought. In 2016, the Fiat Lux torch was added as a symbol of light, with, "For the flames of the past, spirit of the present, and light of the future" engraved on it. In 2018, the big game was rescheduled due to the unhealthy air quality caused by the Camp Fire. All fire/pyrotechnical elements were cut from the rally. The UC Rally Committee immediately began preparations to re-invent the traditional wood burning structure, as they did not want the fire to extinguish like it had almost 30 years earlier at Stanford. In November 2019, a new sheet metal bonfire structure was unveiled. The 2024 edition of the Big Game Bonfire Rally was cancelled due to excessive rain and flooding.

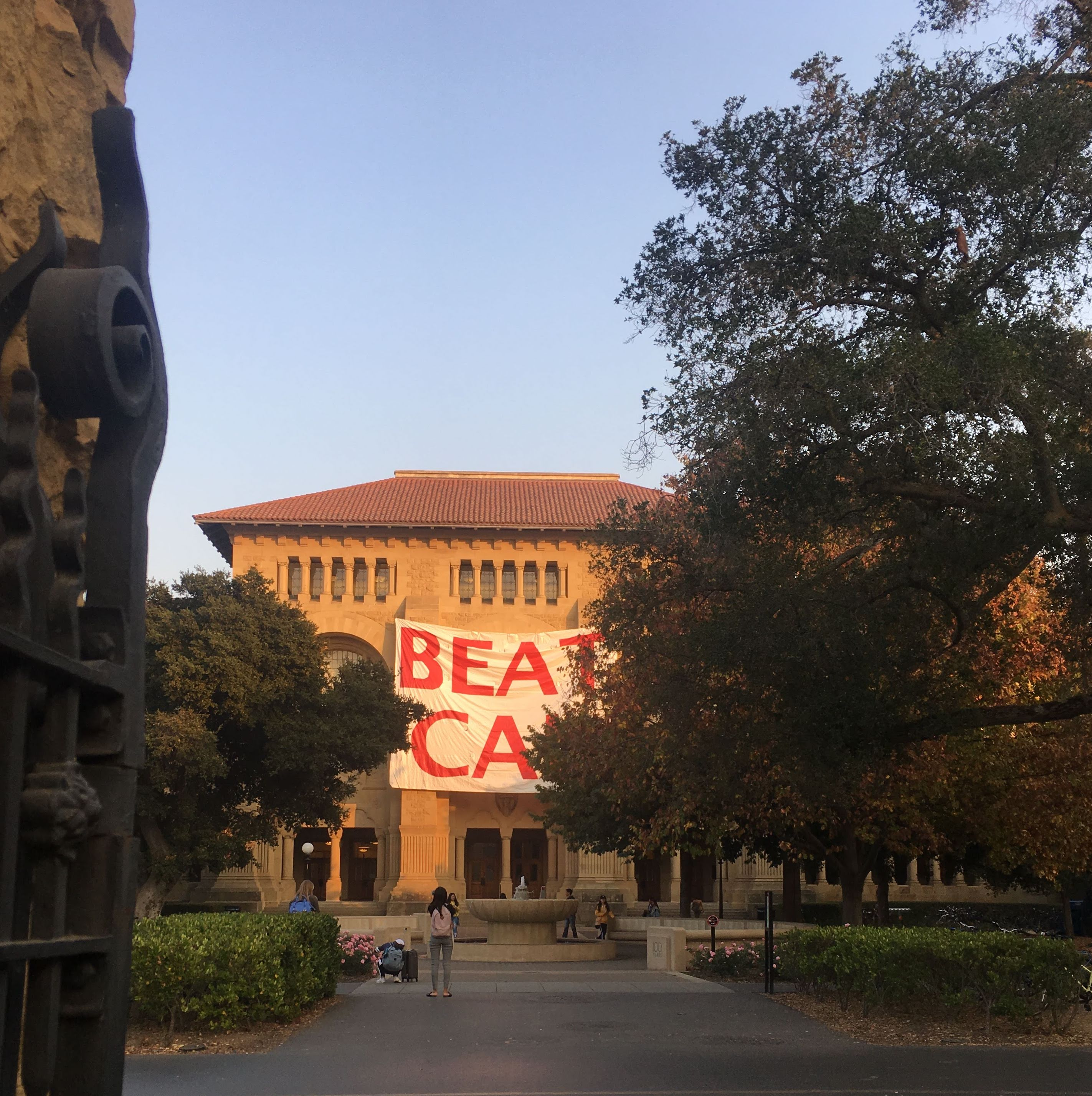
"Beat Cal" banner hanging over the western entrance to Green Library.

=== Stanford ===
For decades, Stanford also has held a bonfire on the dry lakebed of Lake Lagunita, but this was discontinued in the 1990s due to the lake being a habitat for the vulnerable California tiger salamander. Stanford now holds a Big Game Rally on Angell Field organized by the Stanford Axe Committee. With appearances from the senior football players and various performance groups, it serves to kick off Big Game Week. The story of The Stanford Axe is told by Hal Mickelson, and the Axe Yell is performed by the Yell Leaders of The Stanford Axe Committee. The rally ends with a performance by the Leland Stanford Junior University Marching Band and a fireworks show. A student-produced play called "Gaieties," an annual Big Game week tradition since 1911, pokes fun at Cal and serves to pump students up for the Big Game. Another part of Stanford's tradition was the annual hanging of the substantial "Beat Cal" banner upon the four story Meyer Library building. This tradition came to an end in 2014 before the building was demolished. Since 2015, the banner has been hung over the western entrance to Green Library.

== Notable games ==
=== 1924 ===
Both teams came into the game unbeaten with a berth in the 1925 Rose Bowl on the line. With its star Ernie Nevers sidelined due to injuries, Stanford trailed 20–6 with under 5 minutes to go, but rallied to score twice to force a 20–20 tie and earn the Rose Bowl bid.

=== 1947 ===
In the 50th Big Game, winless Stanford led the 8–1 Bears with less than three minutes left in the game, but Cal scored on an 80-yard touchdown pass to clinch a 21–18 victory.

=== 1959 ===
Stanford quarterback Dick Norman threw for 401 yards (then an NCAA record, and still a Big Game record), but it was not enough to hold off the Bears, who won 20–17.

=== 1972 ===
Cal drove 62 yards in the final 1:13, culminating in a Vince Ferragamo touchdown pass to Steve Sweeney for a last-second 24–22 Cal victory.

=== 1974 ===
Mike Langford nailed a 50-yard field goal on the final play for a 22–20 Stanford triumph over the 19th-ranked Bears.

=== 1982: The Play ===
The 85th Big Game on November 20, 1982, produced one of the most memorable finishes in college football history. Trailing 19–17 late in the fourth quarter, Stanford—led by quarterback John Elway—drove into field-goal range on a series that included a key 21-yard run by Mike Dotterer and earlier touchdown receptions by Vincent White, who had caught two scoring passes in the second half. With eight seconds left, Mark Harmon converted a 35-yard field goal to give Stanford a 20–19 lead. A Cardinal victory would likely have earned an invitation to the Hall of Fame Classic bowl game.

On the ensuing kickoff, California executed a five-lateral return involving Kevin Moen, Richard Rodgers Sr., Dwight Garner, and Mariet Ford. Moen, the initial returner, ultimately scored a touchdown while colliding with Stanford trombone player Gary Tyrrell, who had run onto the field with the Stanford Band to celebrate prematurely. California won 25–20. The moment was immortalized by KGO radio announcer Joe Starkey, who called it "the most amazing, sensational, dramatic, heartrending, exciting, thrilling finish in the history of college football!"

The Play’s legality remains a matter of debate among Stanford fans, centered on whether Garner’s knee was down before a lateral and whether Ford’s final pitch to Moen was forward. In 2007, Pac-10 instant-replay supervisor Verle Sorgen reviewed enhanced footage under modern NCAA replay standards and concluded that the fifth lateral "clearly appears forward." He added, "I would be tempted to reverse it… then go out and get the motor running in my car." Despite the controversy, officials upheld the result: California 25, Stanford 20.

=== 1986 ===
Cal was 1–9 in the conference, while Stanford was 7–2 and ranked 16th in the nation. Cal's defense dominated the game – Stanford's quarterback John Paye was sacked seven times, while Stanford's running game was held to 41 yards. Cal won the game 17–11. It was the last game of Cal's coach Joe Kapp, who also coached the Golden Bears in 1982, his first season, when Cal won the Big Game following The Play.

=== 1988 ===
With the score tied, Cal marched to the Stanford 3-yard line with 4 seconds remaining in the game. Called "the Cadillac of kickers in college football" by Cal coach Bruce Snyder, all Pac-10 and future all-American Robbie Keen lined up for a 21-yard field goal attempt to win the game on the final play. When the ball was snapped, Stanford redshirt freshman Tuan Van Le raced from the left end of the defensive line to block the kick and preserve a 19–19 tie. As Stanford was the holder of the Axe going into the game, the tie meant the Axe returned to the Farm for another year. The result was celebrated in the stadium as a victory by Stanford as the Axe was paraded by the Stanford Axe Committee and football players before jubilant Cardinal fans, with stunned Bears fans looking on. This was the only Big Game to end in a tie after 1953 and, under current overtime rules, may be the last Big Game to end tied.

=== 1990 ===
This game had echoes of the 1982 game due to late seesaw scoring, the critical role of fans on the field, and the winning points being scored as time expired. It has been called "The Payback" or "The Revenge of the Play" by Stanford fans.

After trailing since the first quarter, left-footed Stanford kicker John Hopkins kicked his fourth field goal of the game with 9:56 left to give Stanford its first lead at 18–17. Cal responded with a touchdown, and added a two-point conversion to lead 25–18 with 6:03 left. Stanford stopped Cal on a third and 6 on the Stanford 46 with 2:06 left to play. After Cal's punt, Stanford took its final possession on its own 13 with 1:54 left. Escaping two near interceptions and converting a 4th and 6, Stanford moved the ball to the Cal 19 with seventeen seconds left. After quarterback Jason Palumbis threw a touchdown pass to Ed McCaffrey in the end zone to make it 25–24, Cardinal coach Dennis Green quickly went for a two-point conversion, with no overtime, and despite the fact that a tie would keep the Axe at Stanford for another year.

After Palumbis' pass into the end zone was intercepted by John Hardy, Cal fans, players and team officials – believing they had won the game and the Axe – invaded the field and caused a lengthy delay before police, stadium security and officials restored order, with officials assessing Cal a 15-yard delay of game penalty.

Now kicking from the 50-yard line with twelve seconds left, Hopkins bounced the ensuing onside kick off a Cal player and, after being touched by seven players, the ball was recovered by Stanford's Dan Byers on the Cal 37. With nine seconds left and no time outs remaining, a pass attempt to McCaffrey to set up a field goal fell short, but officials assessed Cal a 15-yard penalty after Palumbis was roughed on the play, moving the ball to the 22-yard line. With five seconds remaining, Hopkins kicked a 39-yard field goal into the wind, giving Stanford a 27–25 victory as time expired, with Stanford fans, players and team officials invading the field in celebration.

The roughing the passer penalty was contested by Cal team coaches and Cal fans alike.

The late passing and kicking excitement overshadowed two excellent running performances by Cal's Russell White (177 yards and 2 TD's) and Stanford's Glyn Milburn (196 yards and 1 TD). Milburn also led Stanford receiving with 9 receptions for 66 yards and had 117 return yards: His 379 all-purpose yards set a Pac-10 record at the time and remained Stanford's record until it was eclipsed by Christian McCaffrey's 389 all-purpose yards in the 2015 edition of the Big Game.

=== 2000 ===
Stanford's Casey Moore caught the winning touchdown on the final play of the first-ever Big Game to go into overtime.

=== 2004 ===
#4 California beat Stanford 41-6 for their largest Big Game victory since 1930, and it was Cal head coach Jeff Tedford's third win in a row over the Cardinal (he would end up winning five straight Big Games against Stanford, the most of any Cal coach since Andy Smith). The Bears featured QB Aaron Rodgers but also had a lethal RB combo in J.J. Arrington (169 yards) and freshman Marshawn Lynch, who ran for 122 yards on just nine carries, including a 55 yard TD where he broke through multiple tacklers in a style the fans called "Beast Mode".

=== 2009 ===
#19 Cal's Michael Mohamed intercepted an Andrew Luck pass at the Cal 3-yard line with 1:36 left to preserve a Bears win over #14 Stanford, 34–28. It was also a rare Big Game where both teams were nationally ranked.

=== 2010 ===
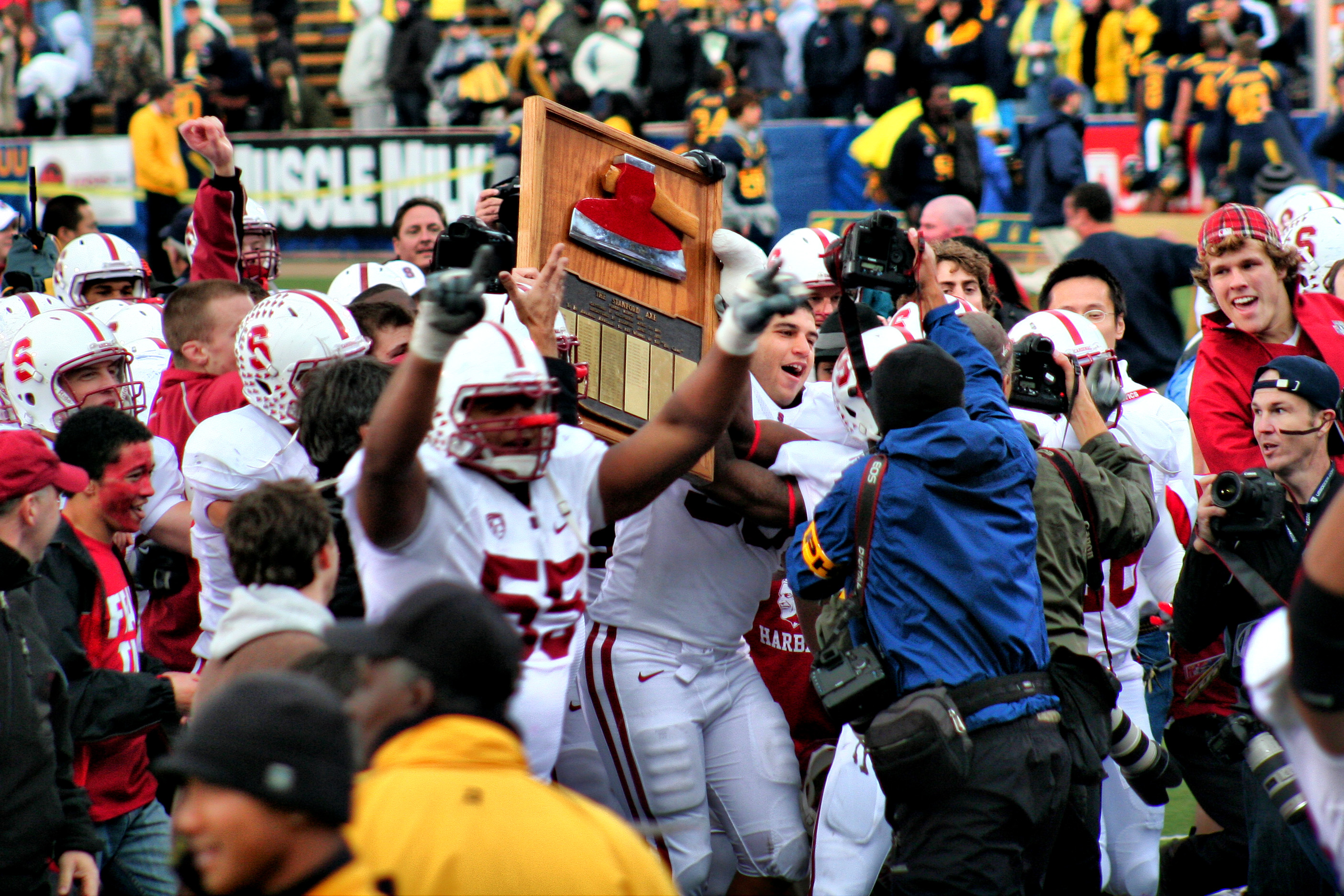
Stanford players lift the Stanford Axe after winning the 2010 Big Game

Sixth-ranked Stanford, in a 48–14 victory, ties Cal's 1975 record for most points scored in a Big Game.

=== 2013 ===
Winning 63–13, #10 Stanford set the record for most points scored in a Big Game, shattering the previous record of 48 shared by Cal in 1975 and Stanford in 2010. The 50-point victory margin also set a Big Game record, breaking the previous record that had stood for 83 years when Stanford beat Cal 41–0 in 1930. The 76 total points scored by both teams broke the record of 66 set in 2000. With the victory, Stanford clinched the Pac-12 North Division Championship while Cal ended its season at 1–11, the most losses in one season in Cal football history.

=== 2018 ===
The 2018 Big Game was originally scheduled to be played on November 17, but was rescheduled to December 1 at 12:00 noon, because of unhealthy air quality in the Bay Area caused by the Camp Fire. Stanford continued its streak, winning for the ninth time in a row, beating Cal 23–13.

=== 2019 ===
Down 20–17 with 2:23 remaining, the Cal offense engineered a six-play, 75-yard drive culminating in a 16-yard touchdown run from quarterback Chase Garbers to give the Bears their first lead of the game. Cal linebacker Evan Weaver sealed the 24–20 victory for the Bears with a dramatic fourth-and-one stop on Cardinal running back Cameron Scarlett on the subsequent possession, setting off a raucous celebration on Stanford's home turf as the Axe returned to Berkeley after nearly a decade away.

=== 2020 ===
In the COVID-19 pandemic-shortened 2020 season, both Cal and Stanford entered the game with 0–2 records on the season, with each team previously having a game cancelled due to COVID infections. Cal opened scrimmage with a dominant 8 play, 75-yard touchdown drive. However, three punts each by both teams, a muffed punt recovered by Stanford at Cal's 16 (resulting in a touchdown), and a last-second blocked field goal attempt by Cal from the Stanford 32 as time expired left the game tied at 10–10 to enter halftime. A third-quarter fumble at Cal's 41 provided Stanford with good scoring position, leading to a touchdown three plays later and giving Stanford their first lead of the game, 17–10. Trailing 24–17 with 4:28 left in the fourth, Cal completed a 14 play, 90-yard drive starting from their own 10 yard-line to score a touchdown with 58 seconds remaining in regulation. Now trailing by just one point with the score at 24–23, Cal coach Justin Wilcox signaled for a 2-pt PAT, which was blocked by Stanford's Thomas Booker, in a play forever immortalized by Stanford Axe Committee members as "The Block." Cal attempted an unsuccessful onside kick, and Stanford recovered the Axe four plays and 11 yards later, taking it back to the Farm for the 10th time in 11 seasons.

=== 2024 ===
Cal and Stanford met in Berkeley in their first Big Game as members of the Atlantic Coast Conference. Stanford came out strong with two first quarter touchdowns by Justin Lamson to build a 14-point lead. Trailing 21–7 towards the end of the third quarter, Cal scored 17 unanswered points to rally back to a 24–21 win. Following a field goal by Ryan Coe, Fernando Mendoza found receiver Jonathan Brady for a 30-yard touchdown to cut the lead to 21–16. A Stanford punt pushed the Golden Bears back to their own 2-yard line, requiring them to drive 98 yards to take the lead. Mendoza connected with Nyziah Hunter for a 36-yard gain, found tight end Jack Endries on a pivotal fourth-down conversion and later, on third-and-11, he found Jonathan Brady again for a 22-yard score and a 2-point conversion by Jaydn Ott pushed the lead to 3 with 2:40 to play. The drive is referred to by Cal fans as “98 Yards With My Boys” because of Mendoza's emotional postgame interview. Cal's defense forced a sack on quarterback Ashton Daniels and turnover on downs on the Cardinal's following possession, and the Bears retained possession of the Stanford Axe for the fourth consecutive season, a feat which has only been accomplished 4 times.

== Game results ==
California victories	Stanford victories	Ties

No.	Date	Location	Winner	Score
1	March 19, 1892	San Francisco	Stanford	14–10
2	December 17, 1892	San Francisco	Tie	10–10
3	November 30, 1893	San Francisco	Tie	6–6
4	November 29, 1894	San Francisco	Stanford	6–0
5	November 29, 1895	San Francisco	Tie	6–6
6	November 26, 1896	San Francisco	Stanford	20–0
7	November 25, 1897	San Francisco	Stanford	28–0
8	November 24, 1898	San Francisco	California	22–0
9	November 30, 1899	San Francisco	California	30–0
10	November 29, 1900	San Francisco	Stanford	5–0
11	November 9, 1901	San Francisco	California	2–0
12	November 8, 1902	San Francisco	California	16–0
13	November 14, 1903	San Francisco	Tie	6–6
14	November 12, 1904	Berkeley	Stanford	18–0
15	November 11, 1905	Stanford	Stanford	12–5
16	November 10, 1906^{1}	Berkeley	Stanford	6–3
17	November 9, 1907^{1}	Stanford	Stanford	21–11
18	November 14, 1908^{1}	Berkeley	Stanford	12–3
19	November 13, 1909^{1}	Stanford	California	19–13
20	November 12, 1910^{1}	Berkeley	California	25–6
21	November 11, 1911^{1}	Stanford	California	21–3
22	November 11, 1912^{1}	Berkeley	Tie	3–3
23	November 8, 1913^{1}	Stanford	Stanford	13–8
24	November 14, 1914^{1}	Berkeley	Stanford	26–8
25	November 22, 1919	Stanford	California	14–10
26	November 20, 1920	Berkeley	California	38–0
27	November 19, 1921	Stanford	California	42–7
28	November 25, 1922	Stanford	California	28–0
29	November 24, 1923	Berkeley	California	9–0
30	November 22, 1924	Berkeley	Tie	20–20
31	November 21, 1925	Stanford	Stanford	27–14
32	November 20, 1926	Berkeley	Stanford	41–6
33	November 19, 1927	Stanford	Stanford	13–6
34	November 24, 1928	Berkeley	Tie	13–13
35	November 23, 1929	Stanford	Stanford	21–6
36	November 22, 1930	Berkeley	Stanford	41–0
37	November 21, 1931	Stanford	California	6–0
38	November 19, 1932	Berkeley	Tie	0–0
39	November 25, 1933	Stanford	Stanford	7–3
40	November 24, 1934	Berkeley	Stanford	9–7
41	November 23, 1935	Stanford	Stanford	13–0
42	November 21, 1936	Berkeley	California	20–0
43	November 20, 1937	Stanford	#2 California	13–0
44	November 19, 1938	Berkeley	#9 California	6–0

No.	Date	Location	Winner	Score
45	November 25, 1939	Stanford	California	32–14
46	November 30, 1940	Berkeley	#3 Stanford	13–7
47	November 29, 1941	Stanford	California	16–0
48	November 21, 1942	Berkeley	Stanford	26–7
49	November 23, 1946^{3}	Berkeley	Stanford	25–6
50	November 22, 1947	Stanford	#9 California	21–18
51	November 20, 1948	Berkeley	#4 California	7–6
52	November 19, 1949	Stanford	#3 California	33–14
53	November 25, 1950	Berkeley	Tie	7–7
54	November 24, 1951	Stanford	#19 California	20–7
55	November 22, 1952	Berkeley	California	26–0
56	November 21, 1953	Stanford	Tie	21–21
57	November 20, 1954	Berkeley	California	28–20
58	November 19, 1955	Stanford	#18 Stanford	19–0
59	November 24, 1956	Berkeley	California	20–18
60	November 23, 1957	Stanford	Stanford	14–12
61	November 22, 1958	Berkeley	California	16–15
62	November 21, 1959	Stanford	#19 California	20–17
63	November 19, 1960	Berkeley	California	21–10
64	November 25, 1961	Stanford	Stanford	20–7
65	November 24, 1962	Berkeley	Stanford	30–13
66	November 30, 1963	Stanford	Stanford	28–17
67	November 21, 1964	Berkeley	Stanford	21–3
68	November 20, 1965	Stanford	Stanford	9–7
69	November 19, 1966	Berkeley	Stanford	13–7
70	November 18, 1967	Stanford	California	26–3
71	November 23, 1968	Berkeley	Stanford	20–0
72	November 22, 1969	Stanford	#14 Stanford	29–28
73	November 21, 1970	Berkeley	California	22–14
74	November 20, 1971	Stanford	#18 Stanford	14–0
75	November 18, 1972	Berkeley	California	24–21
76	November 24, 1973	Stanford	Stanford	26–17
77	November 23, 1974	Berkeley	Stanford	22–20
78	November 22, 1975	Stanford	#13 California	48–15
79	November 20, 1976	Berkeley	Stanford	27–24
80	November 19, 1977	Stanford	Stanford	21–3
81	November 18, 1978	Berkeley	Stanford	30–10
82	November 17, 1979	Stanford	California	21–14
83	November 22, 1980	Berkeley	California	28–23
84	November 21, 1981	Stanford	Stanford	42–21
85	November 20, 1982	Berkeley	California	25–20
86	November 19, 1983	Stanford	California	27–18
87	November 17, 1984	Berkeley	Stanford	27–10
88	November 23, 1985	Stanford	Stanford	24–22

No.	Date	Location	Winner	Score
89	November 22, 1986	Berkeley	California	17–11
90	November 21, 1987	Stanford	Stanford	31–7
91	November 19, 1988	Berkeley	Tie	19–19
92	November 18, 1989	Stanford	Stanford	24–17
93	November 17, 1990	Berkeley	Stanford	27–25
94	November 23, 1991	Stanford	#21 Stanford	38–21
95	November 21, 1992	Berkeley	#14 Stanford	41–21
96	November 20, 1993	Stanford	California	46–17
97	November 19, 1994	Berkeley	California	24–23
98	November 18, 1995	Stanford	Stanford	29–24
99	November 23, 1996	Berkeley	Stanford	42–21
100	November 22, 1997	Stanford	Stanford	21–20
101	November 21, 1998	Berkeley	Stanford	10–3
102	November 20, 1999	Stanford	Stanford	31–13
103	November 18, 2000	Berkeley	Stanford	36–30^{OT}
104	November 17, 2001	Stanford	#13 Stanford	35–28
105	November 23, 2002	Berkeley	California	30–7
106	November 22, 2003	Stanford	California	28–16
107	November 20, 2004	Berkeley	#4 California	41–6
108	November 19, 2005	Stanford	California	27–3
109	December 2, 2006	Berkeley	#21 California	26–17
110	December 1, 2007	Stanford	Stanford	20–13
111	November 22, 2008	Berkeley	California	37–16
112	November 21, 2009	Stanford	California	34–28
113	November 20, 2010	Berkeley	#7 Stanford	48–14
114	November 19, 2011	Stanford	#8 Stanford	31–28
115	October 20, 2012	Berkeley	#22 Stanford	21–3
116	November 23, 2013	Stanford	#10 Stanford	63–13
117	November 22, 2014	Berkeley	Stanford	38–17
118	November 21, 2015	Stanford	#15 Stanford	35–22
119	November 19, 2016	Berkeley	Stanford	45–31
120	November 18, 2017	Stanford	#22 Stanford	17–14
121	December 1, 2018	Berkeley	Stanford	23–13
122	November 23, 2019	Stanford	California	24–20
123	November 27, 2020	Berkeley	Stanford	24–23
124	November 20, 2021	Stanford	California	41–11
125	November 19, 2022	Berkeley	California	27–20
126	November 18, 2023	Stanford	California	27–15
127	November 23, 2024	Berkeley	California	24–21
128	November 22, 2025	Stanford	Stanford	31–10
129	November 21, 2026	Berkeley	Stanford	44–28
Series: Stanford leads 67–51–11

- ^{1} = Rugby football game.
- ^{2} = As California resumed football in 1915, Santa Clara was Stanford's rival during that period.
- ^{3} = No games played from 1943 through 1945 as Stanford shut down its football program due to World War II.

== Rivalry in other sports ==
In other sports, matchups between Cal and Stanford feature their own nicknames based on the word "big." Examples include:

- Men's and women's soccer – The "Big Clasico".
- Men's and women's rowing – The "Big Row" now in honor of Cal coxswain Jill Costello who died of stage 4 lung cancer in 2010. The men's rowing teams have held more than 95 duel races since 1902.
- Men's and women's track and field – The "Big Meet"
- Volleyball – The "Big Spike"
- Men's basketball – The "Big Dunk"
- Softball – The "Big Swing"
- Water polo – The "Big Splash"
- Ice hockey – The "Big Freeze"
- Sailing – The “Big Sail”, held at St. Francis Yacht Club in San Francisco
- Quadball – The "Big Sweep"
- Tennis – The "Big Slam"
- Squash – The "Big Squash"
- Hackathon – The "Big Hack" (discontinued)

In rugby, the two schools have a trophy of their own called the "Scrum Axe". In men's basketball the semiannual matchups are sometimes labeled the "Big Game" but it is not official. In women's basketball, the meetings are simply called the "Battle of the Bay."

== See also ==
- List of NCAA college football rivalry games
- List of most-played college football series in NCAA Division I
- Stanford Axe
- 1906–17 Stanford rugby teams
- California Golden Bears rugby
- Kings–Warriors rivalry
- Bay Bridge Series
