= List of University of Illinois songs =

This is a list of songs written about, dedicated to, or commonly associated with the University of Illinois Urbana-Champaign. Most of the songs have been composed before 1940, and many were originally submitted in campus songwriting contests.

== Presently popular ==
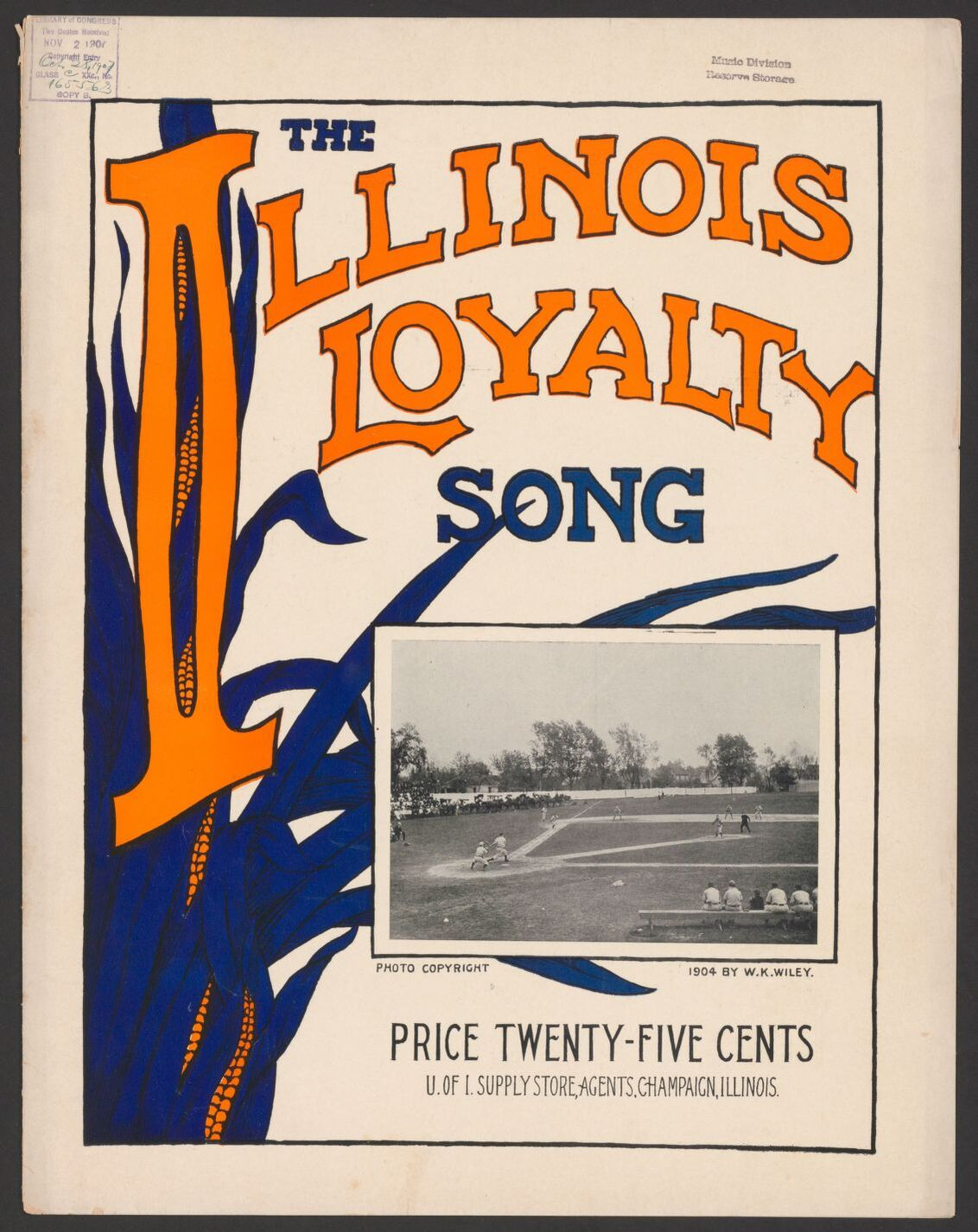
Front cover of "The Illinois Loyalty Song"

The following songs still see regular performance at the university, specifically through the Marching Illini. Other organizations, such as the Varsity Men's Glee Club, will also perform these songs. They are strongly recognized as university songs.

Title	Composer	Lyricist	Written	Ref.
Cheer Illini	Harold Vater Hill '11 (Note: The applicable years of graduation from the University of Illinois are listed after a person's name.)	Howard Ruggles Green '12	1910	
Hail to the Orange	Harold Vater Hill '11	Howard Ruggles Green '12	1910	
Illini Fantasy	James Curnow	—N/a	1970	
"Illinois (state song)" (Note: While "Illinois" is about the State of Illinois, rather than the University of Illinois, it is commonly associated with both.)	Charles H. Chamberlain	Archibald Johnston	1870–93	
Illinois Loyalty	Thacher Howland Guild		1905–06	
Illinois March	Edwin Franko Goldman	Guy Maxwell Duker	1953	
March of the Illini	Harold LaForrest Alford	—N/a	1928	
Oskee Wow-Wow	Harold Vater Hill '11	Howard Ruggles Green '12	1910	
Pride of the Illini	Karl Lawrence King	Raymond Francis Dvorak '22 '26	1928	

== Performed in the past ==
The following songs used to see regular performance through the university band or orchestra, campus glee clubs, or other means. As of recent history, they are no longer performed regularly.

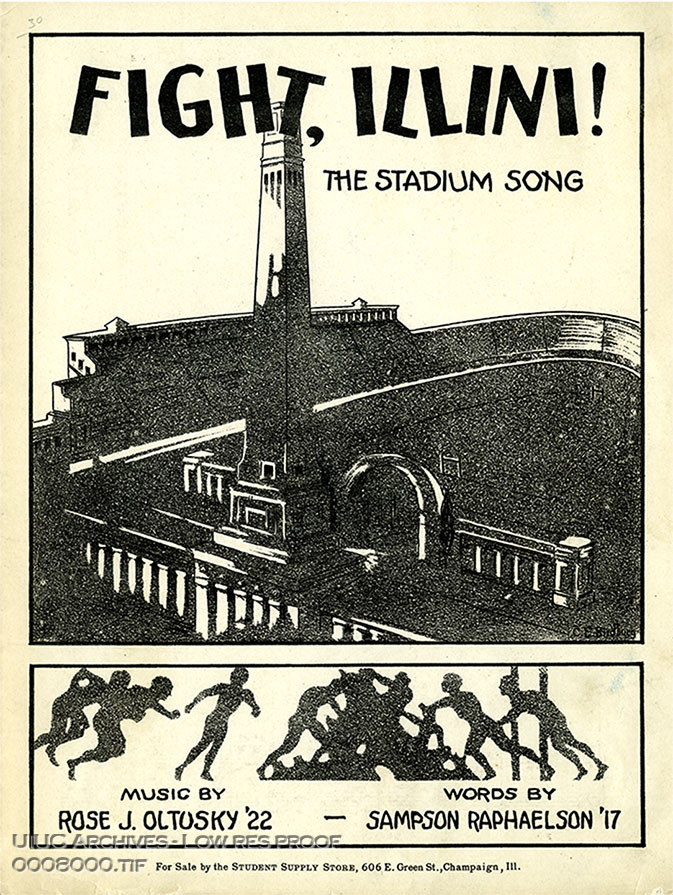
Front cover of "Fight Illini"

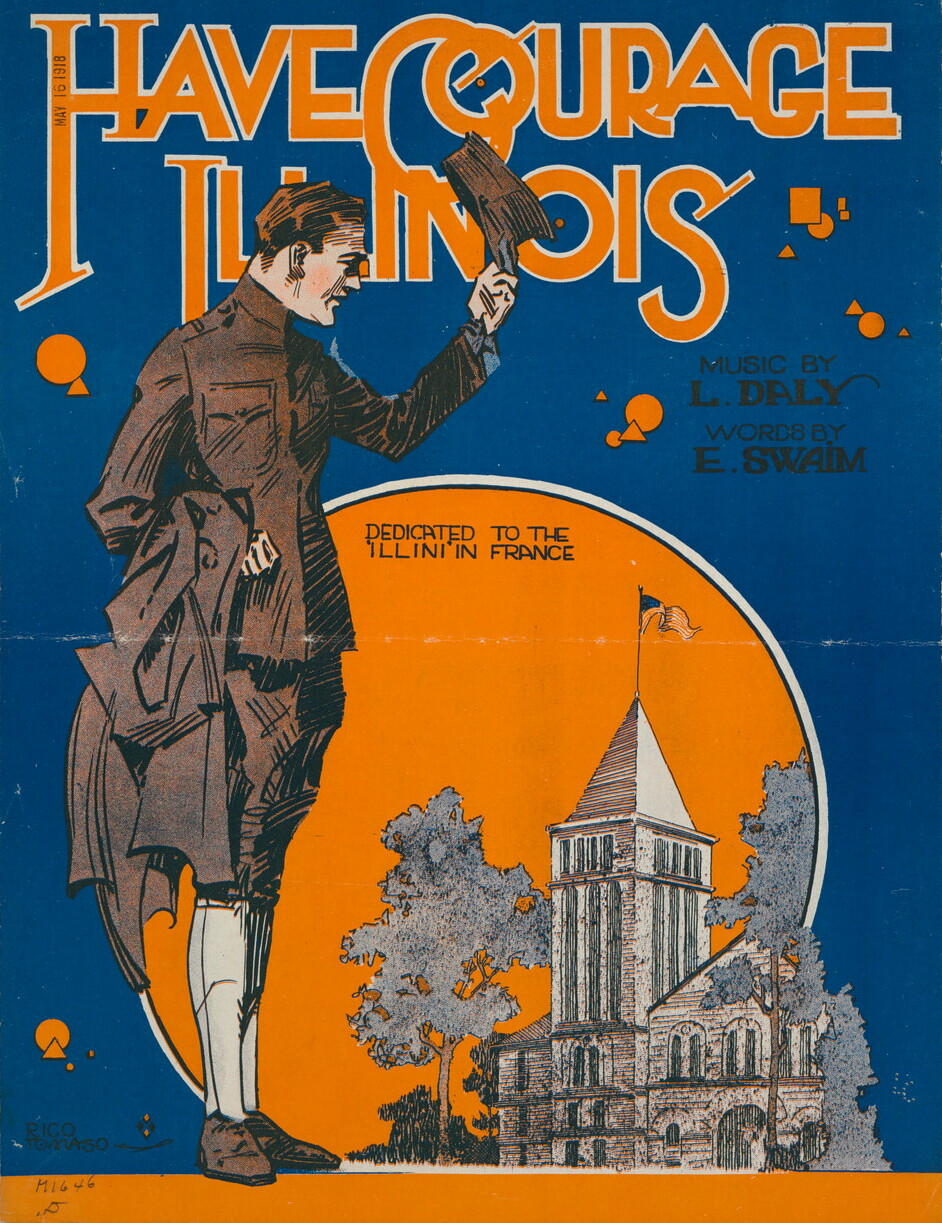
Front cover of "Have Courage, Illinois"

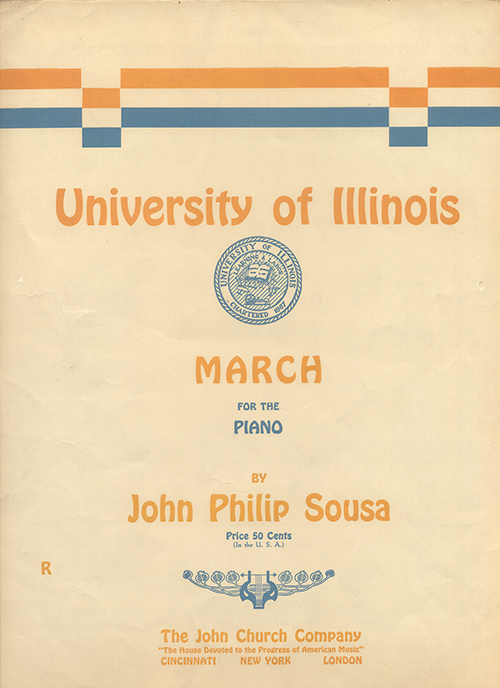
Front cover of "University of Illinois March."

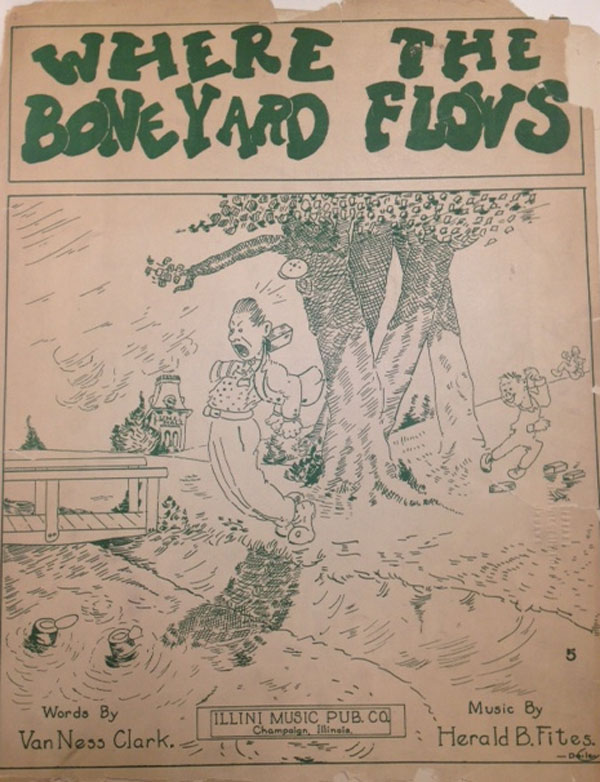
Front cover of "Where the Boneyard Flows"

Title	Composer	Lyricist	Written	Ref.
Academic Professional	Lloyd Morey '11		1955	
Alma mater	Arthur Everett Holch Sr. '13	Ralph Edgar Holch '10	1912	
Back Illinois	Vernon Thompson Stevens '15 '17		1914	
Come, All Ye Loyal Rooters! (Illinois Field Song)	Edward George Oldefest '06		1907	
Fight Illini (The Stadium Song)	Rose Josephine Oltusky Edelson '22	Sampson Miles Raphaelson '17	1921	
For Good Old Illinois	Vernon Thompson Stevens '15 '17		1914	
Grand Illinois	Frederick Locke Lawrence	Samuel Alexander Bullard '78	1903	
Hail Illinois!	Richard Eugene Kent '21	Edmund DeForest Swanberg '18	1917–18	
Have Courage, Illinois	Lewis Daly '20	Earl Francis Swaim ex-'18	1917–18	
Illini Fight Song	Floyd John Hirth '30		1938	
Illini Overture	John Stanley Crandell		1933	
Illinois	Albert Emmett Marien '33		1962	
Illinois Battle Call	Ruth Kelso '08		1907	
Illinois Celebration Song	Thacher Howland Guild		1909	
Illinois Forever	Vernon Thompson Stevens '15 '17		1914	
Illinois Holabaloo	Rosa Lee Gaut '12		1915–16	
"Illinois Pep."	Allen Edwin Stearn '17 '19		1914–17	
Illinois Seniors' Greeting	Adelle Elizabeth McClure '18		1918	
Illinois Sunset Song	Francis Keese Wynkoop Drury '05, Otto William Schreiber '10	Stephen Sheldon Colvin	1910	
Illinois We Love You	Vernon Thompson Stevens '15 '17		1916	
Illinois, We're All Behind You	Allen Edwin Stearn '17 '19		1917–18	
It's the System (That They Have at Illinois)	Lewis Daly '20, Vernon Thompson Stevens '15 '17	Vernon Thompson Stevens '15 '17	1917	
Let's Go Illinois	Vernon Thompson Stevens '15 '17	Arthur Leo Little ex-'14	1912	
Lights Out March	Earl Ellison McCoy ex-'08	—N/a	1902	
Loyal Sons of Illinois (The Homecoming Song)	William Dale Donahue '23	George Victor Buchanan, Jr. '22	1921	
O Illinois	John Stanley Crandell		1928	
On Forever, Illinois	John Lawrence Erb	William Chauncy Langdon	1917	
Our University	Mary Elizabeth Mann '09		1907	
Siren Song	Thacher Howland Guild		1908	
Song of Illinois	A. Leffingwell	William Abbott Oldfather	1924	
Song of the Illini Braves	John Stanley Crandell		1929	
Sons of Loyalty	Ralph Armond Carlsen '20	Walter Elliott Hayne '18, Harold J. Orr ex-'20 ex-'22	1917–18	
Take Me Back to Illinois	Herald Bratt Fites '17	John Eugene Davis '18	1917–18	
That's the Way at Illinois	Lucia Alzina Stevens '03		1900–03	
Those Good Old Songs They Sing at Illinois	Vernon Thompson Stevens '15 '17		1914	
A Toast to the Orange and Blue	Daniel Homer Rich '07		1903–07	
University of Illinois March	John Philip Sousa	—N/a	1929	
Where the Boneyard Flows	Herald Bratt Fites '17	Cyrus Van Ness Clark ex-'18	1915	
Wide Stand Our Gates	Richard Eugene Kent '21	Theodore Preston Bourland '23	1921	

== See also ==
- Fight song
- Alma mater (song)
