= The Big Sail =

College sailing rivalry between UC Berkeley and Stanford

- UC Berkeley Club Sailing Team Stanford Cardinal
- Sport: Collegiate Sailing
- First meeting: November 2004, 21 years ago
- Latest meeting: November 19, 2025; Stanford, 8-4
- Next meeting: November 18, 2026
- Stadiums: St. Francis Yacht Club

Statistics
- Total meetings: 21
- Current win streak: Stanford, 5 (2021–present)

The Big Sail is the name given to the annual exhibition sailing contest between the University of California, Berkeley Club Sailing Team and the Stanford Cardinal Sailing Team. The regatta is held annually on the Tuesday or Wednesday preceding The Big Game, at the St. Francis Yacht Club in San Francisco, California.

As of 2025, the regatta consists of five divisions per school, each with its own boat: Varsity (current undergraduate sailors), Alumni, Masters (40+ years old), Grandmasters (60+ years old), and Women's. The boats used are matched J/22 keelboats supplied by St. Francis Yacht Club. The racing consists of two-versus-two team racing, with the team pairings rotating through the five divisions.

== History ==
The event in its current form was conceived in 2004 by StFYC members Jaren Leet, Jim Mullen, and Ron Young. Mullen and Leet were alumni of California and Stanford and sought to revive the sporadically-raced event, most recently hosted by the Berkeley Yacht Club. Young was chair of the StFYC's yachting luncheon series, which chose to stage a spectator-friendly, arena-style regatta with school marching bands, cheerleaders, mascots, and alumni - filling the clubhouse with the jubilation of a college football game. The 2004 regatta was sailed in J/105 one-design keelboats match racing in three divisions: Varsity (current students), Young Alumni (under 40 years old), and Older Alumni (40 and over year of age). California won the Varsity and Young Alumni divisions, with Stanford winning the Older Alumni.

In 2013, the decision was made to switch to one-design J/22 keelboats, provided by StFYC. This allowed for the addition of more divisions, including the Grandmaster's and, later, the Women's divisions. The first all-women Big Sail boat competed in and won the Master's division in 2014. In 2018 the Women's division was introduced, bringing the total to five J/22s racing for each team.

The Big Sail was not held in 2020 due to the COVID-19 pandemic. The event returned in 2021, and Stanford won. Until 2022, the regatta was held on the Tuesday preceding The Big Game. From 2022 onward, it became the Wednesday of the week preceding The Big Game.

In 2023 the format was changed from match racing to two-versus-two team racing. 2023 saw the first blowout at a Big Sail, with Stanford winning every single race. In 2024, Stanford won 8-2, losing only to the California Young Alumni and Masters.

== See also ==
- Big Game (American football)
- Stanford Axe
- Varsity Blues scandal
