= Illinois Loyalty =

University of Illinois school song

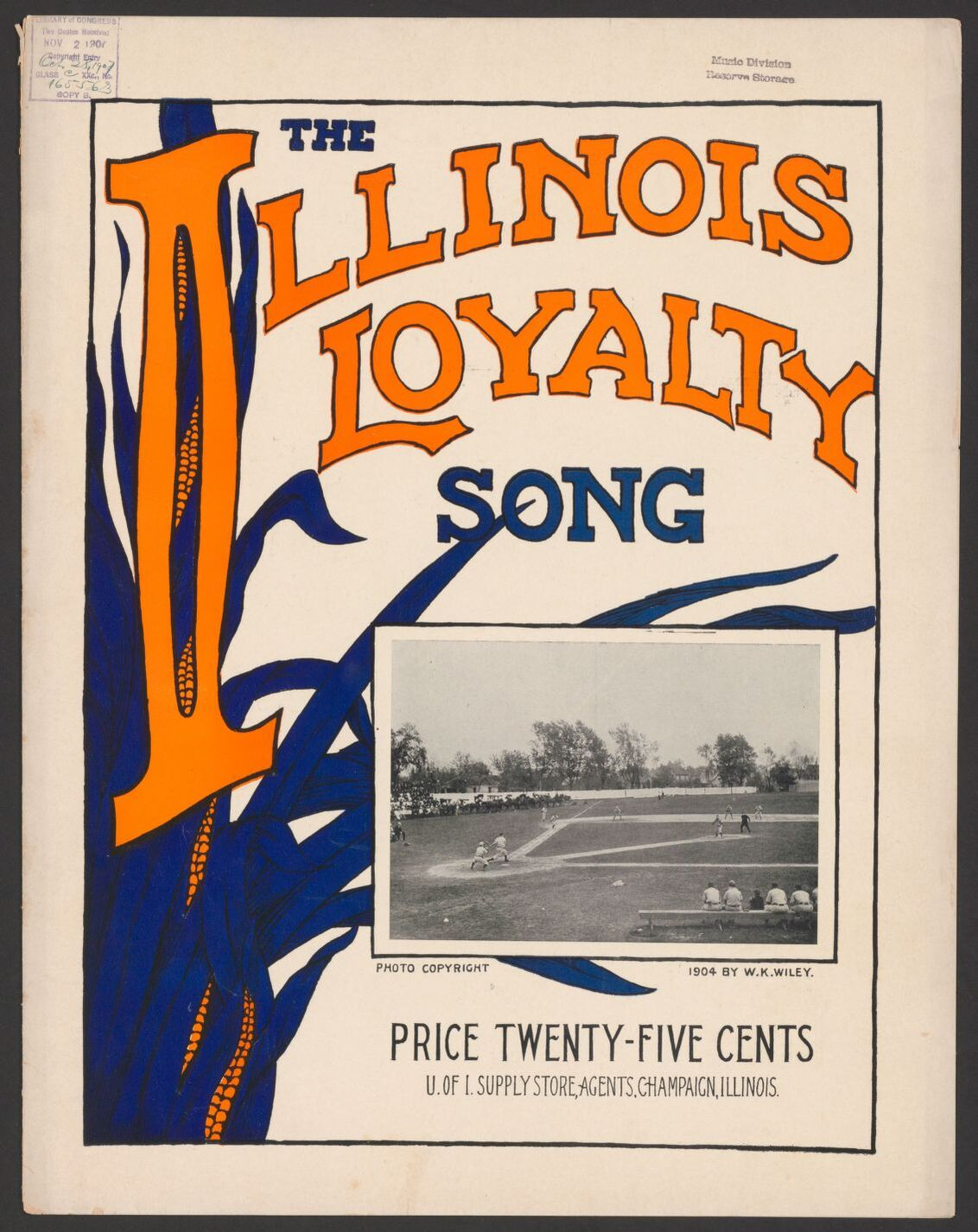
- The title page of the original publication of "The Illinois Loyalty Song."
- Alma mater of the University of Illinois
- Also known as: The Illinois Loyalty Song; Loyalty; We're Loyal to You, Illinois
- Lyrics: Thacher Howland Guild, 1904–06
- Music: Thacher Howland Guild, 1904–06
- Published: 1907

"Illinois Loyalty", also known as "We're Loyal to You, Illinois" or just "Loyalty", is a song associated with the University of Illinois Urbana-Champaign. It (along with "Hail to the Orange") is the school's alma mater. It is also used (although not as often as Oskee Wow-Wow) as the school's fight song.

== History ==
Thacher Howland Guild came to the University of Illinois from Brown University in September 1904 as an instructor of rhetoric. He brought an unfinished song that he intended to be used at a college. Guild spent his next year at the university working on the first part of what would become "The Illinois Loyalty Song" and also joined the Marching Illini in the cornet section, where he met Albert Austin Harding, a student recently promoted to director of bands. In the early months of 1906, Guild added the cheering interlude and second part of the song. Harding arranged Guild's song for the Marching Illini just in time for its anniversary concert on March 3, 1906. It was first published in 1907 by the U. of I. Supply Store under the name "The Illinois Loyalty Song." Since then, the song has been used nearly universally as a song to evoke school spirit and represent the University of Illinois.

One of the driving forces of purchasing a chime for the university was the desire to hear "Illinois Loyalty" ring out on the instrument. After funding for a thirteen-bell chime had been secured in the middle of 1920, Dean Thomas Arkle Clark asked the purchasing committee if it could play the melody of "Illinois Loyalty". As it turned out, this would require an additional two bells, and he blocked the purchase until an additional $2,500 was raised. In short, the Altgeld Chimes were configured specifically to play the melody of "Illinois Loyalty".

In the early 1930s, the status of "Illinois Loyalty" as a school song became a point of controversy. Students debated whether fans in the football stadium should stand up during "Hail to the Orange." Others argued that students should only stand when "Illinois Loyalty" is played, which they claimed is the official alma mater song. These arguments continued with no conclusion until November 1958, when the Men's Independent Association and the Interfraternity Council urged university president David Dodds Henry to replace "Illinois Loyalty" with "Hail to the Orange" as the official alma mater song. It was discovered from this letter that "Illinois Loyalty" was never officially recognized by the university, but rather "For Good Old Illinois" by Vernon Thompson Stevens was recognized in 1916. President Henry believed that legislation of the issue could only occur when all interested groups have engaged in widespread discussion and come to an agreement. In February 1959, he asked the Alumni Board of the Alumni Association and the university's Student Senate to begin the discussion. By March, President Henry announced that the university would not be making any decisions regarding official school songs. "Illinois Loyalty" and "Hail to the Orange" would remain in competition with "For Good Old Illinois" for the title of "official alma mater song".

Due to the song's length (over a minute long), it is normally played only at the beginning, halftime, and end of a football game. However, it is not considered rousing enough for a large crowd at a game. For that reason, "Oskee Wow-Wow," written in 1910, is used as the school's fight song.

== Lyrics ==
The song's words as listed in the 1906 program are shown below. The original publication includes optional replacements for sections of the lyrics, such as replacing "Victory" with "Touchdown", or "crack out that ball" with "smash that blockade"; however, they are not shown here.

We're loyal to you, Illinois,
We're Orange and Blue, Illinois;
We'll back you to stand
'Gainst the best in the land,
For we know you have sand, Illinois,
Rah! Rah!
So crack out that ball, Illinois,
We're backing you all, Illinois,
Our team is our fame−protector,
On! boys, for we expect a
Victory from you, Illinois.

Che-he, Che−ha, Che−ha−ha−ha! Che−he, Che−ha, Che−ha−ha−ha!
Illinois! Illinois! Illinois!

Fling out that dear old flag of Orange and Blue
Lead on your sons and daughters, fighting for you,
Like men of old, on giants placing reliance, shouting defiance-
Oskee wow−wow!
Amid the broad green fields that nourish our land,
For honest Labor and for Learning we stand,
And unto thee we pledge our heart and hand,
Dear Alma Mater, Illinois.

== Media ==
The Marching Illini plays "Illinois Loyalty" at the beginning, middle (after field goals and extra points), and end of football games, as well as other games the band attends.

The music is included in the "Illini Fantasy", a medley of Illinois songs and marches arranged for concert band by James Curnow in 1970 as a commission from Director of Bands Harry Begian.

The University Summer Band plays "Illinois Loyalty" at the close of its Twilight Concerts on the Quadrangle in June and July.

The song is frequently performed during chime concerts on the Altgeld Chimes.

"Illinois Loyalty" is used as the school song of several schools within Illinois and several other (primarily Midwestern) states.

== See also ==
- List of University of Illinois songs
