= All Hail Blue and Gold =

UC Berkeley alma mater

All Hail Blue and Gold is the official campus alma mater for the University of California, Berkeley. It was composed in 1905 by Harold Bingham who also wrote the California Indian Song and a number of other Cal songs. The song rapidly became more popular as a number of a cappella groups on campus performed the song and the Cal Band began to play it at the conclusion of all university events and athletic contests. The song is also played by Cal Band at the end of home football games played in California Memorial Stadium before the band marches out of the stadium.

== Lyrics ==
All Hail Blue and Gold

All Hail, Blue and Gold
Thy colors unfold
O'er loyal Californians,
Whose hearts are strong and bold,
All Hail, Blue and Gold
Thy strength ne'er shall fail;
For thee we'll die,
All Hail! All Hail!

All Hail, Blue and Gold
To thee we shall cling;
O'er golden fields of poppies,
Thy praises we shall sing.
All Hail, Blue and Gold
On breezes ye sail;
Thy sight we love,
All Hail! All Hail!

== External sources ==
- Cal Band Song Page
