= McFarland Memorial Bell Tower =

McFarland Carillon
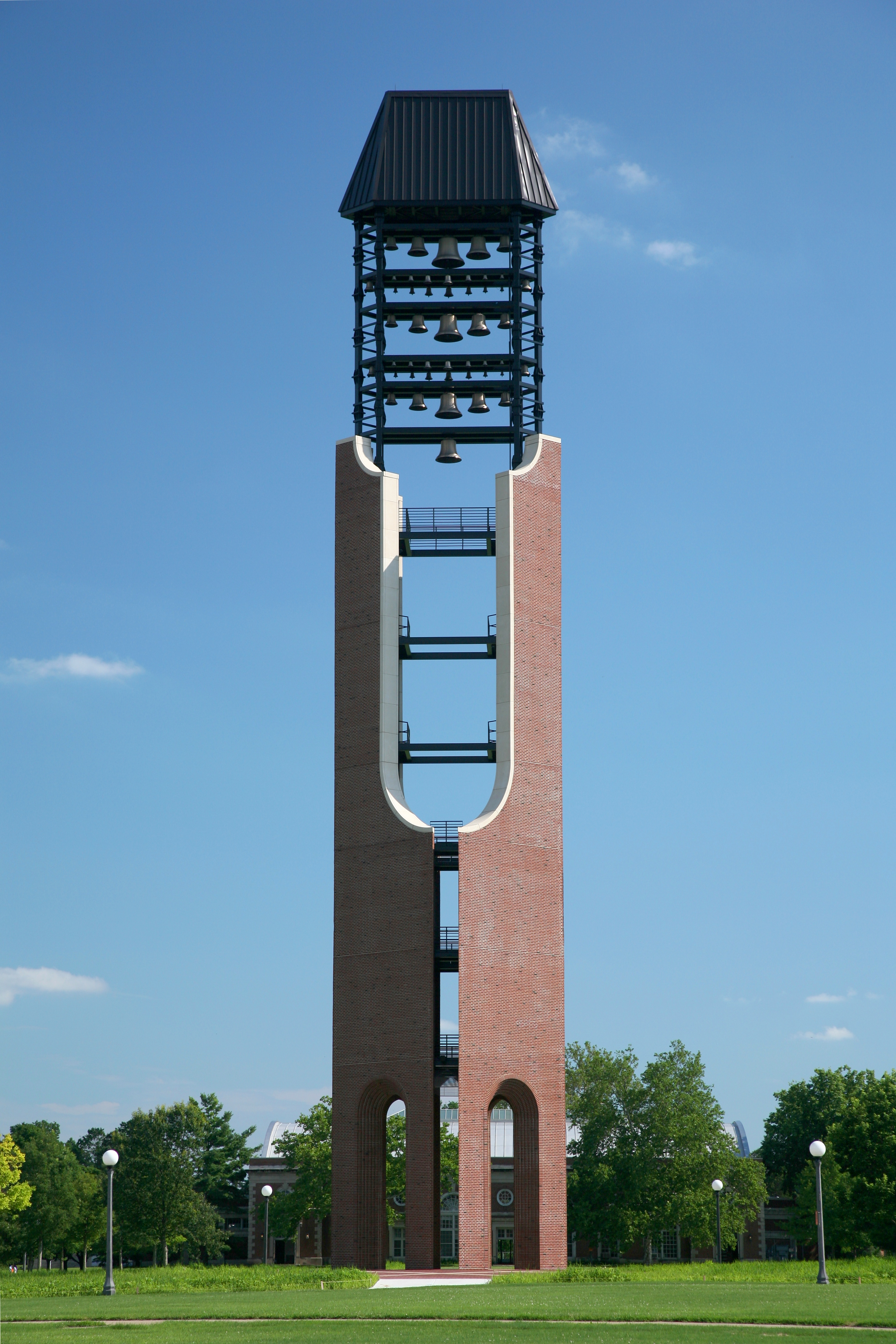
- Alternative names: McFarland Bell Tower; McFarland Memorial Bell Tower

General information
- Type: Bell tower housing a carillon
- Location: South Quad, Urbana, Illinois, United States
- Inaugurated: October 22, 2010
- Cost: $550,000 (bells)
- Owner: University of Illinois Urbana-Champaign

Height
- Height: 185 feet (56 m)

Design and construction
- Architect: Fred Guyton
- Architecture firm: Peckham Guyton Albers & Viets, Inc.
- Other designers: Petit & Fritsen (bellfounding)

The McFarland Memorial Bell Tower is a 185-foot (56 m) bell tower located on the South Quad of the University of Illinois Urbana-Champaign. The tower was approved by the University's trustees in 2005 and built in 2008-2009. It was designed by Fred Guyton of Peckham, Guyton, Albers & Viets. The carillon has 48 bells.

== History and description ==
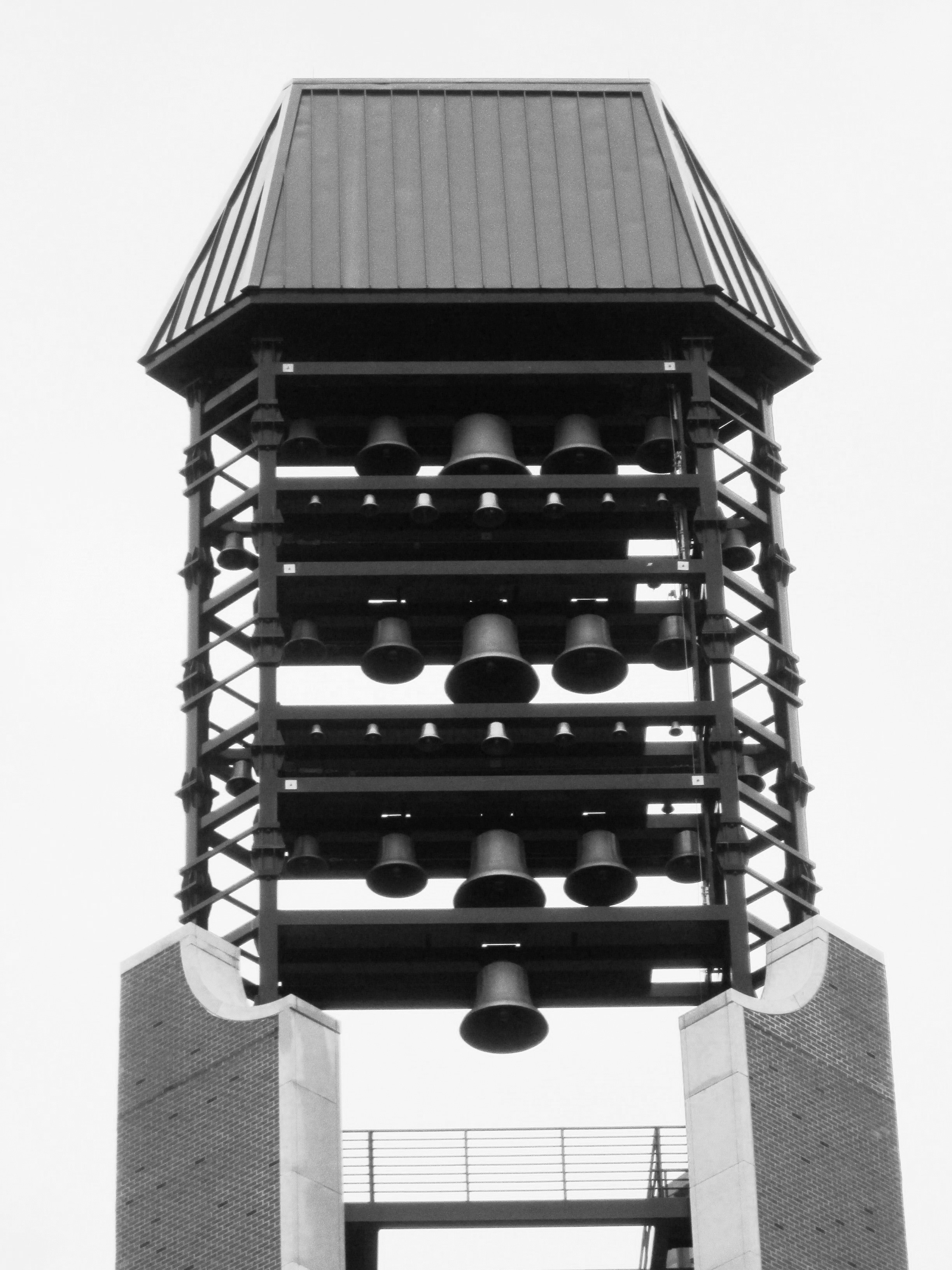
Close-up of the bells, September 20, 2013

The carillon project began as an attempt to upgrade and renovate the Altgeld Chimes of Altgeld Hall Tower, until it became clear that this would not be possible. A free-standing campanile had been considered as a possibility for the campus since 1913. The funding for the project came from Harold Richard "Dick" McFarland, a graduate from the university's College of Agriculture in 1952. After the death of his wife Sarah "Sally" McFarland due to ovarian cancer, McFarland donated $1.5 million for the construction of the tower, which would be named in her honor.

The carillon's 48 bells were cast by the Petit & Fritsen bell foundry and were transported to the United States via boat. The total cost of the bells was estimated at $550,000.

Local residents and students have attempted to climb the tower, and at least one has fallen while attempting the climb.

== "Eye of Sauron" prank ==
In the early hours of Sunday, September 21, 2008, students hung a replica of the "Eye of Sauron" in the top half of the tower. The eye is from J. R. R. Tolkien's novel The Lord of the Rings and is a symbol of the principal antagonist. The University of Illinois Police did not identify the pranksters. The eye was removed from the tower the next morning.

== See also ==
- Shafer Tower – Bell tower in Muncie, Indiana, US
- Moser Tower and Millennium Carillon – Bell tower and carillon in Naperville, Illinois, US
- Cook Carillon Tower – Bell instrument in Allendale, Michigan, US
- Century Tower (University of Florida) – Bell tower in Florida, United States
