= Oskee Wow-Wow =

1910 fight song of the University of Illinois

- Fight song of the University of Illinois
- Lyrics: Howard Ruggles Green, 1910
- Music: Harold Vater Hill, 1910
- Published: 1915

"Oskee Wow-Wow" (along with "Illinois Loyalty") is the official fight song of the University of Illinois at Urbana-Champaign. The song was written in 1910 by two students, Harold Vater Hill, Class of 1911 (1889–1917), credited with the music, and Howard Ruggles Green, Class of 1912 (1890–1969), credited with the lyrics.

== History ==
"Oskee-Wow-Wow" is an invented phrase similar to other college cheers and yells. The Illinois cheer was used from before the turn of the 20th century.

In the summer of 1910, Hill and Green composed and entered "Oskee-Wow-Wow" and several other songs into a contest for a student-composed opera. The opera was never finished, so the two attempted to sell the musical numbers to a publisher. They managed to sell the song to Charley Graham, the manager of the U. of I. Supply Store (also known as the Co-Op) for $100. Hill and Green attempted to publish "Hail to the Orange" by printing it on the back cover of "Oskee-Wow-Wow," but Graham refused, citing the song's lack of "punch." "Oskee Wow Wow" was copyrighted in 1911. Melrose Bros. Music Co., Inc. of Chicago published it as sheet music in 1928 It became popular as the school's primary fight song primarily because "Illinois Loyalty," the older fight song, was not well suited to rousing large crowds at a game.

== Lyrics ==
The piano + voice score from the original publication by the U. of I. Supply Store
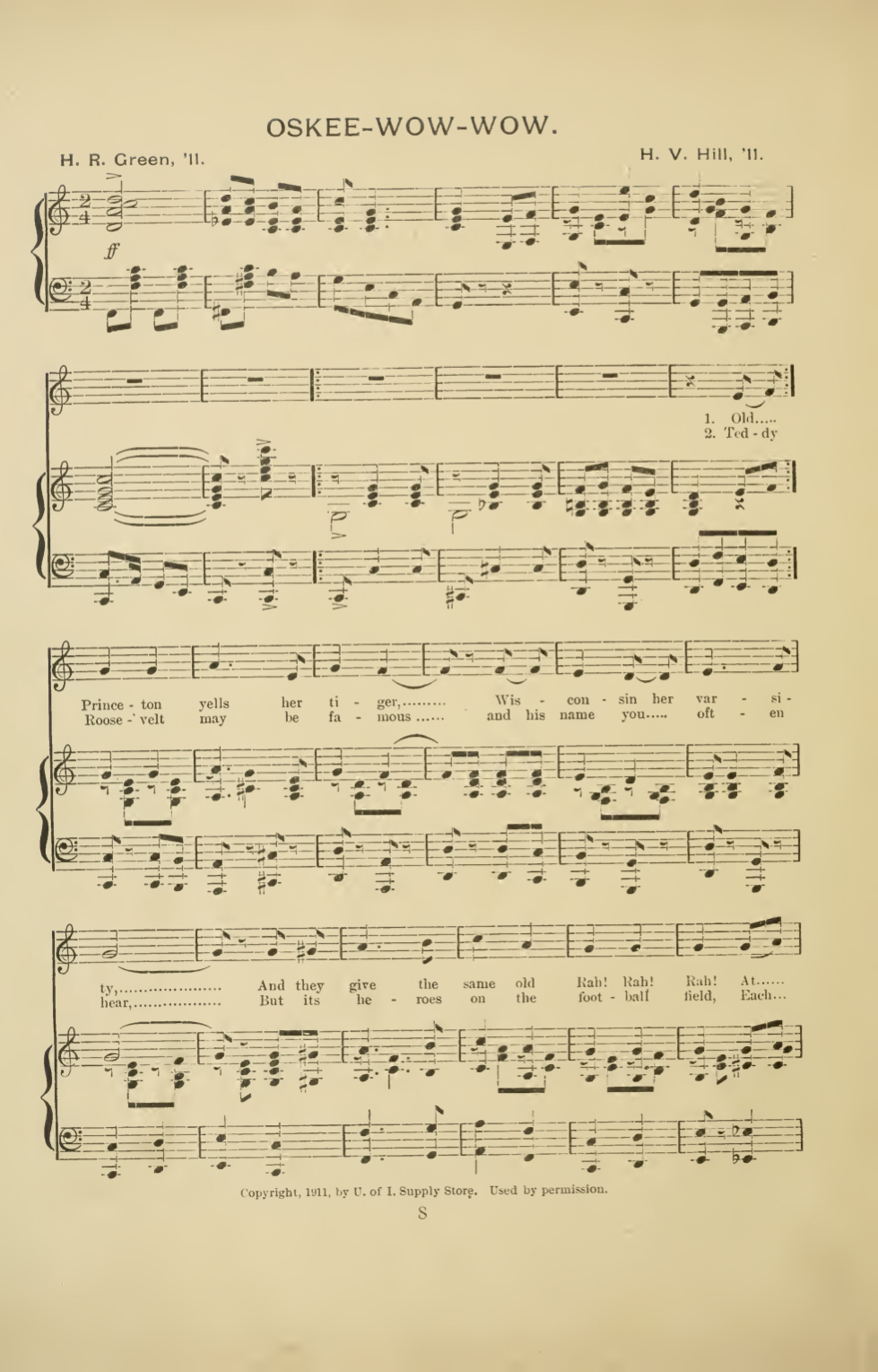
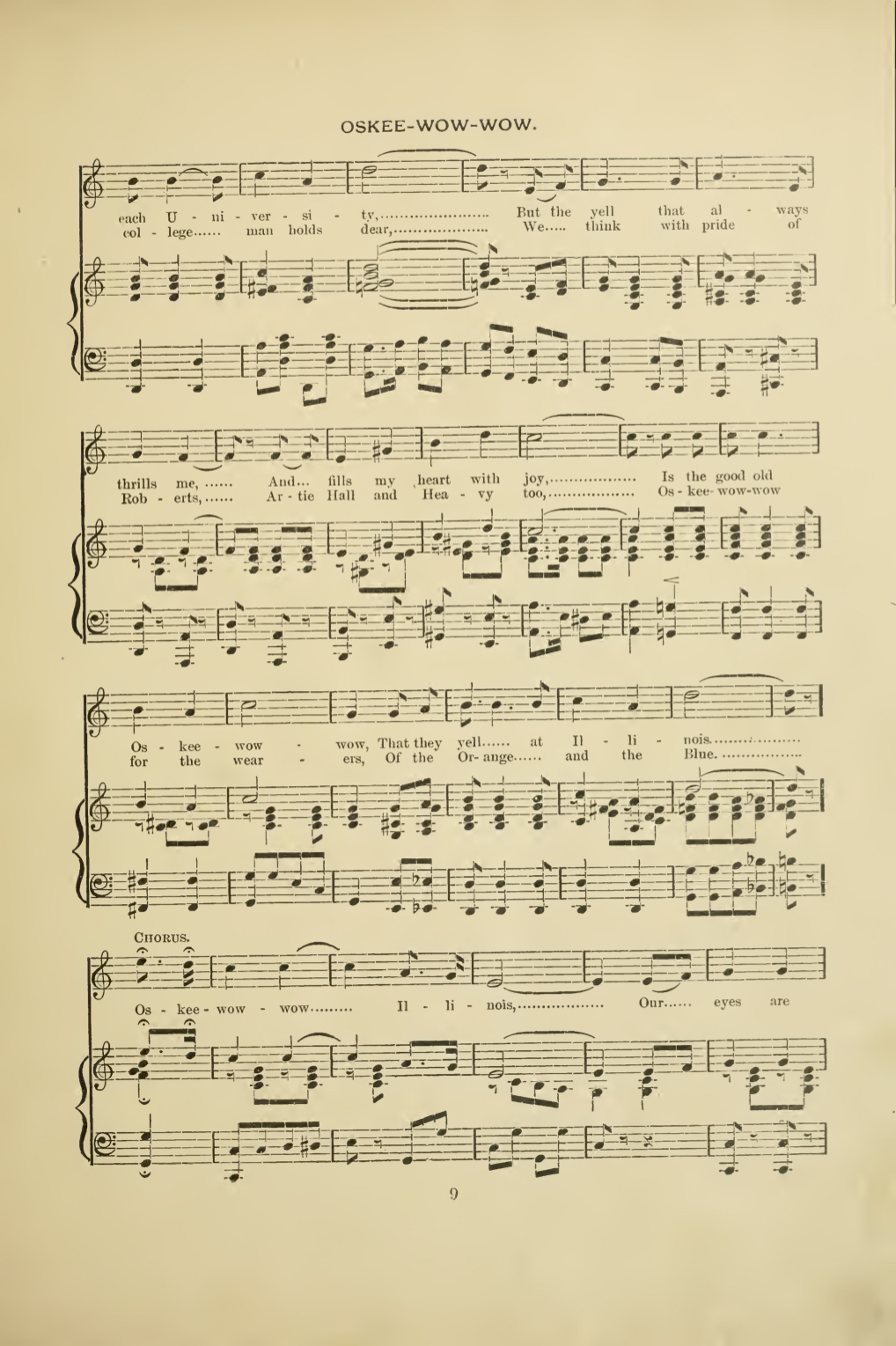
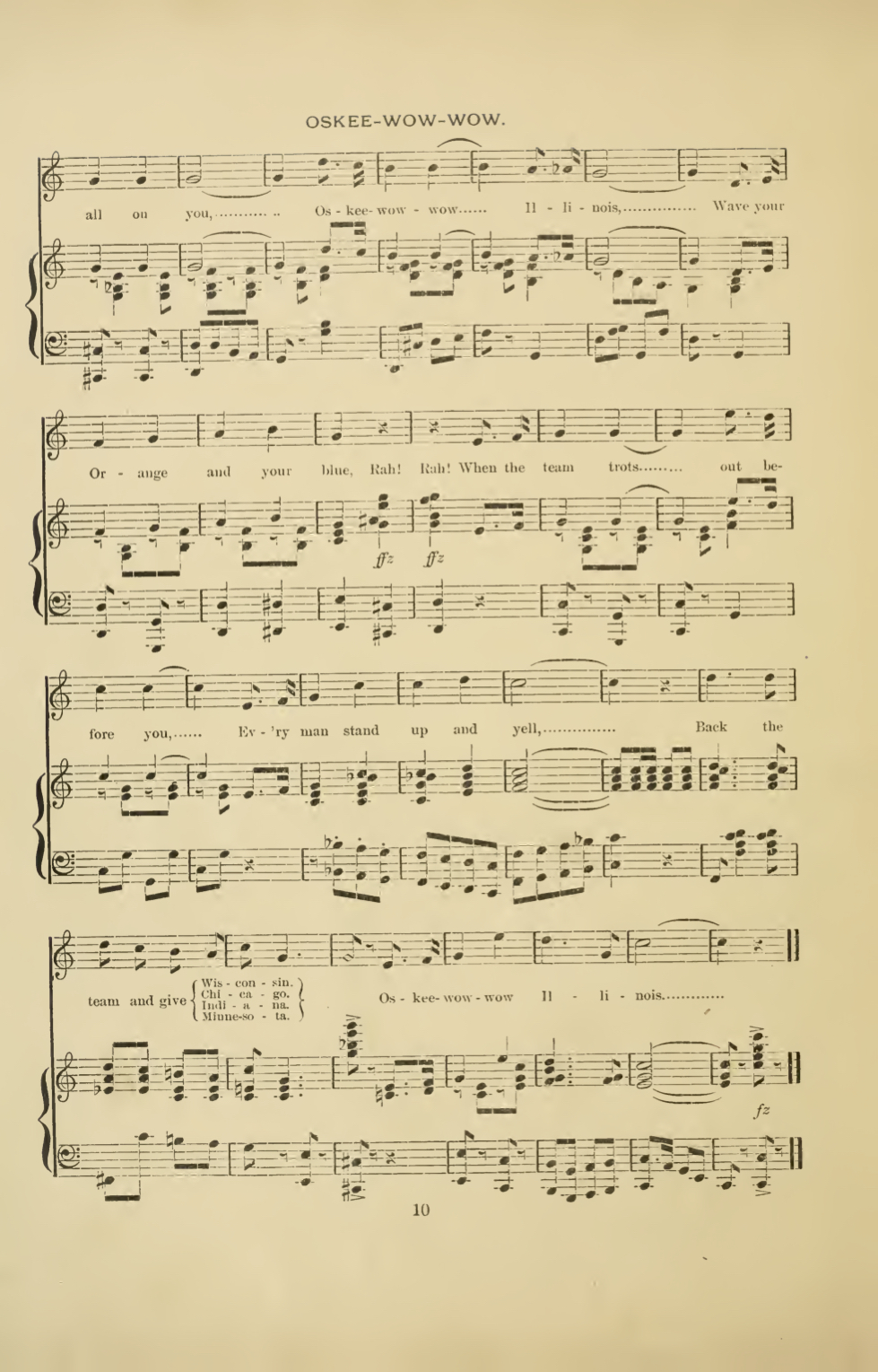

The original words of the song are as follows:

Verse 1
Old Princeton yells her tiger
Wisconsin her varsity
And they give the same old Rah! Rah! Rah!
At each University
But the yell that always thrills me
And fills my heart with joy
Is the good old Oskee wow-wow
That they yell at Illinois

Chorus
Oskee-wow-wow Illinois
Our eyes are all on you
Oskee-wow-wow Illinois
Wave your Orange and your blue Rah! Rah!
When the team trots out before you
Ev'ry man stand up and yell
Back the team and give [opponent's name]
Oskee-wow-wow Illinois

Verse 2
Teddy Roosevelt may be famous
and his name you often hear
But it's heroes on the football field
Each college man holds dear
We think with pride of Roberts
Artie Hall and Heavy too
Oskee wow-wow for the wearers
Of the Orange and the Blue

Chorus

== Media ==
The music is included in the ″Illini Fantasy″, a medley of Illinois songs and marches arranged for concert band by James Curnow in 1970 as a commission from Director of Bands Harry Begian.

There have long been two versions of the song. Most commonly, it is played "from the hold" at the start of the chorus, when the "O" in "Oskee Wow-Wow" is held out. This version is played after first downs and touchdowns in football and leading into time-outs in basketball. Coincidentally, the buzzers at nearly every arena are in the same chord as the hold. The song was played "from the top" after an extra point was kicked but was replaced in favor of "Fight, Illini."

For many years, the band started playing the song "from the top" toward the end of the warmup period in basketball. When conducted correctly, the "hold" was played just as the buzzer sounded.

The song appears to have been written to be played after a touchdown, as it slows down while being played "from the top" before picking back up after the "hold."

== See also ==
- List of University of Illinois songs
- Marching Illini
- Oski Yell
