= List of school songs =

List of hymns or anthems of educational institutions

A school song, alma mater, school hymn or school anthem is the patronal song of a school. In England, this tradition is particularly strong in public schools and grammar schools.

== Australia ==
- Somerville House — Our God, Our Help in Ages Past
- The Glennie School — Now Thank We All Our God
- St Aloysius College — The Blue and Gold Forever

== Canada ==
- Bishop's College School — And did those feet in ancient time (Jerusalem) & Lennoxville Vivat Dicimus
- Cape Breton University — "Rise Again"
- Upper Canada College — Praise My Soul, the King of Heaven
- Shawnigan Lake School — There's a Voice in the Wilderness

== England ==
- Barnard Castle School — "Jerusalem"
- Charterhouse School — "Carmen Carthusianum"
- Douai School — "Ad Multos Annos"
- Haberdashers' Aske's Boys' School — "Jerusalem"
- Harrow School — "Forty Years On"
- King Edward VI Grammar School, Chelmsford — "Jerusalem"
- Loughborough Grammar School — "Our Father, by Whose Servants"
- Millfield School — Jerusalem
- The London Oratory School — "Quam Bonum Est"
- Oundle School — "Carmen Undeliense"
- Reigate Grammar School — "To Be a Pilgrim"
- Sherborne School — The Carmen
- Sir William Turner's Grammar School - "Gaudeamus igitur"
- Stamford High School — “Within these walls of grey”
- The Judd School — "Jerusalem"
- The Latymer School — "The Latymer School Song"
- The Leys School — "Χαίρετε"
- The Skinners' School — "The Leopard Song"
- Tonbridge School — "Of Him Who Dreamed of Founding"
- William Hulme's Grammar School — "The Hulme Song" and "Jerusalem"

== India ==
- Carmel Convent High School, Durgapur — Within Thy Hallowed Portals Carmel Dear
- Loyola School, Thiruvananthapuram — Cheer Loyola's sons
- St. Ann's High School, Secunderabad — Scenes Of Our Childhood
- St. Paul's School, Darjeeling — The Alma mater

== Japan ==
- Doshisha University — Doshisha College Song
- Hokkaido University — Tokoshie no Sachi
- Hosei University — Hosei University School Song
- Kansai University — Kansai University Song
- Keio University — Keio University College Song
- Kwansei Gakuin University — Sora no Tsubasa
- Meiji University — Meiji University School Song
- Rikkyo University — Eikou no Rikkyo
- Ritsumeikan University — Ritsumeikan University Song
- Waseda University — Miyako no Seihoku

== New Zealand ==
- Auckland Grammar School — Per Angusta Ad Augusta set to the music of A Mighty Fortress is Our God
- Dilworth School — St Patrick's Breastplate

== Pakistan ==
- Pakistan School Song — This poem (prayer) was sung as school song in almost all the Pakistani schools.

== Scotland ==
- Royal High School — Vivas Schola Regia
- The High School of Glasgow — O Alma Mater Glorious

== Sri Lanka ==
- Royal College, Colombo — "School of our Fathers"
- St. Anthony's College, Kandy — "Rally Round the Banners of the College"

== United States ==
- College of William and Mary — "Our Alma Mater"
- Cornell University — "Far Above Cayuga's Waters"
- Columbia University — "Stand, Columbia"
- Franklin & Marshall College — "Hail! Hail! Nevonia"
- Harvard University — "Fair Harvard"
- Dartmouth College — "Dear Old Dartmouth"
- Ohio State University — "Carmen Ohio"
- Princeton University — "Old Nassau"
- Pennsylvania State University — "Penn State Alma Mater"
- Rutgers University — "On the Banks of the Old Raritan"
- San Jose State University — "San José State Alma Mater"
- Syracuse University — "Syracuse University Alma Mater"
- Texas A&M University — "Spirit of Aggieland"
- University of California, Berkeley — "All Hail Blue and Gold"
- University of California, Los Angeles — "Hail to the Hills of Westwood"
- University of Florida — "We Are the Boys from Old Florida"
- University of Georgia — "Glory, Glory"
- University of Illinois at Urbana—Champaign — "Illinois Loyalty", "Hail to the Orange"
- University of Iowa — "Alma Mater Iowa"
- University of Maine — "The Stein Song"
- University of Miami — "Alma Mater: Stand Forever"
- University of Michigan — "The Yellow and Blue"
- University of Minnesota — “The Minnesota Rouser”, “Hail! Minnesota”
- University of Nebraska–Lincoln — "Dear Old Nebraska U," "Hail Varsity"
- University of New Hampshire — "UNH Alma Mater"
- University of North Carolina — "Hark the Sound"
- University of North Dakota — "UND Alma Mater"
- University of Notre Dame — “Notre Dame, Our Mother”
- University of Pennsylvania — “Hail, Pennsylvania!”, ”The Red and Blue”
- University of Texas at Austin — "The Eyes of Texas"
- University of Virginia — "The Good Old Song"
- University of Wisconsin — "Varsity (song)"
- Yale University — "Bright College Years"

== See also ==
- Fight song
