= Hail to the Orange =

University of Illinois Urbana-Champaign alma mater

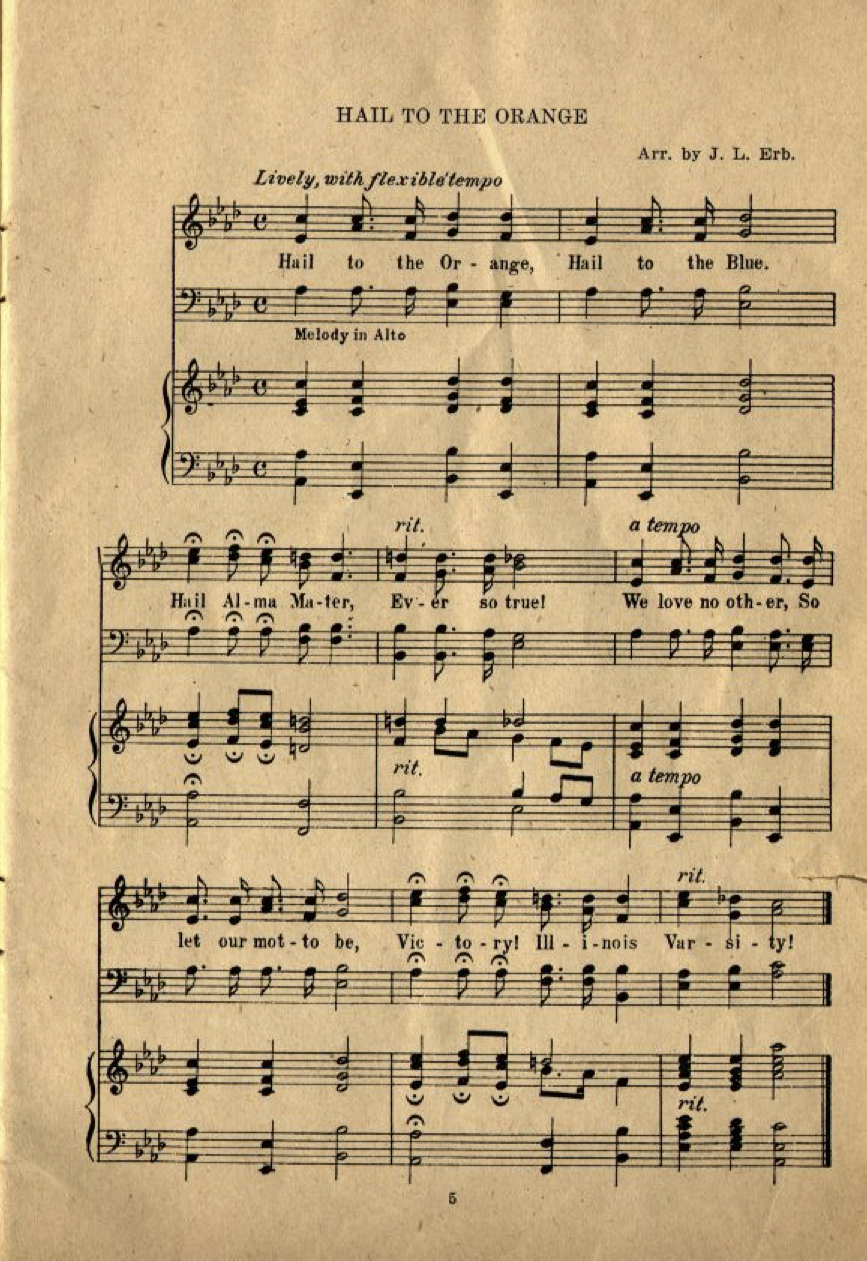
- "Hail to the Orange" as printed in Illini Songbook, 1924 edition.
- Alma mater of the University of Illinois and anthem of Sigma Alpha Epsilon
- Also known as: Hail to the Purple
- Lyrics: Howard Ruggles Green, 1910
- Music: Harold Vater Hill, 1910
- Published: 1915

"Hail to the Orange" (along with "Illinois Loyalty") is the alma mater of the University of Illinois Urbana–Champaign. Its alternate version, "Hail to the Purple," is an official song of the fraternity Sigma Alpha Epsilon. The song was written in 1910 by two students: Harold Vater Hill, credited with the music, and Howard Ruggles Green, credited with the lyrics.

== History ==
In the summer of 1910, Hill and Green composed and entered "Hail to the Orange" and several other songs into a contest for a student-composed opera. The opera was never finished, so the two attempted to sell the musical numbers to a publisher. They managed to sell "Oskee Wow-Wow" to Charley Graham, the manager of the U. of I. Supply Store (also known as the Co-Op) for $100; however, Graham refused to accept "Hail to the Orange" even as a gift to be printed on the cover of "Oskee Wow-Wow," citing the song's lack of "punch." Hill and Green rewrote the song and gave it to the national secretary of their fraternity, Sigma Alpha Epsilon, who copyrighted it in 1915 and published it in the fraternity songbook. "Hail to the Purple" has been an essential song for the fraternity's chapters ever since.

The original version, "Hail to the Orange," was first sung by a fraternity quartet at the 1911 Post-Exam Jubilee. It grew in favor through continued presentations at various glee contests. The song quickly became an essential symbol of school spirit, being published in several official university songbooks and sung at hundreds of university events. Green returned to Champaign for the 1922 homecoming and to his surprise, "Hail to the Orange" had been enjoying brisk sales and neither he nor Hill were being credited as its authors. While he eventually managed to assign credit to himself and Hill as the songwriters, Green did not receive royalties from its sales until the U. of I. Supply Store's copyright expired—twenty-eight years after he and Hill had written the song.

In the 1950s, the status of "Hail to the Orange" as a school song became a point of controversy. Students debated whether the football stadium should stand up during performances of the song, yet opposing students argued that they should only stand when "Illinois Loyalty" is played, which they claimed was the official alma mater song. Supporting students claimed that "Hail to Orange" had been universally recognized by students, faculty, and alumni. So, in November 1958, the Men's Independent Association and the Interfraternity Council urged university president David Dodds Henry to replace "Illinois Loyalty" with "Hail to the Orange" as the official alma mater song. It was discovered from this letter that "Illinois Loyalty" was never officially recognized by the university, but rather "For Good Old Illinois," by Vernon Thompson Stevens was recognized in 1916. President Henry believed that legislation of the issue could only occur when all interested groups have engaged in widespread discussion and come to an agreement. In February 1959, he asked the Alumni Board of the Alumni Association and the university's Student Senate to begin the discussion. By March, President Henry announced that the university would not be making any decisions regarding official school songs. "Illinois Loyalty" and "Hail to the Orange" would remain in competition with "For Good Old Illinois" for the title of "official alma mater song."

== Lyrics ==
"Hail to the Orange" arranged by John Lawrence Erb (left) and "Hail to the Purple" (right)

The lyrics as written by Green for "Hail to the Orange" are:

Hail to the Orange, Hail to the Blue.
Hail Alma Mater, Ever so true!
We love no other, So let our motto be,
Victory! Illinois Varsity!

The lyrics as written by Green for "Hail to the Purple" are:

Hail to the Purple, Hail to the Gold!
Hail to Phi Alpha, motto of old!
Hail Success Fraternity in years yet to come!
Hail Sigma Alpha Epsilon!

== Media ==
The Marching Illini first played "Hail to the Orange" in 1922 and has since integrated the song into their standard repertoire. It is performed as part of "Three in One" at the end of each halftime performance. It is also sung a cappella in 4-part harmony before the band is dismissed at the end of the post-game concert following each home game.

In 1938, Hill's sister, Frances Hill Arms, presented Sigma Alpha Epsilon, Illinois Beta chapter with a bronze tablet honoring his musical contributions to the fraternity and the university. In August 1964, Green was awarded the Merit Key Award and a Citation from Sigma Alpha Epsilon for his co-authorship of "Violets" and "Hail to the Purple," two of the fraternity's most popular songs. In October 1966, Green was presented with another award, this time from the University of Illinois Alumni Association for his co-authorship of "Hail to the Orange."

"Hail to the Orange" is played (typically at the beginning) of every Altgeld Chimes concert since the 1960s.

== See also ==
- "Illinois Loyalty"
- "Oskee Wow-Wow"
- Sigma Alpha Epsilon
- List of University of Illinois songs
