= UND Alma Mater =

Song

The "UND Alma Mater" is a school song of the University of North Dakota in Grand Forks, North Dakota. The Carillon Americana bells at the top of Twamley Hall on campus play the tune of Alma Mater each day at noon.
