= California Indian Song =

Fight song of the University of California, Berkeley

The California Indian Song was a school fight song of the University of California, Berkeley, written by Harold Bingham in 1907 celebrating the rivalry between the California Golden Bears and the Stanford Cardinal. At that time, the mascot of Stanford University was the Stanford Indian, but the mascot was abandoned in 1972 because it was considered offensive. The California Indian Song was also abandoned, but has recently found a new fan base among Golden Bears fans.

The song was played by the Cal Band at athletic events or rallies against Stanford, but the band only played the chorus as the other verses were yelled to mimic a Native American war chant. In addition, the lyrics were not regularly sung at official events due to the politically insensitive themes. The "tomahawk" referenced in the chorus refers to the Stanford Axe.

In November 2012, the band internally decided to cease playing the song until words could be rewritten. In the Spring of 2013 the song was rechristened "Gold and Blue" with new lyrics.

== See also ==
- Native American mascot controversy
