= Alma Mater Iowa =

Alma Mater Iowa is the alma mater hymn for the University of Iowa.

The lyrics were written by Gene Mills - a graduate of the university's College of Engineering in 1947 and the melody was composed in 1960

== Lyrics ==
Come all alums of Iowa, and blend your voices true;
Sing praises to our Alma Mater, as good Hawkeyes do.
Let's keep within our hearts a fire to magnify her fame;
Bring credit to these noble halls where glory and honor reign.
The day is near when comrades here will bid farewell and part;
But each Hawkeye carries on, thy spirit in his heart.
Oh! Iowa, Iowa, we drink a toast to you;
We pledge our everlasting love for dear old Iowa U.
Alma Mater, Iowa.
