= Ben Hill Griffin Stadium =

American college football stadium of the University of Florida

Coordinates: 29.6500°N 82.3486°W

Steve Spurrier–Florida Field at Ben Hill Griffin Stadium
- The Swamp
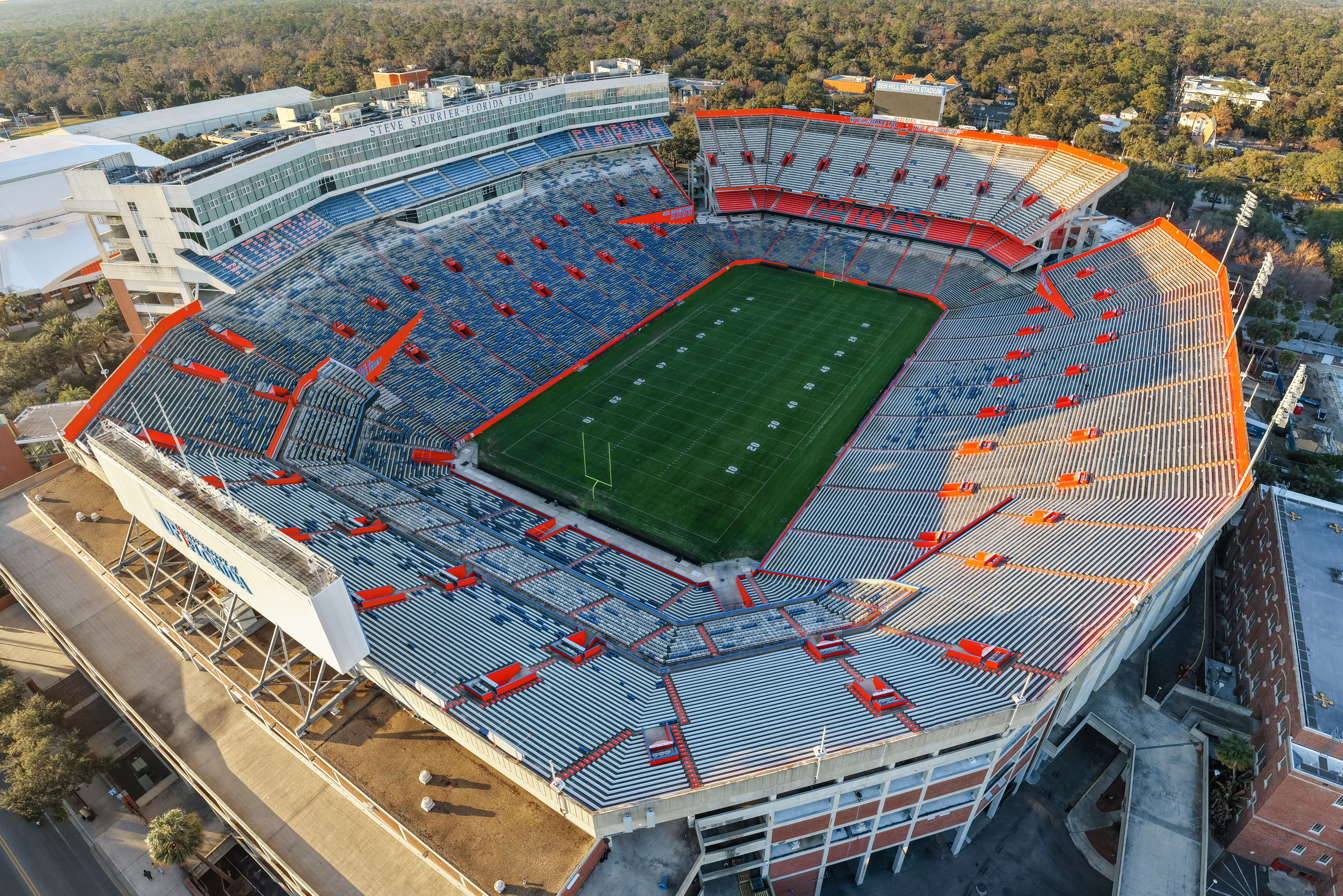
- The stadium in 2026
- Interactive map of Steve Spurrier–Florida Field at Ben Hill Griffin Stadium
- Former names: Florida Field (1930–1989); Ben Hill Griffin Stadium at Florida Field (1989–2016)
- Location: 157 Gale Lemerand Drive, Gainesville, Florida 32611, United States
- Operator: University Athletic Association
- Capacity: 88,548 (2003–present) Former capacity List: 83,000 (1991–2002); 72,000 (1982–1990); 62,800 (1966–1981); 46,164 (1960–1965); 40,116 (1950–1959); 21,769 (1930–1949)
- Surface: Natural grass (1930–1970); AstroTurf (1971–1989); Bermuda grass (1990–present)
- Record attendance: 90,916

Construction
- Groundbreaking: April 16, 1930
- Opened: November 8, 1930; 96 years ago
- Renovated: 2003, 2011, 2015, 2017
- Expanded: 1950, 1960, 1966, 1982, 1991, 2003, 2008
- Cost: $118,000 (1930)($2,149,000 in 2023 dollars)
- Architect: Rudolph Weaver

Tenants
- Florida Gators football (NCAA) (1930–present); Tangerine Bowl (NCAA) (1973); Gator Bowl (NCAA) (1994)

Website
- floridagators.com/ben-hill-griffin-stadium

Ben Hill Griffin Stadium (in full Steve Spurrier–Florida Field at Ben Hill Griffin Stadium), popularly known as "The Swamp", is a football stadium in Gainesville, Florida, United States. It is located on the campus of the University of Florida and is the home field of the Florida Gators football team. It was originally known as Florida Field when it opened as a 22,000-seat facility in 1930, and it has been expanded and renovated many times over the ensuing decades. Most of the university's athletic administration offices have been housed under the west stands of the stadium since the 1960s. It was also home to most football offices and training areas until a large stand-alone facility for the program opened nearby in 2022.

Ben Hill Griffin Stadium is the largest stadium in Florida, the 12th largest stadium in the United States, and the 20th largest stadium in the world, as measured by its official seating capacity of 88,548 – though, it has often held over 90,000 for Florida's home football games.

== Location ==
Ben Hill Griffin Stadium is located on the northern edge of the University of Florida's Gainesville campus. The stadium and its approach are bordered by West University Avenue to the north, Gale Lemerand Drive to the west, and Stadium Road to the south. To the east is the University of Florida Campus Historic District, which is the oldest portion of the campus and includes the Murphree Area student residence complex, the Florida Gymnasium, and Ustler Hall. Just west of the stadium across Gale Lemerand Drive is the Stephen C. O'Connell Center, which is the home arena for the Florida Gators men's basketball, women's basketball, gymnastics, volleyball, and swimming and diving teams. Beside the O'Connell Center are several football practice fields, an indoor football practice facility, and a football training and administrative building that opened in 2022.

== Naming ==
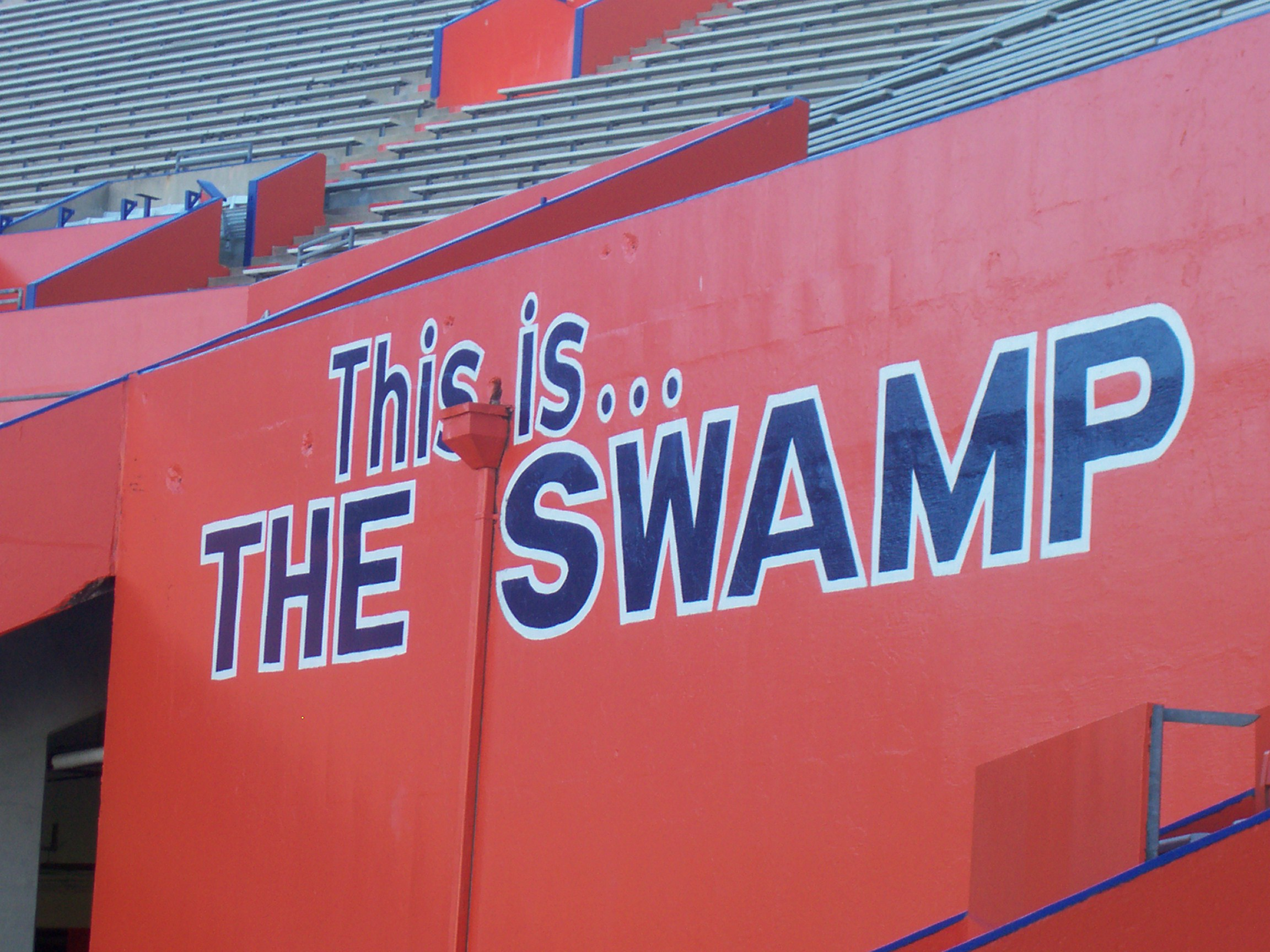
Steve Spurrier dubbed Florida Field "The Swamp" in 1992

The name of the facility was simply "Florida Field" from its opening in 1930 until 1989, when the university renamed the stadium in honor of citrus magnate Ben Hill Griffin, Jr., an alumnus and major benefactor of the university and its sports programs. However, the playing surface remained "Florida Field", and the facility's full name was "Ben Hill Griffin Stadium at Florida Field" from 1990 until 2016.

On September 3, 2016, the playing surface was renamed in honor of former Florida quarterback and head coach Steve Spurrier. As UF athletic director Jeremy Foley explained, "Coach Spurrier did more than win a Heisman Trophy, a national championship, and a bunch of games. Coach Spurrier changed the culture of Florida Athletics." As a result, the facility's official name is now "Steve Spurrier-Florida Field at Ben Hill Griffin Stadium".

The facility may be best known as simply "The Swamp", a nickname which was coined by Spurrier in 1992. As he explained at the time, "A swamp is where Gators live. We feel comfortable there, but we hope our opponents feel tentative. A swamp is hot and sticky and can be dangerous. We feel like it's an appropriate nickname for our stadium." Both the "Swamp" nickname and the "only Gators get out alive" tagline added later by UF's sports marketing department quickly became popular and have been commonly used ever since.

== Stadium history ==
=== Earlier facilities ===
From the establishment of the University of Florida in Gainesville in 1906 until the 1910–1911 academic year, the school's intercollegiate football team and club-level baseball team played and practiced at Gainesville's municipal athletic park known The Ballpark or as "The Baseball Park".

The university began developing its first on-campus sports field in 1910, when it purchased and cleared open land just west of the campus. Wooden bleachers were installed and a football gridiron and baseball diamond were laid out by the end of the year, and University Athletic Field made its debut in January 1911 when the Florida Gators baseball team opened the season at the new facility. Florida's football team began play there in 1911, which was also the year that they began using the "Gators" nickname. Larger bleachers were installed in 1915, when the facility was rechristened "Fleming Field" in honor of recently deceased former Florida governor Francis P. Fleming.

Fleming Field had primitive amenities and a maximum capacity of about 5000 with standing room. As Florida began scheduling contests against established football programs from across the south, several "home" games per season were held at larger venues across the state, usually Fairfield Stadium in Jacksonville and Plant Field in Tampa.

=== Construction, expansions, and renovations ===
Aerial view of Florida Field (center), the Graham Field track (bottom), and the Fleming Field baseball diamond (top), mid-1930s

==== Initial planning and construction ====
Florida's football program first earned national prominence in the 1920s, prompting incoming university president John J. Tigert to begin a drive to construct a proper on-campus stadium upon his arrival in 1928. With state funding unavailable at the cusp of the Great Depression, the semi-independent University of Florida Athletic Association was organized to raise funds and oversee the project, and Tigert and ten supporters of Florida's athletic program took out personal loans to expedite construction of the $118,000, 22,000-seat football stadium.

The Gators practicing under the lights before Florida Field's first night game in 1950

Construction began on April 16, 1930, and soon faced serious engineering and geotechnical obstacles related to natural groundwater and drainage. The chosen site was a shallow ravine, with approximately 30 rows of the current seating area below the level of the surrounding land. During preliminary excavation and leveling work, water from a previously unknown underground stream began to pour into the construction site from the north, miring the future playing surface in mud. The problem was resolved with the installation of massive underground culverts that diverted the stream to Graham Pond two blocks south of the stadium site, and ultimately, to Lake Alice in the then-undeveloped southern side of the UF campus.

The groundwater issues delayed completion of the stadium and forced the Gators to play the first several home games of the 1930 season at Fleming Field. A construction team of 80 laborers and mules finally completed Florida Field in time for the homecoming game on November 8, 1930, against Alabama, the dominant Southern Conference team of the day.

In 1934, Florida Field was dedicated to the memory of Florida servicemen who died in World War I, and a memorial plaque to that effect was installed on the outside wall behind the north end zone.

==== Expansions ====
As originally designed, Florida Field had a capacity of 21,769 and consisted of a gently-sloping, U-shaped concrete grandstand encompassing approximately the lower half of the current seating area. The first row of seats is quite close to the sidelines, so when the university decided to add a running track a year after the stadium opened, it was installed perpendicular to the football field beyond the open-ended south endzone. This adjoining track facility, which was used by the Florida Gators track and field program beginning in 1932, had its own set of bleachers and was known as Graham Field.

Since then, Florida Field has undergone many renovations and expansions, almost always adding more seats. The official seating capacity is currently 88,548, although the actual attendance for key games has regularly exceeded 90,000. It is the second largest sports facility in the state of Florida behind only the Daytona International Speedway.

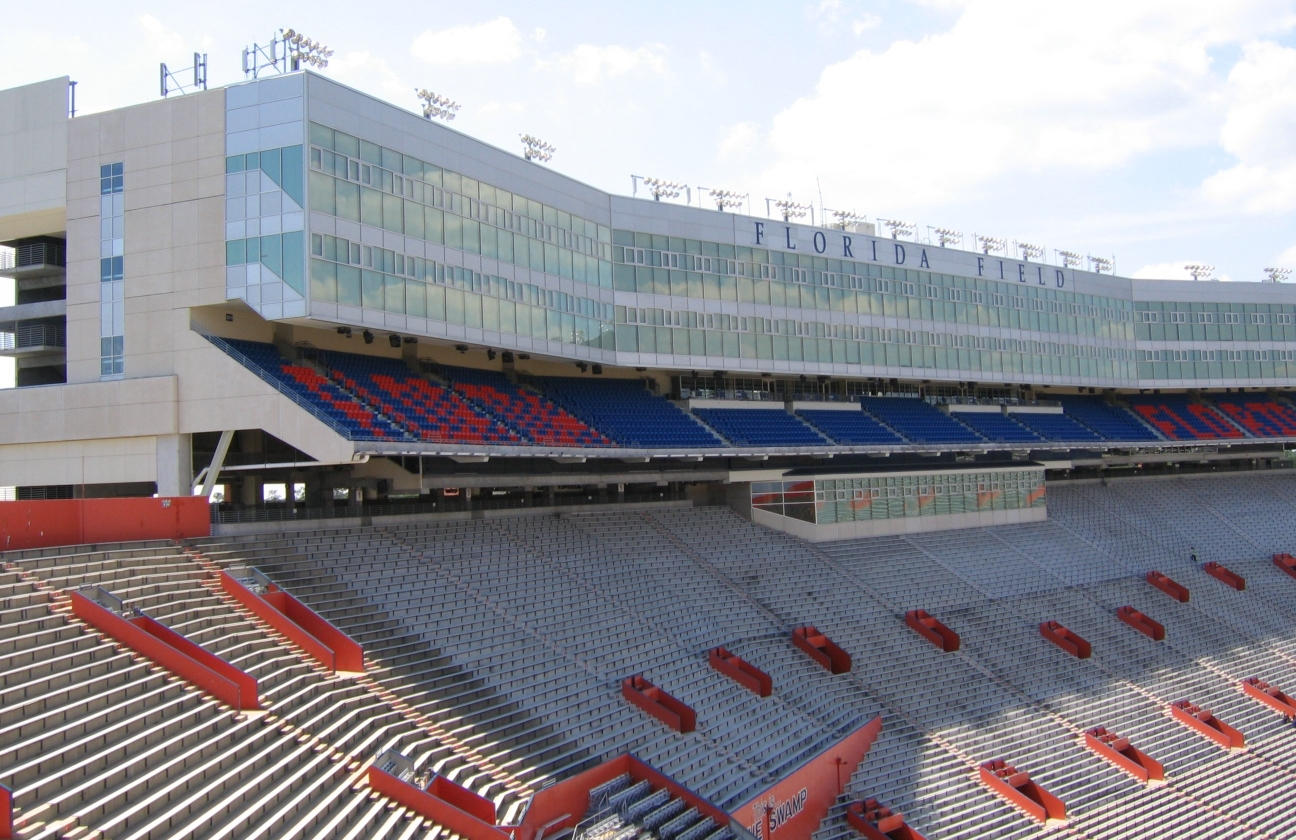
Ben Hill Griffin Stadium's luxury boxes, completed in 2003

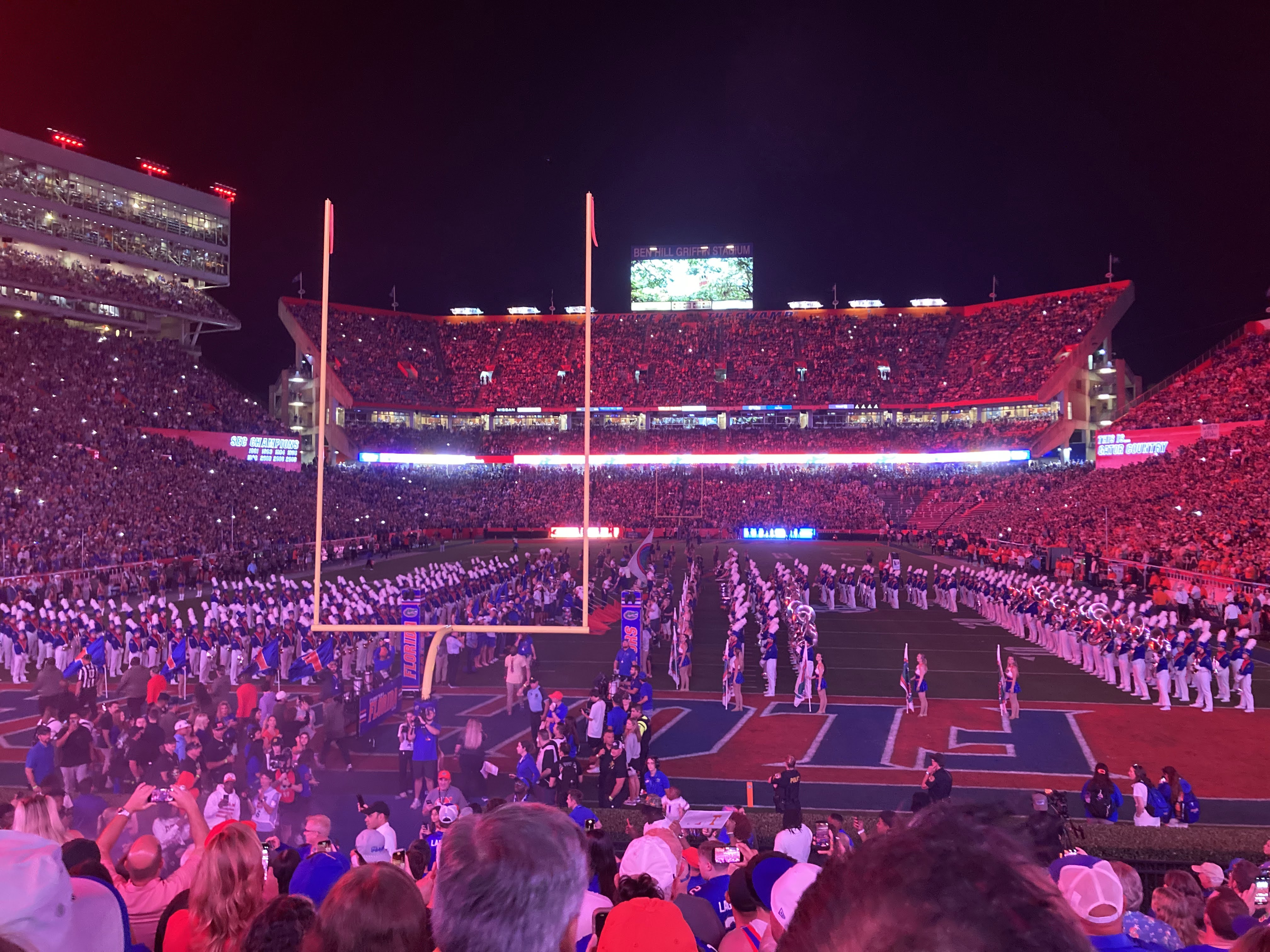
Ben Hill Griffin Stadium shortly before Florida's loss to Tennessee on November 22nd, 2025.

Significant expansions and additions include:

- In 1949–1950, capacity was almost doubled to about 40,000 with the addition of a second tier to the west stands and the installation of bleachers in the previously open south endzone. A press box was also added atop the west stands and stadium lights were installed, allowing the 1950 season to kick off with the Gators' first home night game, a 7–3 win over The Citadel.
- An extensive expansion in 1965–1966 doubled the size of the east grandstand while developing the facility for other uses by adding a dormitory (Yon Hall) for male athletes under the new east stands along with office space and meeting areas for the football program and UF's athletic department under the existing west stands. The press box was significantly enlarged and modernized at this time, and larger bleachers were installed in the south endzone, increasing capacity to over 60,000. These additions necessitated the removal of the adjacent running track, which was replaced by nearby Percy Beard Track Stadium.
- In 1982, the south endzone was enclosed with a new double-decked grandstand that featured Florida Field's first chairback seats and a wide concourse under the upper deck that allowed a view of the field. The new concourse connected with existing concourses under the east and west grandstands so that fans could circle the stadium, though not with a constant view of the playing field. Beneath the new grandstand, modern training and weight room facilities for the football team were added.
- In 1991, a large upper deck of "Sunshine Seats" and a middle deck of club seating dubbed the "Touchdown Terrace" were constructed above the existing north endzone seats. Under the new seating area, a wide concourse was added along with new entrances and a façade that extended the stadium across an existing road and onto Fleming Field. This expansion completed the double-decked bowling-in of the stadium and raised capacity to over 85,000, making Florida Field the largest stadium in the state.
- In 2003, the press box was expanded and several levels of club seats and luxury boxes were added on either side, stretching the structure across the top of the entire west grandstand. The entrance to the new boxes extended the stadium far enough to the west that a bend was added to Gale Lemerand Drive to provide adequate pedestrian space between the stadium and the street.
- In 2008, the Heavener Football Complex opened on the exterior southwest corner of Ben Hill Griffin Stadium. The $28 million addition, which was funded entirely with private donations, is meant to be the "front door" of the football program and houses a museum highlighting Florida Football history along with offices, meeting space, and other facilities. At about the same time, new Daktronics HD-16 video boards were installed atop the upper deck of both endzones.
- After the 2011 season, an extensive renovation of the concourse under the west stands improved restrooms, lighting, concessions, and crowd circulation patterns and added flat-screen displays so that fans can keep track of the game in the enclosed area. Also, bronze statues of Florida's three Heisman Trophy winners (Steve Spurrier, Danny Wuerffel, and Tim Tebow) were placed outside the stadium near the center of the west grandstand.
- In 2015, an indoor football practice facility opened across the street from Florida Field. In 2022, the Heavener Football Training Center opened beside the practice facility. This stand-alone football complex includes updated locker rooms, a 3-D hologram training center, modern strength and conditioning areas, hydrotherapy facilities, meeting rooms, a player nutrition center, and offices, with some of these functions transferred from older facilities under the stands of Florida Field.

==== 2026 Renovation ====
In 2017, Florida athletic director Scott Stricklin and other athletic officials shared plans to "upgrade the overall quality of the fan experience" at Ben Hill Griffin Stadium. As initially conceived, the plan was to update stadium technology and add more luxury areas and chair-back seating at the expense of reducing overall stadium capacity by several thousand, a detail which met with some pushback from fans and boosters. The project was to be carried out in several phases with a 2025 completion target. The first phase began in 2018 with the installation of hundreds of small Wi-Fi routers and ribbon video boards along with other relatively minor fan experience and cosmetic improvements.

The COVID-19 pandemic postponed subsequent phases of the project, during which time the university significantly expanded its scope from a "short-term fix" to a "50-year solution" and sought out ways to minimize seating capacity loss and preserve the character of the venue. During this rethinking phase, Florida officials toured Fenway Park, Wrigley Field, and Lambeau Field, all older stadiums which had been modernized with major renovations that sought to keep their historic character.

In June 2026, the university unveiled plans for a $1.45 billion renovation, the most expensive and extensive stadium upgrade in college football history. The project will rebuild concourses and most other fan areas, install modern video and audio systems, address long-deferred maintenance and infrastructure issues, and widen aisles and add handrails to comply with ADA guidelines. To counterbalance the loss of seats in the lower bowl due to ADA improvements, a tier of open-air "premier" seating areas will be added atop the existing stadium. As Strickland explained on a podcast, "We can sit there and just not touch it and let it fall into disrepair, or we can finally address it and try to do something in a thoughtful manner that makes The Swamp stay The Swamp and try to minimize that impact as much as possible." The expansion is also expected to nearly double stadium revenues from $75 million to $145 million. Construction is scheduled to begin after the 2026 season and be completed in 2030, with the football team continuing to use the facility while renovations are ongoing.

=== Playing surface ===
The playing surface of Florida Field has also changed over the years. It was natural grass until 1971, when AstroTurf was installed and nicknamed "Doug's Rug" for then-coach Doug Dickey. The original artificial surface was replaced with an updated version in 1980, and it remained until 1990, when newly hired coach Steve Spurrier insisted it be removed and replaced with natural grass to help prevent player injury. In June 2012, the playing surface was completely removed down to the substrate to install an improved drainage system and in-ground sensors to measure moisture levels and temperature. Since that work was completed, the turf on Florida Field has been a Bermuda grass hybrid developed by UF's Institute of Food and Agricultural Sciences to better resist drought, disease, and damage. The field is usually overseeded with rye grass late in the football season to compensate for wear and tear.

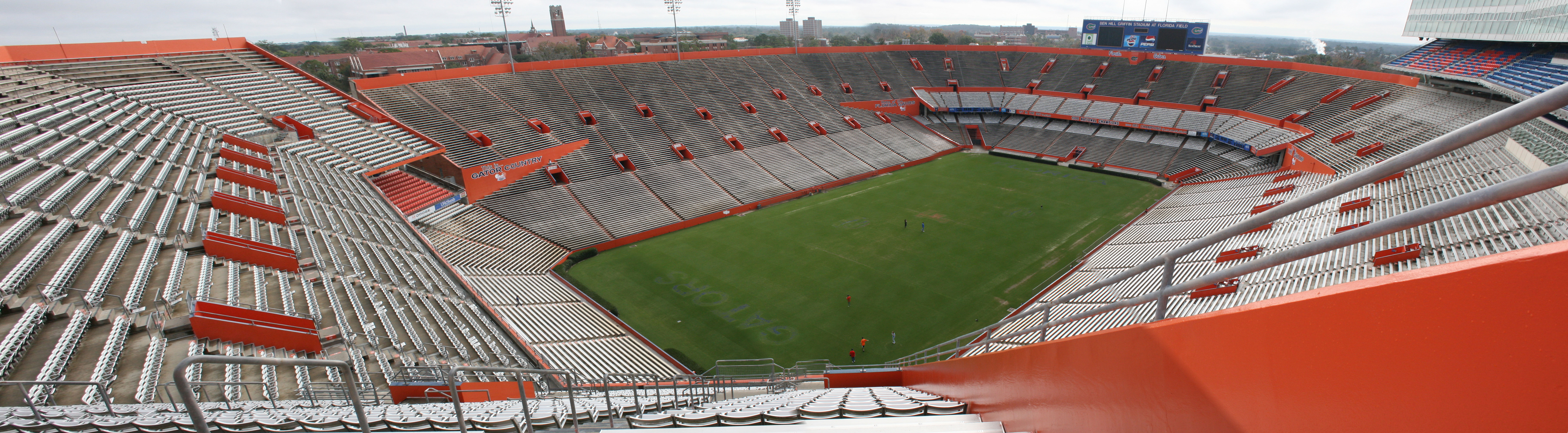
Panorama of the field

=== Other home fields ===
Florida has played the vast majority of their home contests at Florida Field since it opened in 1930. The most notable exception is the annual Florida-Georgia game, which has been held in Jacksonville since 1933 with the two teams alternating being the official home team. The only seasons since 1933 in which UF and UGA did not meet in Jacksonville were 1994 and 1995, when the old Gator Bowl was being rebuilt as the venue now known as EverBank Stadium for the NFL's expansion Jacksonville Jaguars and the contest was held at Florida Field and Georgia's Sanford Stadium, respectively.

In years past, Florida would occasionally schedule a home game in Jacksonville, Tampa, or (less frequently) Miami and Orlando. But besides the annual meeting with Georgia, the Gators have not played a regular season home contest anywhere besides Florida Field since September 1980, when they defeated the California Golden Bears in old Tampa Stadium. Not coincidentally, this game was played the season prior to Florida Field's south endzone expansion, which made it the largest football stadium in Florida.

== Home field advantage ==
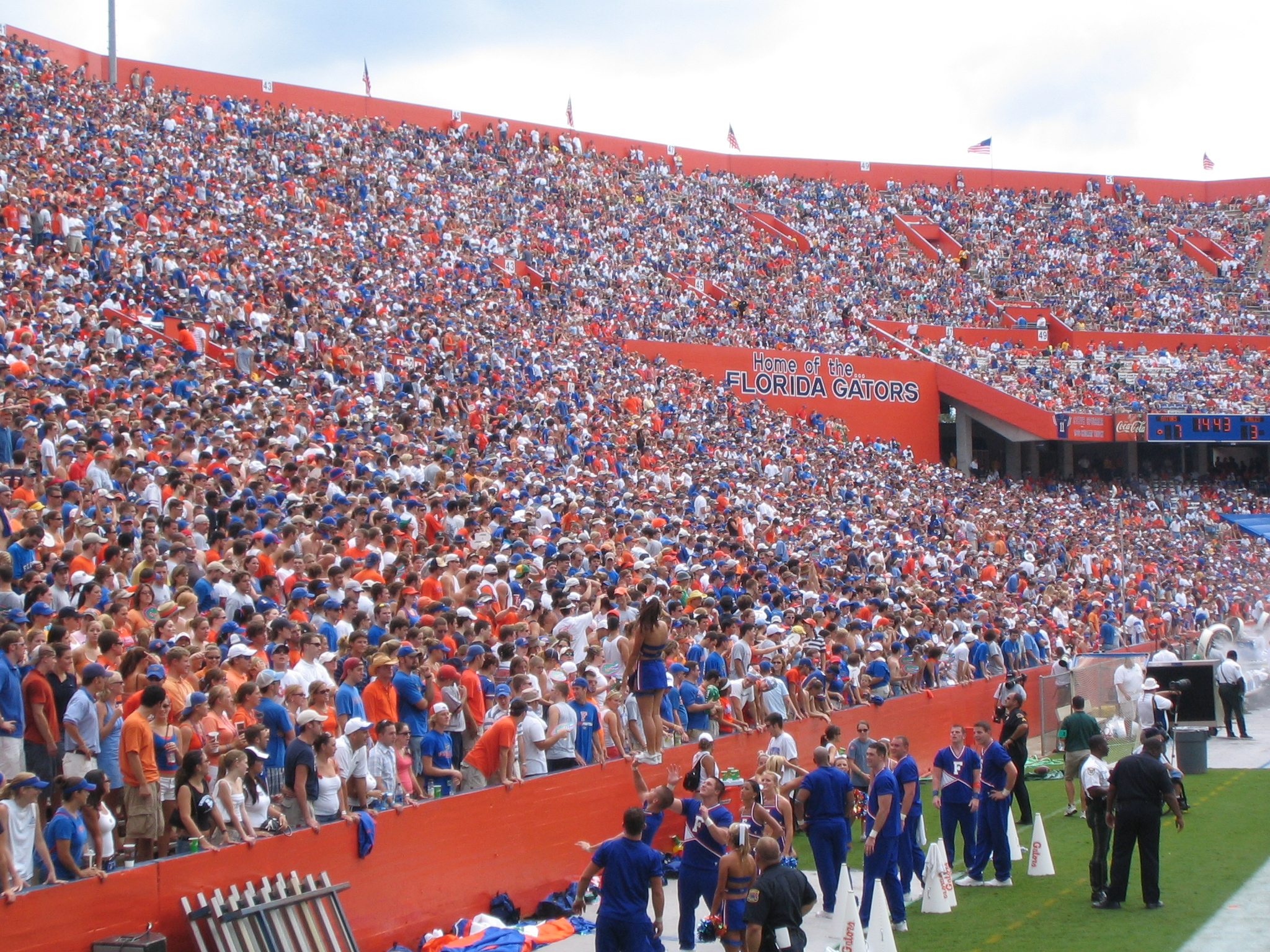
A packed Swamp.

The Swamp has acquired a reputation for being a difficult place for opposing teams to play, and has regularly been ranked at or near the top of lists of top home field advantages and/or best game day experiences in college football.

One of the major reasons is the stadium's design. Originally built in a shallow sinkhole, the playing surface is below ground level. Expansions have enclosed the playing area on all sides with steep stands, and the fans are within a few feet of the action. This traps crowd noise inside the stadium, which results in sound levels on the field which have been measured at 115 decibels—just short of the threshold of pain.

The enclosed playing area also enhances the effects of Gainesville's warm and humid fall climate. Game day temperatures at field level have been known to exceed 100 °F (37 °C), creating a swamp-like atmosphere. (This was the impetus for a University of Florida researcher, Robert Cade, to develop Gatorade as a way to combat dehydration.) Furthermore, during hot and sunny day games, Florida's sideline (on the stadium's west side) is in the shade provided by the press box, while the visiting team's sideline (on the stadium's east side) is exposed to the sun.

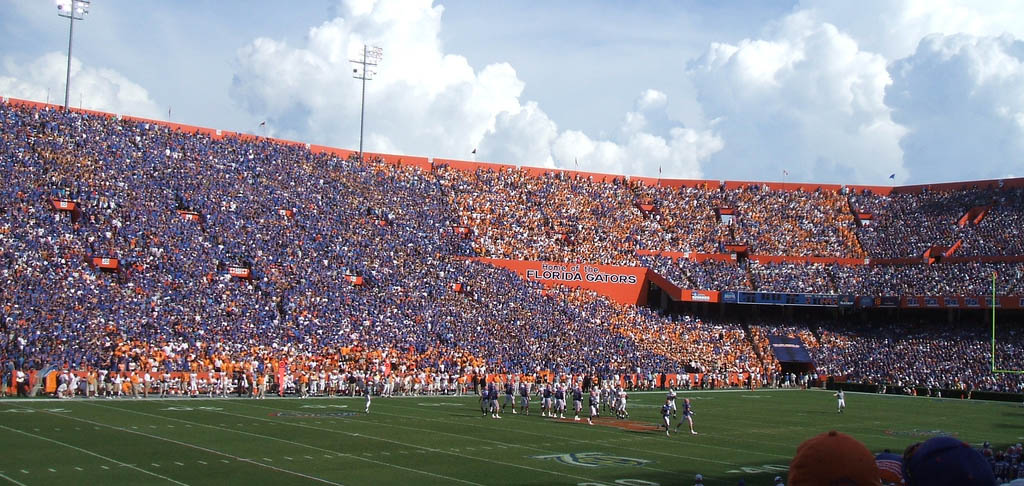
A "blue out" for Tennessee.

Florida fans are loyal (having sold out every home contest from 1979 until 2011) and loud, thus creating a tremendous home field advantage for the Gators. The size and exuberance of the home crowds, when combined with the stadium's close-in design of the seats, concentrates the fan noise at field level, making the Swamp one of the loudest stadiums in America. In 2019, Auburn coach Gus Malzahn said that the Swamp was louder than LSU's Tiger Stadium, and amongst the top two loudest stadiums he's ever been in. On November 30, 2019, in a game vs. Florida State, the decibel level in the swamp exceeded that of Lumen Field, home of the NFL's Seattle Seahawks, which is among the loudest in the NFL.

Combined, these factors create an intimidating environment which can rattle and disrupt opposing teams, making it difficult to hear playcalls and execute assignments. Florida Field has been repeatedly ranked by various publications as being the toughest stadium in which to play for opposing teams.

Florida's performance at home illustrates this effect. In a 20-year span beginning in 1990 (when the north endzone expansion was completed), Florida posted a 113–13 overall home record, which was the best in the nation during that period. They were particularly dominant under Coach Steve Spurrier. They went undefeated at home from the time Spurrier arrived in 1990 until 1994, and lost only three SEC home games during Spurrier's 12 years in Gainesville.

=== Top attendance ===
Rank	Date	Attendance	Opponent	Florida result
1	November 28, 2015	90,916	No. 14 Florida State	L, 2–27
2	November 28, 2009	90,907	Florida State	W, 37–10
3	September 19, 2009	90,894	Tennessee	W, 23–13
4	October 1, 2011	90,888	No. 3 Alabama	L, 10–38
5	September 18, 2021	90,887	No. 1 Alabama	L, 31–29
6	November 13, 2010	90,885	No. 22 South Carolina	L, 14–36
7	September 6, 2008	90,833	Miami	W, 26–3
7	October 20, 2012	90,833	No. 9 South Carolina	W, 44–11
9	October 6, 2012	90,824	No. 4 LSU	W, 14–6
10	September 3, 2022	90,799	No. 7 Utah	W, 29–26
11	November 26, 2011	90,798	Florida State	L, 7–21
12	September 16, 2023	90,751	No. 11 Tennessee	W, 29–16
13	September 17, 2011	90,744	Tennessee	W, 33–23
14	October 9, 2010	90,721	No. 12 LSU	L, 29–33
15	September 17, 2005	90,716	No. 5 Tennessee	W, 16–7

== Florida Field traditions ==
Like most historic college football venues, the Swamp has several notable features and is the scene of several unique game day traditions:

- Commemorated on the northwest corner of the stadium are the years of each of the team's Southeastern Conference championships and on the southeast corner are its 1996, 2006 and 2008 National Championships. Also included are tributes to the school's three Heisman Trophy winners, Steve Spurrier, Danny Wuerffel, and Tim Tebow.
- Atop the north end zone facade, the Ring of Honor commemorates some of the greatest players and coaches in Gator football history. The members are Tim Tebow, Wilber Marshall, Steve Spurrier, Danny Wuerffel, Emmitt Smith, Jack Youngblood, and Urban Meyer.
- In April 2011, life-size bronze statues of Heisman Trophy winners Steve Spurrier, Danny Wuerffel, and Tim Tebow were dedicated outside the west side of the stadium along Gale Lemerand Drive.
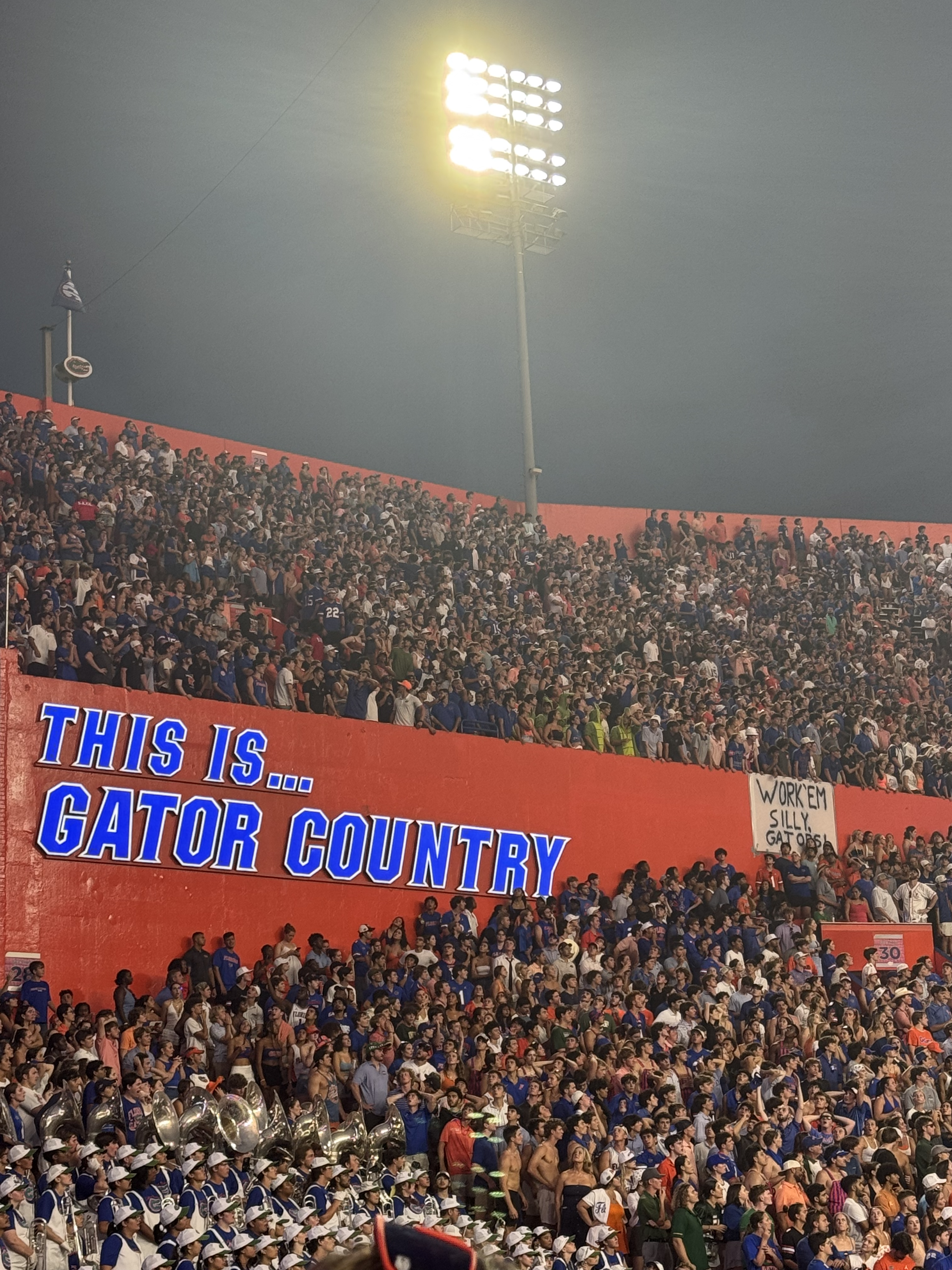
- "THIS IS... GATOR COUNTRY" sign at Ben Hill Griffin Stadium.
  Painted on the four corners of the stadium are large messages "This is . . . THE SWAMP" (previously read ". . . FLORIDA FIELD" before the mid-1990s), "This is . . . GATOR COUNTRY", the SEC Championship winning years, and the national championship winning years (updated before the 2017 season). Before that season, two of the corners had messages stating "Home of the . . . FLORIDA GATORS" (previously read " . . . FIGHTIN' GATORS" during the 1990s) and "It's Great To Be A FLORIDA GATOR" (before the 2013 season).
- Entertainment on game days includes the "Pride of the Sunshine", the University of Florida's marching band. The Pride of the Sunshine is the oldest marching band in Florida and is known for its very large bass drum, the "Biggest Boom in Dixie", which is wheeled around the field during the band's pregame performance. Like most college bands, the Gator band performs before the game, at halftime, and from their seats during breaks in the action. They are perhaps best known for playing "Jaws", a repeated two-note theme based on music from the movie Jaws while fans perform a two-armed Gator chomp.
- Albert and Alberta, one of the few costumed mascot couples in major college sports, have been attending games together since 1984. Albert debuted first, in 1970. Before the costumed mascots, a live caged alligator named Albert was often displayed along the sideline.
- Minutes before kickoff, a short hype video is shown on the large video screens, the contents of which varies slightly from season to season. At the end of each year's video, a group of real alligators is shown gathering in murky water while ominous music plays. Then the camera zooms into the gaping jaws of a large alligator while a deep voice intones "The Swamp . . . Only Gators get out alive!" as the football team takes the field.
- Jim Finch, the public address announcer at the stadium from 1966 through 2001, was known for his famously long "Heeeeeeeeeeeeeere come the Gators!" call delivered in powerful baritone as the Gators ran onto Florida Field before each game, and for his succinct and even-handed style of announcing the plays during the game. Finch died in 2002, but an audio recording of his distinctive entrance call has been used on occasion, with the current PA announcer replicating Finch's call for all other games.
- George Edmondson (a.k.a. "Mr. Two Bits"), wearing his trademark yellow oxford shirt, blue seersucker trousers, orange-and-blue tie, and black-and-white saddle shoes, traveled around the stands for almost 60 years leading fans in the old "Two Bits" cheer ("Two bits! Four bits! Six bits! A dollar! All for the Gators, stand up and holler!"). Edmondson began the tradition in 1949 and "retired" to become a regular fan after his 50th season in 1998. However, he couldn't stay in his seat and continued to lead the cheer during pre-game festivities and (occasionally) in the stands during games. On November 22, 2008, at the last home game of the season, Mr. Two Bits was again honored with a retirement ceremony. Since then, a series of "guest Mr. Two Bits" (usually former star Gator athletes) have led the pregame cheers.
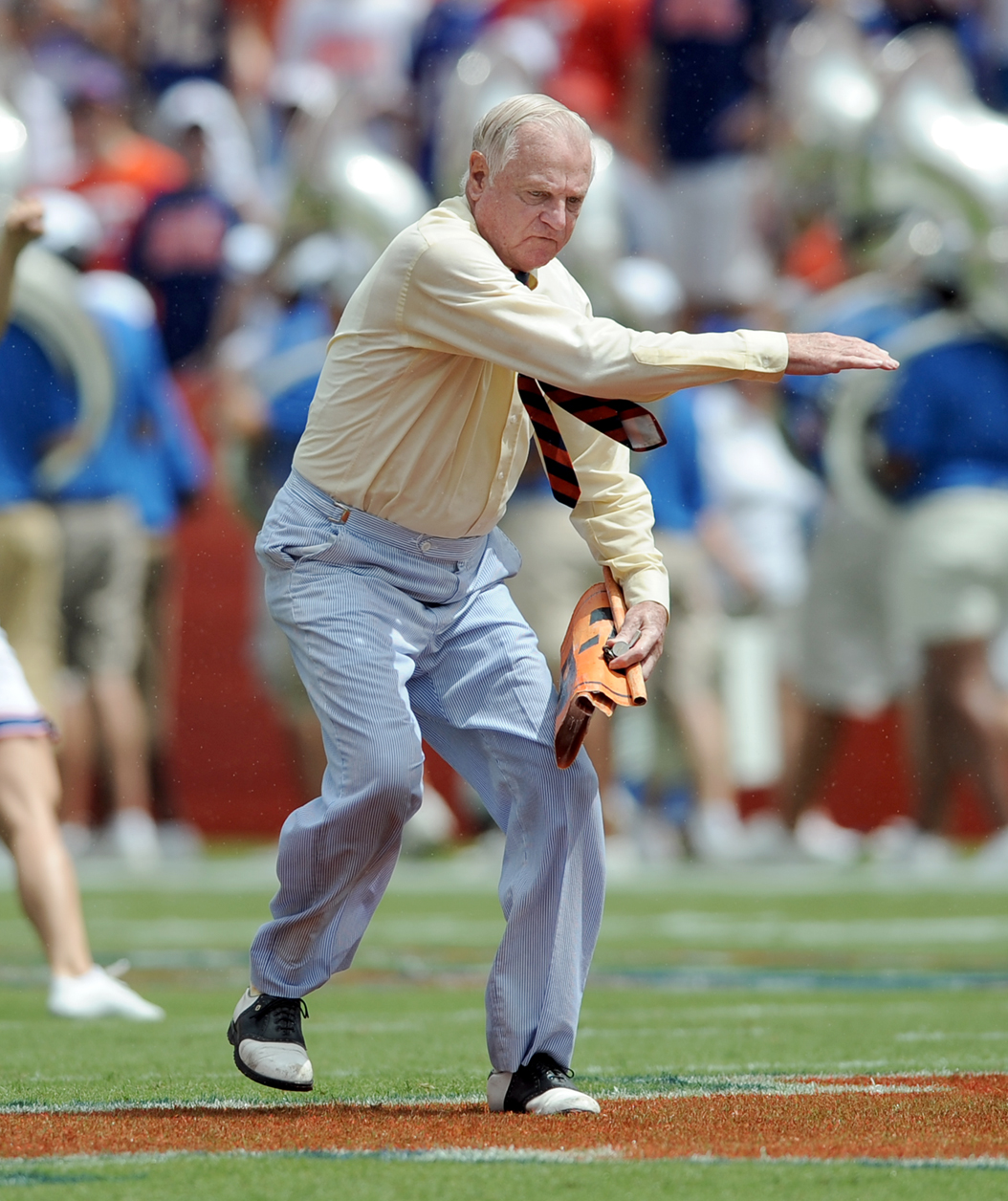
  Mr. Two Bits
- At the end of the third quarter, the Pride of the Sunshine Band plays "We Are the Boys from Old Florida" while fans sway back and forth by rows and sing along. The University of Florida was an all-male school before 1948, and singing the song at football games has been a tradition since at least the 1930s.
- Immediately following the death of musician and Gainesville native Tom Petty in October 2017, UF athletic director Scott Stricklin instituted a new tradition. Right as the band finishes playing We Are the Boys of Old Florida at the end of the 3rd quarter, Petty's song I Won't Back Down is played over the stadium speakers while fans sing along and wave their cell phones aloft to fill the stands with lights.
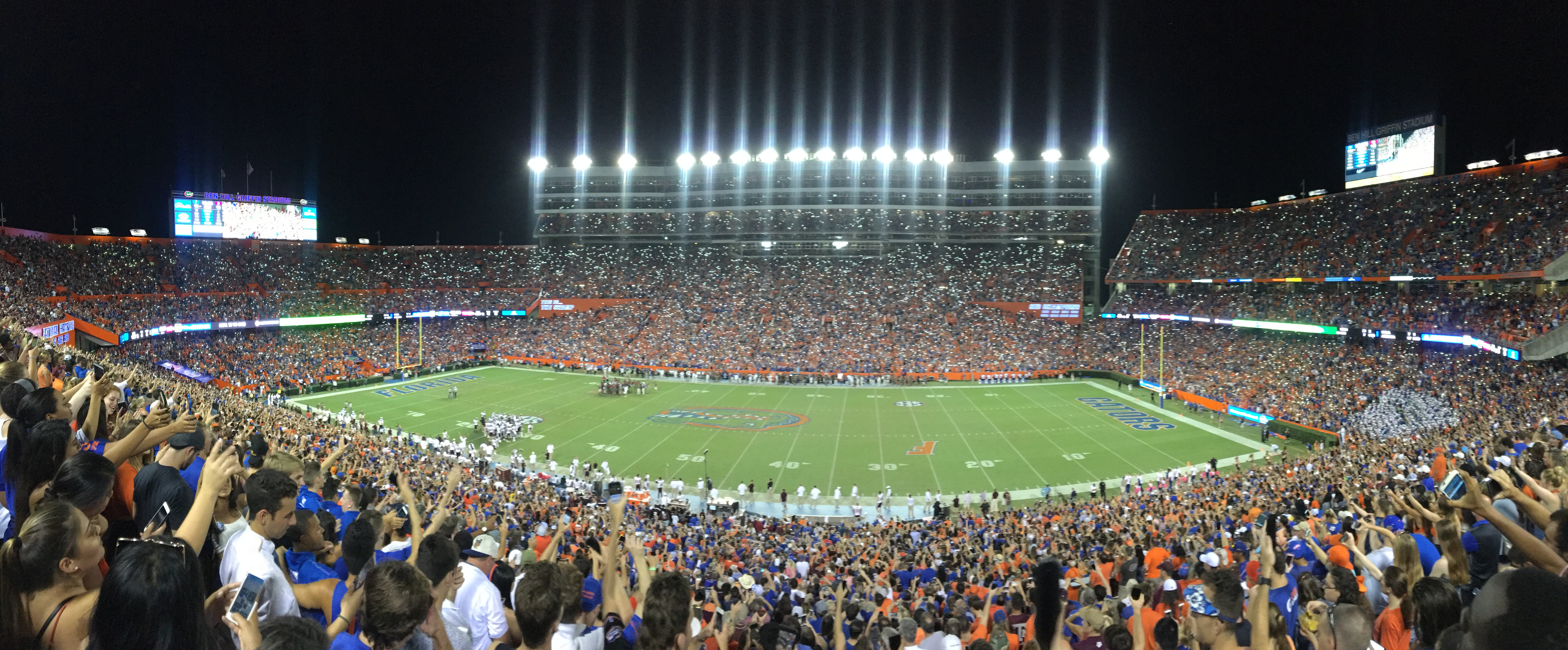
  Fans sing and wave lighted phones during I Won't Back Down
- Florida fans join in on shout-outs and chants such as "ORANGE" (yelled by students, mostly in the East and South stands) and "BLUE" (yelled by alumni, mostly in the West and North stands). During the pre-game, this cheer was led by Richard Johnston (also known as "Mike Man" or "Mr. Orange and Blue"), a former cheerleader who has been the pre-game emcee from 1984 until 2014, when current cheerleaders took over the role on a rotating basis.
- For many years, the ship's bell of the battleship USS Florida (BB-30) was mounted at stadium's North end zone wall and was rung by fans after a Florida victory. During the North end zone expansion in 1991, the bell was moved to the new north end zone concourse for display, though its clapper was removed.
- When Steve Spurrier became the Gators' head football coach in 1990, he revived the tradition of fans and players together singing the University of Florida Alma Mater after the conclusion of home football games. Upon arriving in 2005, Urban Meyer added the singing of "The Orange and Blue", the Florida fight song, after home victories.

== Notable events ==
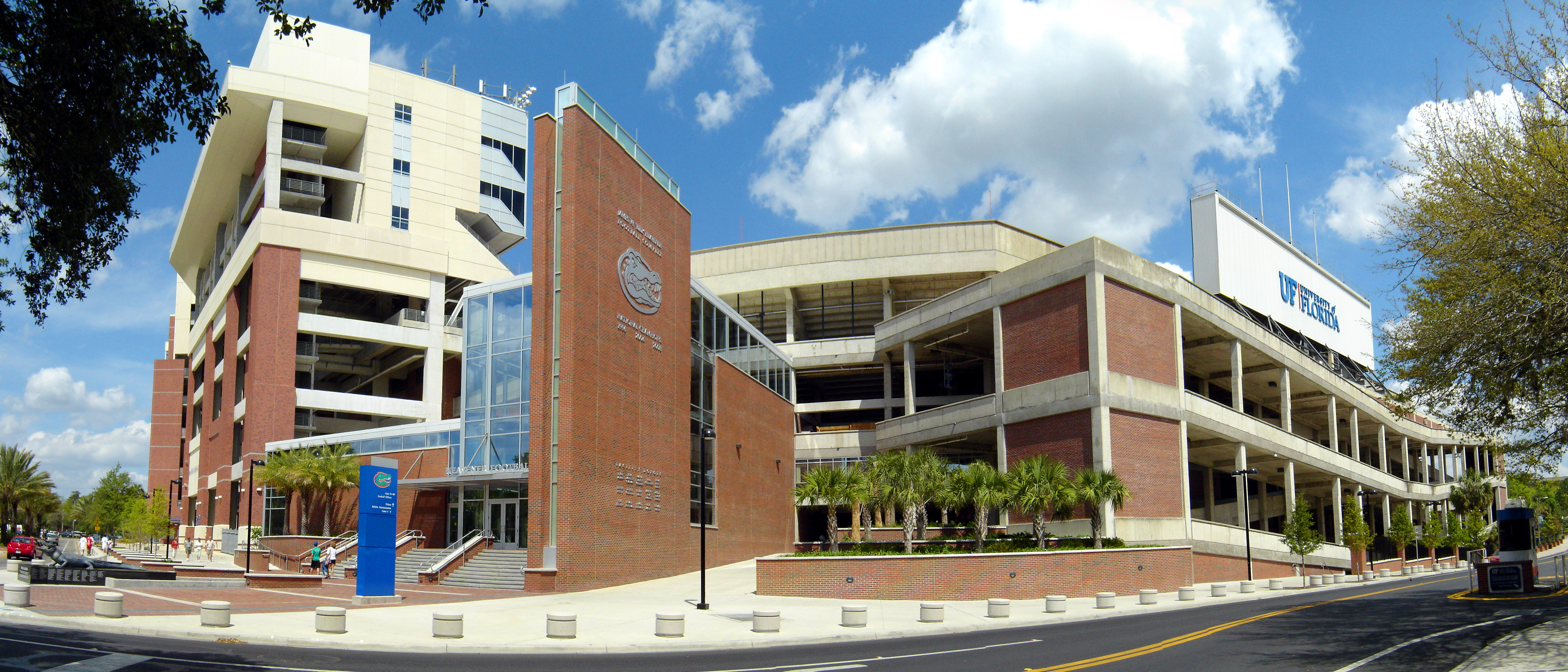
"Front door of the football program", The Heavener Football Complex

The Florida Football team plays only six or seven home games per season. At most other times, Steve Spurrier-Florida Field at Ben Hill Griffin Stadium is open for students to jog around the concourse, run stadium steps, or just sit in the stands, although the actual playing surface is off limits to prevent turf damage. The university has occasionally held large commencement ceremonies in the stadium instead of having several small ceremonies next door in the O'Connell Center, though the potential for inclement weather usually keeps the graduation events indoors.

Florida Field occasionally hosts special events.

=== Gator Growl ===
For 82 years, Florida Field was the home of Gator Growl, a student-produced show and pep rally held the Friday night before the annual homecoming football game that was long billed as the largest student-run pep rally in the world, Originally a simple affair, Gator Growl grew over the years and became a major event by the 1970s. The typical program included the introduction of senior football players by the head coach, live student skits, video skits (often with celebrity cameo appearances), a major musical act, and a headlining comedian. During the event's heyday, headliners included Robin Williams, Dennis Miller, Jerry Seinfeld, Dave Chappelle, Bill Cosby, Billy Crystal, Dane Cook, Paula Poundstone, Wayne Brady, Rodney Dangerfield, George Burns, Bob Hope, and Sister Hazel. However, a combination of high ticket prices and controversial comedic acts caused Gator Growl to fade in popularity among current students and alumni alike, and it was last held in The Swamp in 2013. Since then, it has been held at the nearby Flavet Field bandshell while trying to cater more to current students.

=== High school football ===
Steve Spurrier-Florida Field at Ben Hill Griffin Stadium has hosted the Florida high school football championships on many occasions, during which title games for different divisions are played over one weekend.

=== College bowl games ===
Florida Field has twice served as a temporary home for college bowl games when other Florida stadiums were undergoing renovations. In 1973, Florida Field hosted the Tangerine Bowl, which pitted the hometown Gators against the Miami Redskins while Orlando's Citrus Bowl was being rebuilt. The 1994 Gator Bowl between the Virginia Tech Hokies and Tennessee Volunteers was held in the Swamp while Jacksonville Municipal Stadium was being rebuilt for the National Football League's expansion Jacksonville Jaguars.

=== Concerts ===
Florida Field was once a busy concert venue, with artists such as Bob Dylan, Joan Baez, Elton John, Eagles, and Jimmy Buffett among the performers who played at the stadium. However, since Florida Field's last major expansion in 1990, the university has sharply limited the number of shows at the football stadium due to concerns over damage to the turf or the facility. So while the O'Connell Center next door has become a busy concert venue, there have only been two non-Gator Growl concerts in Florida Field since 1990: The Rolling Stones on November 27, 1994, as part of their Voodoo Lounge Tour; and Garth Brooks on April 20, 2019, during his Stadium Tour.

== Gallery ==
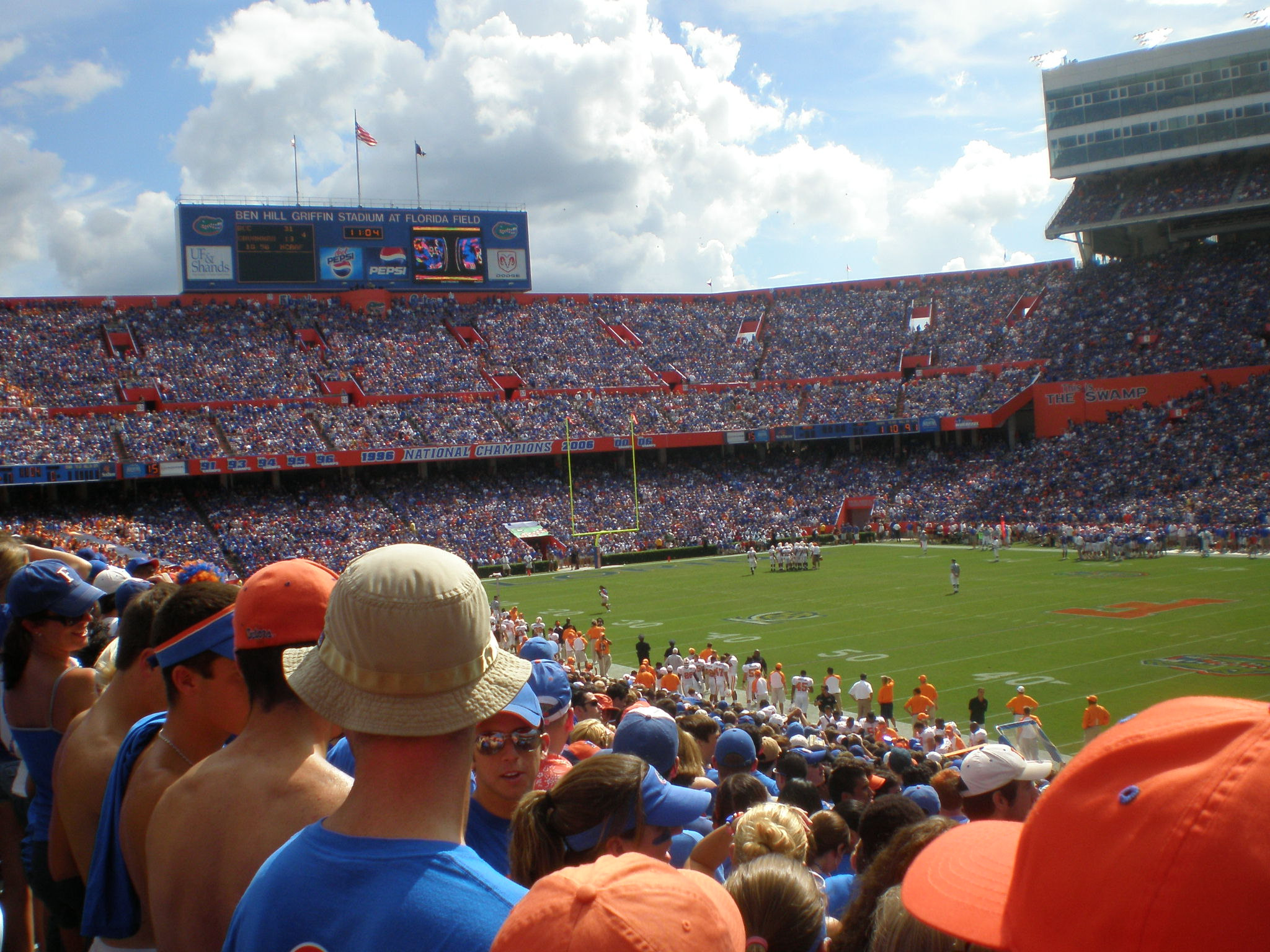
The Swamp during the 2007 "blue-out" game against Tennessee

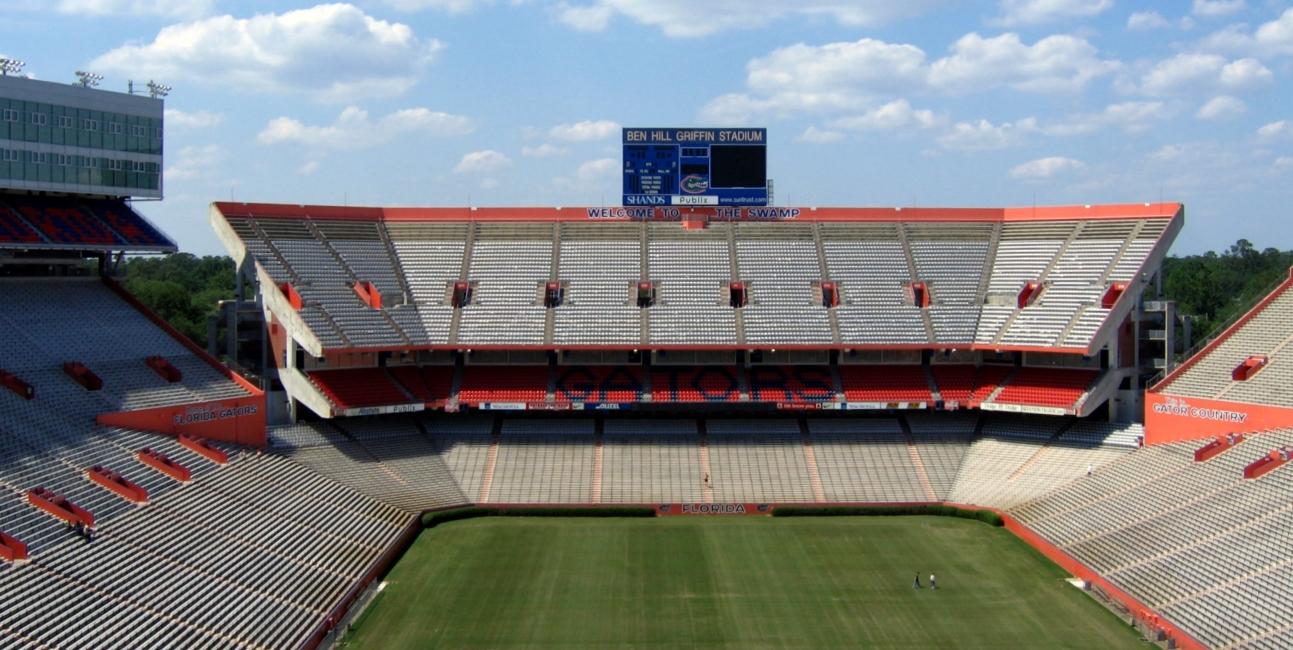
Inside Ben Hill Griffin Stadium

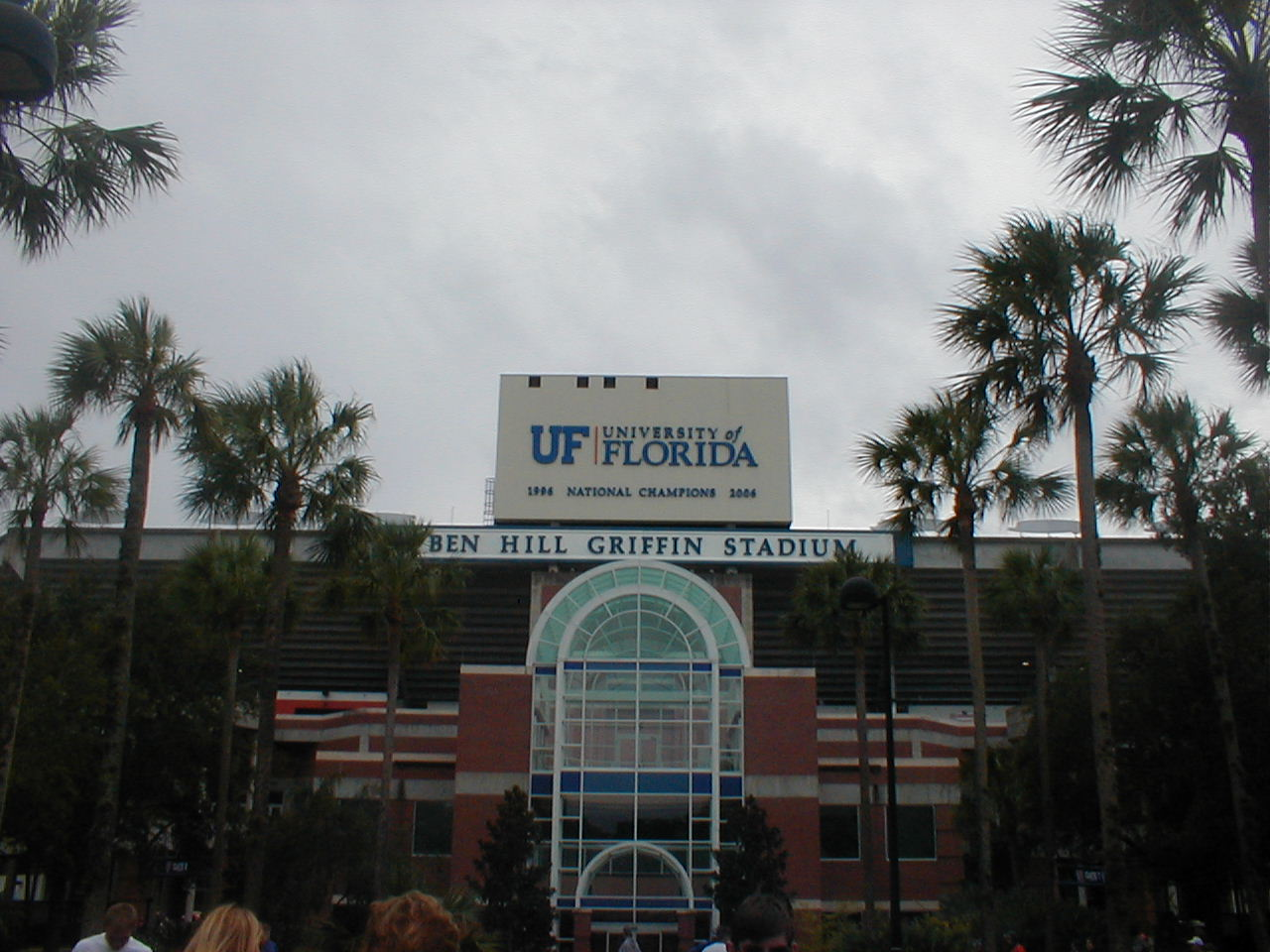
View of the north stands from outside the stadium

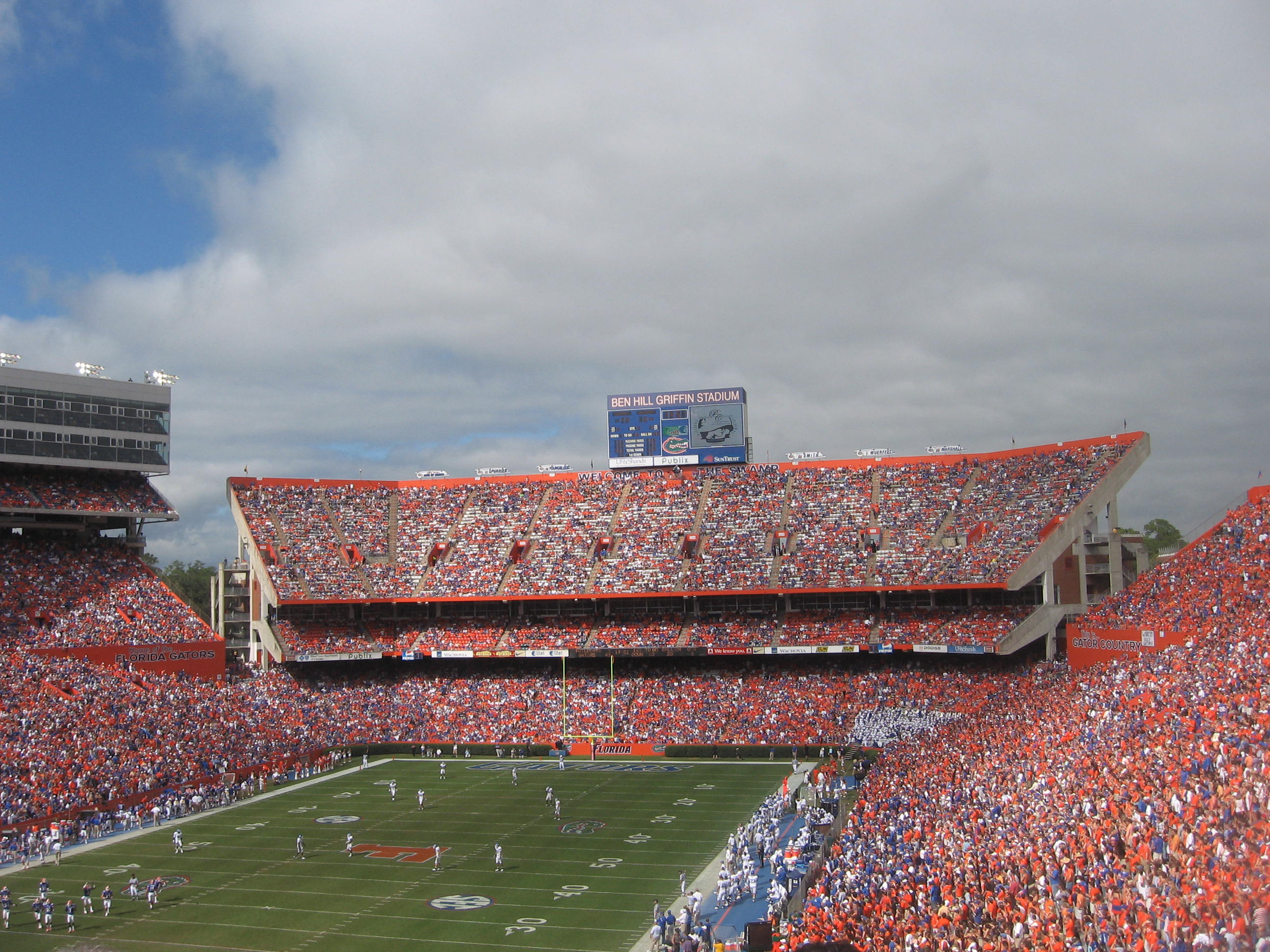
The stadium during a Football Game

The north end zone at Florida Field in 1973

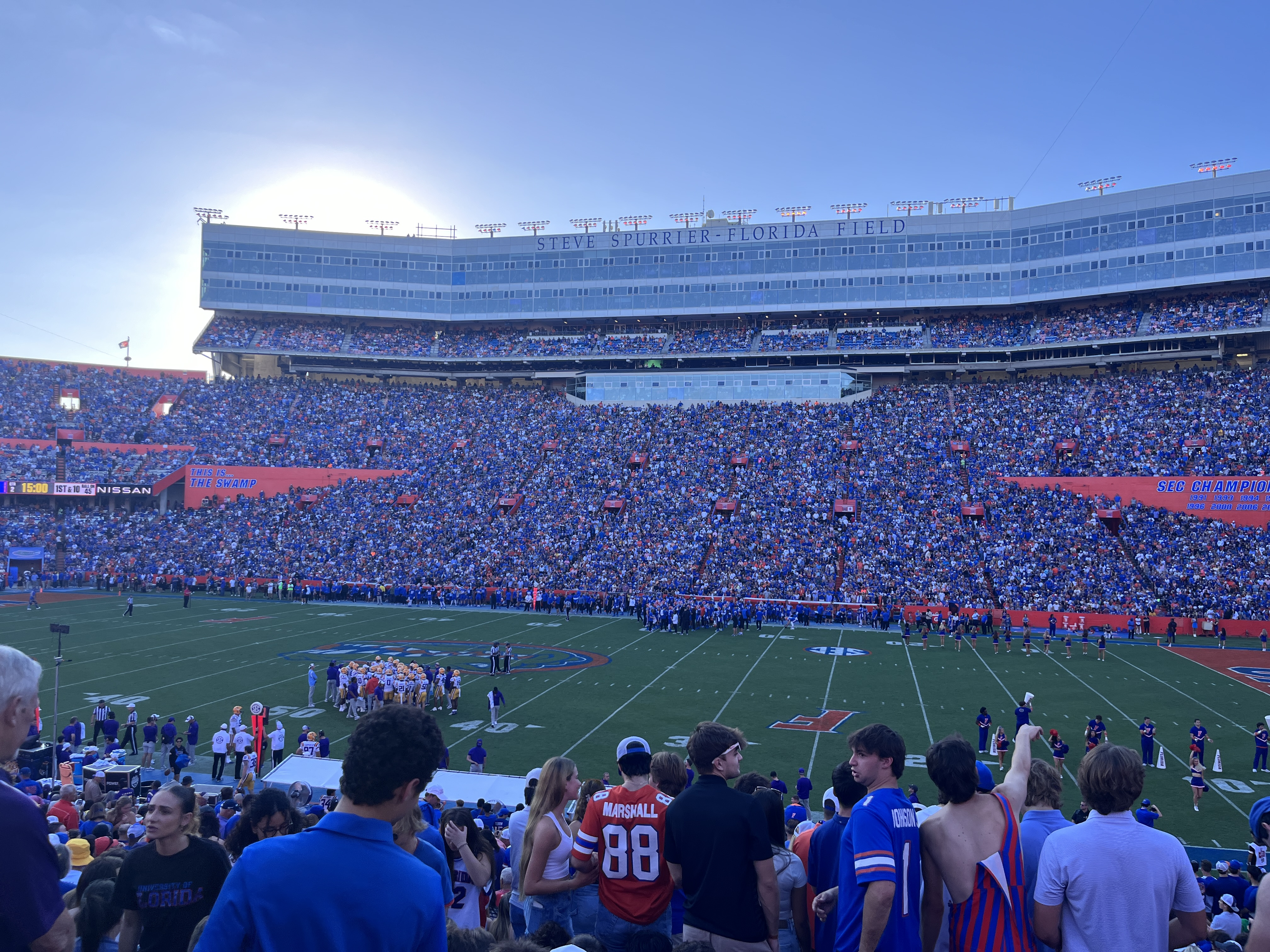
View from inside the stadium during a 2024 game vs LSU

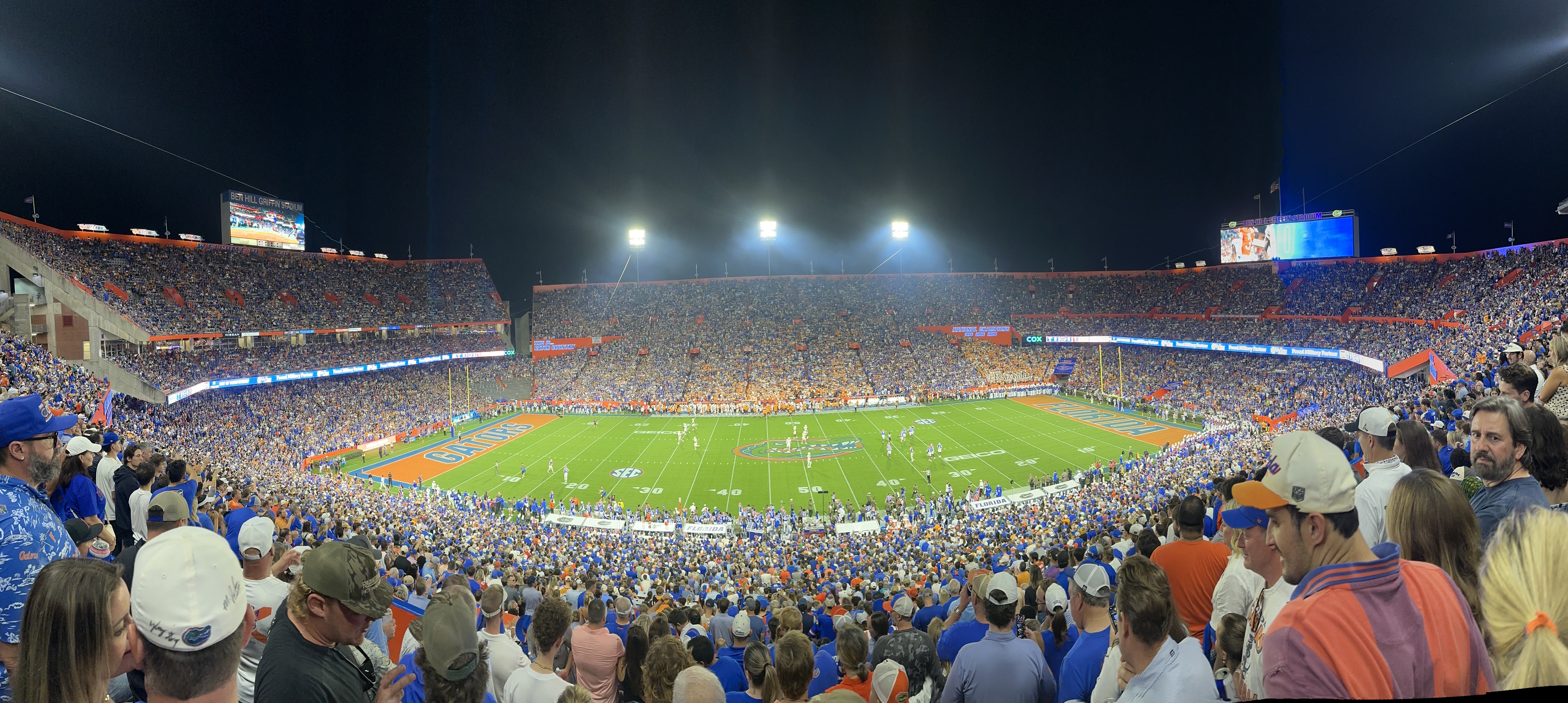
Ben Hill Griffin Stadium prior to a Florida Gators football game against the Tennessee Volunteers in November 2025

== See also ==
- Buildings at the University of Florida
- Florida Gators
- History of the University of Florida
- University Athletic Association
- List of NCAA Division I FBS football stadiums
- Lists of stadiums
- List of stadiums by capacity
- List of U.S. stadiums by capacity
