= The Pride of the Sunshine =

Marching band at University of Florida

The University of Florida Fightin' Gator Marching Band
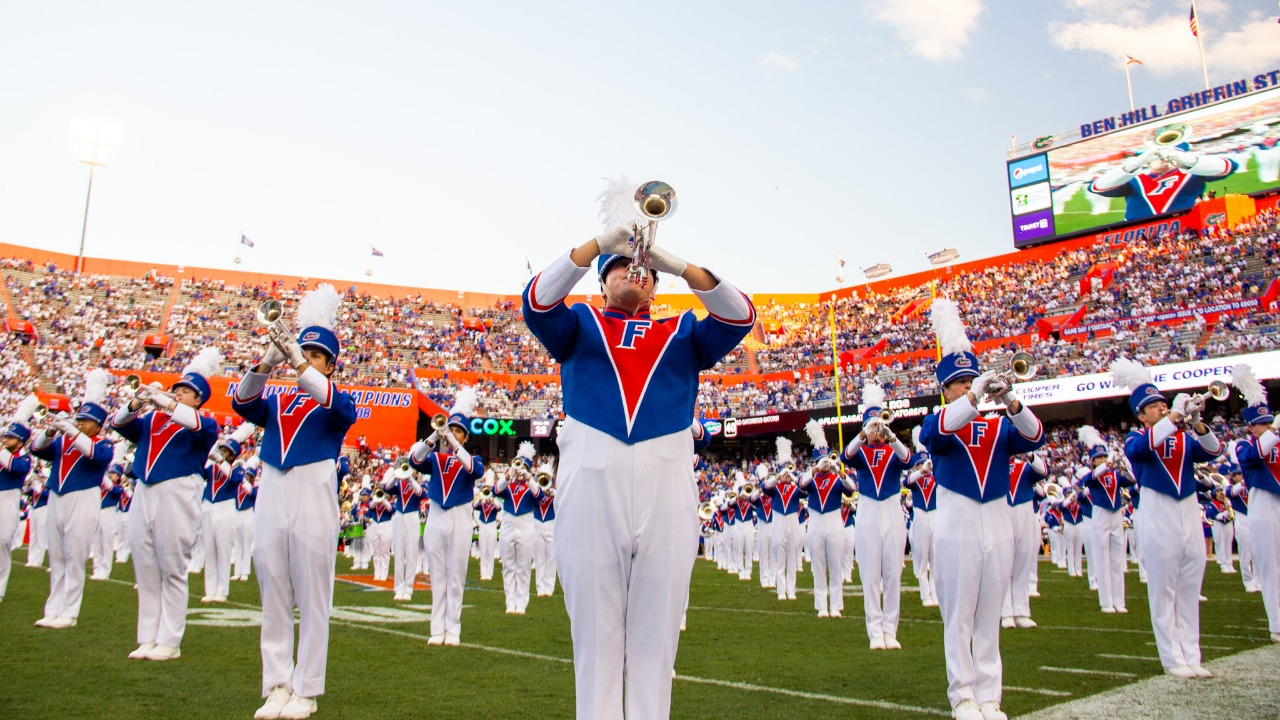
- Nickname: The Sound of the Gator Nation
- School: University of Florida
- Location: Gainesville, Florida
- Conference: SEC
- Founded: 1913
- Director: John M. Watkins Jr.
- Assistant Director: Benjamin Horne
- Members: 450
- Website: https://www.ufbands.com/gatormarchingband

The University of Florida Fightin' Gator Marching Band, also known as The Pride of the Sunshine, is the official marching band for the University of Florida. The current era of the band is also referred to as The Sound of the Gator Nation. They perform at every Florida Gators home football game at Ben Hill Griffin Stadium and also at various other events such as pep rallies, parades, and the annual Orange and Blue spring scrimmage game. A full band usually travels to two away games a year while at other games a small/medium-sized pep band will attend. Members of the Gator Band, as well as other University of Florida students, are encouraged to join other ensembles such as concert band, jazz band, basketball band, and volleyball band. The twirlers for the Gator Band are referred to as the Gatorettes and the color guard is called the Florida Visual Ensemble.

== History ==
=== Founding ===
Prior to the founding of the University of Florida in 1853, the three component institutions that would eventually become the university each had a "cadet band". The band program at UF continued to be cadet style for many years after that. It wasn't until 1913 that the all-student band that would become the Pride of the Sunshine was started by a group of students with a student director named "Pug" Hamilton. It had 16 members and was called "The Cadet Band". The first band office was in Anderson Hall and the first band room was in the Women's Gymnasium.

=== Sophy Mae Mitchell ===
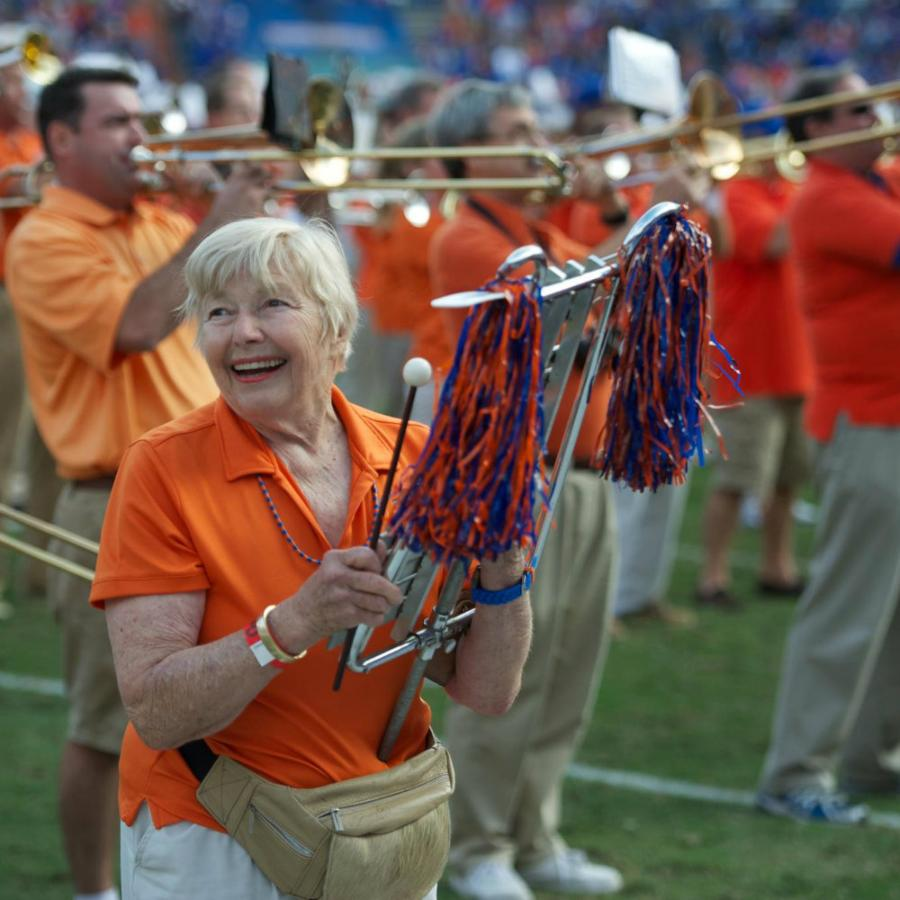
Sophy Mae Mitchell

The first woman in Gator Band was Sophy Mae Mitchell of Sebring, Florida who joined in 1948. Upon her arrival in Gainesville, she met with Colonel Harold B. Bachman and asked his permission to join the marching band. After marching with the banner in her first year in the band, Mitchell was invited back to play the bell lyre for the remainder of her college career. She was a founding member of a club within the Gator Band which would become the Beta Xi chapter of Tau Beta Sigma. In 2009 she was inducted into the Gator Band Hall of Fame. She frequently returned to the Alumni Band games along with over 300 other Gator Band alumni until her death in January 2021.

=== Practice Facilities ===
The Steinbrenner Band Hall at the University of Florida was made possible by a private donation from George Steinbrenner and his wife Joan in 2002 in exchange for naming rights. The facility was completed in 2008 and houses the Stephen Stills Band Rehearsal Room in addition to offices, instrument storage, the band library, and an instrument issue room. The building serves as a practice facility for the university's various concert ensembles as well as the Pride of the Sunshine.

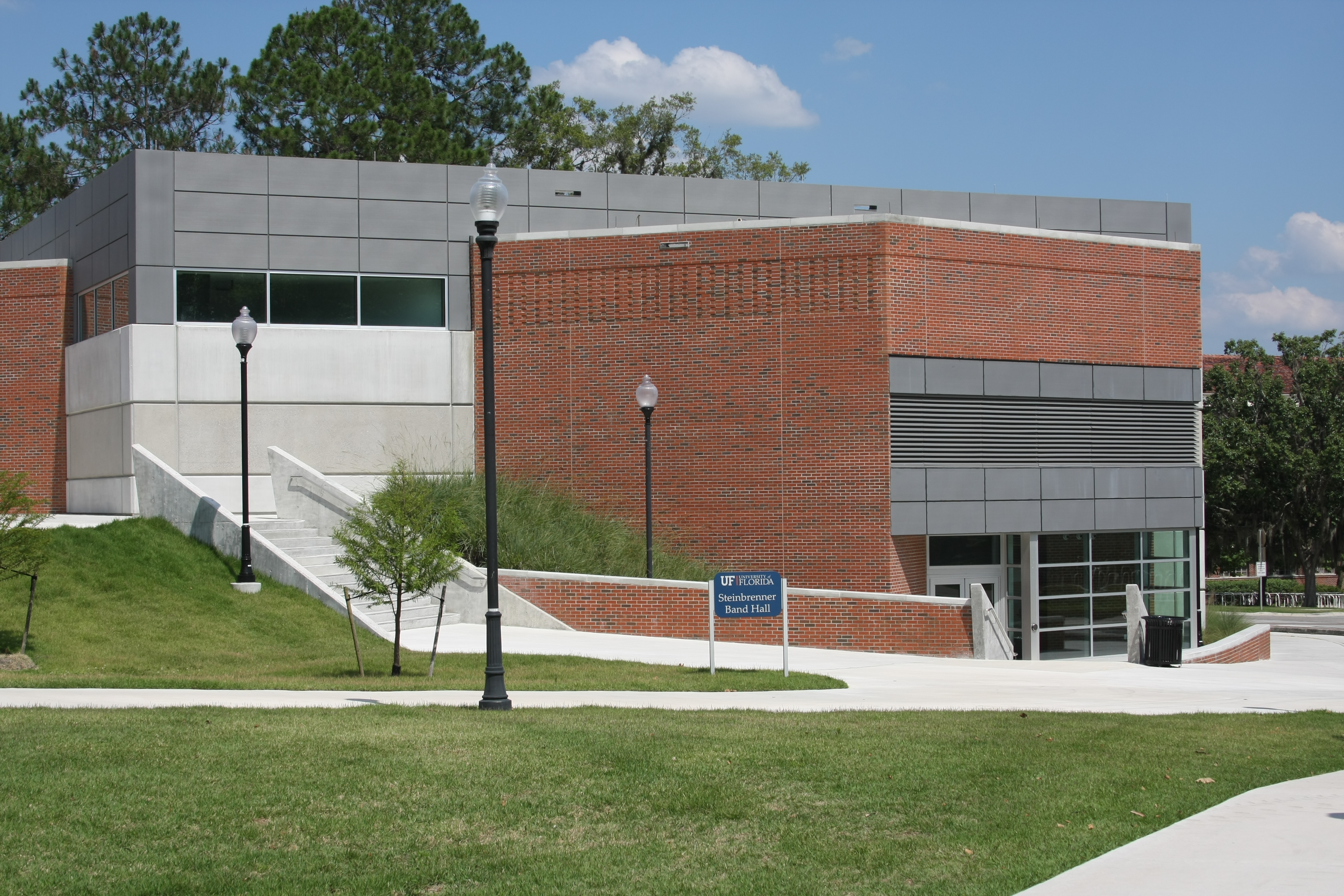
Steinbrenner Band Hall

Gator Marching Band Field was constructed on what was formerly Pony Field at 1273 Gale Lemerand Drive. Prior to the construction of the practice facility, the Gator Marching Band practiced on various fields across the University of Florida campus for over a century. Phase I of construction was completed in August 2018 and encompasses an NCAA-regulated artificial turf field that mirrors the game-day performance space and is built with proper drainage and adequate lighting as well as a 5,000-square-foot outdoor pavilion that provides shelter from Florida's inclement weather. Phase II of the project, which will begin construction once funding is secured, includes a research and teaching building with workrooms, instrument storage space, an ice machine, and restrooms.

=== Honors and Significant Performances ===
In 1972 the Gator Band was featured at the opening of Walt Disney World in Orlando, Florida. In 1997 they returned to participate in the Walt Disney World 25th Anniversary Celebration.

In 2012, the Gator Band was invited to perform at the 2012 Summer Olympics in London, becoming the first non-British marching band to perform outside of Buckingham Palace.

In 2013, the Gator Band was selected as the recipient of the Sudler Trophy, a one-time award conferred upon the nation's best college marching bands, by the John Philip Sousa Foundation. They received the award on November 9, 2013, during the homecoming halftime show.

In 2017, the Gator Band was featured in an episode of America's Got Talent. They filmed the footage in Ben Griffin Stadium during January before the start of spring classes. Their segment ended up being the episode's introduction.

In 2023, the Gator Band travelled to Ireland for multiple performances in celebration of St. Patrick's Day. They performed at the Cork St. Patrick's Day Parade, in exhibition at the Limerick International Band Championship, and put on a standstill performance in Dublin at Merrion Square.

In 2024, the Gator Band travelled to France for multiple performances commemorating the 80th Anniversary of the D-Day landings. The band participated in a wreath laying ceremony and performance at the Normandy American Cemetery in addition to performances at the Coudehard-Montormel Memorial and the Basilique du Sacré-Cœur de Montmartre. A parade performance along Omaha Beach was scheduled but missed due to the band being caught within the security apparatus surrounding the travel of then-President Joe Biden.

=== Controversy ===
In August 2019, Gator Band Director Jay Watkins was assaulted after a neutral-site 24–20 victory over the University of Miami football team. The Gator Marching Band was leaving Camping World Stadium in parade formation when a Hurricanes fan attempted to cut through the block. Watkins reached out his hand to block the woman from doing so after which an unidentified man came up behind him, put him in a choke hold, and threw him into the pavement. No charges were filed, but the incident sparked a national conversation regarding the safety of marching bands in away and neutral-site environments.

In June 2020, university president Kent Fuchs announced that the University Athletic Association and the Gator Band would cease the use of the "Gator Bait" cheer at UF sporting events.

=== Director of Bands ===
- 1st Director: "Pug" Hamilton
- 1st Paid: R. Dewitt Brown (1920–1948)
- 2nd Paid: Col. Harold B. Bachman (1948–1958)
- 3rd Paid: Reid Poole (1958–1961)
- 4th Paid: Richard Bowles (1961–1973)
- 5th Paid: Frank Wickes (1973–1980)
  - Assistant Director: Gary Langford (1971–1985)
- 6th Paid: David Gregory (1980–1982)
- 7th Paid: Gerald Poe (1982–1985)
- 8th Paid: Gary Langford (1985–1987)
- 9th Paid: Dr. David A. Waybright (1987–2025)
  - Associate Director of Bands: Gary Langford (1985–1996)
  - Assistant Director of Bands: Mark Spede (1990–1996)
  - Associate Director of Bands: René Rosas (1995–1998)
  - Associate Director of Bands: Matthew Sexton (1998–2006)
  - Associate Director of Bands: John M. "Jay" Watkins Jr. (2006–present)
- 10th Paid: Archie G. "Chip" Birkner, IV (2026–present)

== Leadership ==
=== John M. "Jay" Watkins Jr. – Associate Director of Bands ===
John "Jay" Watkins Jr. is the associate director of bands and director of the Gator Marching Band at the University of Florida. Watkins was hired in 2006 from the University of Texas at Austin where he served as the assistant to the director of bands and the assistant director of the Longhorn Band. Prior to his work in music education, he worked for the US Naval Research Laboratory as a research associate in the areas of liquid fuel propellants and their stability and published over 75 articles in refereed science journals.

=== Archie G. "Chip" Birkner, IV – Director of Bands ===
Dr. Chip Birkner was appointed director of bands at the University of Florida in 2026. He additionally serves the UF School of Music as an associate professor of music as well as director of University Concert Bands, associate conductor of the Wind Symphony, and music director of the New Music Ensemble. Prior to his appointment as director of bands, Birkner spent two decades as assistant director of the Gator Marching Band, brought on alongside Jay Watkins in 2006. Birkner is a "Triple Gator" having received his bachelor of music education with performer's certificate, master of music in percussion performance, and Ph.D. in music education and instrumental conducting from the University of Florida.

=== Robert Gary Langford – Professor Emeritus ===
While no longer under the employ of the University of Florida, professor emeritus Gary Langford served as director of the Gator Marching Band from 1985 to 1996. He remains active with the Pride of the Sunshine, returning every homecoming to conduct the current band and the Gator Alumni Band in the homecoming halftime show. Over his tenure as director, Langford arranged over 400 classic tunes that have become synonymous with the ensemble. He also formed numerous long-lasting relationships with Gator Band alumni who return to Steve Spurrier Florida Field every year for homecoming. Langford once bailed out two sousaphone players from jail the night before the 1987 game against Louisiana State University after they were arrested for attempting to steal an Interstate-10 sign.

== Game-day Traditions ==
=== Game-day Rehearsal ===
On Saturday mornings when there is a home football game in Gainesville, the Gator Band holds a 7:00 AM rehearsal at Gator Band Practice Field. There they will rehearse the pregame show, halftime show, and various songs that may be called up in the stands. The uniform for such rehearsals usually consists of the Gator Band shako, a white, orange, or blue Gator Band shirt, royal blue shorts, white socks, and white marching shoes. At the conclusion of all home game-day rehearsals, the Pride of the Sunshine forms their concert arcs, links hands, and sings the University of Florida's alma mater in four-part harmony. During the last home game of the season (usually the Sunshine Showdown game against the Florida State University Seminoles) graduating members are invited to the front sideline of the practice field where they will link hands and face the rest of the band for one final time singing their alma mater as a member of the marching band.

Pride of the Sunshine sings the Alma Mater

=== Gator Walk ===
Prior to their game-day march to the stadium, the Gator Band sends two groups of musicians to Gator Walk Village, a collection of 20 or so tailgating tents on the North Lawn between Ben Hill Griffin Stadium and University Avenue, where they play for the Florida Gators football team as they enter the stadium. The band provides entertainment for tailgating fans as well as support for the team as they prepare for the upcoming football game.

=== Around the Gator & FLA.P.S. ===
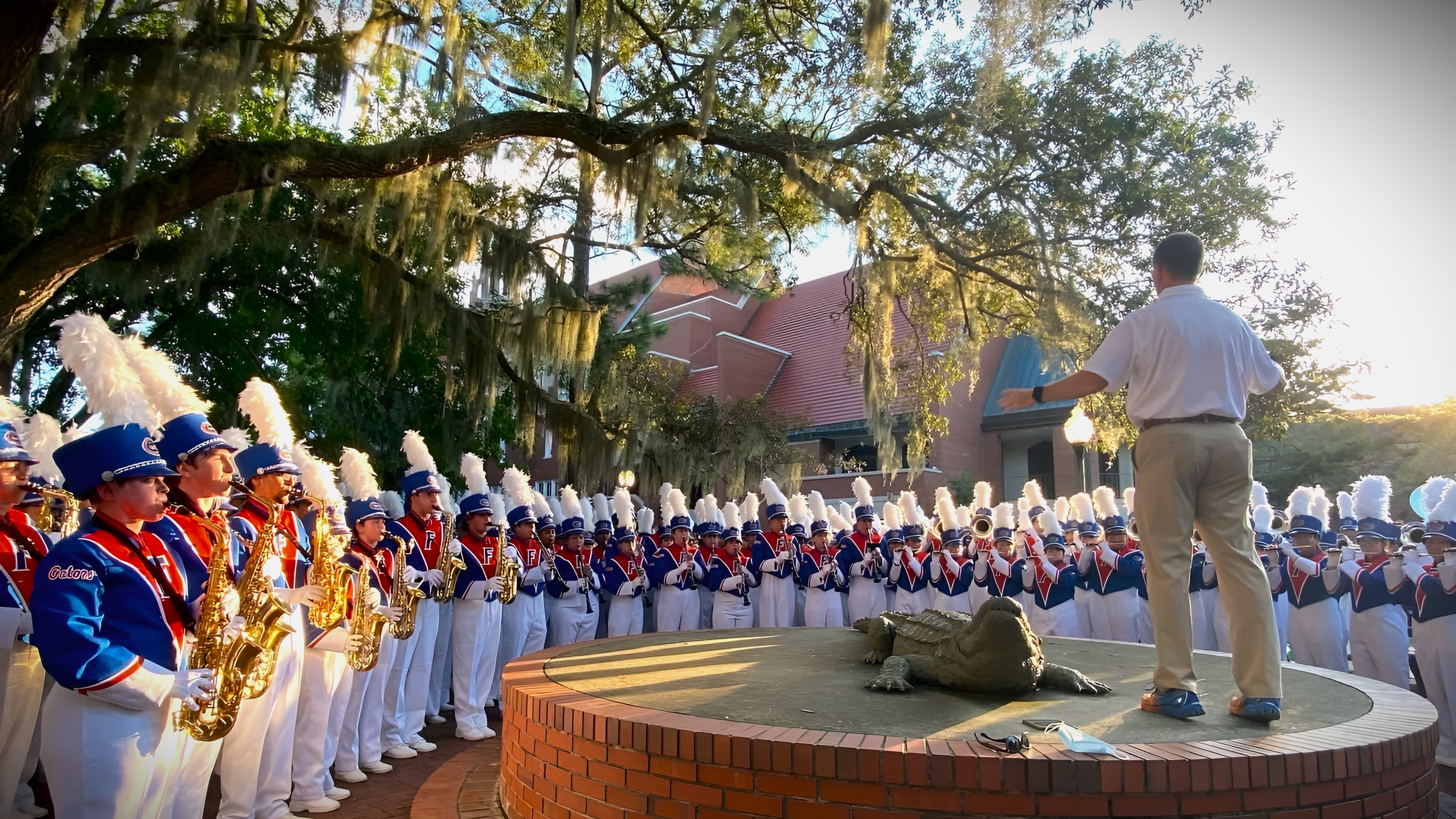
Around the Gator

After the Gator Walk groups return to the Music Building and all sections have warmed up on their own, the full band encircles the alligator statue outside of the University Auditorium. From there, Professor Watkins will lead the band through various songs (usually the Star-Spangled Banner and Alma Mater) as a way to refocus the group before they depart for the stadium. After being dismissed, the band forms the pregame parade block facing west on Union Road in order to begin their march to Ben Hill Griffin Stadium. From there, the band along with Big Boom and a police motorcycle escort will march to the tune of various drum cadences that form the Florida Parade Sequence or FLA.P.S. The group will march up Union Road, make a left on Buckman Drive, and descend the ramp into the loading dock of the stadium.

=== Pregame ===
As soon as the field is clear the band marches into the Swamp from the visitors tunnel in a pregame block. They take the field opening to the "Gator Chomp", while the Voice of the Gator Band, Gerre Reynolds, announces their entrance.

Arriving at the fanfare block the band plays the "Go Gators!" call, the fanfare, and takes the fight song ("The Orange and Blue") down the field. During the break strain of the fight song, the band forms the block "F." Starting the trio of "Men of Florida" march, they move into their ceremonial set, the outline of the state of Florida. From the ceremonial set, the crowd is invited to recite the "Pledge of Allegiance" which is followed by the playing of "The Star-Spangled Banner" and the University of Florida's alma mater.

Finishing the alma mater, the band plays "We Are the Boys March" to enter into the Gators spell-out preset. Next, they play "Gimme a 'G'" while they spell out the word "Gators." Then they play "The Orange and Blue" to take the script "Gators" down the field toward the tunnel from which the team enters. At the end of "The Orange and Blue" the band plays "You Are My Sunshine" while forming the block "UF" form that the football team runs through for their entrance. The band then plays "Let's Go Gators" twice then puts instruments down for videos that air before the team runs out. The band plays "The Orange and Blue" once while the team runs into the stadium and again when exiting the field.

Pride of the Sunshine entrance for Pregame

=== In the Stands ===
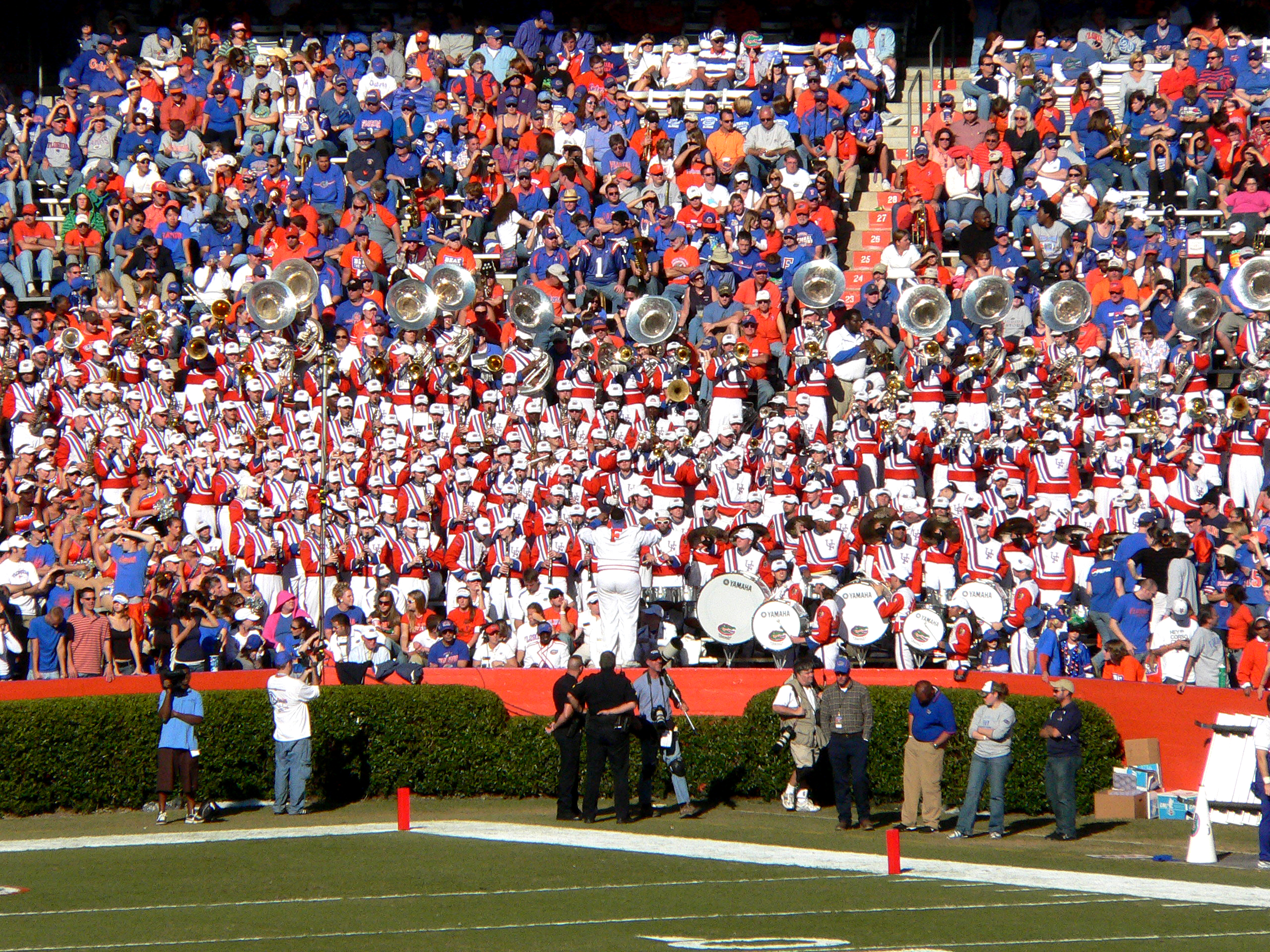
The Pride of the Sunshine performing during a game at The Swamp

In the stands, the band plays a large number of school songs, many of them variations of the Jaws theme. The band plays "Gator Chomp" and "Gator Maximus" at various points in the game while the team is on defense, and "Let's Go Gators", "Orange and Blue First Down", and "Go Gators" while the team is on offense, among other various songs. Songs like "You Can Call Me Al" and "Hey! Baby" are crowd favorites.

Perhaps the best-known tradition of the Gator Band is the playing of "We Are the Boys from Old Florida" at the conclusion of every third quarter. Beginning with a short intro, the band sets the whole crowd into a swaying motion starting with the first words. Following the playing of "We Are the Boys of Old Florida", the song "I Won't Back Down" by Gainesville native Tom Petty plays over the stadium loudspeakers while the crowd joins in as a tribute to Petty's career and devotion to the University of Florida.

We Are the Boys from Old Florida and I Won't Back Down

=== End of the Game ===
One of the newest traditions was started by Florida head coach Urban Meyer in 2005. After every game, the head coach and team will walk over to the band's section of the stadium and sing the alma mater after which the head coach shakes the band director's hand. Should the Gators win, the band will strike up "Orange and Blue" and sing the fight song with the team, fans, and spirit team. This tradition was continued by Will Muschamp and Dan Mullen.

Alma Mater and Orange and Blue

== Alumni Band ==
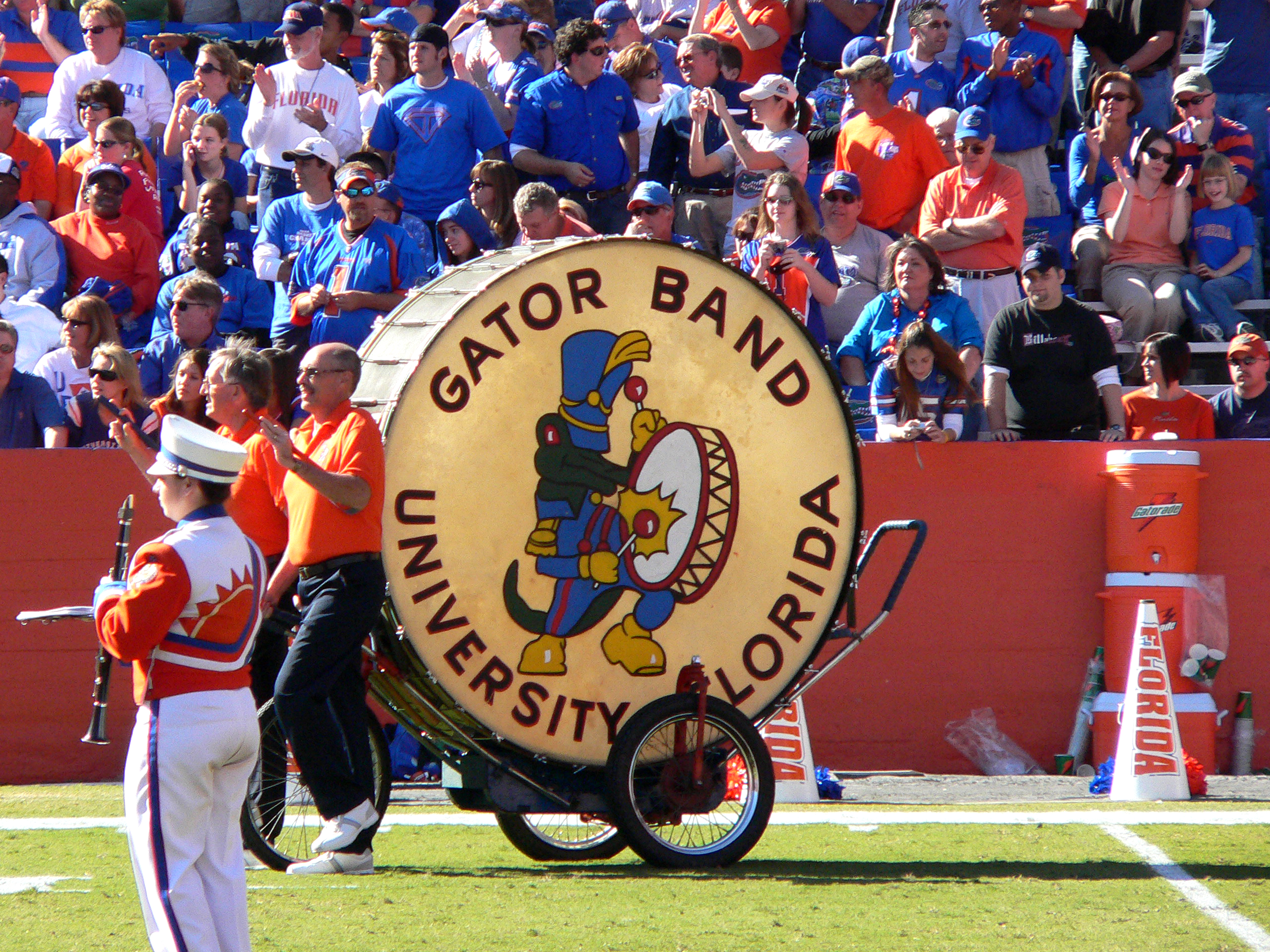
The Pride of the Sunshine Alumni Band "Biggest Boom in Dixie" drum and crew during their 2007 show

=== Gator Alumni Band ===
The Gator Alumni Band performs during halftime of the homecoming game each year. It consists of a volunteer group of former members of the Pride of the Sunshine. The alumni band is best known for the "Biggest Boom in Dixie", a very large bass drum that is carted onto the field during the show. At some games, mascots Albert and Alberta have played the drum as well.

=== The Biggest Boom in Dixie ===
In 1953, band director Colonel Harold Bachman contacted the William F. Ludwig Company of Chicago and asked them to design the largest practical drum ever made. With drumheads made from kip and measuring 6 feet in diameter and 22 inches in width, the cost for its construction, carriage and waterproof cover, was $900. (Around $10,000 in today's money.) The drum's status as the largest ever made was inevitably contested however Bachman simply said the University of Florida had the drum with "the biggest boom in Dixie" which gave the drum its name. While once a musical staple of the Pride of the Sunshine the large bass drum is now mostly ornamental, as large bass drums fell out of style with modern-day marching bands for being too difficult to maneuver and travel with. Presently, the drum is simply referred to as "Big Boom" and is carted out for pregame shows and parades. When not in use it is stored in the University Auditorium. During UF's homecoming parade, attendees can strike the drum in return for a pin featuring the cartoon Gator Band logo.

== Support Organizations ==
=== Kappa Kappa Psi ===
The Alpha Eta chapter of Kappa Kappa Psi has been providing service to the University of Florida band programs since May 25, 1931. It was the 31st chapter in the nation, and the first in Florida. The chapter is sponsored by former Kappa Kappa Psi National President Scott E. Stowell. The Alpha Eta chapter engages in a variety of service-based responsibilities including issuing and organizing band uniforms as well as distributing Gatorade on game days. It is also responsible for hosting the annual Gator Band 5K. Since its installation, the Alpha Eta chapter has initiated over 1,000 members into the organization.

=== Tau Beta Sigma ===
The Beta Xi chapter of Tau Beta Sigma has been providing service to the University of Florida band programs since April 12, 1958 when it became the 62nd chapter of the sorority. Among their other responsibilities, they are responsible for handing out post-performance snacks after the halftime performance at football games. Hundreds of sisters have served with the Beta Xi chapter, including men since the spring of 2004. The sisters of Beta Xi have also extended an honorary invitation to dozens of outstanding individuals of the Gator Band, including previous directors and graduate students. In 1999, the chapter initiated Sophy Mae Mitchell, one of the first women to join the Pride of the Sunshine and a founding member of the club which later became the Beta Xi chapter.

== See also ==
- University of Florida
- Florida Gators
