= USCGC Alligator =

United States Coast Guard patrol boat

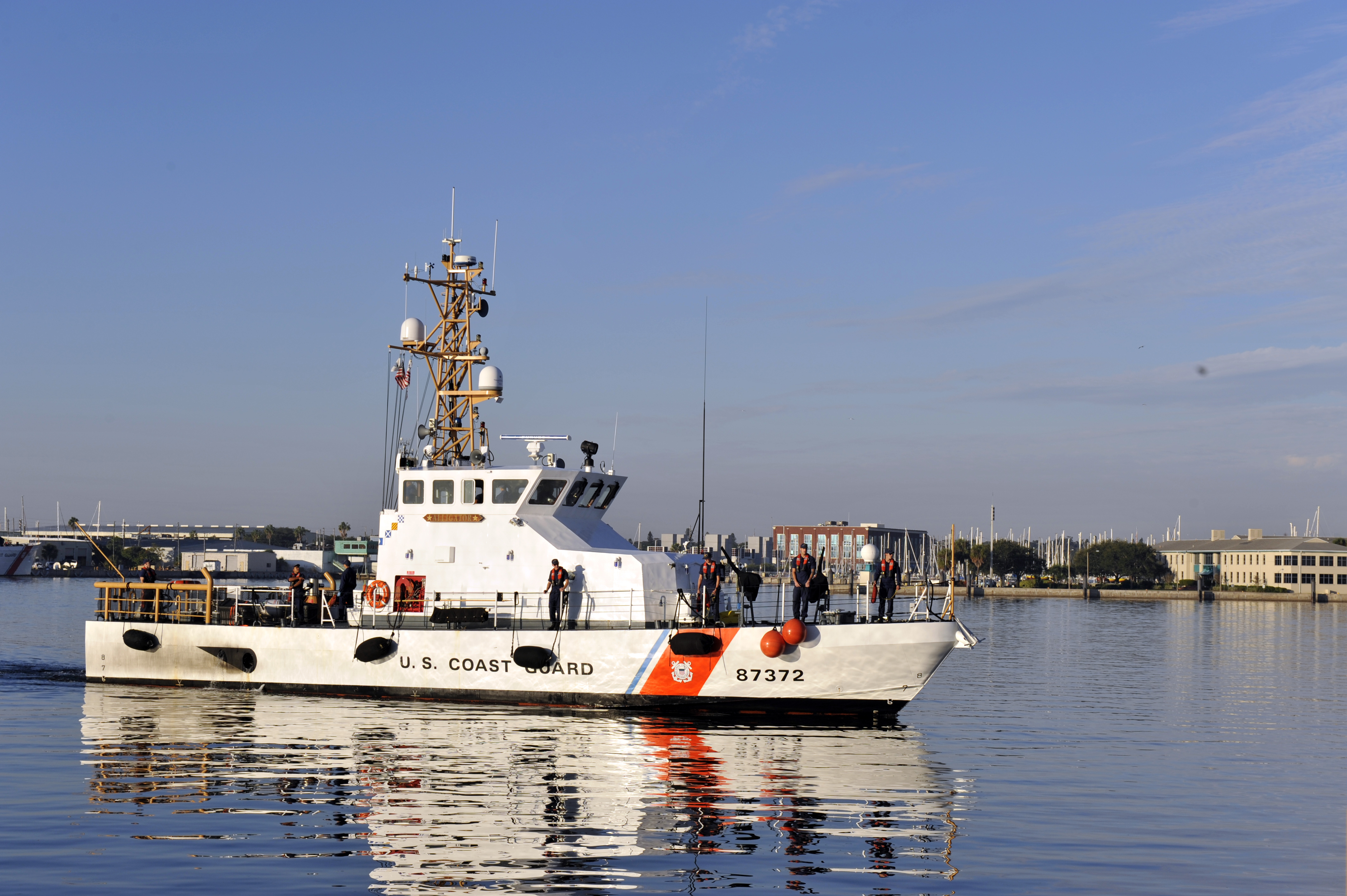
- Alligator's crew during a drug offload at Sector St. Petersburg in November 2014

History

United States
- Name: Alligator
- Namesake: Alligator
- Operator: United States Coast Guard
- Builder: Bollinger Shipyards, Lockport, Louisiana
- Sponsored by: Patricia Mica
- Commissioned: March 9, 2009
- Home port: St. Petersburg, Florida
- Identification: Hull number: WPB-87372
- Status: In active service

General characteristics
- Class & type: Marine Protector-class patrol boat
- Length: 87 ft (27 m)
- Complement: 11 (2009)

USCGC Alligator (WPB-87372) is an 87-foot (27 m) Marine Protector-class patrol boat of the United States Coast Guard, based at Coast Guard Sector St. Petersburg in St. Petersburg, Florida. Commissioned in March 2009, it patrols the west coast of Florida as well as the Gulf of Mexico. Its missions include search and rescue, law enforcement, drug and migrant interdiction, marine environmental protection and homeland security. It is the fifth commissioned U.S. vessel to bear the name Alligator and was ceremonially adopted by the University of Florida Gators.

== Design ==
Alligator is one of the Marine Protector-class coastal patrol boats built for the Coast Guard by Bollinger Shipyards of Lockport, Louisiana, under a contract first awarded on March 13, 1996. It was one of the last boats of the class. The final boat, Sea Fox (WPB-87374), was delivered in May 2009 and completed the contract. The class replaced the older 82-foot Point-class cutters.

== Service history ==
Alligator was commissioned at a ceremony at Coast Guard Sector St. Petersburg on March 9, 2009. The keynote speaker was U.S. Representative John Mica, a University of Florida graduate and the Republican leader of the House Committee on Transportation and Infrastructure. His wife, Patricia Mica, was the cutter's sponsor. Rear Admiral Steve Branham, commander of the Seventh Coast Guard District and an executive of Bollinger Shipyards also attended. Mica called the cutter "a welcome asset for Sector St. Petersburg, one of the Coast Guard's busiest and most active commands".

As part of the University of Florida's adoption, the cutter's flag box carries a Gator graphic. More than two dozen UF alumni attended the ceremony, along with the mascots Albert and Alberta. The adoption was at no cost to the university. Lieutenant (junior grade) Andrew Vicks was the first commanding officer. Alligator joined the patrol boats Nantucket, Ocracoke and Crocodile in the Sector St. Petersburg fleet.

=== Deepwater Horizon oil spill ===
In June 2010 Alligator was one of many Coast Guard vessels sent to the Gulf of Mexico in response to the Deepwater Horizon oil spill.

=== Operations ===
On November 13, 2014, Alligator's crew offloaded seized drugs at Sector St. Petersburg. On January 31, 2015, the cutter patrolled Tampa's annual Gasparilla parade, working with the Coast Guard Auxiliary, the Florida Fish and Wildlife Conservation Commission and local police to keep the waterway safe.

On February 11, 2015, the 45-foot (14 m) commercial fishing vessel Christie Sea broke down about 98 miles (158 km) northwest of Tampa Bay while towing another fishing vessel, the Shamrock. An engineer from Alligator tried to repair the disabled boat, and the cutter then towed both vessels in tandem.

On the evening of November 12, 2015, a passenger went overboard from the cruise ship Norwegian Pearl in the Yucatán Channel, about 22 nautical miles off the coast of Cuba. The ship had been chartered for an electronic dance music festival. Alligator and a C-130 aircrew from Air Station Clearwater took part in the search. The search was suspended on November 14 after more than 600 square nautical miles had been covered, with no sign of the woman.

== See also ==
- List of United States Coast Guard cutters
