= The Orange and Blue =

Fight song at the University of Florida

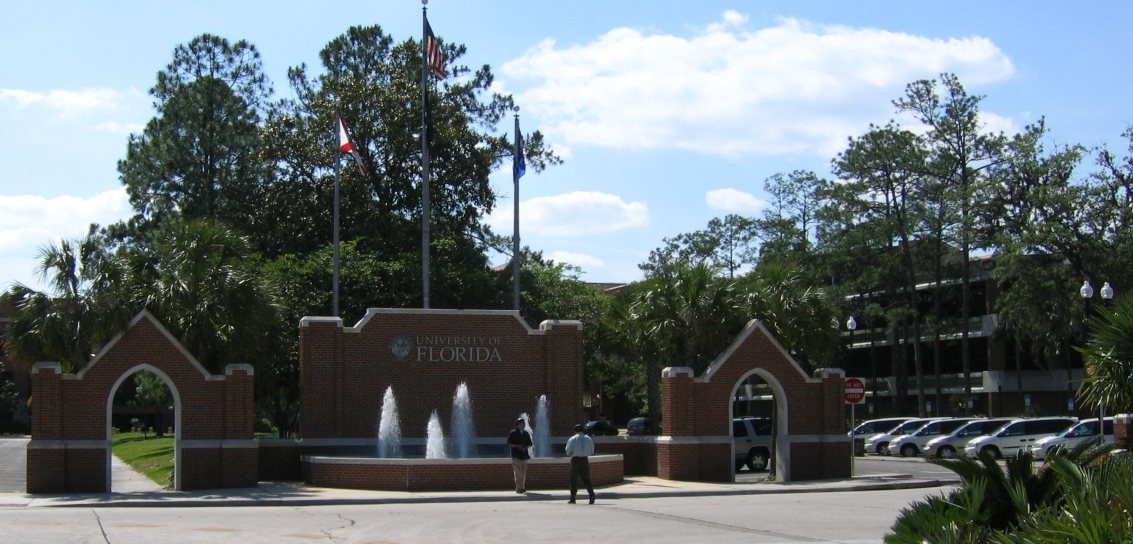
Entrance monument and water fountain located at the main S.W. Thirteenth Street entrance of the University of Florida campus in Gainesville, Florida.

"The Orange and Blue" is the traditional fight song of the Florida Gators intercollegiate sports teams of the University of Florida in Gainesville, Florida.

== History of the lyrics and score ==
The author of the lyrics and original music of "The Orange and Blue" is uncertain, but published examples of the University of Florida's songs and yells which include the lyrics date to at least the 1916–17 school year. Sheet music for the song was published in 1925 which listed George Hamilton as the author. Thornton W. Allen, a prolific compiler, composer and arranger of American university alma maters and college football fight songs, arranged a version of the musical score in 1935, with "Words by George Hamilton." The present music for the song, as played at University of Florida events, was arranged by the university's former director of bands, Richard W. Bowles, in 1964. Bowles served as the assistant university band director from 1958 to 1961, the director from 1961 to 1975, and continued to teach at the university until his retirement in 1985.

The musical arrangement that is often played during football and basketball games as well as other Florida Gators athletic contests to rally fans and show support for the university's athletic teams is actually only the song's chorus. "The Orange and Blue" in its original presentation contained a first verse that sang of the university's bravery and "Dixie's" pride in the Gators along with the well-known chorus, however, The Pride of the Sunshine marching band and the university's other pep bands never play any part of the song other than the chorus and a break strain found in the "pregame" version of the song.

== Lyrics ==
On, brave old Florida, just keep on marching on your way!
On, brave old Florida, and we will cheer you on your play!
And as you march along, we'll sing a victory song anew;
With all your might,
Go on and fight Gators, fight!
For Dixie's rightly proud of you.

[Chorus]

So give a cheer for the Orange and Blue
Waving Forever!
Forever pride of Old Florida,
May she droop never.
We’ll sing a song for the flag today,
Cheer for the team at play!
On to the goal,
We’ll fight our way for
Flor-i-da!

Go Gators!

== See also ==
- The Pride of the Sunshine
- Florida Gators
- History of the University of Florida
- We Are the Boys from Old Florida
