= We Are the Boys from Old Florida =

Song used in university of Florida sports matches

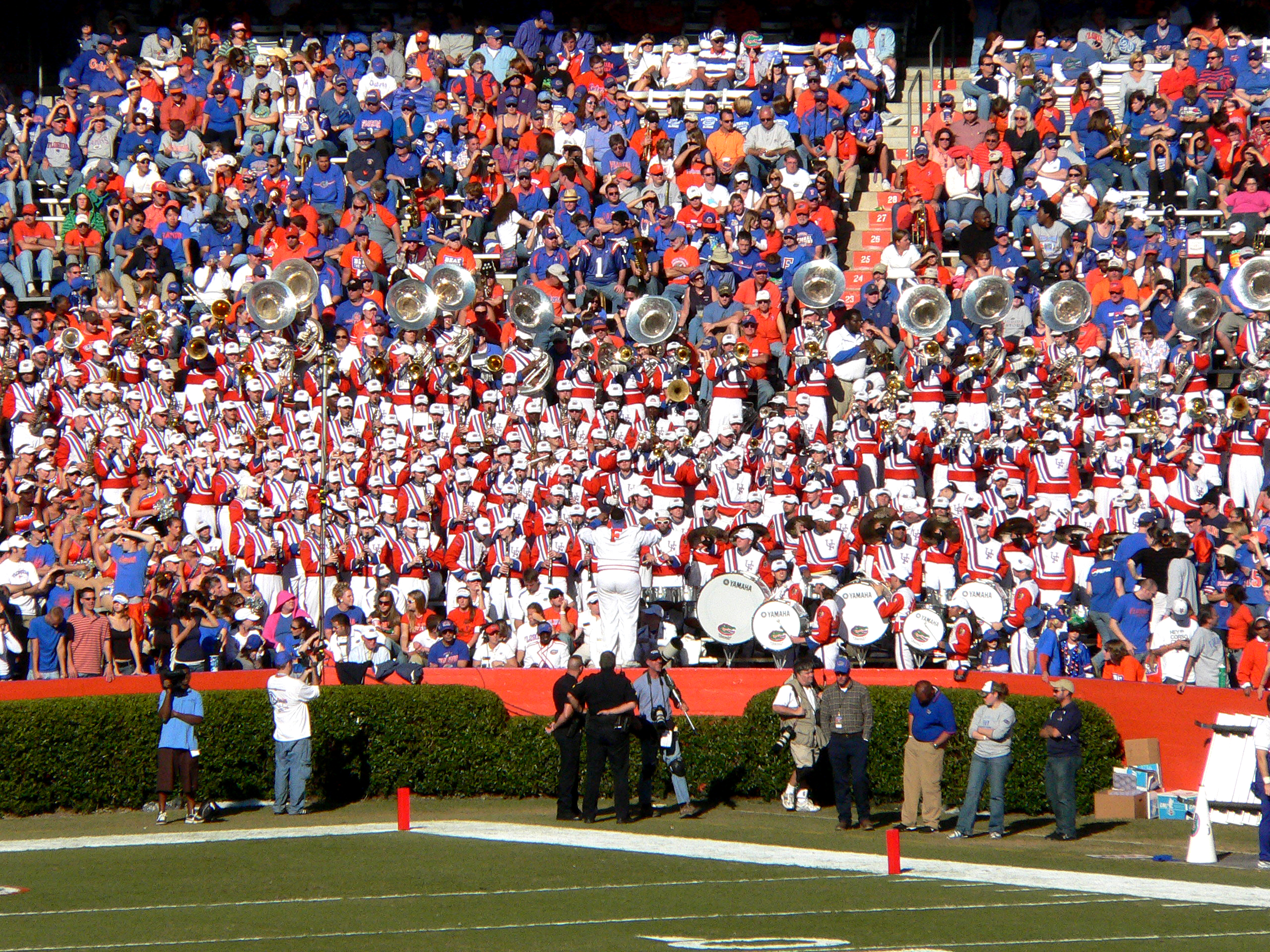
The Pride of the Sunshine

"We Are the Boys from Old Florida" is a song commonly played and sung during University of Florida (UF) sporting events, most notably at the end of the third quarter at football games by The Pride of the Sunshine, the school's marching band. It is very similar to other school songs sung by several other colleges and schools around the United States, and its origin and original composer is unknown. At Florida, it has been popular since the 1920s.

== History ==
"We Are the Boys From Old Florida" has been associated with the University of Florida since the 1920s. However, several other schools and universities across the United States—including the University of Chicago, the University of Nebraska–Lincoln, and the Toledo, Ohio public school system— sing very similar waltz-time tunes, often with very similar lyrics.

In Gainesville, Florida, the song has been attributed to Robert Swanson and John Icenhour, two University of Florida students who supposedly debuted the tune in 1919 with their barbershop quartet and dance band. A collection of University of Florida pep songs from 1941, on the other hand, attributes "We Are the Boys" to Thorton W. Allen, a prolific composer and arranger of marching band music in the early 20th century. However, the University of Nebraska–Lincoln has long performed a very similar school song called "Dear Old Nebraska U", which school records say was composed by Harry Pecha in 1924. And in Toledo, Ohio, another very similar song called "We're Strong for Toledo" has been taught to public school students since the early 1900s, with a 1953 obituary for a local man named Joseph Murphy stating that he wrote the tune and lyrics in 1906. As former University of Florida music director Harold Bachman wrote in a published history of the school's band, "No one seems to know for sure who composed 'We Are the Boys From Old Florida'." And although the University of Florida owns the rights to its band arrangement of the song, the tune and lyrics are in the public domain.

Whatever its origins and whoever initially composed it, "We Are the Boys" has been a popular pep song with UF students and fans since the 1920s, and since the 1930s, it has been played at Florida Gators football games by The Pride of the Sunshine (the school's marching band) while students lock arms, sway, and sing the lyrics. It was once played at random times during breaks in game action, which limited fan participation since they were not prepared to sing. In the early 1970s, the band began playing the song exclusively at the end of the third quarter, allowing every fan in attendance at Gator home games to stand, sway, and sing along. Pep bands at other UF sporting events also play the song, often at a similar time frame - a break in the action well into the contest. Since the early 1990s, a fast march arrangement which does not involve audience participation has joined the UF band repertoire.

The University of Florida has been co-educational since the 1940s, and there have been several attempts to update the lyrics of "We Are the Boys" to reflect the school's many female students. However, while the alma mater and many traditions dating from the school's male-only period have been updated over the years, "We Are the Boys" has remained unchanged.

== Performance ==
Traditionally, Gator fans lock arms and sway back and forth on the first beat of every measure during the waltz-time song. A shouted "Hey!" is added to the end of the first stanza and a shouted "Go Gators!" is inserted after the line "Down where the old Gators play." During the line "we'll all stick together," the word "together" is drawn out for two or three seconds while everyone holds their lean. At Gator football games, the school song is immediately followed by a stadium sing-along to Tom Petty's song I Won't Back Down, a tradition which began soon after the Gainesville native's unexpected death in October 2017.

== Lyrics ==
We are the boys from old Florida,
F-L-O-R-I-D-A.
Where the girls are the fairest,
The boys are the squarest
Of any old state down our way. (Hey!)
We are all strong for old Florida
Down where the old Gators play. (Go Gators!)
In all kinds of weather...
We'll all stick together...
For F-L-O-R-I-D-A.

== See also ==
- The Pride of the Sunshine
- Florida Gators
- History of the University of Florida
- The Orange and Blue
