= Albert and Alberta Gator =

Sports mascots

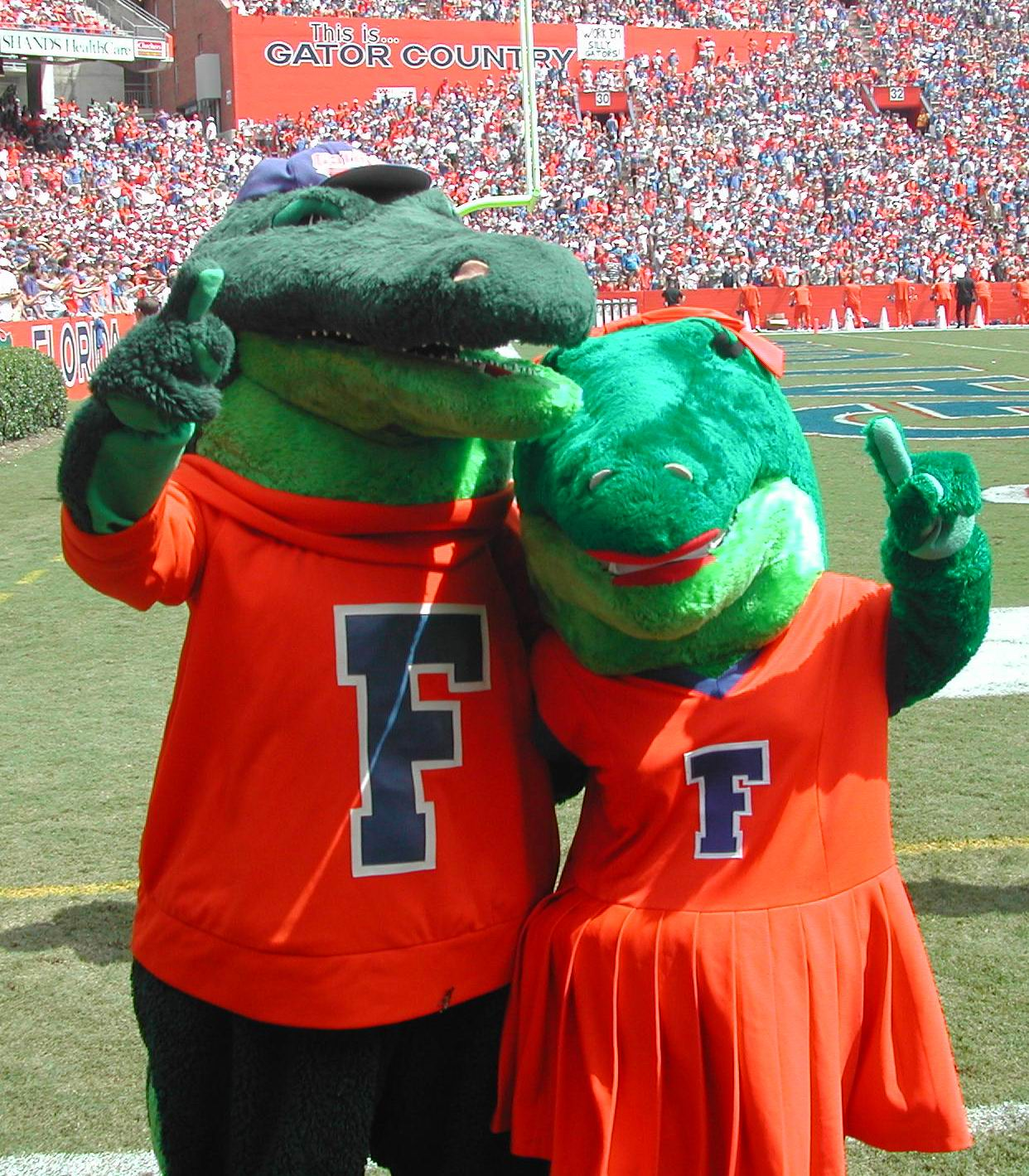
- Albert (left), and Alberta (right), mascots of the Florida Gators, before their 2015 redesign.
- University: University of Florida
- Conference: SEC
- Description: Anthropomorphic American alligators
- First seen: 1970 (Albert), 1984 (Alberta)

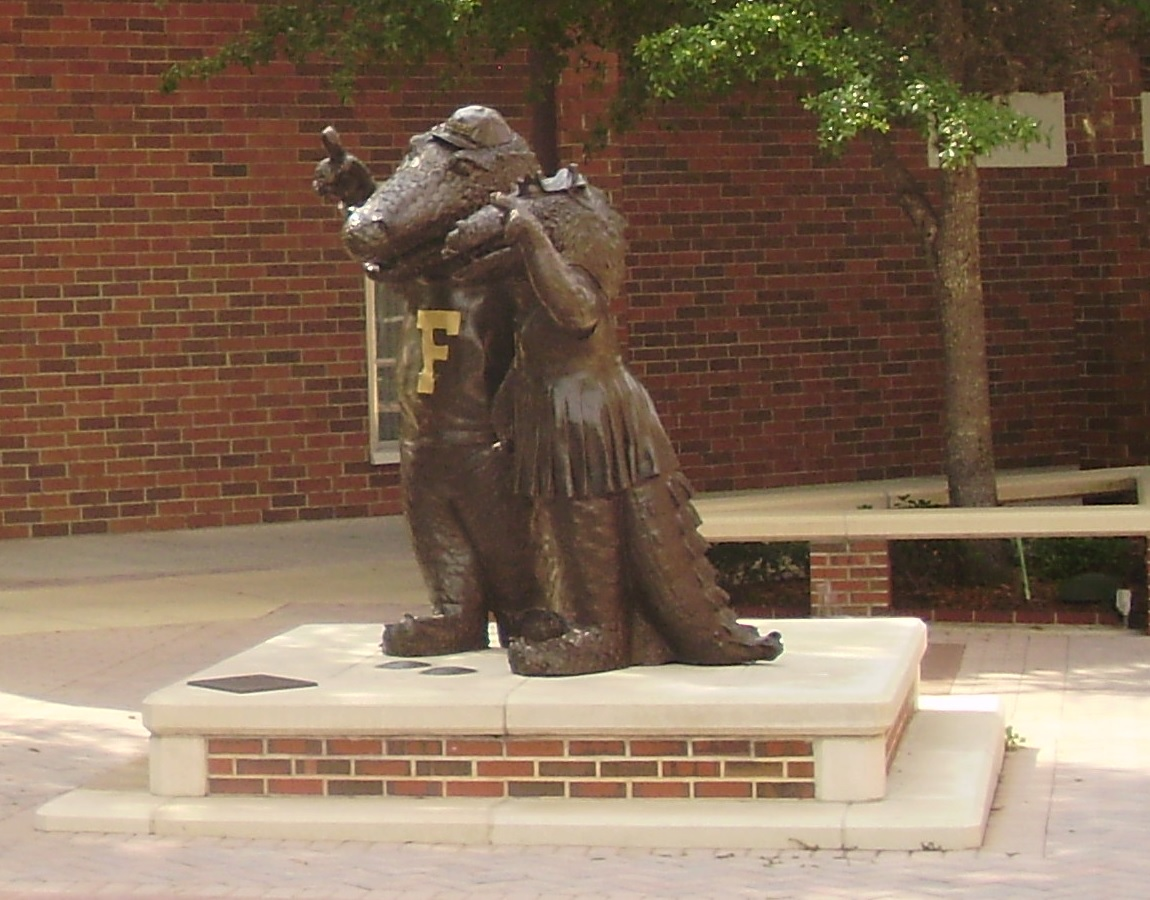
Statues at the Alumni Affairs Building

Albert Gator and Alberta Gator are the official mascots of the University of Florida in Gainesville, Florida. Costumed in plush, Albert and Alberta are Florida representations of American alligators, which are commonly found throughout the state of Florida.

== History ==
The University of Florida fielded its first official intercollegiate sports team (football) in the fall of 1906. It adopted orange and blue as its official colors, combining the blue and white of the former Florida Agricultural College in Lake City with the orange and black of the former East Florida Seminary in Gainesville, the university's two oldest predecessor institutions. The football team did not initially have an official nickname or mascot, and was often referred to as the "Orange and Blue" or "Pee Wee's Boys," after the team's first head coach, Jack "Pee Wee" Forsythe.

In 1908, local merchant Phillip Miller and his son Austin Miller, with no official sanction from the university or athletic association, selected the alligator as an emblem to represent the university on pennants offered for sale in Miller's Gainesville store. With the state of Florida being home to millions of alligators, the "gator" proved a popular choice among members of the student body, and the Florida football team began to refer to itself as the "Gators" during the 1911 fall season.

A live alligator named Albert first appeared at football games during the 1957 season, and served as the mascot of the football team on the field before the costumed version of Albert became the mascot in 1970. He was joined by a female version, Alberta, in 1984. They often appear as a couple, but also appear alone.

In 2015, UF announced that Albert and Alberta would receive new costumes. As far as cosmetic changes, the Gator pair's eyes were "opened more" and the block "F" was replaced by a stylized "F" used on other Florida Gator marketing. The primary focus, however, was to design costumes that were more lightweight and better suited for the students performing in Florida's hot weather.

== In popular culture ==
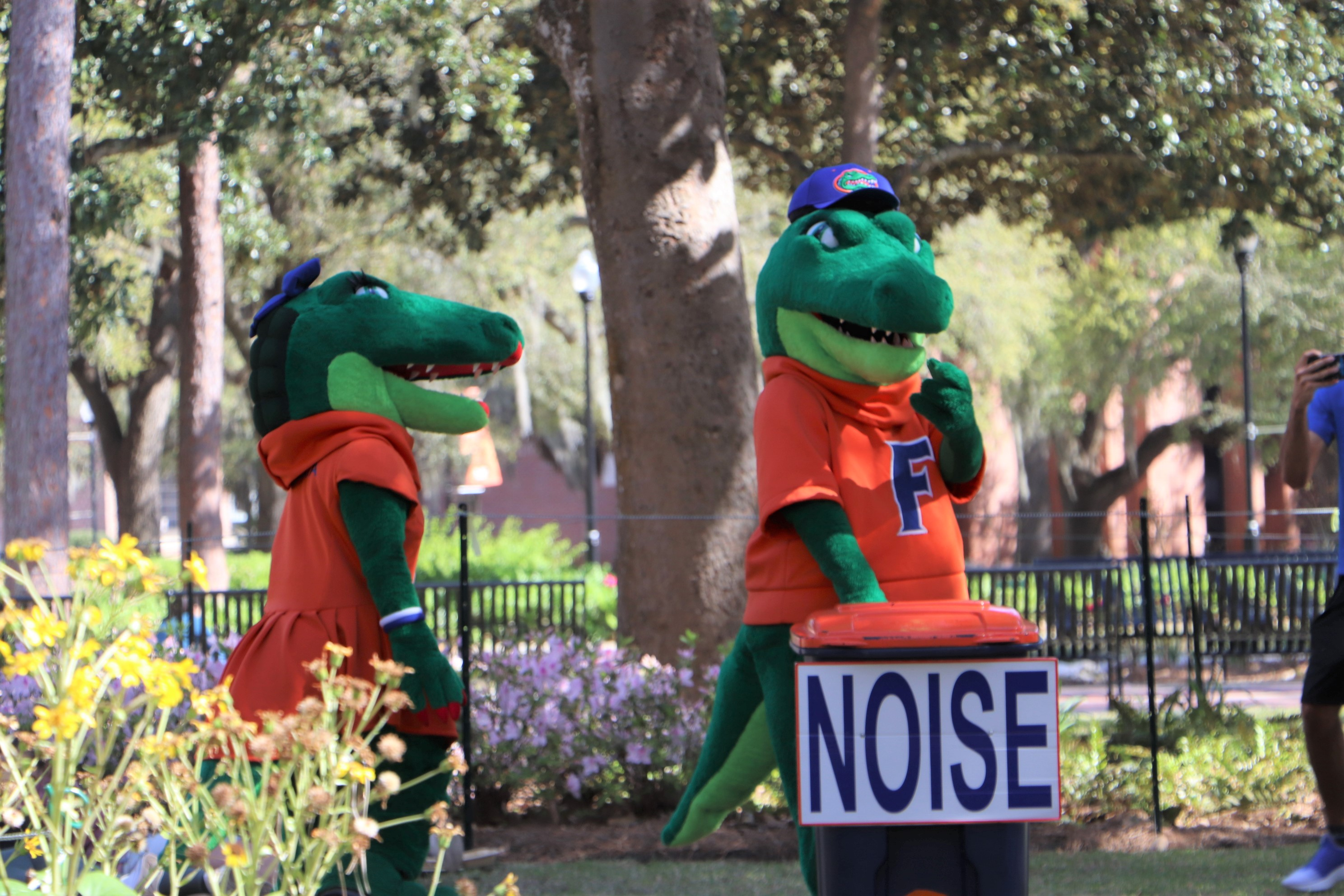
Albert and Alberta Gator on campus, in 2021.

Like many college mascots, Albert and Alberta have made appearances in the highlights of national sports and highlight shows. The most notable appearance of either was in early 2006, when Albert was featured in a This is SportsCenter commercial. He walked out of an elevator and became the object of Steve Irwin's reptile wrangling tendencies.

In June 2007, Sports Illustrated On Campus ranked Albert as the No. 1 mascot in their "Mascot Power Rankings."

Mascot Books has published three children's books featuring Albert and Alberta, entitled Hello, Albert!, Albert's Journey Through the Sunshine State and Albert and Alberta's Game Day Rules.

The mascots both have their own unique personalities and characteristics.
