= Timothy Rhea =

American conductor

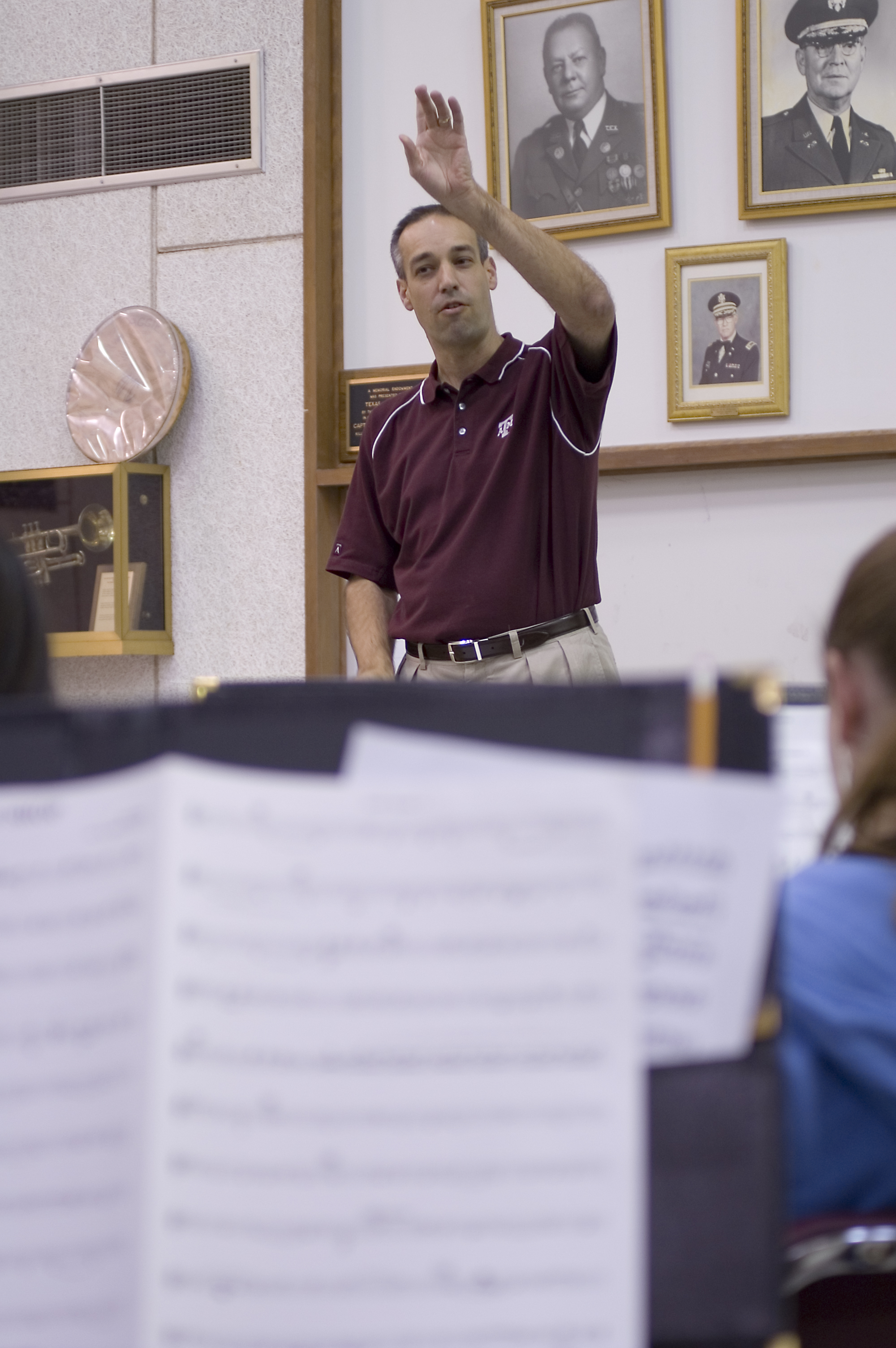

79th president of the American Bandmasters Association
- In office 2016–2017
- Preceded by: Terry Austin
- Succeeded by: Gary Smith

Director of bands, Texas A&M University
- Incumbent
- Assumed office 2002
- Preceded by: Ray E. Toler

Personal details
- Born: June 18, 1967 (age 59)
- Spouse: Jennifer Rhea
- Occupation: Conductor
- Years active: 1993-present
- Website: Texas A&M faculty bio

Military service
- Allegiance: United States
- Branch/service: Texas State Guard
- Rank: Colonel

Timothy Brett Rhea (born 1967) is director of bands and music activities at Texas A&M University. As director of bands, he leads the university band program, serves as conductor of the Texas A&M Wind Symphony, and coordinates the Fightin' Texas Aggie Band marching band. As director of music activities, he administratively oversees the activities of the jazz, orchestra, and choral programs. Rhea also served as the 79th president of the American Bandmasters Association in 2016–2017.

== Early life and education ==
Rhea grew up in the music programs of the Texas public schools. He earned a Bachelor of Music Education with honors from the University of Arkansas as a private conducting student of Eldon Janzen. He earned the Master of Music in conducting from Texas Tech University where he studied with the late James Sudduth. Rhea earned the Doctor of Musical Arts in conducting and composition from the University of Houston.

== Tenure at Texas A&M ==
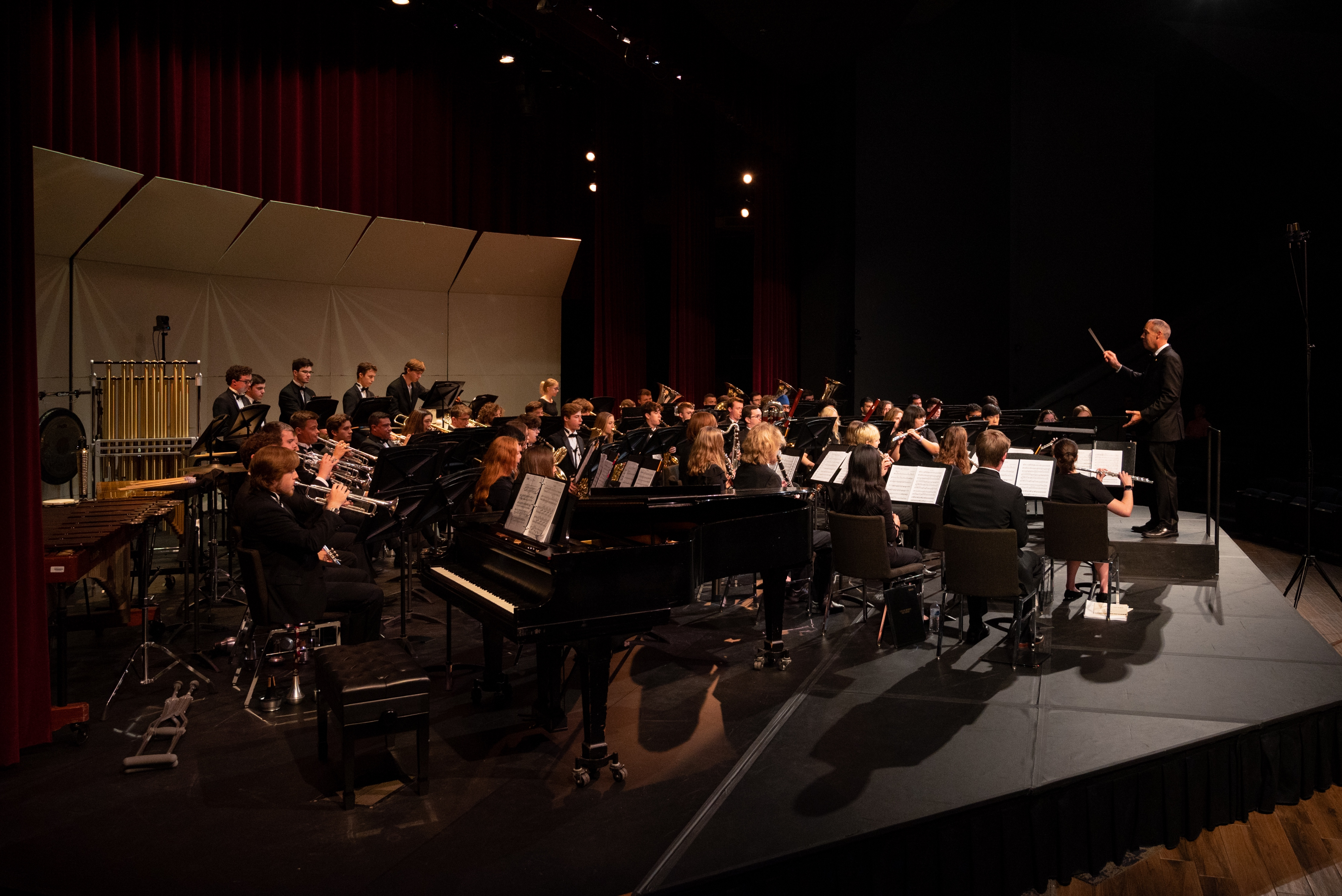
Rhea conducting the Texas A&M University Wind Symphony.

Rhea was named conductor of the Texas A&M Wind Symphony in 1995. During his tenure at Texas A&M University, he has conducted the Wind Symphony for conventions of the Texas Music Educators Association seven times, the College Band Directors National Association two times, the Midwest International Band and Orchestra Clinic in Chicago, the Western International Band Clinic in Seattle, and the American Bandmasters Association (he was the 2009 convention host), as well as in settings such as Carnegie Hall, the Meyerson Symphony Center and the Wortham Center. He has also conducted the Wind Symphony during performances in Ireland, the United Kingdom, Austria, Germany, Italy, and the Czech Republic.

Rhea's tenure with the Texas Aggie Band has included performances throughout the United States, including at the United States presidential inauguration in Washington and the inauguration of the governor of Texas in Austin, Aggie Band bowl appearances have included the Holiday, Cotton, Sugar, Independence, Chick-fil-A, Liberty, Texas, Music City, Gator, Belk and Alamo.

=== Carnegie Hall ===
On February 22, 2008. Rhea took the Texas A&M Wind Ensemble to Carnegie Hall in New York City. Under his direction, the Wind Symphony performed Leonard Bernstein's "Overture to Candide", Gustav Holst's "First Suite in E-flat for Military Band", George Gershwin's "Rhapsody in Blue" with Kathryn Woodard at the piano, Donald Grantham's "Southern Harmony", Percy Grainger's "Over The Hills And Far Away", Frank Ticheli's "Blue Shades", David F. Wilborn's newly-commissioned "Concertante Caprice", and John P. Sousa's "The Freelance March". Their encore was Sousa's "Stars and Stripes Forever".

== Composing ==
Rhea has composed and arranged over 300 works. Since the 1990s, Rhea has arranged for university and public school marching bands and served as a clinician and composer. Some of Rhea's commissions have been performed for the Texas Music Educators Association, the Texas Bandmasters Association, the College Band Directors National Association, the Cotton Bowl Classic, and the Tournament of Roses Parade. His works are published with TRN Music Publisher, RBC Music Publisher, and Arrangers' Publishing Company.

== Awards ==
In July 1999, Rhea was awarded the Outstanding Young Bandmaster of the Year for the state of Texas from Phi Beta Mu. Former president of Texas A&M University, Ray M. Bowen presented Rhea with the President's Meritorious Service Award in 2000. He more recently oversaw the planning and construction of the new Texas A&M University Music Activities Center, which opened in 2019. In this facility, the Dr. Timothy B. Rhea Concert Rehearsal Hall was named in his honor.

== Professional affiliations ==
- American Bandmasters Association, 79th president
- John Philip Sousa Foundation, vice president-secretary
- National Band Association, past board member
- Texas Music Educators Association
- Texas Bandmasters Association
- College Band Directors National Association
- SEC Band Directors Association, treasurer
- World Association of Symphonic Bands & Wind Ensembles
- American Society of Composers, Authors, & Publishers
- Phi Beta Mu
- Phi Mu Alpha
- Phi Kappa Phi
- Pi Kappa Lambda
- Kappa Delta Pi
- Kappa Kappa Psi (honorary member)
