= Fightin' Texas Aggie Band =

Official marching band of Texas A&M University

- School: Texas A&M University
- Location: College Station, Texas
- Conference: SEC
- Founded: 1894; 132 years ago
- Director: Timothy Rhea
- Associate Director: Russell Tipton; Lance Sample
- Members: 400

Uniform
- Corps of Cadets (reminiscent of pre-World War II uniforms)
- Website: musa.tamu.edu/aggie-band/

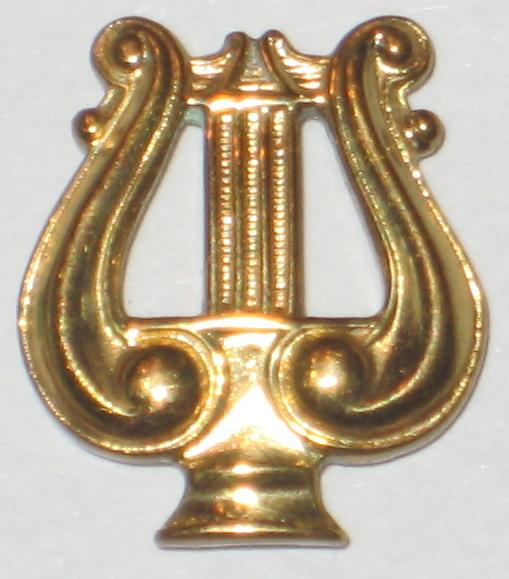
Brass band lyre worn by all non-freshman members of the Aggie Band

The Fightin' Texas Aggie Band (also known as the Noble Men of Kyle or just the Aggie Band) is the official marching band of Texas A&M University. Composed of over 400 men and women from the school's Corps of Cadets, it is the largest military marching band in the United States. The band's complex military marching maneuvers are performed exclusively to traditional marches. They are one of the few military bands at major universities, as opposed to the more common HBCU, Drum Corps, and “show band” styles.

The Aggie Band was founded in 1894 by Joseph Holick, who, after being recruited as a cobbler at the then Agricultural and Mechanical College of Texas, began playing Reveille and Taps for cadet functions. With the commandant’s blessing, Holick became the first bandmaster and formed a cadet band that grew from its original 13 members in 1894 to 75 by 1924. The band’s fierce reputation originated from an unusual tradition in which early drum majors were selected through physical combat; the moniker "Fightin’ Texas Aggie Band" was coined by cadets in recognition of this aggressiveness.

Richard J. Dunn was selected as the band director in 1924 and transformed them into the nationally recognized military-style marching band it is today. Dunn introduced precision drills, the iconic “Block T” formation, and new musical traditions such as The Spirit of Aggieland. Later directors further expanded its size, repertoire, and reputation, with the band performing at high-profile events including presidential inaugurations, major parades, and the dedication of the George H. W. Bush Presidential Library. By the late 20th century, the Aggie Band had become a central symbol of Texas A&M’s Corps of Cadets.

Since its inception, its members of the band eat together, sleep in the same dormitories, and practice up to forty hours per week on top of a full academic schedule. The Aggie Band performs at all home football games, some away games, and university and Corps functions throughout the year. The band has also participated in inauguration parades for many United States presidents and Texas governors, major annual parades across the country, and the dedication ceremony for the George H. W. Bush Presidential Library.

== History ==
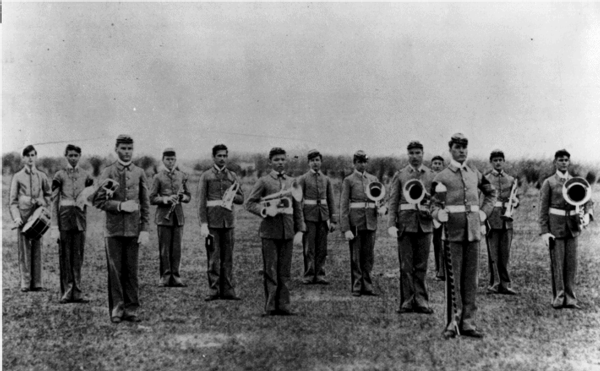
The Aggie Band's first 13 members led by drum major "California" Morse. Bandmaster Joe Holick is not pictured.

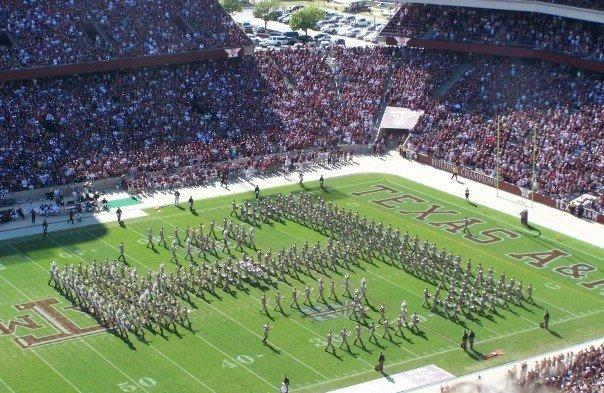
"ATM" formation during halftime at Kyle Field, a variation of the "Block T" created by Dunn

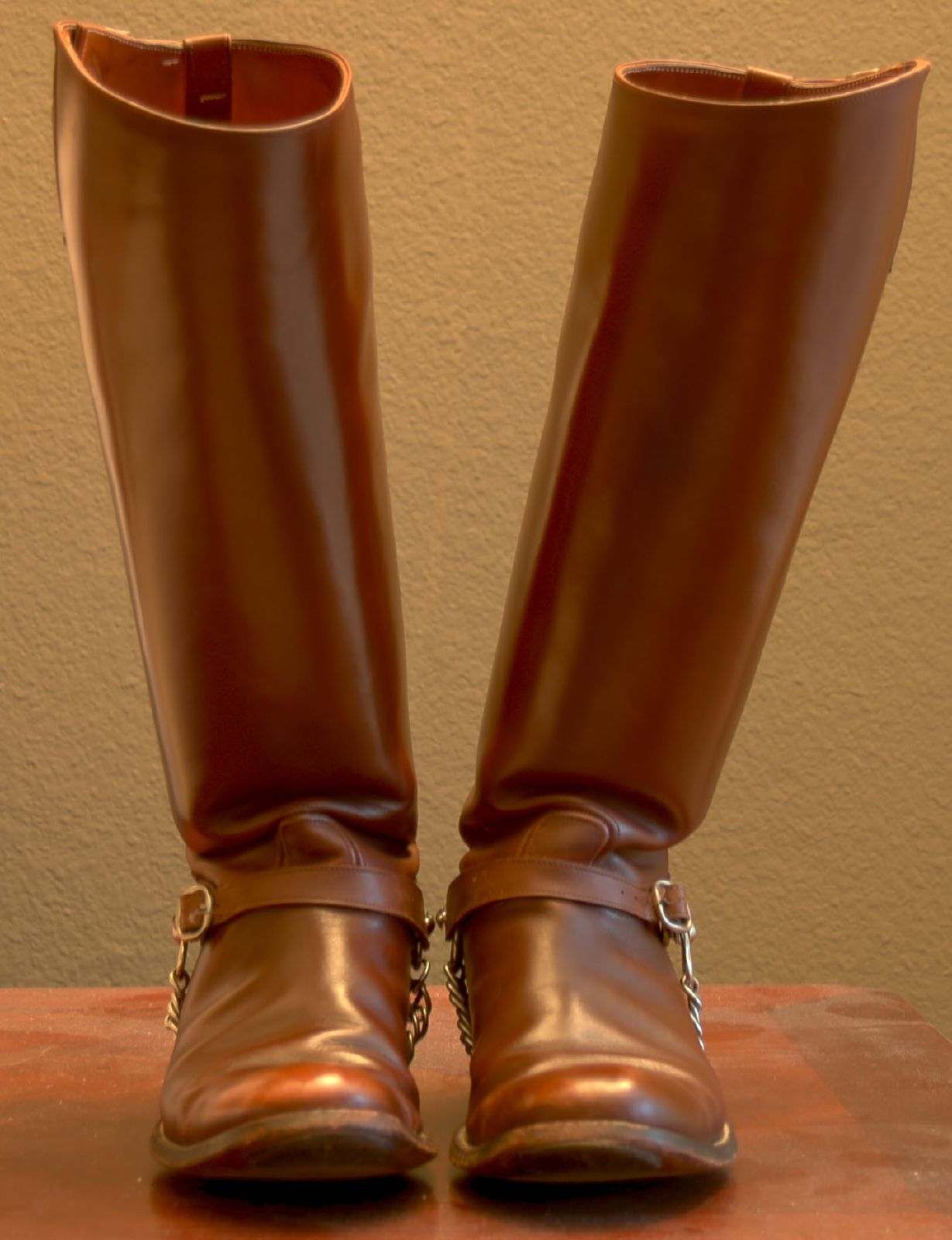
An example of senior Boots, which Dunn tried to eliminate.

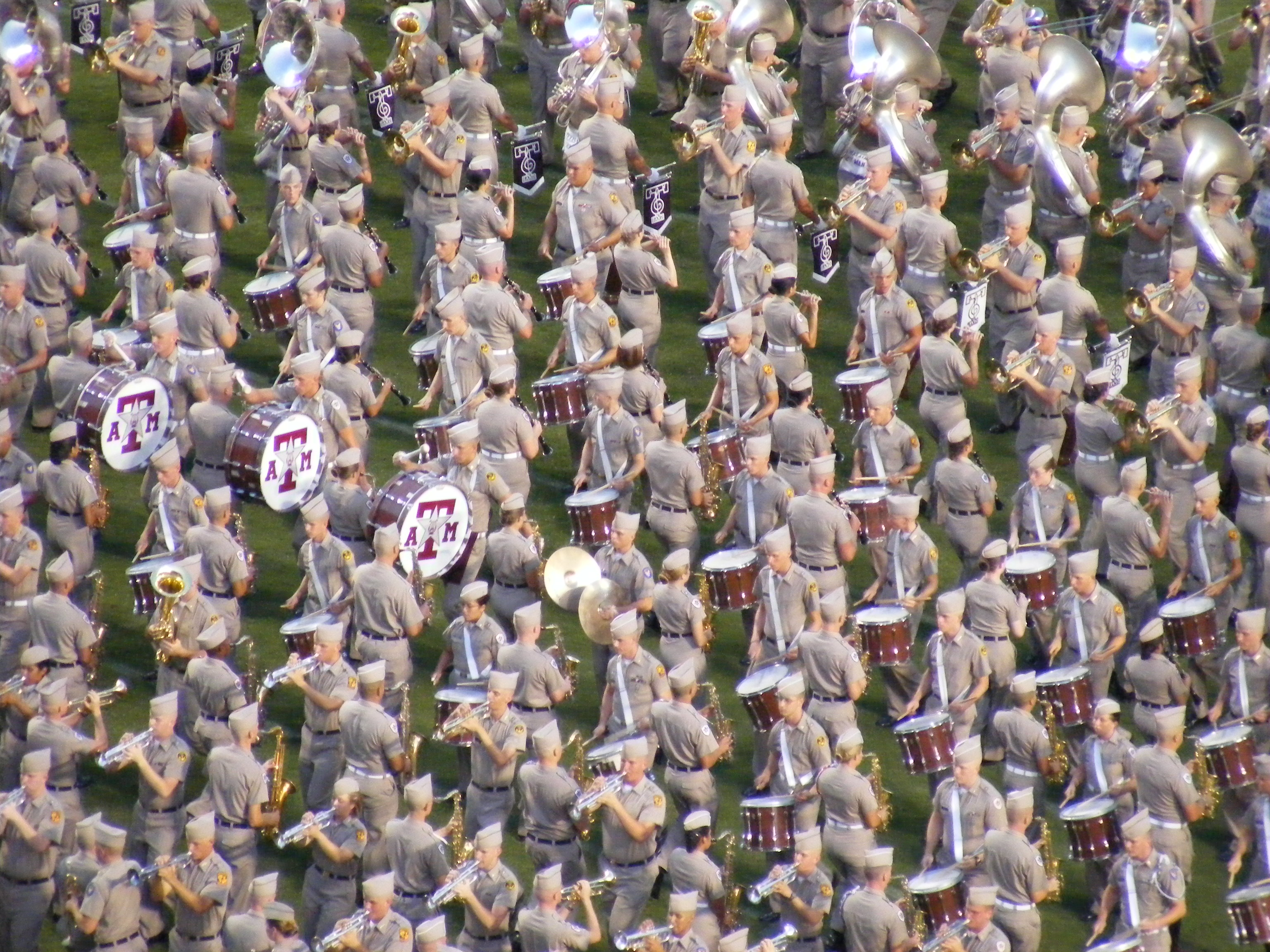
The 2007–2008 Aggie Band performs a countermarch, a maneuver first introduced by Adams.

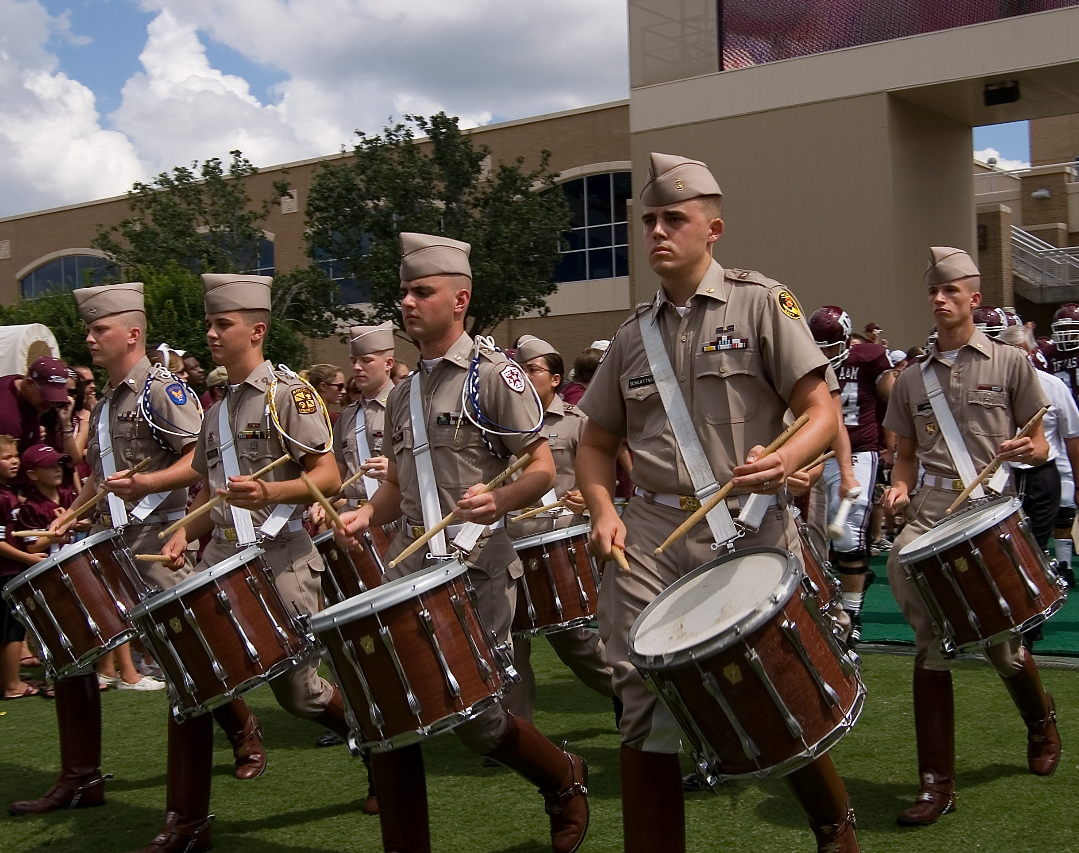
Drummers from the Aggie Band leading the football team into Kyle Field.

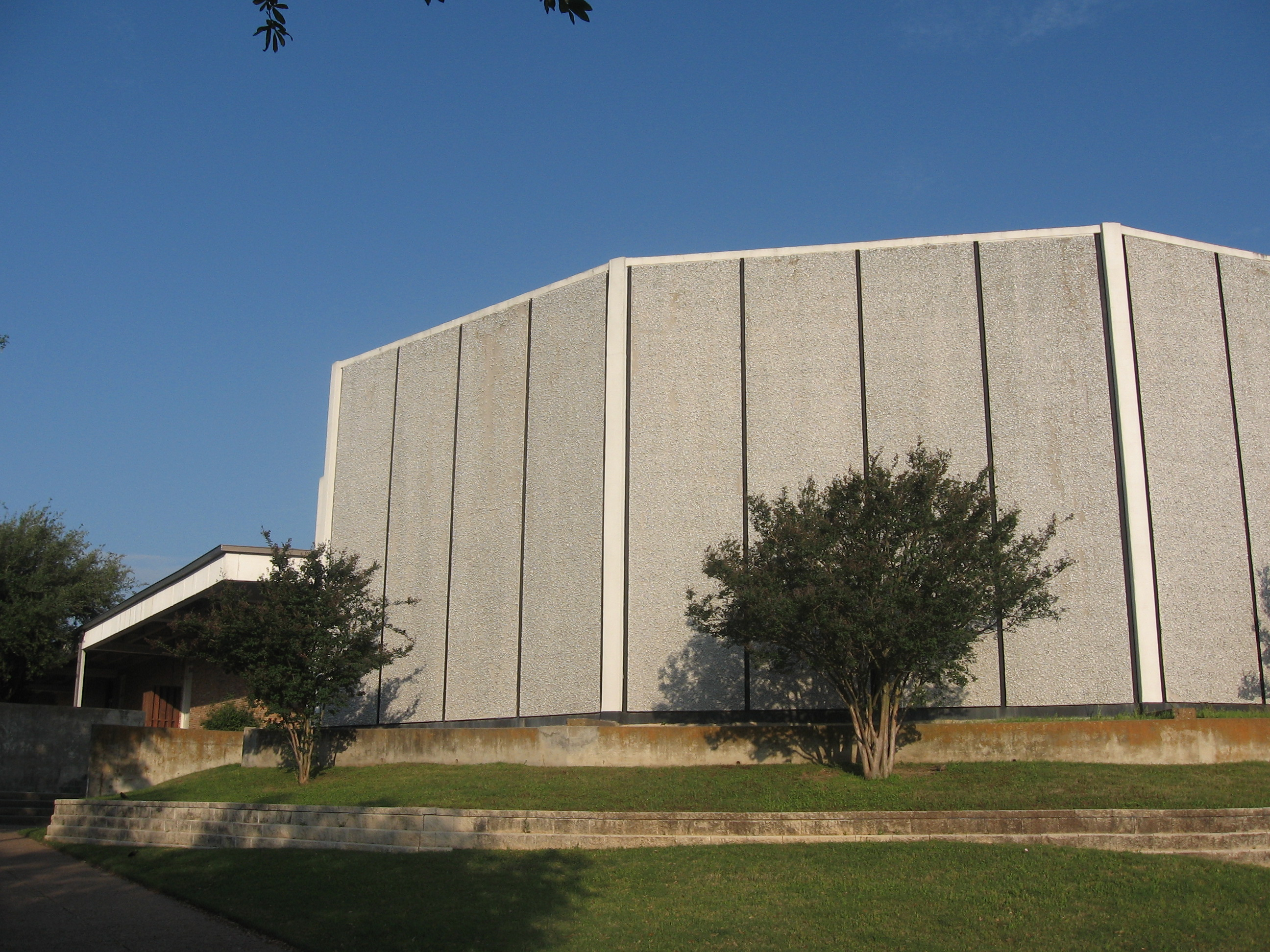
E.V. Adams Band Hall

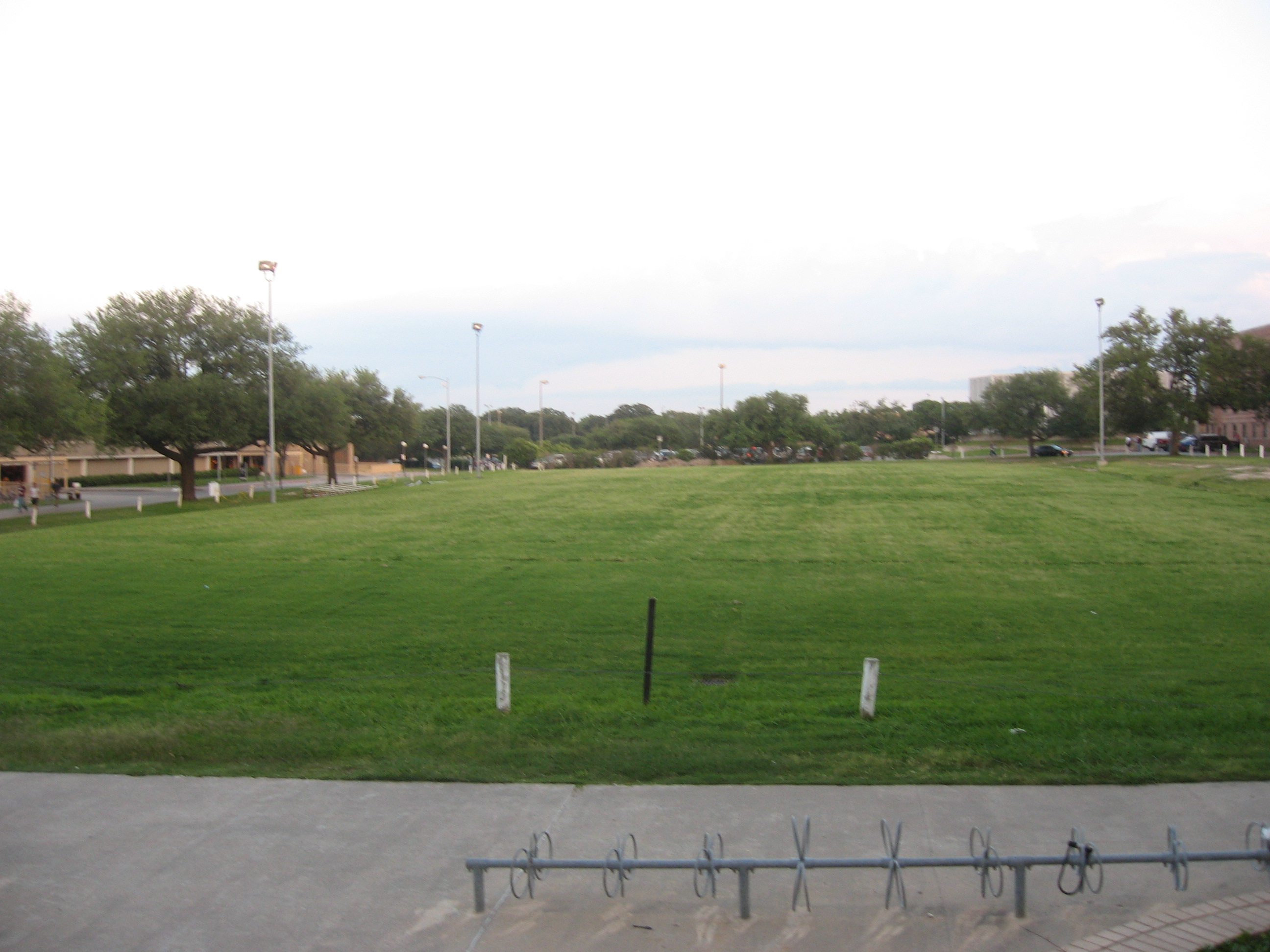
The Joe T. Haney Drill Field, considered by bandsmen to be a "working memorial" as the ashes of some former bandsmen have been scattered across it

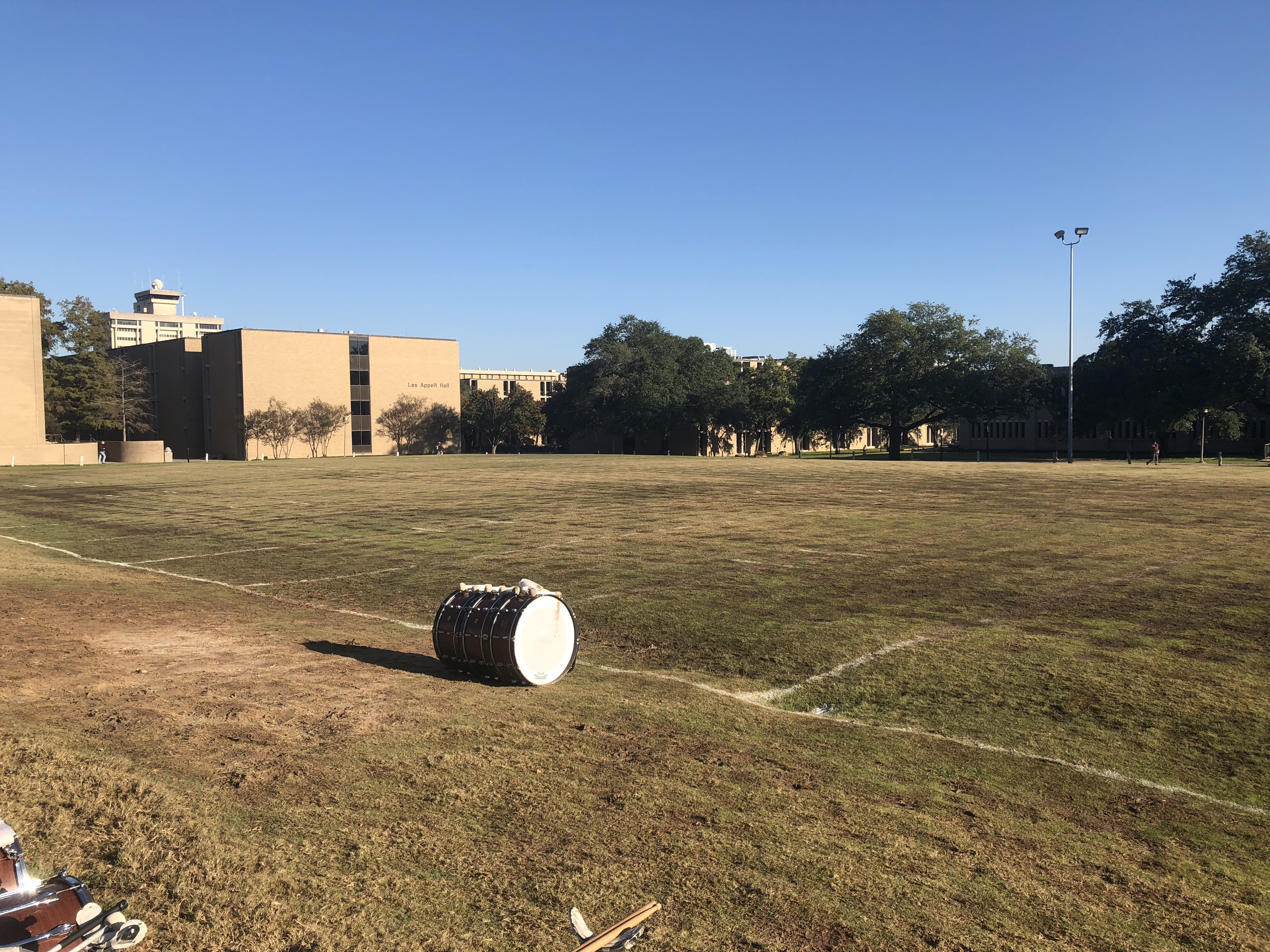
The Haney Drill Field ceased to be used by the Aggie Band in November 2018. Notice the ruts created by constant formation marching.

The Fightin’ Texas Aggie Band was founded in 1894 by Joseph Holick, a Czech-born bootmaker and bugler at the Agricultural and Mechanical College of Texas (now Texas A&M University). Holick began playing Reveille and Taps for campus events and, with the commandant's blessing, formed a cadet band that grew from its original 13 members to 75 by 1924. Holick served as the first bandmaster and was instrumental in establishing the band's early traditions. He was also known for crafting the highly prized senior boots worn by cadets. Holick's contributions laid the foundation for what would become one of the nation's most respected collegiate military bands.

In 1924, Colonel Richard J. Dunn, a former clarinetist in John Philip Sousa’s U.S. Marine Band, became the band's director. Dunn introduced precision military drills and formalized musical selections, including “The Spirit of Aggieland,” which became central to Aggie tradition. Under his leadership, the band adopted more professional rehearsal standards and expanded its influence throughout the Southwest Conference. Dunn's tenure was marked by a commitment to excellence and a focus on discipline and precision. His contributions significantly shaped the band's identity and reputation. During World War II, the Aggie Band was divided into Infantry and Artillery units to align with wartime Corps reorganization. Membership peaked at nearly 250 during the early war years, but many cadets were drafted before graduation, reducing the group’s size. Even with diminished numbers, the band performed at campus reviews, war bond rallies, and military ceremonies, reinforcing its role as a patriotic emblem during a time of national mobilization. The band's adaptability and resilience during this period demonstrated its commitment to tradition and service.

After the war, Colonel E.V. Adams, an alumnus from the class of 1929, became director in 1946. Under Adams, the band introduced its most famous maneuver, the Four-Way Cross, in 1947. Band directors of the era deemed the formation impossible since it theoretically required two people to be in the same place at the same time, and even today drill-charting software says this maneuver cannot be performed. However, the Aggie Band executed it flawlessly, cementing its reputation for unmatched precision. Adams also worked to expand rehearsal facilities and initiated the creation of the Aggie Band Association in 1967 to support alumni engagement. His leadership was characterized by a focus on excellence and a deep commitment to the traditions of the Aggie Band. The postwar period also brought wider cultural recognition. During the 1950s and 1960s, the Aggie Band performed at presidential inaugurations, nationally broadcast football games, and state ceremonies. A 1966 New York Times feature described Texas A&M as “an institution where traditions, exemplified by the military band, overshadow the modern university’s impulses toward change,” underscoring how the ensemble shaped outside perceptions of Aggieland. This period marked the Aggie Band's emergence as a national symbol of collegiate excellence and military tradition.

When Adams retired in 1973, Lt. Col. Joe T. Haney took over and further modernized the program. He established new musical groups including a symphonic band and orchestra, diversified halftime shows to incorporate musical-only segments, and admitted women following a federal court decision in 1985. That integration, initially controversial, quickly became normalized as female cadets earned leadership positions in the band and Corps of Cadets. Haney's tenure marked a period of significant transformation and growth for the Aggie Band. Haney’s tenure also brought moments of national attention. In 1981, the band collided during a halftime drill at Rice University, forcing the performance to halt. The following week, however, the Aggie Band executed a flawless show that drew praise in the Bryan-College Station Eagle, which remarked that A&M was “the only school that throws in a free football game with its performance.” Haney's leadership during this period was instrumental in navigating challenges and maintaining the band's high standards.

From 1989 to 2001, Col. Ray Toler expanded public engagement through televised specials and national appearances. In 2001, the Aggie Band received the Louis Sudler Trophy for collegiate marching bands, recognizing sustained excellence in both music and precision marching. That same year, they marched in the inaugural parade of President George W. Bush, an A&M alumnus, bringing the band into national political and cultural spotlight. Toler's leadership was marked by efforts to enhance the band's visibility and prestige on the national stage.

Since 2002, Dr. Timothy Rhea has directed the Aggie Band, overseeing its move into the Music Activities Center in 2019, a state-of-the-art rehearsal and performance facility. Under his leadership, the band has emphasized publishing arrangements, expanding international visibility, and maintaining its reputation for intricate military-style drills at home football games. Texas A&M remains the only military-style marching band among Division 1 schools. In December 2018, national media spotlighted the band as it performed “Hail to the Chief” and the “Aggie War Hymn” for President George H. W. Bush’s funeral procession at Texas A&M, an event broadcast worldwide.

== Cadet life ==
A senior cadet from the band carrying a sabre; note the brass lyre on the collar indicating this cadet is from the band.

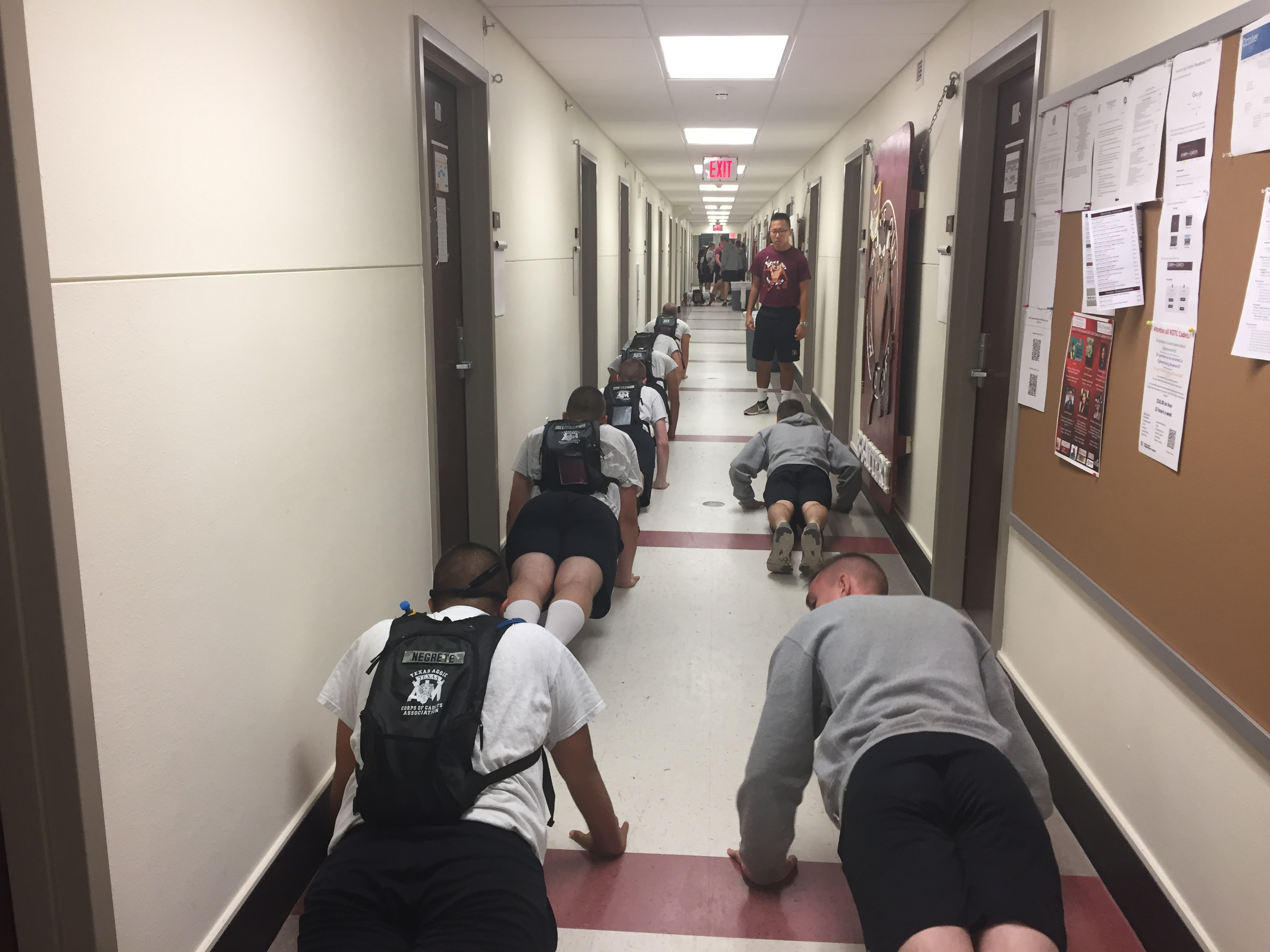
Band freshmen (at left) receive corrective physical training, supervised by upperclassmen

The Aggie Band is a major unit in the Corps, comparable in size to a brigade or wing. It is unique among college bands; no other band eats and lives together as a military unit, even at the Service Academies and military colleges. Bandsmen wear their cadet uniforms to class, drill, meetings, and other functions on campus. As a requested component of football away games, they perform at more football games than any other band. As of 1993, the band performed at 125 of the last 131 football games, including a streak of 42 straight from 1981 to 1984. Demand is extremely high for the band and one person, upon finding out the Aggie Band would not be performing at the local football game versus A&M, returned and requested a refund for 40 tickets.

The Aggie Band performs a new show each week during the football season and does not generally repeat drills from week to week. During the fall semester, the Aggie Band practices for 90 minutes every weekday morning and on Saturdays every week with a football game. In addition, some components of the band also practice on Sunday afternoons and planning of the drills takes place throughout the fall semester. All told, drills can take eight to nine hours per week on top of a full academic schedule and Corps/ROTC activities.

All seniors in the Corps of Cadets wear distinctive cavalry riding boots with their uniforms. These boots usually cost more than $1,800 and are generally made at Holick's, formerly owned by the family of Joseph Holick, the first band director.

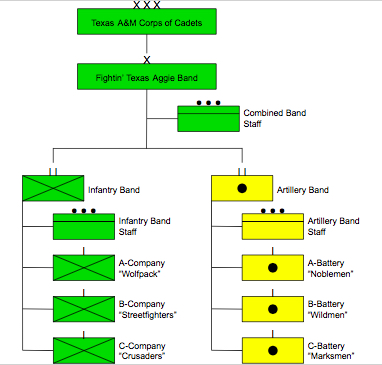
Aggie Band organizational structure as of 2025

=== Organization ===
The members of the band are called BQs and, since the band's inception, are part of the Corps of Cadets. Unique among Corps units, however, the band is divided into two battalions of three "outfits" each, the Infantry Band and the Artillery Band. All BQs are assigned to one of the six outfits. Each battalion is commanded by a Cadet Lieutenant Colonel and has its own command staff; each outfit is commanded by a Cadet Major. Outfits are further divided into platoons, squads, and fire teams, led by a Cadet Captain, Cadet Staff Sergeant, and Cadet Corporal, respectively. Due to its status as a Senior Military College, all cadets are required to take ROTC classes at least their first two years, though follow-on military service is not required.

From 1948, the Maroon and White Bands functioned as single outfits, with the band as a whole functioning as an independent battalion. When the Infantry and Artillery Bands were reestablished in 1976, they were divided into two outfits each: A-Company and B-Company in the Infantry Band, and A-Battery and B-Battery in the Artillery Band. C-Company and C-Battery existed briefly from 1983 to 1984, then were permanently reactivated in 2013.

=== Leadership ===
Unlike many bands, the drum majors are not in charge of the band as a whole. Like all major units of the Corps, it has its own commander, a Cadet Colonel. Due to necessity for military functions, the Band Commander is accorded the privilege of the first file in bugle rank (the lead rank of the band). During formal military ceremonies, the Band Commander carries a sabre instead of a bugle, as do all other unit commanders. The Infantry and Artillery Bands perform together for halftime shows, but are often split for minor performances such as local parades and functions where the entire band is not needed. Furthermore, the band is composed of three different ROTC programs and appoints commanders to manage and train the cadets within their respective ROTC affiliations.

On the field, the band is led by three drum majors and the twelve members of bugle rank. Each drum major carries a mace and directs the band based on its movements and whistle commands during a drill. The head drum major is a Cadet Lieutenant Colonel, while the two side drum majors, the Infantry Band Drum Major and the Artillery Band Drum Major, are Cadet Majors.

Bugle rank consists of the Band Commander and eleven other senior cadets who are well respected in the band and have impeccable marching abilities. Each bugle rank member carries a bugle with a banner, which are never played during a performance. Together, the drum majors and bugle rank lead the band through the maneuvers on the field. In addition to their primary functions within the band, the bugles and maces also serve a military ceremonial function and are used to salute commissioned officers, much as a rifleman would salute with a rifle or a commander would salute with a sabre.

=== Composition ===
The band has over 400 members, though as of 2019, a typical performance fields slightly over 300 bandsmen. Instrumentation consists of more than 60 trumpets, 40 trombones, 30 mellophones, 30 baritones, 25 bass horns, 40 drummers, and 90 assorted woodwinds, though the actual composition varies annually. There are no flutes in the Aggie Band, as their position while being played would hinder the intricate marching maneuvers. Piccolos are used instead. All members of the band must have high school marching experience, an audition during the spring semester leading into the first fall semester of attendance to include major scales and sight reading, and an individual interview with the band director. Prospective members are also encouraged to participate in the Spend the Night with the Corps program to better understand the rigors of life in the Corps of Cadets.

== Marching ==
=== Complex maneuvers ===
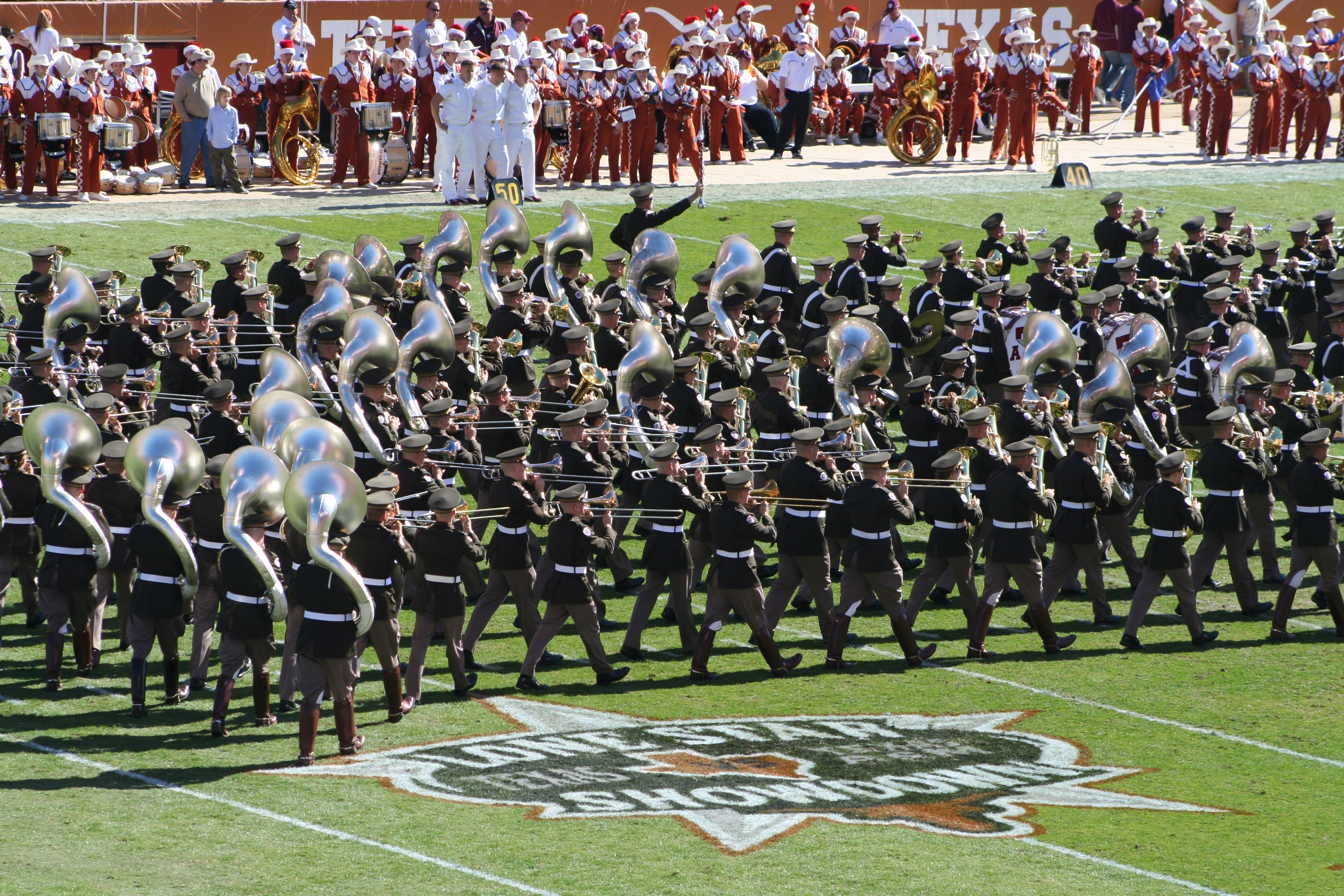
The Band finishes an oblique movement as they march past the Lone Star Showdown logo at the Darrell K Royal–Texas Memorial Stadium.

The repertoire of the Aggie Band's maneuvers is designed by the directors and drum majors and can include obliques, flanks, countermarches, and other Army marching maneuvers. The Band is generally led by the bugle rank with each person following the person in front of them, also known as follow-the-leader. Space between band members during countermarches is less than six inches (15 cm) and during other maneuvers even less. This space is insufficient for the bass horns and some members must turn their horns to complete the maneuver. According to an article in The Battalion, "some of the Aggie band's maneuvers are so complex that some drill-charting software says that the drills are impossible because they require multiple people to be in the same place at the same time." This is also discussed in a video by The Association of Former Students of Texas A&M University.

The Fightin' Texas Aggie Band has performed at inauguration parades for many Presidents of the United States in Washington, D.C., including at the personal request of President-elect George H. W. Bush. Other events in which the band has participated include inauguration parades for Governors of Texas, major annual parades across the country, and the dedication ceremony for the George H. W. Bush Presidential Library.

=== Typical halftime drill ===
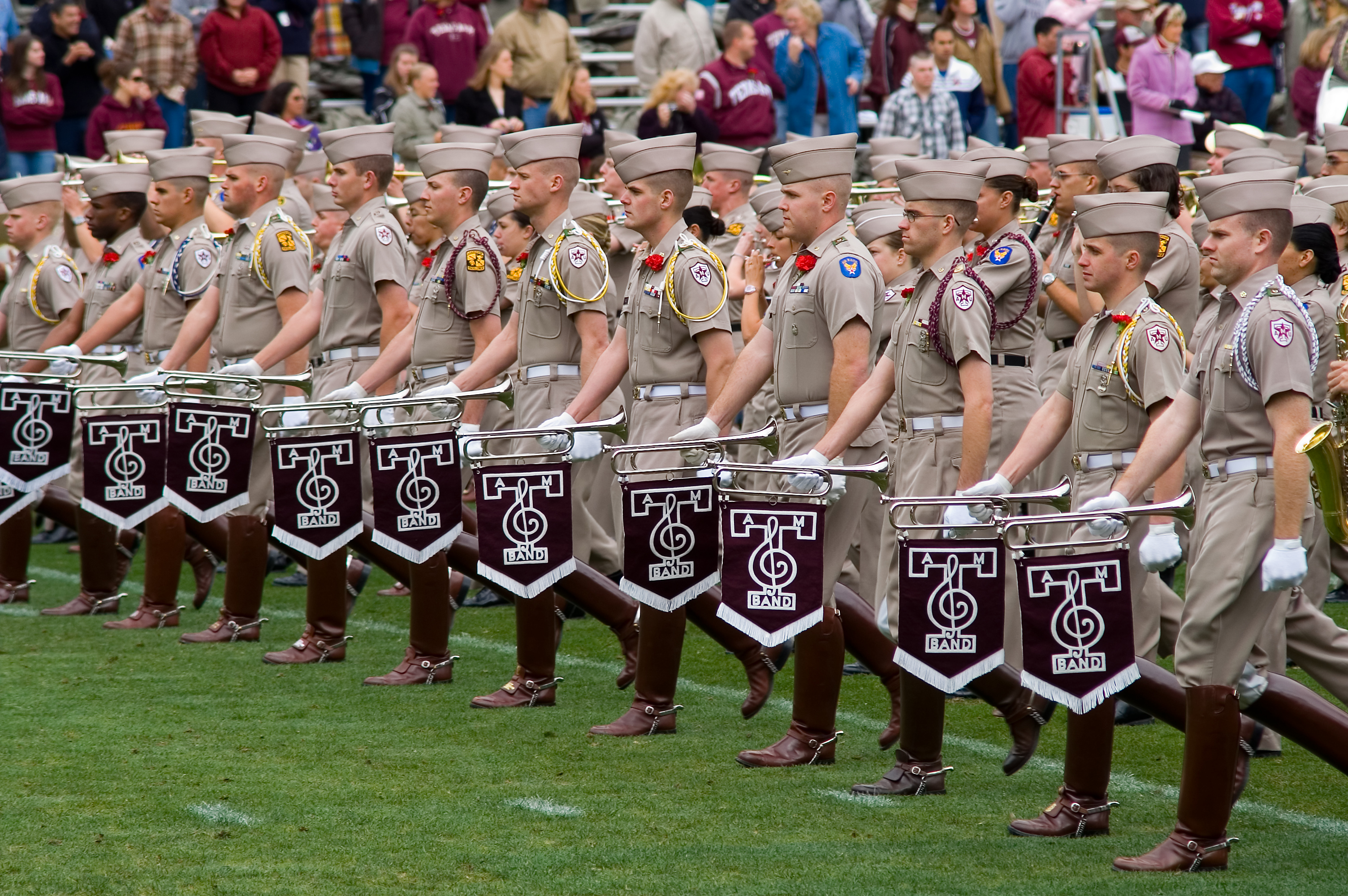
The Fightin' Texas Aggie Band's Bugle Rank leads the band at halftime at the 2007 Maroon and White football game.

The halftime drill always begins with the band running into place at the command of the drum major's whistle. The announcer, an associate band director, then states, usually the crowd in unison with him says, "Ladies and gentlemen, now forming at the north end of Kyle Field, the nationally famous Fightin' Texas Aggie Band.". A whoop and cheers come from the audience. The drum majors then march out in front of the band and the head drum major calls the band to attention and vocally gives directions to the band, referencing the composition of the Aggie War Hymn, by shouting, "Recall! Step off on Hullabaloo!" (Recall is a traditional Army bugle call – the first 34 notes, and intro of the Aggie War Hymn. "Hullabaloo" is the first word sung in the Aggie War Hymn.) These directions are not amplified in any way, but can be heard across the entire stadium. After another whoop, the drum majors signal for the horns to be lifted into playing position with two quick whistle blasts and the bugle rank does a flourish.

The drill then begins with the band playing the opening notes of the War Hymn and stepping off into the initial formation. At some point in the drill, the band converts from Spread formation to Block formation. With no cessation of the music until the band leaves the field, the drill continues and often stops with the band playing the last stanza in place in the center of the field before moving into the signature "Block T" or "Block ATM". When done playing, the band runs off the field.

The most popular of the Band's maneuvers is The Four-Way Cross due to its difficulty (drill-charting software indicates that the drill is technically impossible, as two people have to occupy the same space simultaneously). In this maneuver, the band splits into four groups of three files and march through each other from the corners of the field.

Other specific maneuvers in the drill can include:

- The Criss Cross: the band files split into two halves and march through each other at 90° angles
- Minstrel Turns: band members pass through each other by stepping between each other's feet.
- Spread-to-Block: the band moves from being 30 files wide (i.e., across the width of the football field) by 12 ranks deep (i.e., along the length of the football field) to 12 files wide by 30 ranks deep
- Block-to-Spread: the opposite of Spread-to-Block
- Continuous Countermarch: the bugle rank leads two successive countermarches following the back of the band through the maneuver
- Wheel Turns (also known as a Gate Turn): A turn of a block of the band where the people on the inside of the turn reduce their step size.

== Music ==
As a military marching band, the Aggie Band exclusively plays traditional marches. Among many other marches, its primary repertoire includes:

- Fightin' Texas Aggie War Hymn

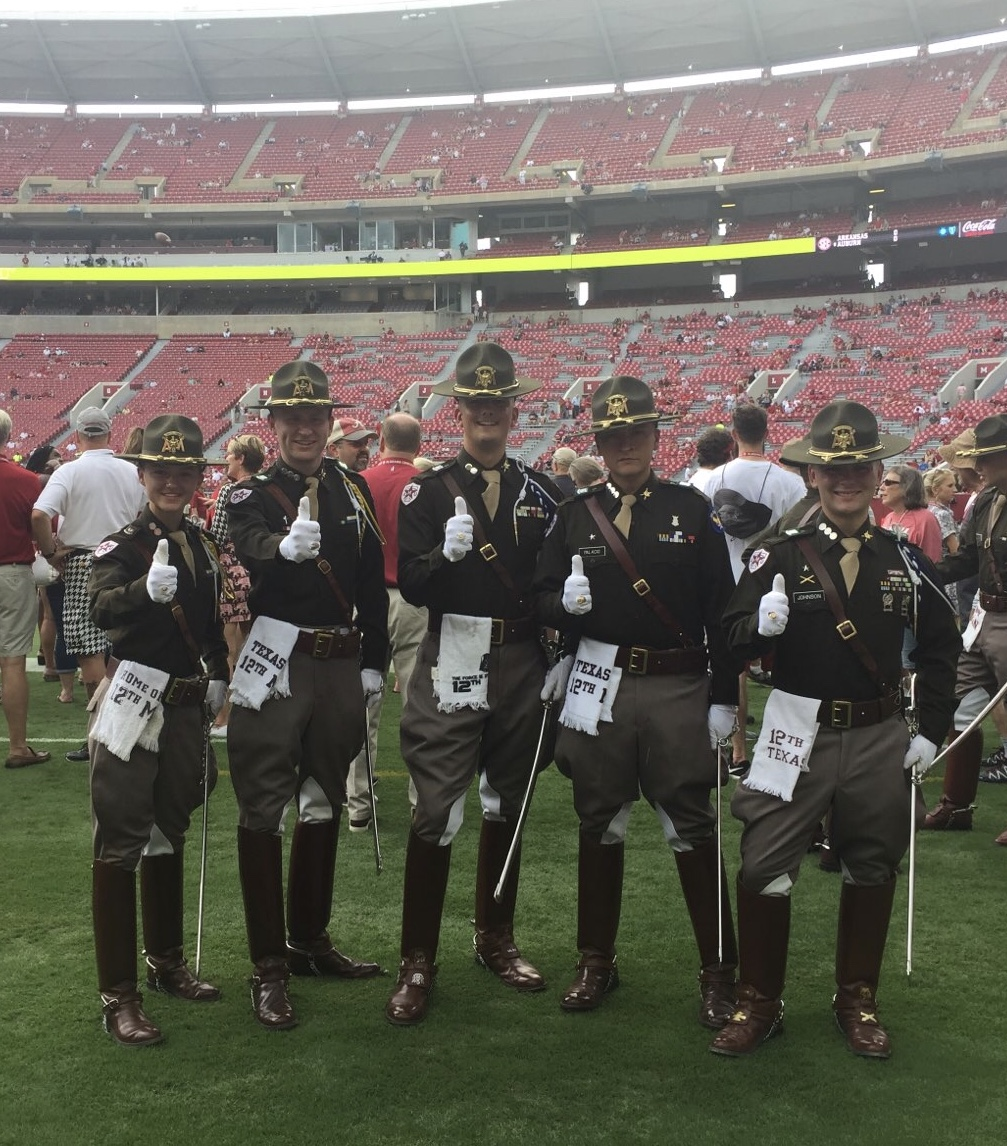
Bandsmen serving as Officers of the Day at Bryant-Denny Stadium

- Spirit of Aggieland: The school's alma mater
- The Noble Men of Kyle: The group's signature march; also a nickname for the band
- Ballad of the Green Berets
- The main theme from the 1970 film Patton
- When Johnny Comes Marching Home
- Strategic Air Command March

== Notable members ==
- Henry Cisneros, 10th United States Secretary of Housing and Urban Development and former Mayor of San Antonio. Commander of the combined band (1967-1968)
- General Eric Smith, 39th Commandant of the United States Marine Corps and commander of the combined band (1986-1987)
- General Joe Ramirez, Commandant of the Texas A&M Corps of Cadets (2011-2021).

== See also ==
- United States military bands
- Texas A&M Singing Cadets
- Texas A&M University Century Singers
- Texas A&M Wind Symphony
- Highty-Tighties
