= Texas A&M Wind Symphony =

Concert band

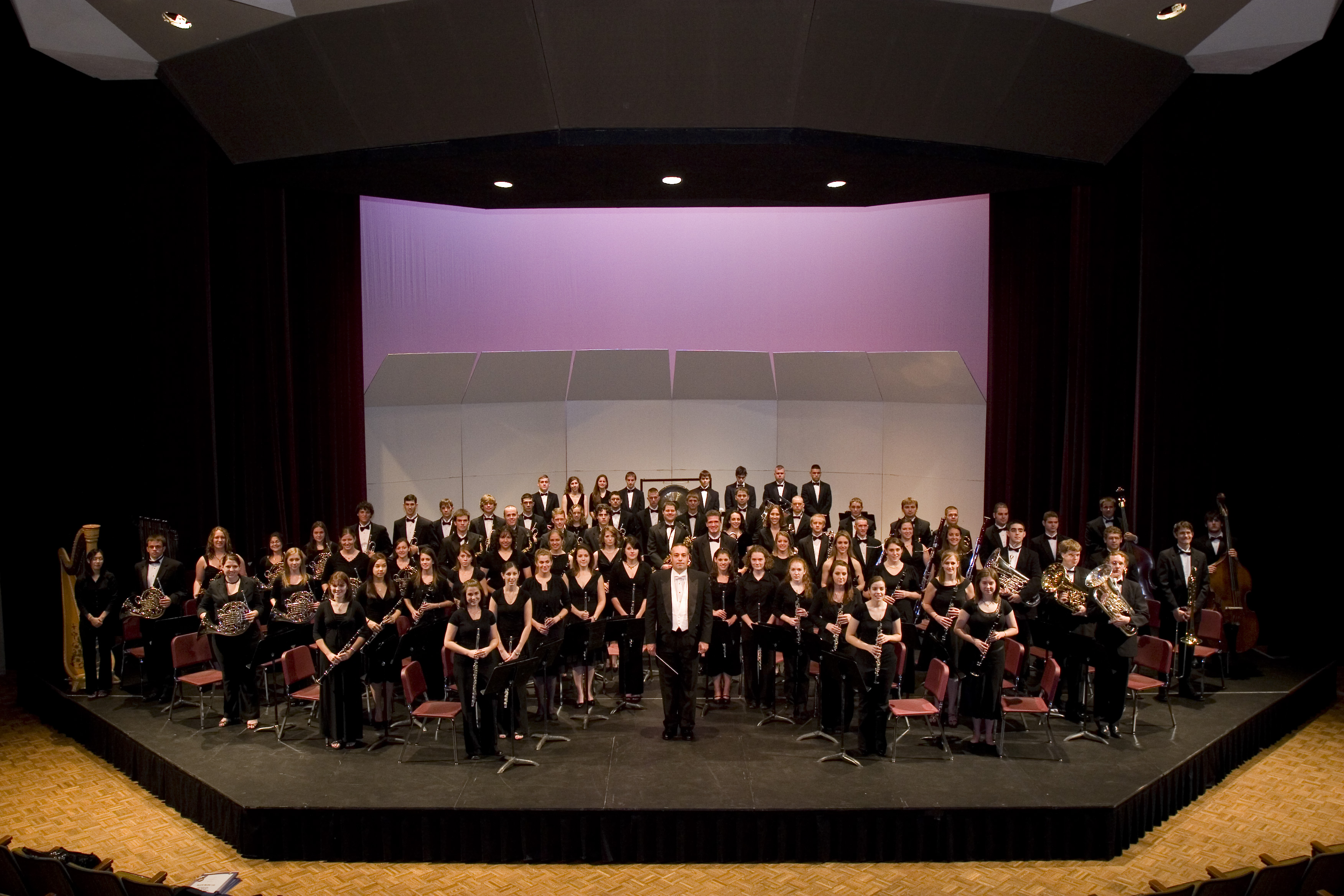

Background information
- Also known as: TAMU Wind Symphony
- Origin: Texas A&M University, College Station, Texas, United States
- Genres: Classical
- Occupation: Wind Symphony
- Years active: 1989-present
- Members: Principal Conductor; Dr. Timothy Rhea; Principal Guest Conductor; Travis Almany; Conductor Laureate; Bill Dean
- Website: www.tamubands.tamu.edu

The Texas A&M Wind Symphony is a 63-member ensemble, representing "the finest wind and percussion players on the TAMU campus". The conductor of the Wind Symphony is Dr. Timothy Rhea and his assistant is Lt. Travis Almany. The band rehearses in the E.V. Adams Band Hall.

== Timothy Rhea's tenure ==
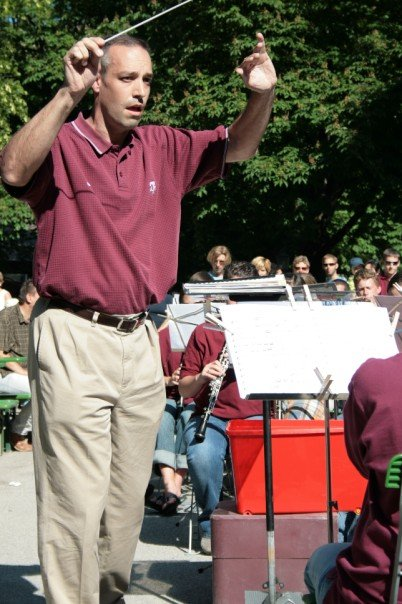
Timothy Rhea conducts the Texas A&M Wind Symphony during a light concert in Munich, Germany; May 2007

Timothy Rhea was named conductor of the Texas A&M Wind Symphony in 1995 and Director of Bands of Texas A&M University June 1, 2002. Rhea has conducted the Wind Symphony at the Texas Music Educators Association, the College Band Directors National Association, and the American Bandmasters Association conventions. Upon several occasions, he has toured with the band throughout the state of Texas, including performances at the Meyerson Symphony Center in Dallas, the Wortham Center in Houston, as well as San Antonio and Austin. Under his direction, the Wind Symphony has released a six volume march series, entitled "Legacy of the March"; a four volume band music album, "Wind Band Masterworks"; and, occasionally, live concert recordings.

Timothy Rhea conducts the Texas A&M University Wind Symphony in Prague.

== Recordings ==
The band records regularly each academic year and its series of compact discs recordings are with Mark Custom Recording of New York City. Due to the popularity of the band's ability to perform marches, for every compact disc consisting of traditional and modern music, another is dedicated solely to marches. As of February 2008, the Texas A&M Wind Symphony has released four volumes of their Wind Band Masterworks collection and six volumes of their Legacy of the March series. Additionally, upon occasion, the band releases recordings of live performances, depending on the venue.

== See also ==
- Fightin' Texas Aggie Band
- Texas A&M Singing Cadets
- Texas A&M University Century Singers
