= Marching band =

Company of instrumental musicians

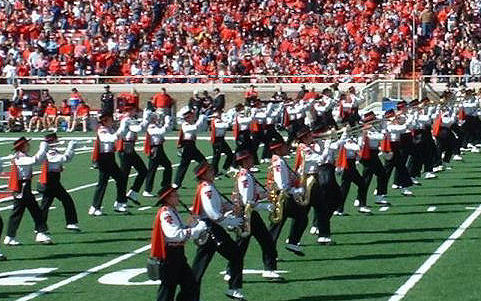
Goin' Band from Raiderland, the college marching band of Texas Tech University in Lubbock, Texas

A marching band is a group of instrumental musicians who play while marching. Historically, they have been used in armed forces and many marching bands remain military bands. Others are still associated with military units or emulate a military style (most notably some Texas high school and college bands), with elements such as uniforms, flags and batons and occasionally rifles or sabers. Instrumentation typically includes brass, woodwind, and percussion instruments.

Marching bands are generally categorized by affiliation, function, size and instrumentation. In addition to traditional military parades, marching bands are frequently seen at events as varied as carnivals, parades, sporting events, trade union events and marching band competitions.

== History ==
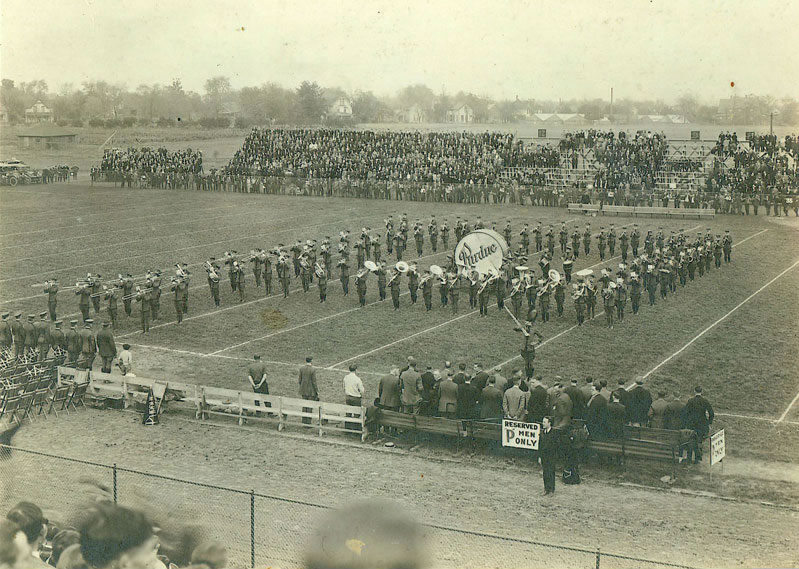
The first marching band formation, the Purdue All-American Marching Band "P Block"

Instruments have been frequently used on the battlefield (for example the Iron Age carnyx and the medieval Ottoman military band) but the modern marching band developed from European military bands formed in the Baroque period, partly influenced by the Ottoman tradition. 17th-century traveler Evliya Çelebi noted the existence of 40 guilds of musicians in Istanbul. In the 18th century, each regiment in the British Army maintained its own military band. Until 1749 bandsmen were civilians hired at the expense of the colonel commanding a regiment. Subsequently, they became regular enlisted men who accompanied the unit on active service to provide morale enhancing music on the battlefield or, from the late nineteenth century on, to act as stretcher bearers. Instruments during the 18th century included fifes, drums, the oboe (hautbois), French horn, clarinet and bassoon. Drummers summoned men from their farms and ranches to muster for duty. In the chaotic environment of the battlefield, musical instruments were the only means of commanding the men to advance, stand or retire. In the mid 19th century, each smaller unit had their own fifer and drummer, who sounded the daily routine. When units massed for battle a band of musicians was formed for the whole.

In the United States, modern marching bands are often associated with American football games, with the oldest (the University of Notre Dame Band of the Fighting Irish) first performing at an American football game in 1887. After World War I, the presence and quality of marching bands in the American public school system expanded as military veterans with service band experience began to accept music teaching positions within schools with developments such as Precision Drill, a disciplined geometric march, based in part on military-style drill. Precision, or military, Drill was pioneered by A.R. Casavant, and was the primary style of marching bands until the mid-1970s. Military style Marching Bands remain popular in East Texas, where high school bands and the Fightin' Texas Aggie Band still keep the military tradition alive. The UIL officially created a separate state competition for military bands in 2020 to separate from the modern “corps style” bands that had previously dominated the open class state competition. Notable military marching bands include Carlisle, White Oak, Lufkin, and Lindale.Today, other than military and show style bands, high school bands largely parallel modern drum and bugle corps. Marching band competitions remain popular in the United States.

Many marching bands are military bands which often derive from instrumentation generally consists of brass, woodwinds and percussion and they typically march forward with consistent straight lines and a constant tempo to facilitate the steady marching of the military unit. Field music units include drum and bugle corps, fanfare bands, pipe bands and fife and drum corps.

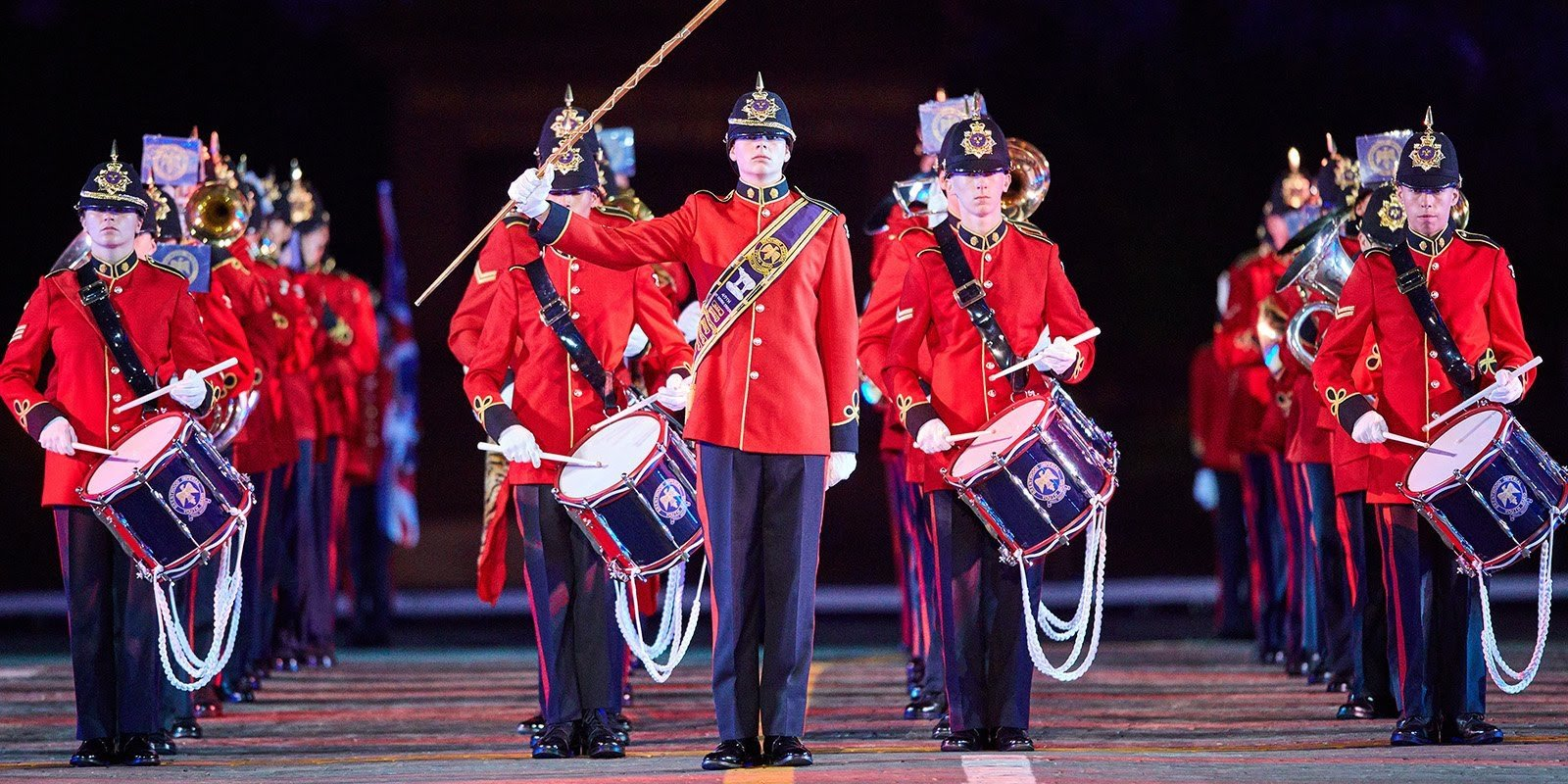
The Brentwood Imperial Youth Band

Military styled marching bands are present in many European countries due to its historical origins in 18th Century European field armies and are present in many other nations due to colonial and foreign influence, including Latin America and South America, South and South-East Asia and the Commonwealth (for example Fiji's Military Forces) and many ex-Soviet nations (with the USSR inheriting the tradition from the Russian Empire).

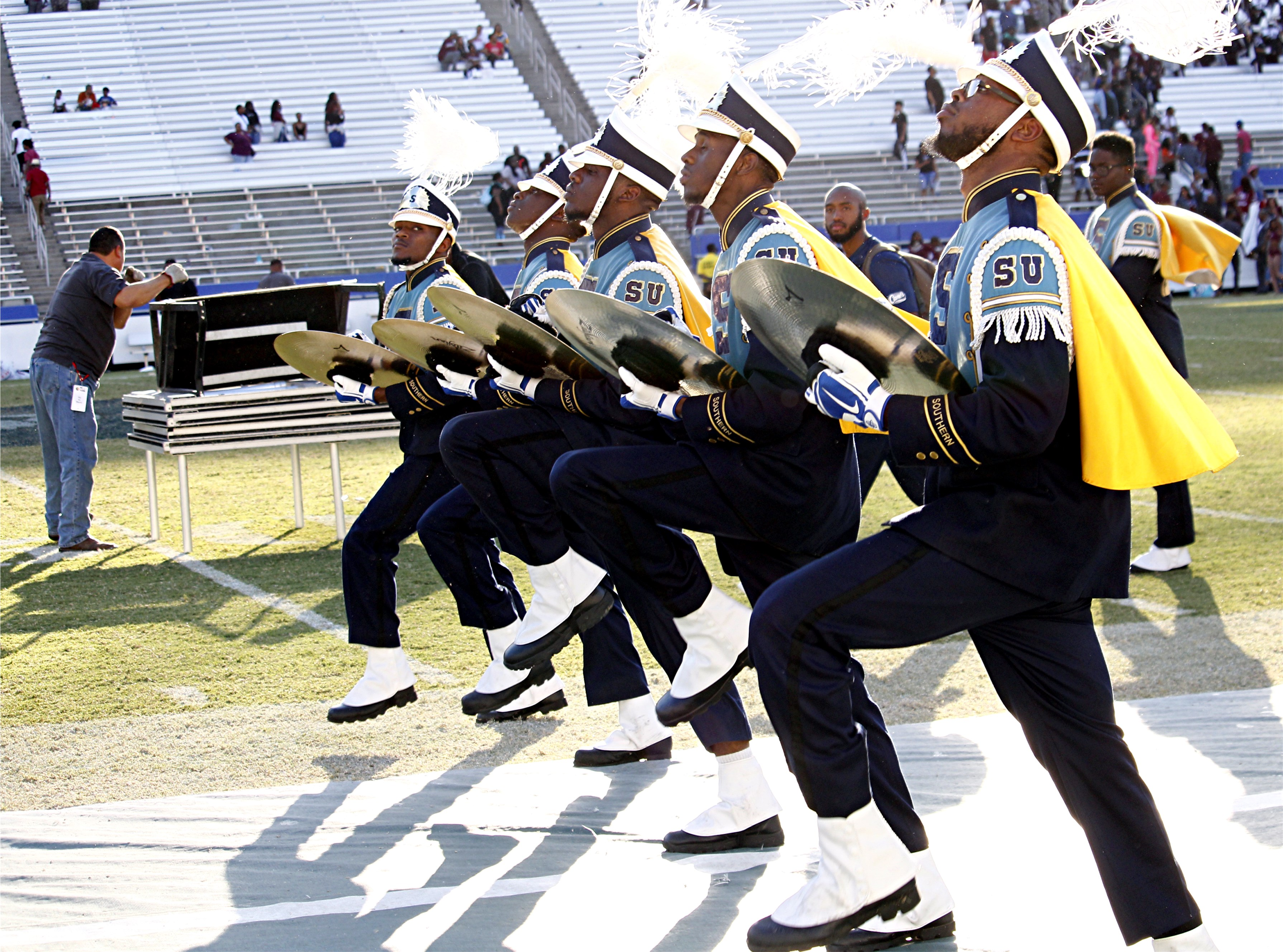
Southern University Human Jukebox (2019)

Many bands perform a wide selection of both traditional styles of music such as marches, with film scores, or adaptations of contemporary music. The goal of each band's performance is different. Some aim for maximum uniformity and precision; others aim to be as entertaining as possible. Some show bands also involve comedic elements, such as scramble bands which generally do not march in time with the music, but, as their name implies, scramble from design to design.

Many bands have auxiliaries that add a visual component to the performance such as a color guard or even dance lines and majorettes. In the US, these auxiliaries may even perform as independent groups (such as winter guard). While military color guards were typically male, band color guards tend to be primarily female, though for both, mixed groups are becoming more common.

Another important part of the marching band is the percussion section. The percussion section is split into two groups being, the drumline (consisting of snare and bass drums), whose job is to keep the tempo for the rest of the band, and the front ensemble, who play instruments that can't be marched (such as marimbas and vibraphones). Military style bands typically have a smaller front ensemble than corps style bands. Unlike the rest of the band who are on the field, the front ensemble are closer to the audience near the front of the field. Similarly to the color guard, the percussion section also has an independent group which is known as percussion ensemble.

A marching band is typically led by one or more drum majors, also called field commanders, who are usually responsible for conducting the band (sometimes using a large baton or mace) and are commonly referred to as the leader of the band. Commands—such as vocal orders, clapping, or a whistle—may be used to issue commands as well.

=== Parade marching ===
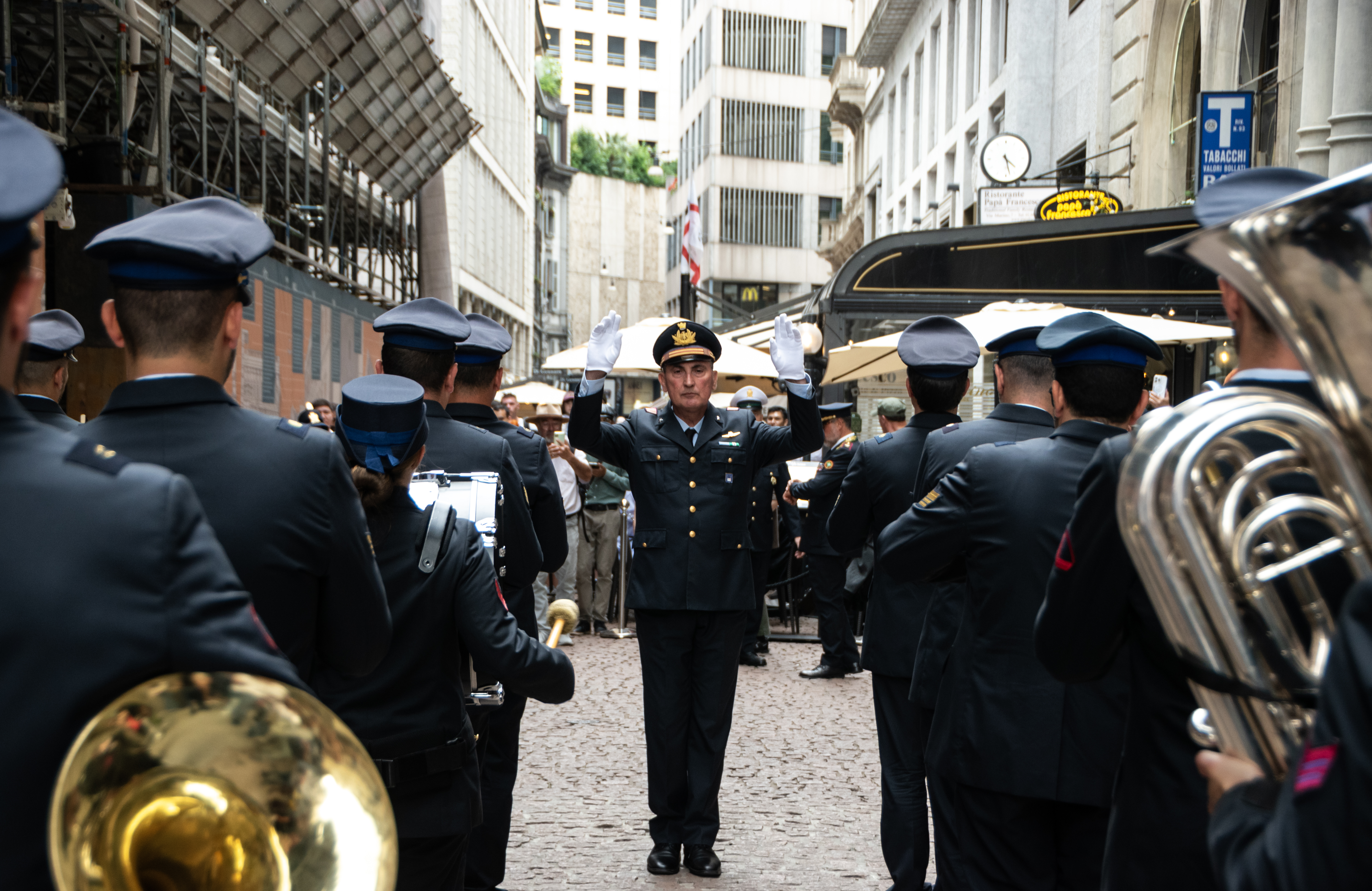
Military marching band performing parade during Festa della Repubblica 2025, Milan, Italy

In parades, bands usually line up in a marching block composed of ranks and files. Each member tries to stay within their given rank and file, and to maintain even spacing with neighboring musicians. It is traditionally the responsibility of the people at the end of each rank and the front of each file to be in the correct location; this allows other band members to use them as a reference, also known as guiding.

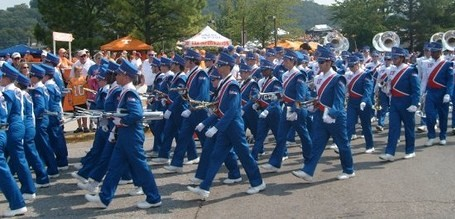
The University of Florida's marching band, The Pride of the Sunshine, performing in a parade

Band members also try to keep a constant pace or step size while marching in parade. Step sizes usually vary between 22 and 30 inches (56–76 cm) per stride. A step size of 22.5 inches is called an 8-to-5 step because the marcher covers five yards (about 4.6 m) in eight steps. A step size of 30 inches is called 6-to-5 because five yards are covered in six steps. Because yard lines on an American football field are five yards apart, exact 8-to-5 and 6-to-5 steps are most useful for field shows.

A drum cadence, sometimes called a walk beat or street beat, is usually played when the band is marching, oftentimes alternating with a song, and is typically how a band keeps time while not playing music. Alternatively, a drum or rim shot may be given on the odd beats to keep the band in step. Between songs and cadences, a roll is usually given to indicate what beat in the measure the band is at. Cadence tempo varies from group to group.

=== Field marching ===
Kansas State University Marching Band marching on the football field at Bill Snyder Family Stadium in Manhattan, Kansas

While playing music during a field show, the band makes a series of formations, called drill, on the field, which may be pictures, geometric shapes, curvilinear designs, or blocks of musicians, although sometimes it may be pure abstract designs using no specific form.

Typically, each band member has an assigned position in each formation. In many show bands and most drum corps, these positions are illustrated in a handheld booklet called a drill book (also known as a dot book). Drill books, or drill charts, show where each person stands during each set of the show. The drill charts include yard lines and hashes as they would be on an actual football field, which shows the band members where to stand relative to the yard lines and hashes. There are many ways of getting from one formation to the next:

- Each member moves independently called scattering or scatter drill.
- All members move together without deforming the formation—called floating.
- Members stay in their lines and arcs, but slowly deform the formation—sometimes called rotating, expanding, or condensing.
- Members break into ranks or squads, each of which performs a maneuver (such as a follow-the-leader) which may or may not be scripted. An unscripted move is sometimes called a rank option.
- Each member performs a specifically scripted move. In these cases, the desired visual effect is often the move itself and not the ending formation.
- Members at an extended halt perform a stationary visual move, such as a ripple (like "the wave") or some sort of choreography, that may propagate throughout the formation of band members.

Each musician in a marching band creates sound waves. The waves from each musician, traveling at the speed of sound, reach the other musicians, field conductors, and listeners at slightly different times. If the distance between musicians is large enough, listeners may perceive waves to be out of phase. Typically, in this case, listeners perceive that one section of the band is playing their parts slightly after another section. This delay effect is informally referred to as ensemble tear or phasing (not to be confused with the music composition technique of the same name).

=== United States ===
Many marching bands serve as entertainment during American football games, which may also be known as pep band. For some college and high school marching bands, this is the primary purpose of the ensemble. Two National Football League teams designate an official marching band: the Washington Commanders, and the Baltimore Ravens. Marching bands are otherwise uncommon at the professional level.

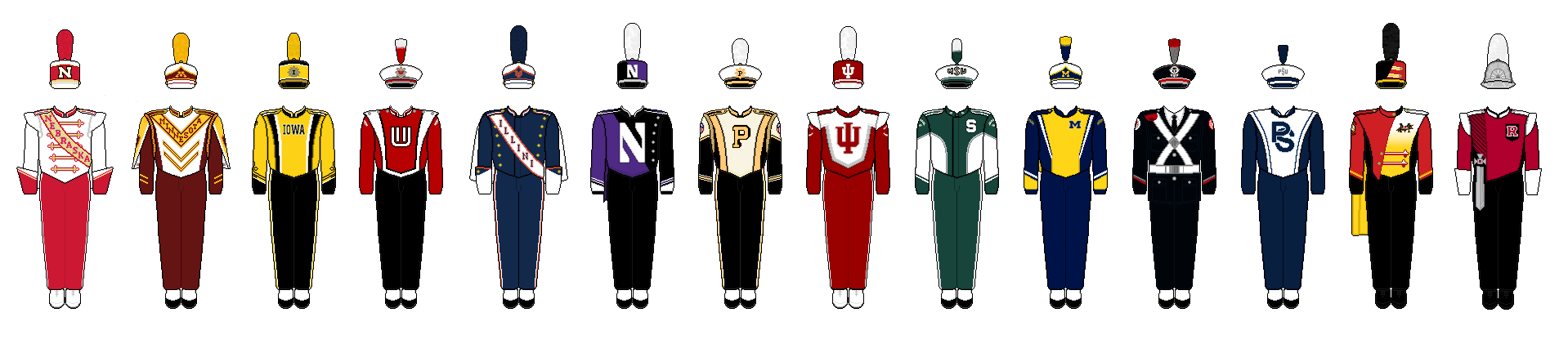
Diagrammed example of marching band uniforms of the Big Ten athletic conference in the United States, excluding teams that joined from the Pac-12.

Nearly all marching band personnel wear some kind of uniform. Military-style uniforms are most common, but there are bands that use everything from matching T-shirts and shorts to formal wear. The school or organization's name, symbol, or colors are commonly applied to uniforms. Uniforms may also have substantially different colors on the front and back, so if band members turn suddenly (flank), the audience sees a striking change of color. Band members at many Ivy League schools wear a jacket and tie while performing. The Southern Methodist University band wear a different combination of jackets, vests, ties, shirts, and pants for each half (changing before halftime) of each game and no clothing or uniform combinations are repeated during the marching season. The Alma College Kiltie Marching Band is famous for wearing kilts made of the official Alma College tartan.

The components of a band uniform are numerous. Common design elements include hats (typically shakos, pith helmets, combination hats or other styles of helmets) with feather plumes, capes, gloves, rank cords, and other embellishments. The USC Spirit of Troy Marching Band and Troy University's Sound of the South Marching Band wear traditional Trojan helmets. It is also common for band uniforms to have a stripe down the leg and light-colored shoes, or spats over dark shoes to emphasize the movement of the legs while marching. Similarly, uniforms may feature additional components which highlight movement of the upper body, such as the "wings" worn by the University of Minnesota's marching band to highlight flanking movements on the field. Competitive bands, however, many times opt for matching uniforms, especially pants and shoes (usually white or black) to hide the visual effect of members who are out of step as seen from a distance. Occasionally, a band forgoes traditional uniforms in favor of costumes that fit the theme of its field show. The costumes may or may not be uniform throughout the band. This kind of specialized uniform change is usually confined to competitive marching bands.

Drum Majors, the field commanders and band directors, usually do not wear the regular band uniform, to better distinguish them from the rest of the band. Some wear more formal outfits or costumes that match the theme of the music, or most commonly a differently designed version of the regular band uniform, often employing different colors (especially white) or features such as capes. Some (especially at the college level) still employ the tall wool-lined shako or much larger bearskin (both often derisively referred to as a "Q-Tip hat"). Sousaphone players may use a military-style beret or entirely forgo the use of a head covering, as most hats may be in the way of the bell. Some auxiliary groups use uniforms that resemble gymnastics outfits: Often, these uniforms are themed, drawing inspiration from the music. Many auxiliary groups change the outfits they use from season to season based on the needs of the band, although some that do also have a "base" uniform for occasions such as parades or other ceremonies.

Bands may compete on criteria such as musicality, uniformity, visual impact, artistic interpretation, and the difficulty of the music and drill. Competition exists at all levels but is most common in the U.S. among secondary school bands and drum and bugle corps. Competitions exist at the national level, such as the Bands of America (BOA) Grand National Championships, as well as in regional circuits.

Although its legitimacy is often called into question, competitive marching band is sometimes considered a sport, due in large part to the physical exertion required in combination with teamwork. Many HBCU marching band fans refer to marching band as marching sport. Sports Illustrated considered the activity a sport in 1987, describing the Drum Corps International World Championships "one of the biggest sporting events of the summer." In the same article, Sports Illustrated quoted basketball coach Bobby Knight, "If a basketball team trained as hard as these kids do, it would be unbelievable. I like to take my players [to watch drum corps] to show them what they can accomplish with hard work and teamwork. Besides, once they see them practice 12 hours a day, my players think I’m a helluva lot easier."

In his presentation to the American College of Sports Medicine's annual meeting in 2009, researcher and exercise physiologist Gary Granata presented research after studying members of the Avon High School Marching Black and Gold, noting "At the top levels of marching band and drum corps, you get a level of competition and athleticism that is equal to a Division I athletic program." Granata further pointed out, "Performers are constantly moving, and often running, at velocities that reach 180 steps or more per minute while playing instruments that weigh up to 40 pounds."

Due to the physical demands, in marching band, there are notable protections that members can use that are similar to those in traditional sports. As sports members use helmets and mouth guards, there are protections for marching band members as well. Such protections are earplugs to protect the ears from ear damage or proper footwear to prevent musculoskeletal injuries.

Due to how close instruments are to the head and how loud they have to be played, so they are heard by the audience, it is important for players to protect their ears. In particular, those who play percussion instruments, without any ear protection like ear plugs, can lead to long lasting damage to the ear. According to an article from the NIH, a survey of 125 musicians demonstrated a loss of hearing at specific frequencies at a rate of 42.4% and bilateral hearing loss at a rate of 19.2%. 51% of participants reported having tinnitus after performing, while 28% reported pain in ears. Of the participants included in this study, only 2% reported using ear protection.

According to a study conducted by Susan Harman, 86 musicians who participated in the Baltimore Colts band were surveyed about their physical status at the conclusion of their season. Of the 20 flag line members, 36% and 22% reported upper and lower extremity pains respectively, while 65% and 35% musicians reported upper and lower extremity pains respectively. Thus, leading to the conclusion that the physical demands on the members are significant. Members of the National Athletic Trainers' Association (NATA) recommend members participate in proper physical warm-ups before rehearsals, as well as, wearing proper footwear to help prevent injuries.

In the article, “Sun Exposure And Protection Practices Among Florida College Marching Band Members and Alumni: A Cross-Sectional Study”, members of colleges in Florida were asked about the amount of sunscreen they use during practices and performances. Members described their habits in regards to use of sun protection products, which includes hats, shirts, and sunscreen. Despite the increased use of products, members noted a 1.66% increase in melanoma diagnoses, which proves that skin protection is an important component.

According to The Effects of Participation in Marching Band on Physical Activity and Physical Fitness in College Aged Men and Women, 21 members of the University of Rhode Island Marching band were tested during the course of a season. Their body composition and VO2max were studied at the beginning and end of the season. The study found that there were substantial changes to reinforce the notion that marching band is indeed a sport due to the rigorous aerobic exertion of the members. At the beginning of the season, members recorded a VO2max level of 38.5 vs. 40.8.

Performers’ metabolic rates matched those of marathon runners halfway through a marathon, while the heart rate was more along the lines of someone who was running a "400 or 800-meter dash."

Performance styles range from traditional block marching to elaborate productions with evolving drill patterns.

WAMSB (World Association of Marching Show Bands) is an international organization holding many competitions throughout the world. Its World Championships are held annually in the summer in a different country. Past host nations include Canada, Brazil, Japan, Malaysia, Denmark, Germany, Italy, & Australia. WAMSB sanctioned events happen in 32 nations.

In the United States, there are two national competition circuits in which bands can compete: Bands of America and the United States Scholastic Band Association (USSBA, more commonly referred to as USBands), involving over 700 high school bands compete during the Fall season with bands of similar size and talent. Each competition provides approximately 40 professional judges who give feedback on the show's programming and design. At the season's end, the top 50 bands are invited to compete in the US Scholastic Band Championship, which is hosted at a college or professional stadium.

Warren G. Harding, 29th President of the United States, was in a marching band as a teenager and later famously organized bands.During his campaign for president he often would join in local marching bands on the campaign trail, playing the sousaphone.

Bill Clinton, 42nd President of the United States, was also a member of a marching band in high school. He attended Hot Springs High School in Arkansas and performed as a saxophone player while later serving as drum major for the band.

=== Canada ===
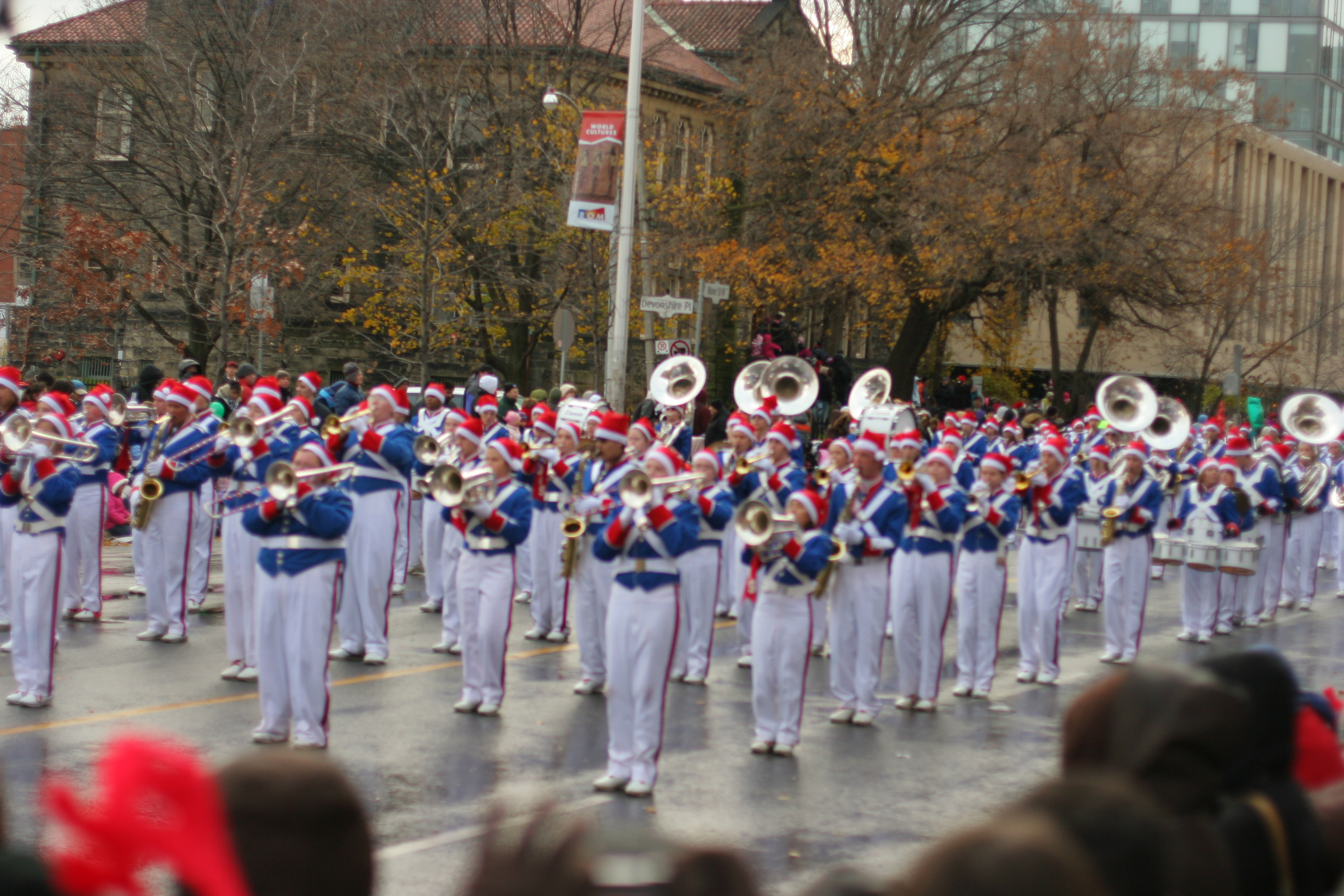
A marching band during the 2008 Toronto Santa Claus Parade.

Most marching bands in Canada are organized by the Canadian Band Association or by Canadian universities:

- Royal Military College of Canada Bands
- Simon Fraser University Pipe Band
- Western Mustang Band
- Lady Godiva Memorial Bnad

Although many bands have still retained the British tradition for marching bands, most have also adopted the style used by their American counterparts. Canadian military bands are often associated with civilian marching bands. Many of the civilian marching bands that exist today, such as the Oshawa Civic Band, The Concert Band of Cobourg and the Toronto Signals Band, have military roots and were formerly Canadian Army bands. In the case of the aforementioned bands, their lineage is shared with the bands of The Ontario Regiment, the 6th Northumberland Militia and the 2nd Armoured Divisional Signals Regiment respectively. In the early to mid-20th century, the Canadian Forces maintained drum and bugle corps, which were similar in instrumentation and organization to civilian marching bands.

=== Taiwan ===
In Taiwan, the National Marching Band Association is the main organizer of local marching bands in the country. It is currently located at its headquarters in the Neihu District of Taipei City. The Taipei First Girls' High School currently sports one of the most acclaimed marching bands in the country.

=== Malaysia ===
The first marching bands were introduced in Malaysia during the British colonial period and has since grown and increased its importance. The most common are found in the Malaysian Armed Forces, however, in recent years, there has been a rise in the number of show bands and drum corps in the country. Although the Ministry of Education organizes most school marching bands, other organizations have made consistent efforts to organize local marching bands.

=== Russia ===
In Russia, there are not many school or local marching bands in existence, with most being government-sponsored military and police bands, as well as several bands operated by the local governments. The marching bands of the Russian Armed Forces are organized by the Military Band Service in the Ministry of Defence. Also known as Marshiruyushchiy orkestr (loosely translated to Марширующий оркестр, which means Marching Orchestra in Russian), notable Russian marching bands include the Band and Corps of Drums of the Moscow Military Music College, whose cadets are famous for setting the pace for the annual Victory Day Parades on Red Square. These types of bands only came into existence after 1991 when the Soviet Union ceased to exist. During the Soviet era, civilian like marching bands were extremely rare, with one of the only non-military bands having been employed in the late 1930s and early 1940s during National Sports Day parades in the capital of Moscow. Other Russian marching bands include the Drummers Group of the Boarding School for Girls of the Ministry of Defense of Russia and the Moscow & District Pipe Band. The country has hosted many marching band tattoos within the last 70 years, including the Spasskaya Tower Military Music Festival and Tattoo in Moscow and the Amur Waves International Military Bands Festival in Khabarovsk.

=== Singapore ===
The traditions of both the Singapore Police Force Band and the Singapore Armed Forces Bands soon inspired the creation of the Singaporean marching band tradition. By the 1960s, school and college marching bands, corps of drums and drum and bugle corps began to be commonplace (the latter in cadet units), as well as bands of youth uniformed organizations and universities, all following the armed forces pattern and British and Malayan (later Malaysian) precedence. The People's Association became the first civilian organization to form a dedicated marching band in 1965–66, and the Ministry of Education followed suit with a teachers' band made up of band instructors. Today the Ministry of Education is responsible for overall control over the school, college, university and polytechnic bands within Singapore, with two dedicated cadet bands.

Some of Singapore's oldest high school marching bands are from the Raffles' Institution, St. Joseph's Institution, Victoria School, Bukit Panjang Government HS and the Anglo-Chinese School.

The SPF has the country's three uniformed pipe bands, the Women's Police, SPF and Gurkha Contingent Pipe Bands, all raised in the late 1960s. Civilian pipe bands were formerly present in the PA, Boys Brigade and the Port of Singapore Authority.

=== United Kingdom ===
Marching bands - especiallu corps of drums are an important fixture in loyalist and some republican communities in Scotland and in Northern Ireland. Loyalist marching bands typically partake in Orange walks. In Scotland, the tradition of the military style pipe band has been maintained.

== See also ==
- Marching arts
- Tournament of Bands
- List of college marching bands in the United States
- List of marching bands
- Western Band Association
- Marching (sport)
- Booster club
