= Texas A&M University Century Singers =

The Texas A&M University Century Singers are Texas A&M University's 100 member mixed choral group. The ensemble is Texas A&M's first mixed choir, and is the university's second oldest choral group. The Century Singers perform regularly throughout the Bryan/College Station community and annually throughout the State of Texas. The choir is currently under direction of Mr. Thomas Gerber, and is accompanied by Ms. Jesse Novak.

== History ==
The group was formed in 1970, soon after the previously all male university began accepting undergraduate female students. Bob Jarvis, a freshman engineering student at the time, proposed the group to Bob (Robert L.) Boone, then director of the famed all male Singing Cadets, the university's only other choral group at the time. Bob Boone agreed to direct a mixed choir if Bob Jarvis would pull it together. With the help of another entering freshman, Lee Edmundson, Bob Jarvis blanketed the campus with ads for the first meeting of a new choral group dubbed "The New Tradition Singers." That first meeting, held 19 February 1970, in the Singing Cadet room (119 of G. Rollie White Colosseum) was attended by a fairly even mix of about 60 male and female students interested in singing choral music. Bob Boone was ready with music, and the singing commenced immediately. Bob Jarvis was soon elected to be the new organization's first president, and Bob Boone became its first director. The organization was taken under the Memorial Student Center official student organization umbrella the following school year with approximately 60 members and the "New Tradition Singer" name. Its first public appearance was for the Thanksgiving service in All Faiths Chapel on campus on 23 November 1970, singing a Wallace Hornibrook arrangement for combined choirs of "We Gather Together."

In the late 1970s Bob Boone, affectionately known throughout the growing A&M vocal music program as "Coach," turned over direction of the group to Patricia Fleitas, and the group changed its name in 1976 to "The Century Singers" in commemoration of Texas A&M University's Centennial.

In the mid-1980s its direction was taken over by Jess Wade III until 2013 when he retired.

Eric Posada was hired in July 2013. During his tenure, the chorus obtained state recognition. In January 2014, Century Singers performed in Houston with the Nordic Choir, conducted by Dr. Allen Hightower. That summer the choir traveled across Germany. In spring 2015, Posada conducted Ola Gjeilo’s “Sunrise Mass” with the Brazos Valley Symphony and the A&M Orchestra. He completed his dissertation, with the Century Singers’ help, and officially became Dr. Posada. The choir then performed at Carnegie Hall in March 2016. For the performance, Michael John Trotta’s “Tu Solo Remedio” was commissioned and translated by Posada. At the performance, Trotta was in attendance and composer Shawn Kirchner joined the choir on-stage and accompanied them on his blue-grass composition “I’ll Be On My Way”. In the summer of 2016, due to the drama occurring in the CAO, Dr. Posada made the decision to leave. Their recording of “In Memoriam” has over 6,300 views.

Travis Angel, a longtime high school choir director, became the interim director for the 2016-17 school year, accepting a full time position in the fall of 2017. He retired in 2022.

Thomas Gerber became the director in 2022 and led the choir on a European tour of Spain and Portugal in 2023.

== Music ==
The Century Singers historically sing a wide variety of choral literature. Their repertoire includes Christian hymns and gospel music, as well as traditional and contemporary choral works. Musical selections vary in their origins, spanning across continents and centuries. The choir has collaborated with the Brazos Valley Symphony Orchestra in performances of several major works including Carl Orff's Carmina Burana, Brahm's Ein Deutsches Requiem, and Gjeilo's Sunrise Mass.

== Organization ==
The Century Singers hold auditions twice each school year at the beginning of each semester and throughout the summer months. Membership is open to any Texas A&M student both undergraduate and graduate. The choir is one of three within Texas A&M. The Century Singers rehearse in Texas A&M's Memorial Student Center along with the all-female Women's Chorus and the all-male Singing Cadets. The group is represented by a seven-member Executive Officer Board who meet weekly with the director to make plans and decisions for future Century Singers activities.

In addition to their duties as a choral performance group, the Century Singers also function socially as one of Texas A&M's recognized student organizations. Members have the opportunity to participate in a wide variety of social events including overnight retreats and weekly activities such as ice skating, movie and game nights, and group dinners. Involvement in both social gathering and formal rehearsals brings Century Singers together as Aggies, musicians, and friends.

== History References ==
"The Battalion," Vol. 66, No. 31, 22 October 1971. (Texas A&M University, College Station, Texas, student newspaper.)

== See also ==
- Fightin' Texas Aggie Band
- Texas A&M Singing Cadets
- Texas A&M Wind Symphony
