= Dot book =

Small notebook

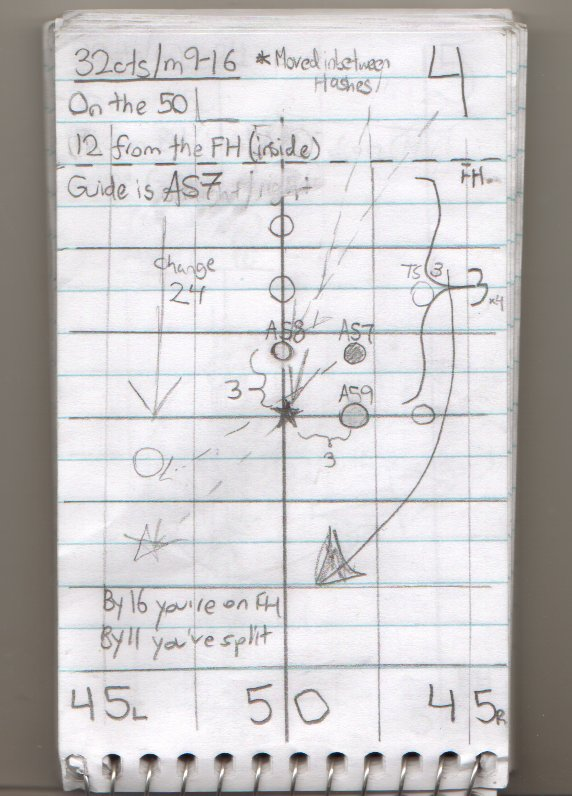
An example of a complex dot book. Note how it is upside down: this aids in the reading of the book when it is strung around the neck. This particular player is AS10 (Alto saxophone 10)

A dot book (also dotbook or dot-book or drill book) is a small notebook utilized by marching bands (especially high school show bands and drum corps) in order to aid the learning of formations on a field. The dot book was invented by Leslie Allard, a prominent high school band instructor and all-star percussionist. The name is derived from the use of dots on drill sheets which symbolize players on the field: a dot book focuses on the owner's particular dots and other marchers the player may have to guide (use to determine an adjusted location).

The general layout of a dot book contains the "longitudes" and "latitudes" of an American football field. However, a cartesian coordinate system (x/y) is rarely used, rather an alternative system of plotting players as dots on a grid and some jargon is used. For instance, a player may write: "3 inside 45R and 5 in front BH." This would mean that the player is 3 steps inside (towards the 50 yard line) from the 45th yard line from the right side (facing the press box) and is five steps in front of the back hash (see Field and players of American football for an explanation of terms).

Many times, however, a person's own dot book will contain their own specialized shorthand to represent their location on the field. Dot books can vary from simple (providing only the location of the marcher) to complex (also providing the location of nearby marchers whom you are guiding). This poses problems when players are switched between positions on the field: switching dot books is often difficult and many times players end up rewriting their dot books.

Dot books are considered essential by many high school band instructors to the progress of drill.

== From drill sheet to dot book ==
This is a sample page of a pack of drill sheets. The owner of this page is AS10, and their dot on the field has been circled accordingly. After looking at this page, AS10 wrote in their page on the dot book at the top of this article. Several notable features:

- Reversal of field - This is because all players face the "box" or "Director Viewpoint" of a field. Therefore, a player facing the correct direction will normally never view the field in this way (which is backwards).
- Smallness of dot book - Drill sheets are unwieldy to handle because of their size. The dot book overcomes this limitation through loss of data: by only focusing on your dot, and the dots that are around it, you can eliminate most of the other dots. In many ways, a dot book is simply a magnification of a small area of a drill sheet.
- Division of five yards into eight steps: this is called an eight to five step.

== Coordinate Sheets ==
An alternative to the dot book is the coordinate sheet. Like dot books, coordinate sheets are small and meant to be worn around the neck on a lanyard. Coordinate sheets are set up as a list of the member's places on the field, given in coordinates (such as 5 steps inside the right 45 yard line and 2.25 steps in front of the Home hash), each "set" numbered. Also on the sheet is the number of steps it takes to go from one set to another, but this isn't written plainly. Set 1 always has a "0" by it. If it should take sixteen counts to move to the next set, a "16" will be placed next to Set 2's coordinates. If it should take eight counts to move to the third set, a "24" is next to Set 3's coordinates.
