= A. R. Casavant =

American marching band leader

A.R. Casavant
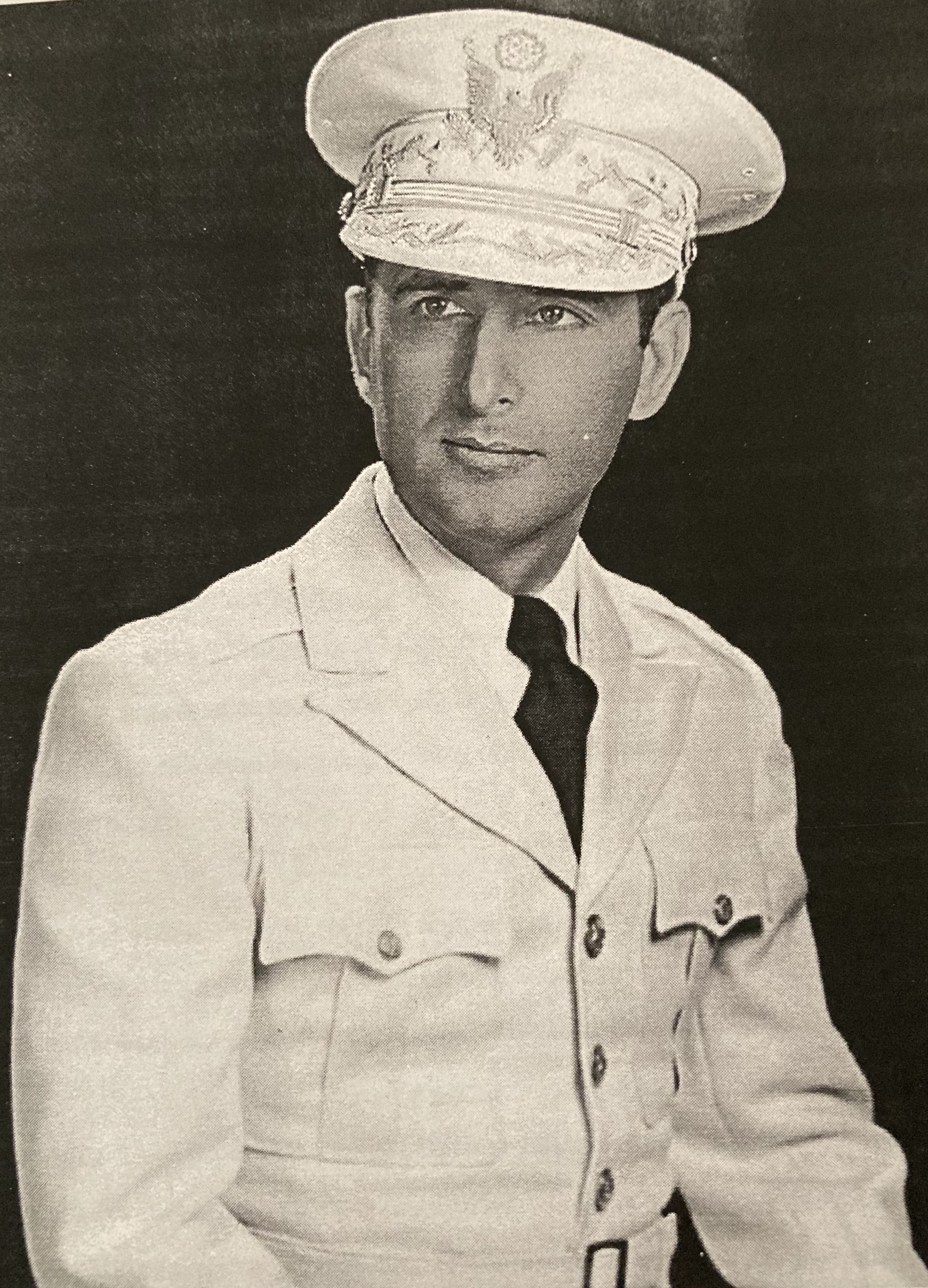
- A.R. Casavant, marching band director, in his "ice cream suit"

Background information
- Also known as: "Cas"
- Born: February 13, 1917; Everett, Massachusetts
- Died: March 24, 2002 Chattanooga, Tennessee
- Occupations: Marching band director, inventor of precision drill
- Instrument: Trumpet
- Years active: 1938–1997
- Spouse: Mary Nancye (Ewing) Casavant

Albert Richard "Cas" Casavant (1917–2002) was an American marching band leader, and innovator credited with the creation of the precision drill. Casavant published more than 40 books on the precision drill, exhibition marching and percussion cadences. He was awarded six patents on inventions for marching band equipment, marketed through his company ARC Products. He changed the theory and practice of the marching band in America beginning in the 1950's, and his influence continues today.

== Background and training ==
A.R. Casavant was born in Everett, Massachusetts, on February 13, 1917. His parents moved to Warren, Ohio, where he lived until his high school graduation in 1935. He played trumpet in the school band and in the community bands that flourished in the Midwest at the time.

Casavant attended Tennessee Military Institute as a cadet. While still a cadet, he took over the school marching band, and, after graduating in 1938, remained as an instructor while attending the University of Tennessee at Knoxville on a track scholarship. In 1938 Casavant also started the band program at McMinn County High School in Athens, Tennessee. Casavant later stated, "the fundamental drill taught at TMI gave me my first contact with the idea of precision of group movement."

Casavant originally moved to Chattanooga in 1943 to work as an estimator at a steel foundry, but found he could not stay away from music. He played trumpet professionally in several groups, including the Chattanooga Symphony and Opera.

== Teaching ==
Casavant was convinced by colleagues to join the Chattanooga School System in 1944 teaching instrumental music and assisting the band leader at Chattanooga High School (commonly known as City High). From 1944 to 1947, he also attended the University of Tennessee at Chattanooga where he received Bachelor of Science and Bachelor of Arts degrees in 1947.

When Casavant arrived at Chattanooga City High School in 1944, the band director was Colonel Ira Summers, a Spanish-American War veteran. Summers was a bugler who had toured the world in the famous Buffalo Bill's Cowboy Band.

The Chattanooga high school band itself was officially an ROTC unit, and Casavant described Summers as having a military mentality toward printed music: "it was expendable." One of Casavant's first undertakings was to stock the school library with published sheet music, and he focused on teaching band members sight-reading.

He took over a band with few instruments and little rehearsal time and in a few years built it into a marching band with a national reputation. Under Casavant's baton the Chattanooga High School Band never lost a competition.

Casavant also founded two new bands in the nearby towns of East Ridge Tennessee and Rossville, Georgia.

== Development of precision drill ==
Casavant disapproved of a marching band style common at the time called pageantry, scattering from one formation to another at the command of a drum major (or a signal like a revolver shot from the sidelines). It appeared anarchic; there might be little or no coordination with the music. "The most asinine type of work that I'd ever heard of," Casavant reportedly remarked. Pageantry finds a modern analog in sardonic scramble bands.

Casavant had experience of military drill, and American Legion drum corps. He began to synthesize a method of marching and maneuvering that drew on the best that each had to offer, an eclectic mix which incorporated dance, theater, and the arts as well, with a focus on crisp geometric forms.

Casavant's drill was based on research and scholarship. He accumulated a library that grew to include every American, Canadian, and British military marching manual published, as well as books on mathematics, engineering, kineaology, physical education, and theater. His extensive collection is now part of the Indiana University of Pennsylvania music library.

Casavant's technique, publicized in his books, articles, and teaching, established a "path vocabulary:" a method of getting from one place to another geometrically, without scattering. Casavant himself wrote that the precision drill is not so much a style of drill, nor a particular system: it is a "basic concept or attitude," focusing on the individual within the unit:

Precision Drill is a concept of marching. It is a method to change the direction of a formation, to change the organization within the formation or to change from one formation to another. Precision Marching, or Precision Execution, refers to a standard of execution. Precision Execution is that execution that very few attain--the perfection of human uniformity in movement. Precision Marching is that execution when the difference in position and movement of individuals is not discernable by the human eye--above the tolerance of an experienced judge [emphasis in original].

Casavant's initial experiments with what came to be called precision drill involved the girls' drill teams at Chattanooga High school in 1947, and later applied to the school's marching band in 1951. The results appeared in his first text, A Manual of Close Order Drill. Casavant's precision drill came to the attention of other marching band directors nationwide when in 1955, the marching band was asked to perform on national television during a Washington Redskins game.

== Notable students ==
Among Casavant's students was Dale Clevenger, later principal French horn of the Chicago Symphony Orchestra for 47 years. Clevinger's obituary noted that Casavant had played him records of the Chicago Symphony during the school lunch hour. In an interview Clevenger recalled that Casavant tried talking students out of becoming musicians, because "if he could talk them out of a career in music they did not belong in the profession."

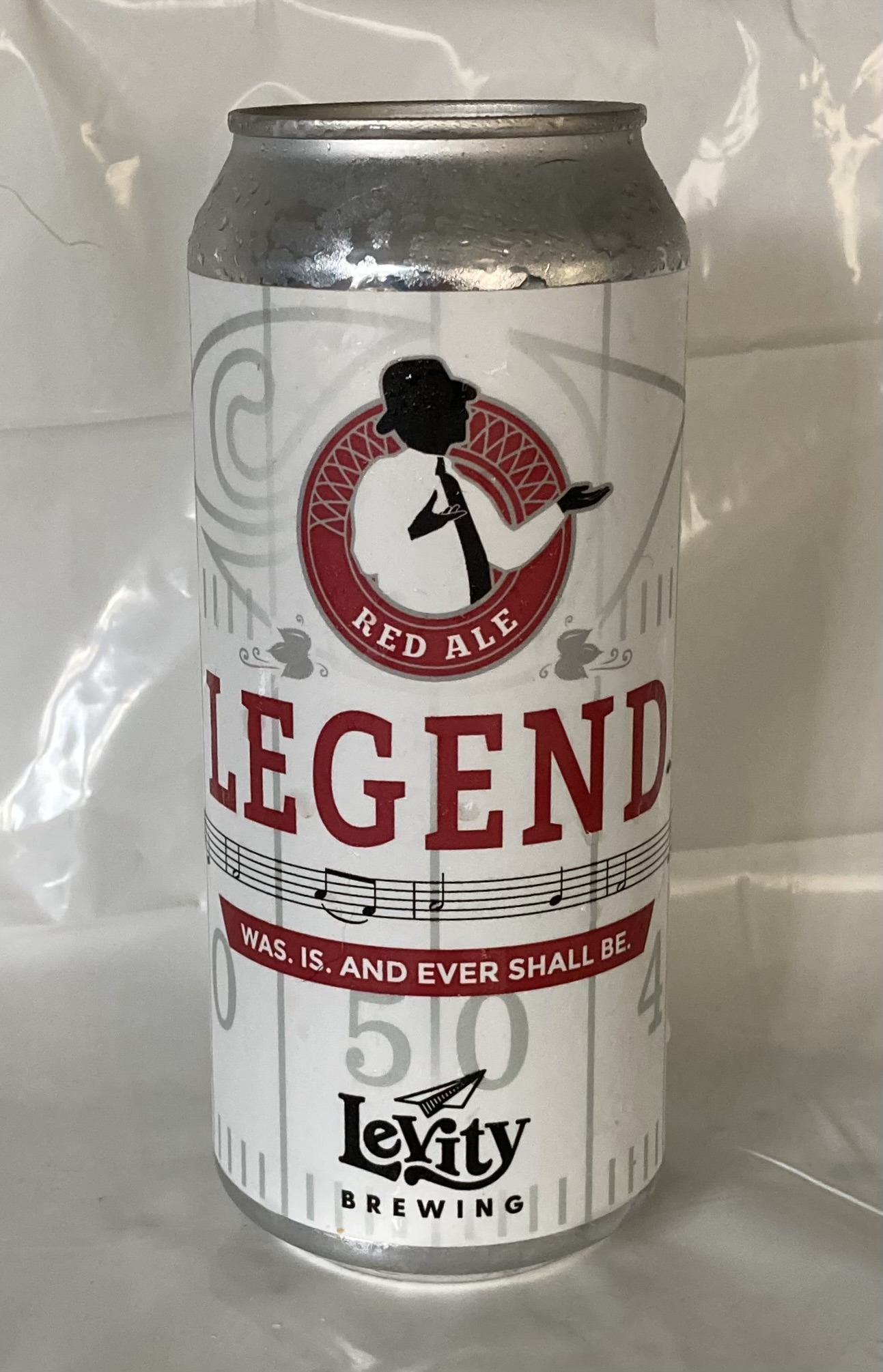
Tribute to Charles Casavant in his trademark bowler hat from IUP marching band alumni

One of his sons, Charles Casavant, followed in his father's footsteps, serving for over 25 years as marching band director for Indiana University of Pennsylvania.

== Honors and legacy ==
Casavant (assisted by his son) conducted summer workshops at more than 100 American colleges and taught marching units from all over the world, including Canada, Japan, Ireland, England, South America, Australia and New Zealand. These workshops, known as "Casavant Cavalcade" further publicized Casavant's precision drill nationally and internationally.

Casavant also published over 40 books on precision drill, exhibition marching, percussion, and other topics. Initially he published under his own imprint, ARC Publishing; later, Southern Music Company reissued his first books and published all future volumes. Casavant published his last article on marching band drill at age 80, in 1997.

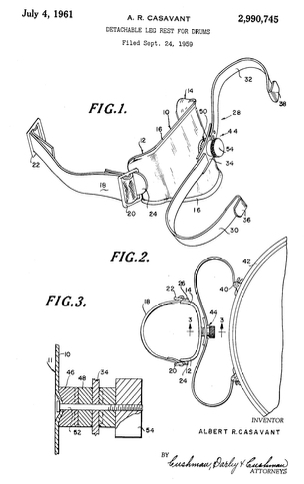
Patent awarded to A.R. Casavant for detachable drum rest, filed 1959; awarded 1961

Several of his six patented inventions for marching band accessories are still in use today, including yokes and carriers for drums, tubas, other instruments, and flags; a leg rest for snare and tenor drums; and a "Tone Collar" for moderating the pitch of drums.

In 1979, Casavant was appointed chair of the National Band Association marching band committee, and the next year elected Tennessee Bandmaster of the Year. Casavant was inducted into the Tennessee Bandmasters Hall of Fame on October 25, 1980, at halftime during a nationally televised Memphis State University-Florida State University game.

== Family life and death ==
While a student at Tennessee Military Institute, Casavant met Sweetwater, Tennessee native Mary Nancye Ewing, and the two were married in 1939. In 63 years of marriage they parented five children.

In 2000 Casavant was diagnosed with cancer (multiple myeloma). After battling the disease for two years, he died on March 24, 2002. He was buried on March 26, 2002, at Chattanooga Memorial Park, with his former band and music students and members of the Chattanooga High School girl's drill team serving as honorary pallbearers.
