= Carlisle High School =

Carlisle High School may refer to:

- Carlisle High School (Arkansas)
- Carlisle High School (Carlisle, Ohio)
- Carlisle High School (Carlisle, Pennsylvania)

== See also ==
- Carlisle & County High School for Girls, England
- Concord-Carlisle High School, Concord, Massachusetts
