= Follow-the-leader =

In a marching band, follow-the-leader is a visual effect in which one band member follows the next. The move can be from side to side, front to back, or diagonal. It usually occurred when band members break into ranks/squads that perform a specific maneuver. Advanced follow-the-leader movements may have Bézier curves.
