= Texas A&M Singing Cadets =

Choir at Texas A&M University

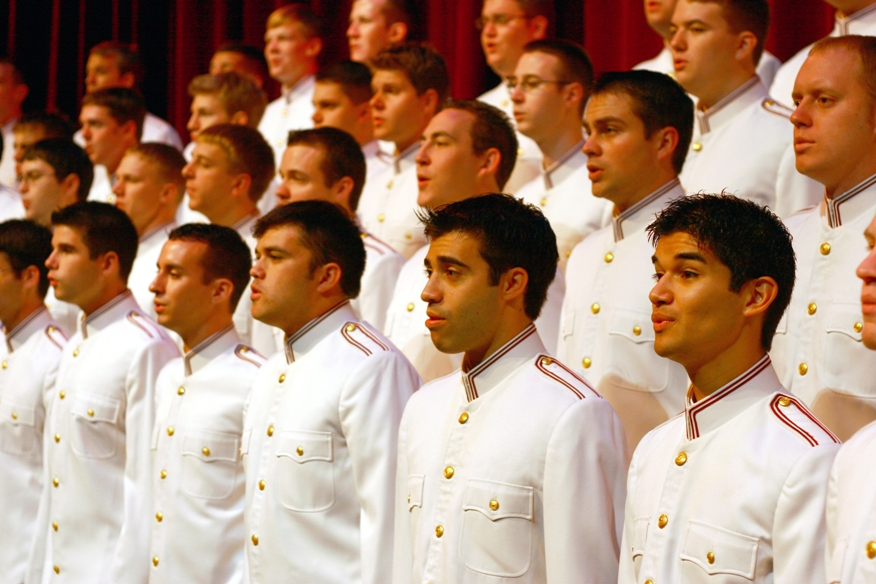
The Texas A&M University Singing Cadets

The Texas A&M Singing Cadets are a male choral group at Texas A&M University. Nicknamed "The Voice of Aggieland", the Singing Cadets have been touring for 109 seasons, with their roots in a glee club founded on the A&M campus in 1893. The Singing Cadets are one of the oldest collegiate singing organizations in the world. They have toured both in America and abroad and have earned recognition by doing so, including invitations to sing for American presidents. Contrary to their name, the Singing Cadets are not all members of the Corps of Cadets and have not been since 1963, when the university as a whole ceased mandating Corps membership. Between 1996 and 2006, the Singing Cadets traveled over 35,000 miles and performed more than 450 concerts worldwide.

== History ==
The first record of a singing organization at Texas A&M (then known as the Agricultural and Mechanical College of Texas) was in 1893. The nine-member glee club was composed of both students and faculty and was led by Professor A.M. Soule. The group grew to around twenty members through the turn of the century. Their first recorded field trip was in 1905 to Houston, Texas, where they participated in a four hundred member chorus. Other tours in this period included a trip to Fort Worth in 1907, where they met noted violinist Fritz Kreisler. One year later, the director of the group, Professor T.P. Junkin, left the A&M Glee Club.

The next paradigm shift came in 1910 when it was reorganized by F.D. Steger, and subsequently performed for a number of audiences throughout Texas. After several restructuring efforts and directors, the organization laid down an official constitution during the 1937-1938 school year. The Cadets entered the national spotlight when they performed at the 1939 Sugar Bowl game. After A&M professor J. J. Woolket became director in 1940, the chorus was renamed the "Singing Cadets" following a naming contest. Under his direction the group's constitution, the Singing Cadet Handbook, was penned. For these reasons he is called the "Father of the Singing Cadets". The Singing Cadets' first full-time director, Richard Jenkins, raised the organization's profile though a series of tours throughout the American South. Under his aegis in 1942, the group provided choral music for the propaganda film We've Never Been Licked.

Sweater Patch from 1950s

The Singing Cadets next long-term director, William Turner, held the post for fifteen years. By the early 1950s membership had stabilized at around sixty members. They performed primarily in Texas, and made a trip to Mexico in 1952. The group garnered prestige and attention by singing in front of the Texas Legislature several times.

In 1960, the Singing Cadets next director, Robert L. Boone, expanded the group's national recognition. The group performed its first telecast in 1963 during the nationally televised Miss Teenage America pageant. For the next 8 years, the group served as contestant escorts, performers, and background for the show. They met Sergio Franchi during the December 10, 1970, pageant. Subsequently, the group appeared on The Ed Sullivan Show with Sergio Franchi singing "No Man is An Island" on January 24, 1971. However, they did not get to appear on a second solo performance because an earlier show ran over the allotted time; they were promised to make a return, but Sullivan died before that was able to happen. They did, however, release a 45 rpm single "No Man Is An Island" accompanying Franchi in the same year. Later that year, the Singing Cadets were invited to the White House by Senator John Tower to sing for numerous dignitaries, including President Richard Nixon.

The Singing Cadets took their first trip overseas in 1974 to Romania as part of a goodwill tour sponsored by the State Department, performing several shows over a 3 week period. The Cadets accompanied the Aggie Band onto Kyle Field during the halftime of football games during special occasions of the university, such as the centennial celebration of Texas A&M University (1976), and in 1980 to dedicate the expansion of the football stadium.

Under Boone's direction, the Singing Cadets won several international singing competitions. They won the silver medal in an International Choral Festival in Hawaii in 1979. In 1983 they received the silver medal in Mexico. In 1993, they returned to Hawaii, taking the gold medal. Other major tours during the 1980s included several occasions marking the Texas sesquicentennial anniversary in 1986, and European tours in 1987 and 1989. In 2004, the Singing Cadets journeyed to Australia, and they sang the Australian national anthem (Advance Australia Fair) on the first concert of that tour. In May 2006, the Cadets performed at the White House at the invitation of President George W. Bush for an event to honor America's returning athletes from the 2006 Winter Olympics. Also in 2006, the cadets performed at the Miss Texas Pageant. In its 2006-2007 season, the Cadets performed over sixty concerts in the United States, plus a tour to South America during the summer, where they traveled to Argentina, Uruguay and Brazil. The Singing Cadets toured South Africa in 2010, China in 2013, Eastern Europe in 2016, Greece and Bulgaria in 2019, Greece in 2023, and will tour Malaysia and Hong Kong in 2025.

== Music ==
The Singing Cadets album, Centennial

The Singing Cadets have sung a wide variety of music throughout their history. Their repertoire has included Christian hymns and gospel music, as well as Texas A&M school songs such as the Aggie War Hymn. Musical selections have varied through the decades, although Southern songs and songs from the 1940s, 1950s, and 1960s remain perennial favorites.

Currently, eight recordings produced by the Singing Cadets are available for purchase. In chronological order, the titles are: God Bless the USA, Live from South America, Tradition; Duty, Honor, Country: A Tribute to President Bush, Remembrance, Centennial, Let Freedom Ring, and Kennedy Center.

== Organization ==
Members of the Corps of Cadets make up a small minority of the Singing Cadets; the group dropped Corps membership as a requirement in 1963. The Singing Cadets holds auditions twice each school year, with membership open to any Texas A&M student. The choir is one of three within Texas A&M; the others are the all-SSA Women's Chorus and the co-ed Century Singers. All three practice in the Music Activities Center (MAC).

The group is typically backed by a pianist and conducted by a director, and regularly are accompanied by instruments, including electric guitar, drums and bass guitar. The Singing Cadets use pantomime to accompany their music, incorporating a number of forms of entertainment into their concerts. Barbershop quartet side groups called The Aggienizors and The Quad perform at some shows, as entertainment between the main musical numbers. During these performances, it is traditional that the Director step off-stage.

Presently, the Singing Cadets go on a ten-day "winter tour" before the start of the spring semester and three weekend "spring tours" during the spring semester across the state, concluding with a "national tour" to an out-of-state location, or an "international tour" every three years to an international location. The Singing Cadets perform 70-80 concerts a year.

== Directors ==
- Professor A. M. Soule
- Professor Tyrrel
- Professor T. P. Junkin
- F. D. Steger
- D. Ford
- K. H. Beach
- E. W. Glenn
- Professor J. J. Woolket
- Richard W. Jenkins
- Ewell Porter
- William M. Turner
- Robert "Coach" L. Boone
- David L. Kipp
