= Director of bands =

A director of bands is the head figure of a marching or concert form of bands, a person who leads a musical ensemble. The director, by history and tradition, must know all the concepts of music and must be able to teach all different kinds of instrumental musicians in order to make a performance at a certain dateline before the scheduled performance.

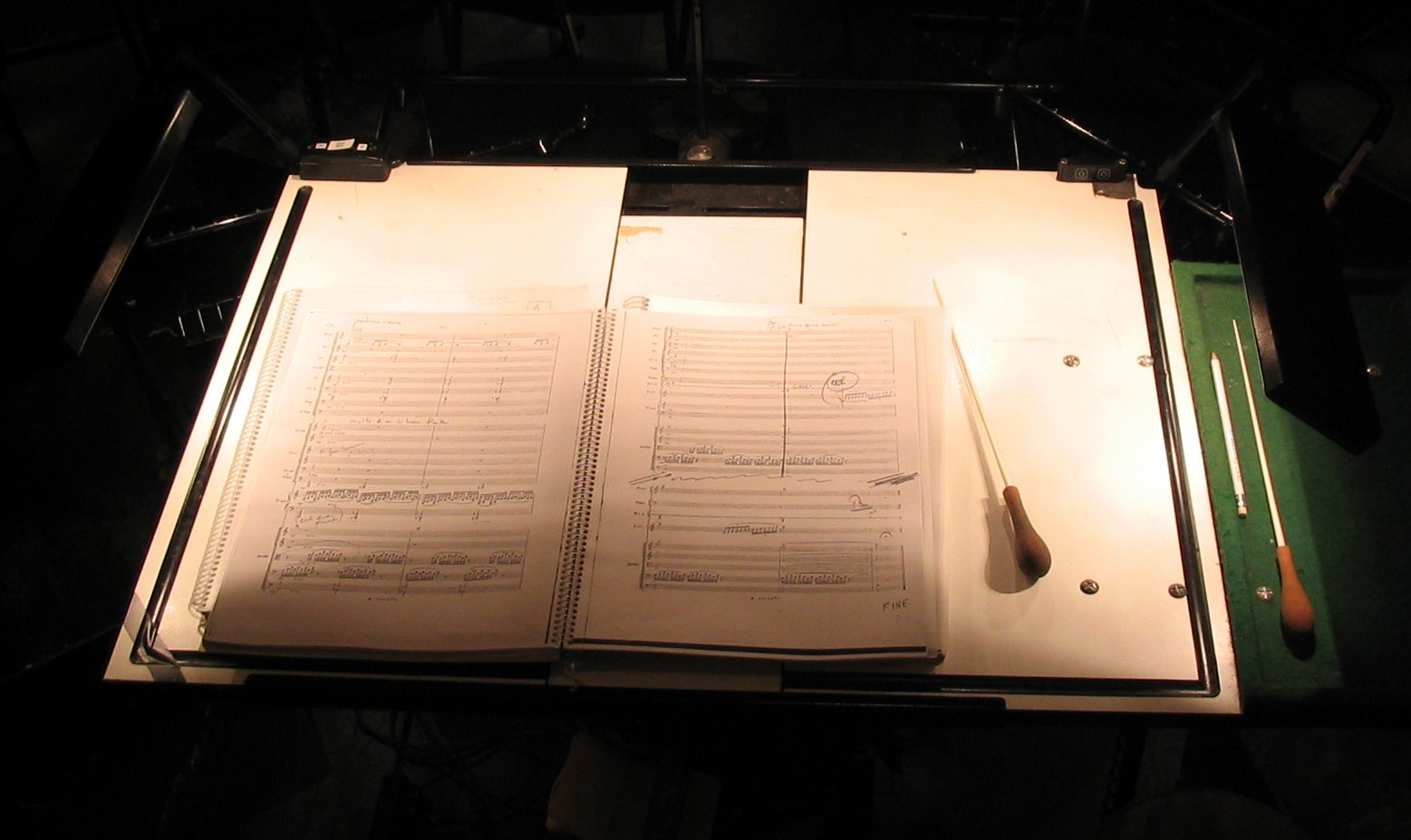
A conductor's score and batons

== Education ==
Most students attend a four-year university to earn a bachelor's degree in music. Degrees earned after a bachelor's are a master's degree in music and a doctoral degree in music. The ones that earn a Doctor of Music usually seek a professorship at an institution of higher learning.

== Conducting techniques ==
Conducting is a means of communicating real-time information to performers. There are no absolute rules on how to conduct correctly, and a wide variety of different conducting styles exist. The primary responsibilities of the conductor are to set the tempo, execute clear preparations and beats, and to listen and shape the sound of the ensemble.

An understanding of the basic elements of musical expression (tempo, dynamics, articulation) and the ability to communicate them effectively to an ensemble is necessary in order to conduct. The ability to communicate nuances of phrasing and expression through gesture is also beneficial. Conducting gestures may be choreographed beforehand by the conductor while studying the score, or may be spontaneous.

A distinction is sometimes made between orchestral conducting and choral conducting. Stereotypically, orchestral conductors use a baton more often than choral conductors (though not always: this is up to the conductor's personal preference), and favor the use of beat patterns over gestural conducting, which concentrates more on musical expression and shape.

The grip of the baton is a contentious issue that varies from conductor to conductor. Despite a wide variety of styles, a number of standard conventions have developed.

== See also ==
- Conductor (music)
