= Barry L. Houser =

Director of the University of Illinois Marching Illini

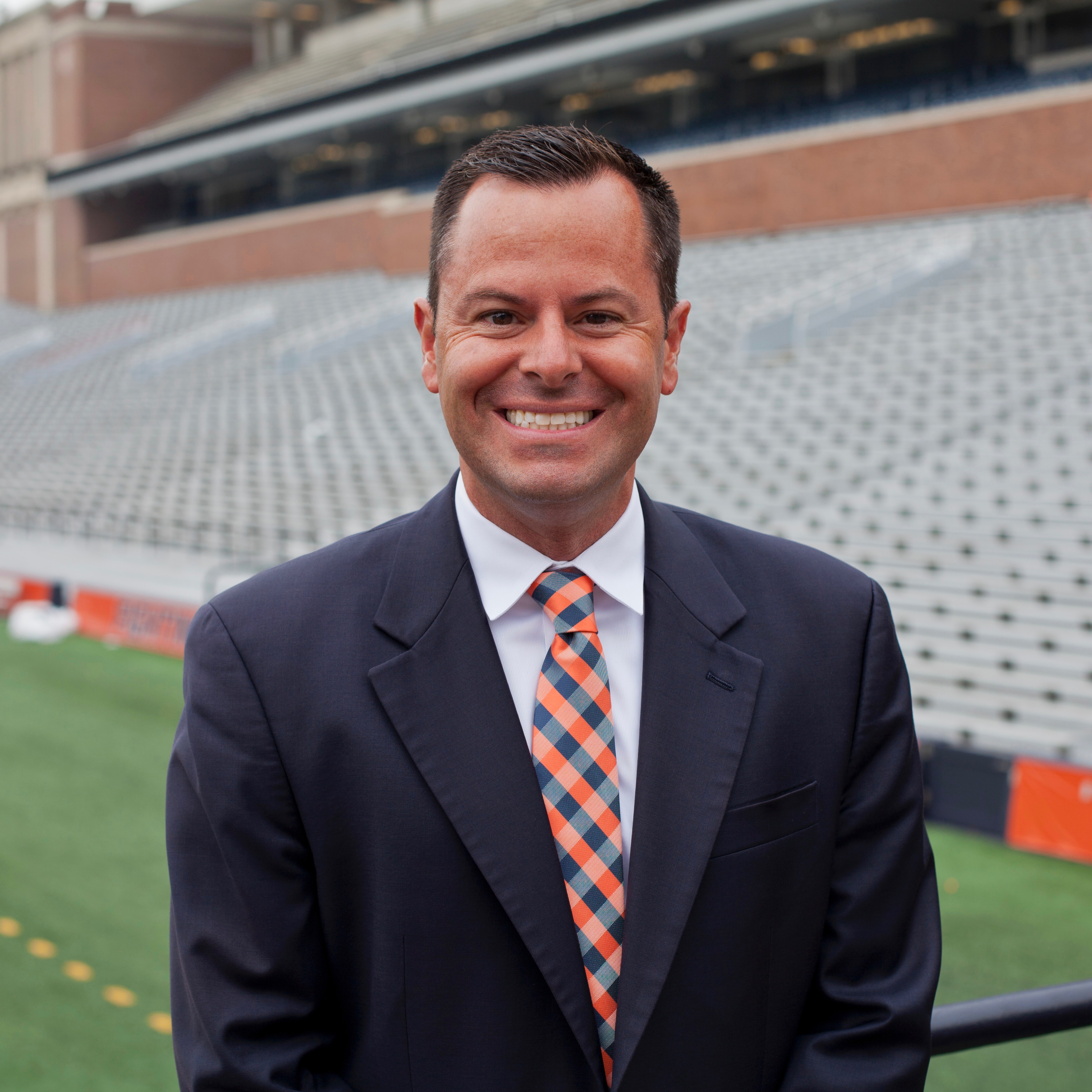
- Houser in Memorial Stadium in August 2015
- Born: Barry Lee Houser; June 21, 1977 (age 49); South Bend, Indiana, U.S.
- Education: B.M.E University of Florida; M.M. University of Illinois at Urbana-Champaign
- Title: Director of Athletic Bands
- Predecessor: Pete Griffin
- Spouse: Abigail Houser (m. June 22, 2007)

Barry Lee Houser (born June 21, 1977) is an American musician and conductor. He is the current director of the University of Illinois Marching Illini and Associate Director of Bands and Director of Athletic Bands at the University of Illinois at Urbana-Champaign. Houser also conducts the Illinois Wind Orchestra, the basketball and volleyball bands, and teaches in the School of Music.

Houser is the Director and Head Clinician for the Smith Walbridge Clinics.

== Education and personal life ==
Houser grew up in North Liberty, Indiana, and attended John Glenn High School in Walkerton, Indiana. Houser attended the University of Florida, majoring in music education, and performed as a trumpet player and eventually drum major of the Gator Marching Band.

After teaching in public high schools, in 2007, Houser attended the University of Illinois for a master's degree in wind band conducting, where he studied under James Keene and Pete Griffin. While a student at Illinois, Houser worked as a graduate assistant, where he conducted athletic bands and assisted with directing the Marching Illini, the band he would later lead.

On June 22, 2007, Houser married Abigail Dobies.

== Career ==
=== Eastern Illinois University (2008–2011) ===
Houser's first band-directing job was at Eastern Illinois University in Charleston, Illinois, as the Associate Director of Bands and Director of Athletic Bands. The Eastern Illinois University Marching Panthers was the first college marching band Houser directed.

=== University of Illinois Marching Illini (2011–present) ===
After the resignation of director Pete Griffin, the University of Illinois hired Houser as the new director of the University of Illinois Marching Illini, a marching band.

The band has performed at Chicago Bears home football games, an It's On Us rally held by Vice President Joe Biden, the Dublin St. Patrick's Day Parade, and the 2015 Macy's Thanksgiving Day Parade. The band performed at the end of the parade.

During Houser's time at the university, the band has held a fundraiser called the "Sousaphone 5K." After the first year the race was held, Houser agreed to run the 5K the following year while wearing a sousaphone if the band raised $5,000. Another band fundraiser included the piccolo section's participation in a dance marathon.

=== 2015 Ohio State recruitment ===
In April 2015, the News-Gazette reported that Ohio State University was recruiting Houser to serve as the director of their marching band. After interviewing and being named a finalist, Houser withdrew his candidacy.

=== Other work ===
Houser is also the President of the Smith Walbridge Drum Major Clinics. Houser first joined the staff in 1995. Houser has been selected to conduct the Macy's Great American Marching Band six times.
