= J. W. Pepper =

J. W. Pepper might refer to:

- J.W. Pepper & Son, Inc., American company
- Sheriff J.W. Pepper, fictional character in two James Bond films
