= Illini Drumline =

The Illini Drumline is a sub-section of the Marching Illini at the University of Illinois Urbana-Champaign. Composed of 37 players, the Illini Drumline performs at a multitude of events throughout the year. Most notably at Illini Football games, as well as Illini Basketball games in the spring. As a collegiate drumline, they aim to play and provide entertainment at a high level for fans all throughout the year.

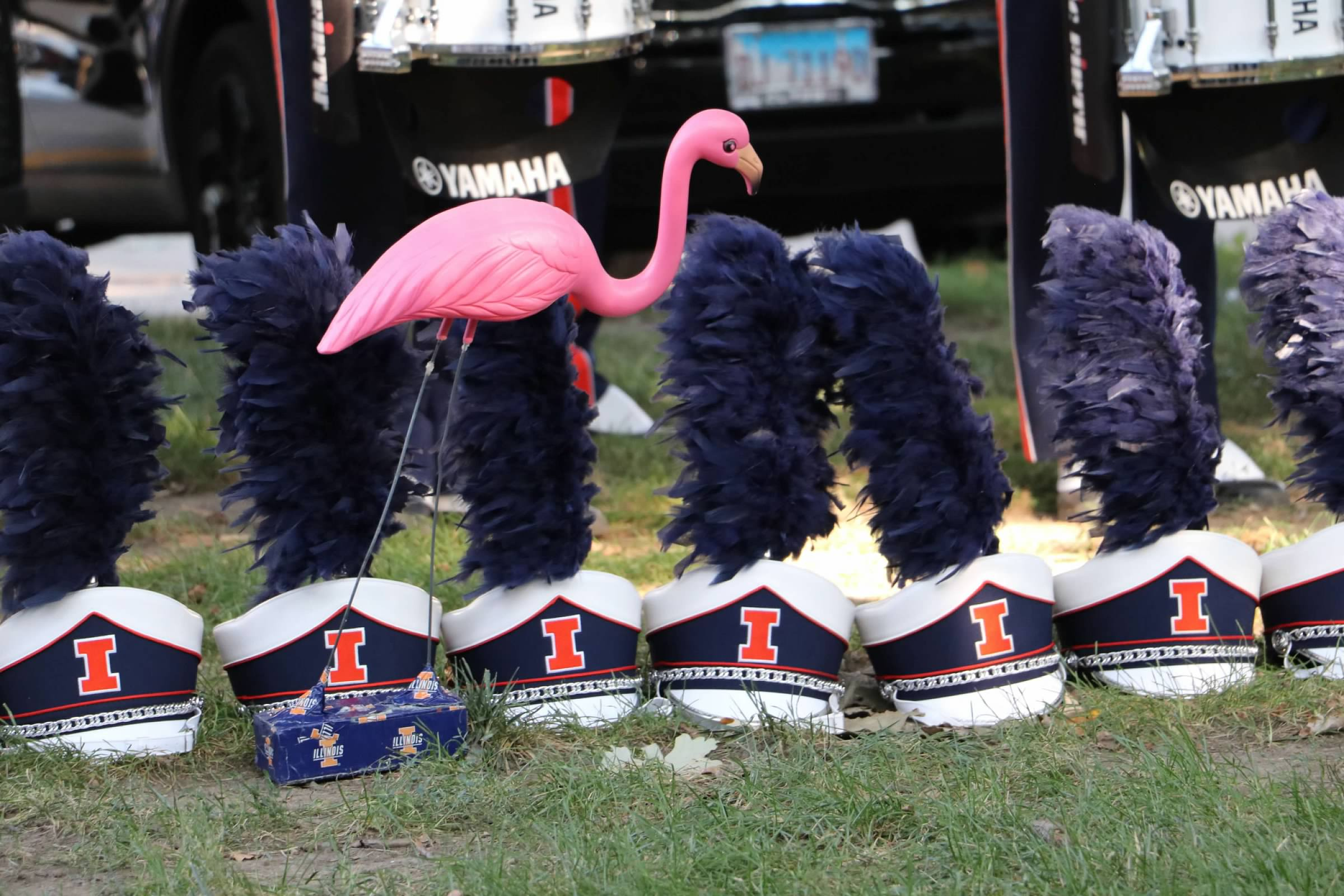
The Party Chicken at a public warmup.

== The Party Chicken ==
The Illini Drumline deemed a mascot in the fall of 1984. The "Party Chicken", a standard pink yard flamingo, has been the organization's mascot for 40 years. The Party Chicken has since then been incorporated into most of the Illini Drumline merchandise, as well as all social media presence. The Party Chicken can be seen traveling with the drumline, front and center at all performances.

== Instrumentation ==
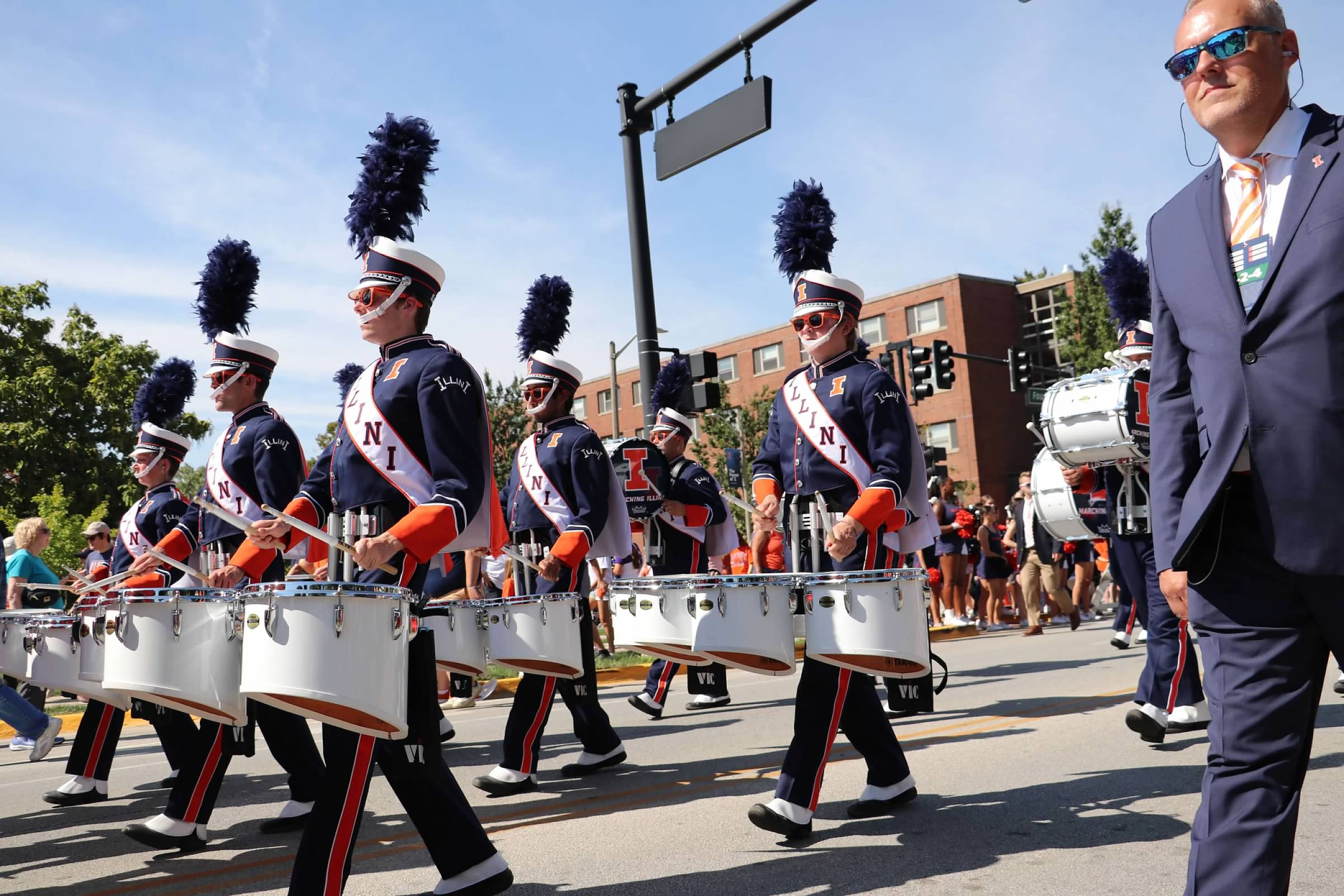
Members of the Illini Drumline Tenor section marching in a gameday parade.

The Illini Drumline is made up of 37 members, along with a Director and Drumline Undergraduate Staff. The instrumentation is:

- 12 Snares
- 6 Tenors (Quads)
- 7 Basses
- 12 Cymbals

Each sub-section is led by a student section leader, who dedicates time to teaching their section, as well as writing music performed by the drumline. Instrumentation numbers have been known to change under special circumstances, but generally stay at 37 members.

The Illini Drumline is always led by a head Drumline Director. The director is responsible for organizing auditions, setting a drumline roster, writing halftime-show music, and overall guiding the drumline to success

The Illini Drumline recently introduced the roll of a Drumline Undergraduate Staff member. This member, technically a section of the Undergraduate staff in the Marching Illini, helps set up equipment for drumline practices and performances, may fill in for a missing member, and helps the processes of the drumline run smoothly. This member is often chosen based on their expertise in marching percussion.

== Performances ==
=== Friday Night HYPE ===
The Illini Drumline has their own music showcase the night before every gameday. Starting at 10PM, the Illini Drumline parades down Green Street, a popular University of Illinois campus street, and ends up at the Alma Mater. The drumline proceeds to get the crowd of students and fans "hype" for the game the following day.

=== Public warm-up ===
The Marching Illini can spend upwards of two hours practicing the mornings of every game day. The Illini Drumline will continue to perform for the public after these rehearsals. The "Public Warm-up" aims to allow the drumline to warm up and get in the right mindset for the day, as well as a time for the public to see the drumline's full cadence series.

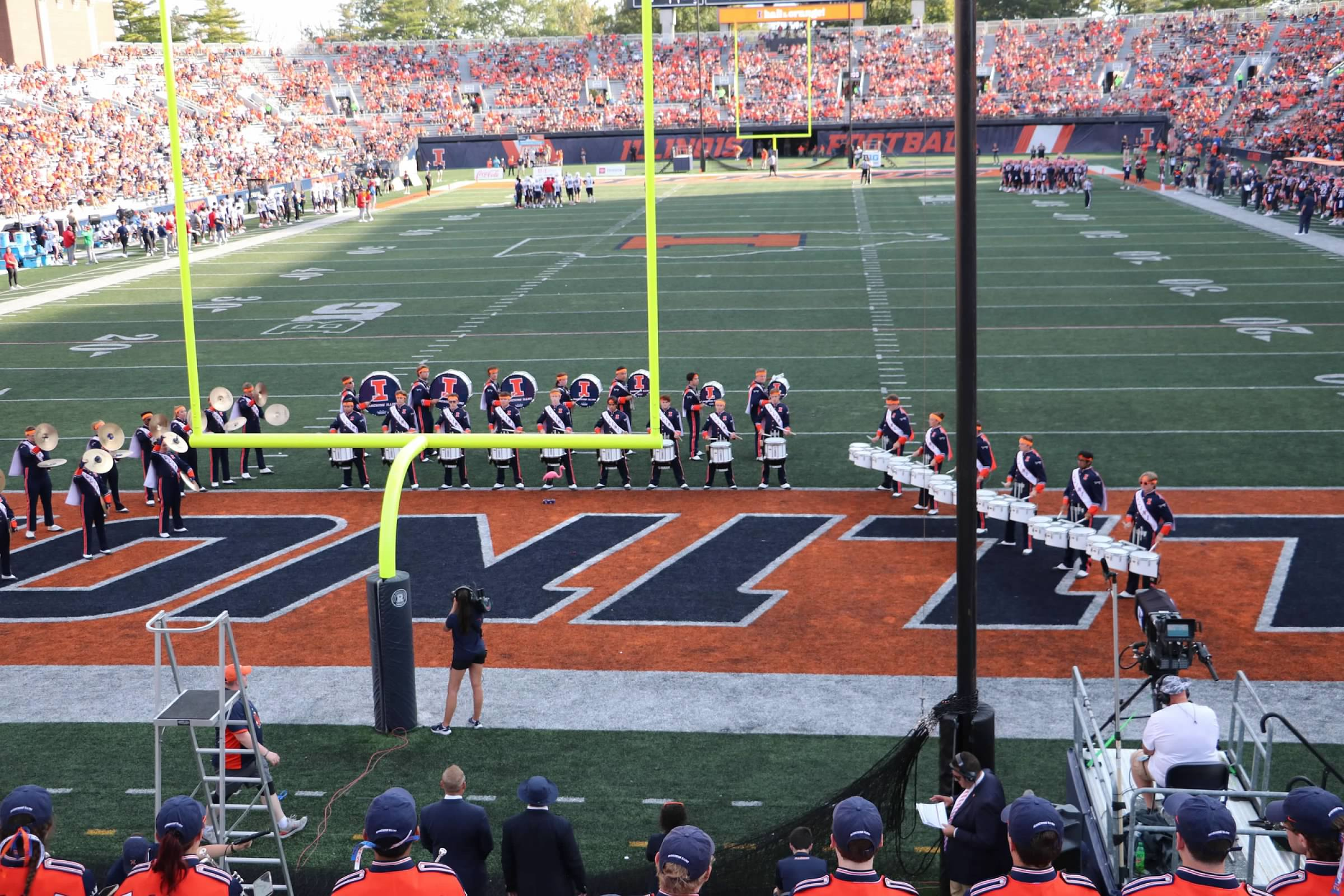
The Illini Drumline performing on Zuppke Field in Memorial Stadium during a 3rd quarter break at a football game.

=== Third quarter performance ===
The Illini Drumline often plays for the gameday crowd during a Third Quarter TV Timeout. Facing the student section, the performances often last 90 seconds, and aims to create excitement approaching the end of the game.

=== Illinois Marching Band Championships ===
Around Mid-Fall, the University of Illinois hosts 42 high school bands who are amongst the highest performing in the state. "IMBC" features two marching performances by the Marching Illini. The Illini Drumline teams up with the Sousaphone section in the Marching Illini, and plays their cadence series as the sousaphones perform a rehearsed visual sequence. The Illini Drumline also utilizes the crowd and performs in various locations around Memorial Stadium throughout the day. The drumline holds public sub-sectionals, giving spectators the opportunity to watch the respective section leaders lead a rehearsal for their sub-section. The final feature performance by the Marching Illini is immediately followed up by a showcase of the Illini Drumline outside of Memorial Stadium. These performance are meant to expose highschool students to collegiate level drumline music, and motivate graduating seniors to audition for the drumline in the spring.

=== Basketball games ===
The Illini Drumline will often play at a multitude of home basketball games throughout the spring semester. They are featured during TV timeouts and occasional halftime performances. Music selection is circulated, and they occasionally prepare specific choreography and drill respective to the song.

== Auditions ==
=== Section leaders ===
Section Leader auditions typically take place during the end of the regular marching season in the fall. There are four section leaders, one for each instrument on the drumline. Results are often announced in the beginning of the spring semester, which allows the section leaders enough time to prepare for teaching and write the required music for the upcoming marching season. Section Leaders must have at least one year of Marching Illini experience, but are often veteran members who have adequate marching and playing experience.

=== Clinics ===
The Illini Drumline hosts five clinics meant to help auditionees with the audition process. The clinics are not mandatory for the audition, but highly recommended. There are different types of clinics throughout the spring that gradually work on more complicated fundamentals and techniques.

==== Main clinics ====
There are three main clinics throughout the spring. They are monthly, falling on Saturdays in January, February, and March. These clinics are led by the Drumline Director, and focus on instrument technique, rudiments, and audition expectations.

==== Sub-section clinics ====
There are two subsection clinics throughout the spring. They fall in between Saturdays of the main clinics in February and March. These clinics are led by the appointed section leaders for the upcoming season. Auditionees split up based on instrument and are led through a typical sub-section rehearsal. These clinics give auditionees the opportunity to get more attention and specialized advice for their specific instrument.

=== First round auditions ===
First round auditions are historically due on April 1 every spring. Due to the large amount of auditionees, the audition is a video submission composed of many elements. Auditionees are often required to play part, if not all, of the cadence series, along with additional warmup fundamentals that the Illini Drumline will utilize during the marching season.

=== Second round auditions ===
Following the results of the first round, second round auditions are held in person at the University of Illinois. They take place in the last weekend of April for a full day of playing and marching. Judges help instruct a rehearsal in sub-sections to help simulate a typical rehearsal environment. A required memorized piece is often played individually in front of a panel of judges, which is followed by a full rehearsal including all auditionees. The second half of the day consists of a marching portion, where the auditionees will practice playing Illini Drumline music while marching, and then are judged on physicality and fundamentals on a practice field.

== History ==
=== Influence ===
The Illini Drumline follows a long line of tradition, having lots of inspiration from the Cavaliers Drum Corps. Much of the Illini Drumline music consists of drum corps style beats, often credited to the lineage of Drum Corps members and alumni who were a part of the organization.

=== Alumni ===
Notable alumni of the group include the following:

- William F. Ludwig II (IDL 1937): Owner of the Ludwig Drum Company
- Michael Colgrass (IDL 1950-51): 1978 Pulitzer Prize for Music for his symphonic piece Déjà vu, which was commissioned and premiered by the New York Philharmonic. 1982 Emmy Award for a PBS documentary Soundings: The Music of Michael Colgrass.
- Al Payson (IDL 1950-1951): Chicago Symphony Orchestra 1958 to 1997. Grammy award-winning recording of Ravel's "Bolero" under the baton of Sir Georg Solti, featuring Payson on snare drum.
- Bill Olson (IDL 1954-58): Dean of Fine and Applied Arts, University of Illinois
- Russ Weber (IDL 1976-79): Father of the modern Illini Drumline. Responsible for changing the technique and culture of the drumline into a high-precision, drum corps style line with a better look, better playing, challenging parts, and great social events.
- Paul Rudolph (IDL 2004-08): Emmy Awards in 2016, 2017, and 2018 for Outstanding Sound Editing as music editor for Sesame Street.
- Lt. Graham Stapleton (IDL 2008-11): U.S.Navy F18 Fighter pilot.
