= Sousa Archives and Center for American Music =

University museum in Illinois, U.S.

- Established: September 26, 2002
- Location: 236 Harding Band Building; 1103 South Sixth Street; Champaign, Illinois 61820; United States
- Coordinates: 40.10477°N 88.23072°W
- Type: University museum
- Director: Scott Schwartz
- Public transit access: C-U MTD
- Website: http://www.library.illinois.edu/sousa/

The Sousa Archives and Center for American Music (SACAM) documents American music through historical artifacts and archival records in multiple formats. The center is part of the University of Illinois at Urbana–Champaign's library system and the University of Illinois School of Music.

Among the center's important collections are archives of John Philip Sousa, Albert Austin Harding (Illinois' first band-master), Herbert L. Clarke and the University of Illinois Bands. The center is devoted to collection and preservation, public access, exhibitions, publications, and scholarship.

The center is located in the Harding Band Building on the campus of the University of Illinois. It operates as a museum, with annual rotating exhibits on themes such as Baseball and Music, Women and Music, Technology and Music, and events during the annual November Music Month in Champaign-Urbana. All collections are accessible to the public and are regularly used in exhibit displays and public programming.

== Collections ==
The center opened in 1994 with the transfer from the University Bands of the Sousa and Clarke personal papers, and related materials. (The Bands had previously acquired Sousa's papers from a personal connection between Sousa and Harding, the University of Illinois' first band-master.) Since then, additional collections have been added. These include over 50 record series documenting the history of American music, and music and performing arts at the University of Illinois. In addition to the Sousa, Clarke and Harding material, there are papers and music by and about Harry Partch, Harry Begian, Salvatore Martirano, Pietro A. Cipollone, Elbern Alkire, Paul Martin Zonn, Kenneth Gaburo, Paul Bierley and Virginia Root. There are instrument collections from Alkire and Carl Busch, and the Jack Linker Sound Recording Collection. The archives of the Association of Concert Bands is also held by the center, including administrative files, convention and concert programs, photographs, and sound recordings. The center also houses the Sal-Mar Construction, an electronic music system created by Salvatore Martirano, which enabled him to write and perform music that mixed human and computer-generated sounds and composition.

The Sousa collection also includes the Claude Gordon Personal Papers and Music Instrument Collection, 1888–1992, which consists of music and correspondence with Herbert L. Clarke and other notable trumpet artists, educational material, publicity and memorabilia, and performance contracts. Claude Gordon, a long-time student of Herbert L. Clarke, was an internationally renowned trumpet soloist, band leader and teacher with many methods published worldwide in several languages.

== See also ==
- List of music museums
- Champaign County Museums Network
