= Macy's Great American Marching Band =

Macy’s Great American Marching Band
- Nickname: All-American Marching Band
- Founded: 2006
- Director: Dr. Richard Good
- Members: 225-250
- Website: https://www.musfestivals.com/programs/great-american-marching-band/

The Macy's Great American Marching Band (also known as the All-American Marching Band) is a national marching band consisting of 225 to 250 high school marching band musicians that annually marches in the Macy’s Thanksgiving Day Parade.

== History ==
The Macy's Great American Marching Band was created in 2006 in honor of the 80th Anniversary of the Macy’s Thanksgiving Day Parade. The band was sponsored by Yamaha, with their Director of Marketing Roger Eaton calling it an "exciting event". The 2006 ensemble was led by Dr. Rick Good, Director of Bands at Auburn University, and Dr. Jon Woods, Director of Bands at Ohio State University.

The Band has performed in ever parade since 2006, with the exception of the 2020 parade, where they did not march in it due to the COVID-19 Pandemic.

== Notable members ==
- Barry L. Houser (conductor)
