= Marching Illini =

Marching band of the University of Illinois Urbana-Champaign

- School: University of Illinois
- Location: Urbana-Champaign, IL
- Conference: Big Ten
- Founded: 1867
- Director: Barry L. Houser
- Members: 400
- Fight song: "Illinois Loyalty (school) and Oskee Wow Wow (fight)"

Uniform
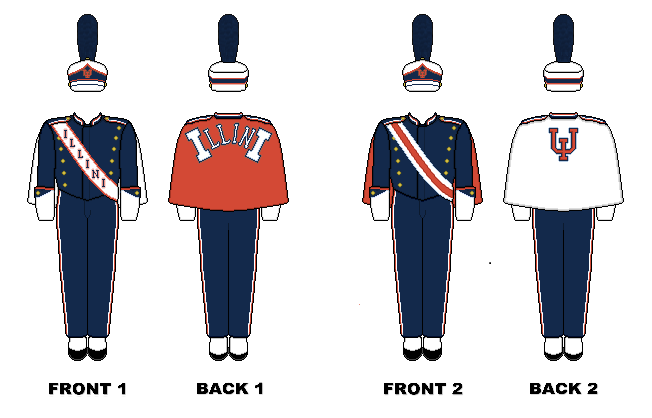
- Website: marchingillini.com

The Marching Illini is the marching band of the University of Illinois Urbana-Champaign. The Marching Illini is an organization which annually includes approximately 400 students enrolled in the University of Illinois, and Parkland College. It was founded in 1868 and primarily performs at Illini football games as well as other events around campus.

The band is a part of the College of Fine and Applied Arts and Illini Athletics, and has diverse member participation from most colleges, disciplines and majors on the university's campus.

== History ==
=== Early history ===
The first marching band unit of record at the University of Illinois Urbana-Champaign was during the first year of classes in the fall of 1867. This was a group that consisted of a tenor drum, bass drum and fife. In January 1869, these three members were joined by several brass players who brought instruments from home.

In 1870, the university purchased a set of brass instruments and that same year sixteen band members petitioned the administration for a teacher. I.W. Colberg, a music teacher in Urbana, was hired to provide music lessons and marching drills for two years until the spring of 1873. As part of the Military Department, the band provided music for battalion drills, chapel exercises and ceremonies. The band was housed in University Hall until 1928.

New navy blue uniforms were purchased for the Military Band in 1894 with funds raised by the band and contributions from alumni. Until that time the band had worn the same gray uniforms as the military battalion with the addition of a few embellishments.

Albert Austin Harding became the first Director of Bands in 1907 & continued in this position until his retirement in 1948. Mark Hindsley arrived in Illinois in 1934 as assistant to Harding. He was recruited to enlist as a music officer in the Army Air Corps in 1942. While Hindsley (and many of the male students) were gone, the band began to admit women into the concert band program. In 1950, Hindsley was officially promoted to Director of Bands. Hindsley is also credited with coining the name “Marching Illini.” Prior to this, the band was simply called "Football Band."

=== Present day ===
In fall 2020, the band did not play live performances for football in Memorial Stadium because of COVID-19 virus restrictions, and struggled to hold rehearsals online due to latency issues over Zoom. In Memorial Stadium, a surrogate band of 300 photographic cardboard cutouts of all the band members was set up in the band section. Music videos recorded by the band were played on the stadium scoreboard screen.

The band did perform outdoors during the pandemic with safety protocols in place, including masks, bell covers, staying 6 feet apart, and limited rehearsal times.

== Performances ==
The band primarily performs before, during, and after University of Illinois home football games. The band also performs an indoor concert at the Assembly Hall featuring special lighting effects, performances by individual sections, and slightly pithy comic routines. Other performances include a drill for the Illini Marching Festival, halftime performance for the Chicago Bears at Soldier Field, halftime performances at postseason bowl games, and an annual away performance at the home football game of another Big Ten school. The Marching Illini do not typically perform for parades other than marching to and from the stadium for home games, the annual Homecoming parade, and when marching to and from Foellinger Auditorium where they play several outdoor concerts for University events. In addition the Marching Illini have performed at the 1992, 1995, 1998, 2008, 2014, 2018, 2022, and 2026 St. Patrick’s Day Parade in Dublin, Ireland and the 2015 Macy's Thanksgiving Day Parade in New York City. The Sousa Archives and Center for American Music at the University of Illinois houses a collection of University Band recordings. The audio recordings consists of reel-to-reel tapes of performances and recording sessions from 1940 to 1987.

On Saturday August 28, 2021, the band debuted a hip hop remixed version of their traditional blues riffed "Low Brass" entitled "Illini Anthem" performed by Rap Artist Jarrel Young and produced by University of Illinois School of Music Professor Lamont Holden, also known as TheLetterLBeats which broke ground as the first rap song to officially represent a Big Ten, FBS and/or state collegiate institution as a fight song.

== Instrumentation ==
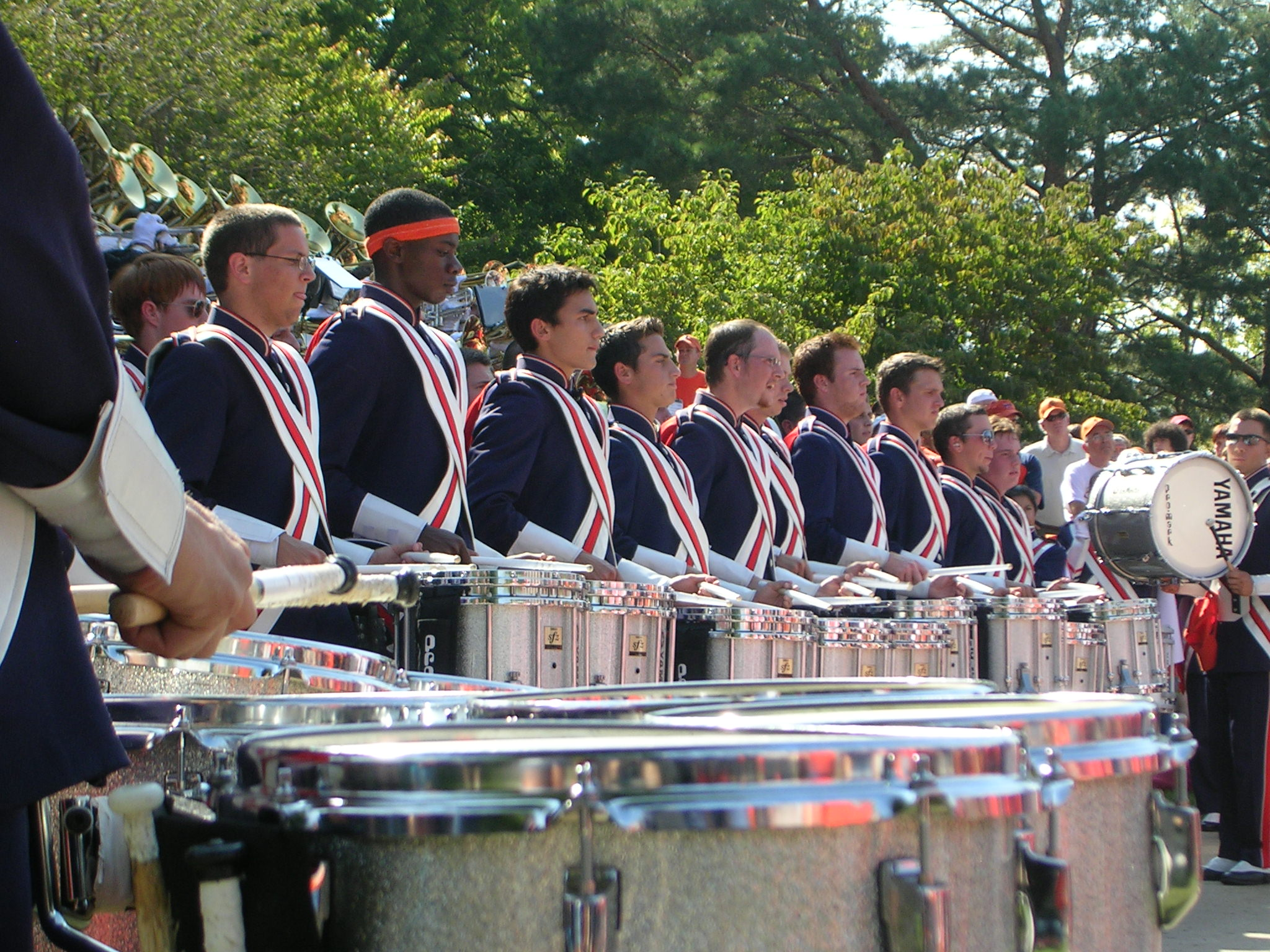
The Marching Illini Drumline at the postgame Concert

The Marching Illini's instrumentation is similar to that of a typical concert band, allowing them to play extensive selections of repertoire. The band's instrumentation is as follows:

- 24 piccolos
- 24 clarinets
- 24 alto saxophones
- 18 tenor saxophones
- 70 trumpets
- 24 mellophones
- 40 trombones
- 20 baritones
- 24 sousaphones
- 36 drumline

In addition to this, the Marching Illini also employ:

- 1 feature twirler
- 2-4 drum majors
- 18 Big Ten Conference flags
- 8 undergraduate staff

During their pregame performance, the band uses a reduced instrumentation.

== Organization ==
=== Director ===
Professor Barry L. Houser was named as Visiting Assistant Director of Bands and Conductor of Athletics Bands (including Director of the Marching Illini and Basketball Band) in July 2011. Professor Houser served as Director of the Marching Panthers and Basketball Band at Eastern Illinois University while also serving as Acting Director of Bands at EIU from 2008 to 2011 after receiving a graduate degree from the University of Illinois. As a graduate student, Houser instructed with the Marching Illini as a Graduate Assistant, frequently conducting from the backfield podium during performances. Houser attended the University of Florida as an undergraduate and has been involved with the nationally renowned Smith-Walbridge Clinics for drum majors and marching bands with Director Emeritus of the Marching Illini Gary E. Smith. Houser now serves as Director and Head Clinician with Smith-Walbridge.

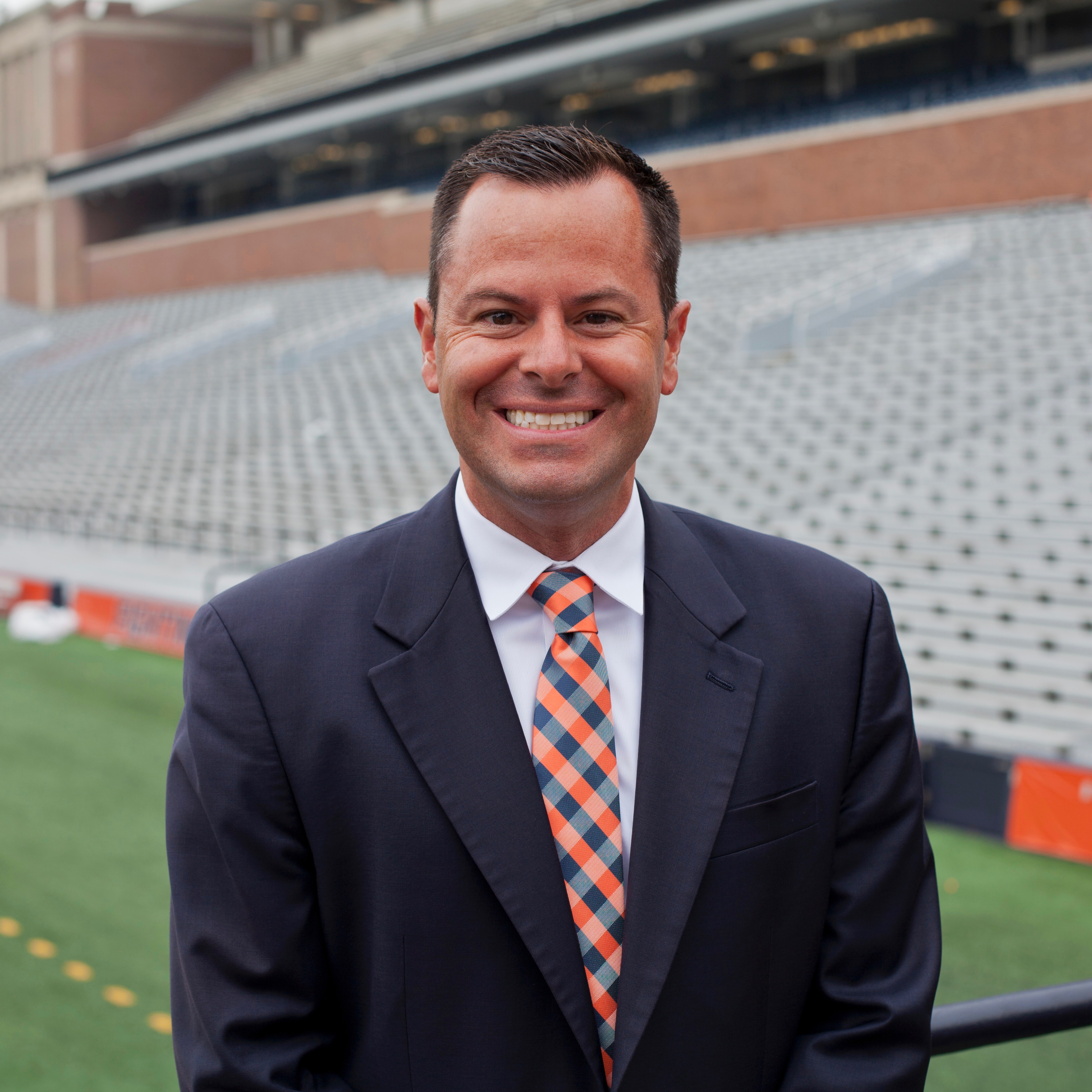
Professor Barry L. Houser, director of the Marching Illini

Houser's immediate predecessor was Dr. Peter J. Griffin. He became the Assistant Director of Bands in 1994. During his tenure at Illinois, he served as Coordinator of Band Festivals and Assistant Director of the Marching Illini. Upon the resignation of Director Tom Caneva in 2006, Griffin was chosen as an interim replacement. Griffin was named as the permanent director in December 2006 and served in that position until May 2011, when he took the position of Chair of the Music Department at Elmhurst College.

Director	Tenure
Barry L. Houser	2011–present
Dr. Peter J. Griffin	2006-2010
Dr. Thomas E. Caneva	1998-2005
Gary E. Smith	1976-1997, sabbatical replacement 2004
Everett Kisinger	1949-1975
Clarence Sawhill	1942−1945
Mark Hindsley	1934-1941, 1946−1948, military leave 1942−1945
Raymond Francis Dvorak	1926-1933
Albert Austin Harding	1907-1925

== Auditions ==
All members of the Marching Illini band are selected by a music and marching audition. High school seniors planning to attend UI, transfer students, Parkland (community) College students, and current UI students are allowed to audition for the Marching Illini. Students must be accepted into the university before setting up an audition time. Since audition results are announced in early May, students must complete their audition by April 28. Auditions continue through the summer for open positions only. If a student desires to audition on multiple instruments (for instance, alto and tenor saxophone) they may sign up for multiple time slots.

Some positions, such as Illinettes, Illini Drumline, Marching Illini Colorguard, and Drum Major have earlier, more in-depth auditions. These positions generally have a series of camps and different audition levels starting as early as January and running throughout the Spring semester.

== Traditions ==
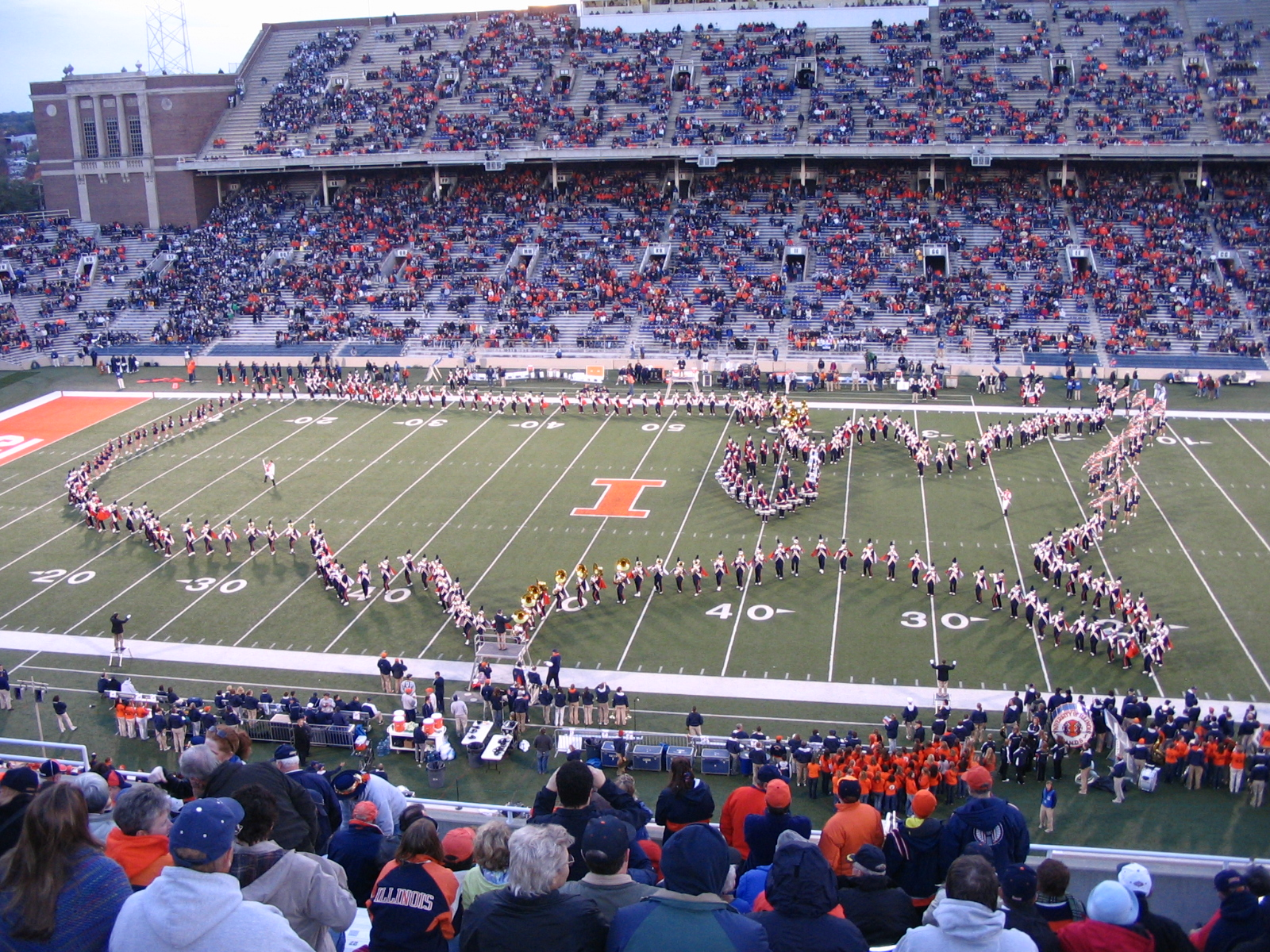
The Marching Illini in USA Formation during Patriotic Medley from the traditional pregame show

=== Three-In-One ===
The Three-In-One is a tradition forged in the early years of the band’s history from three distinct pieces of the University’s heritage. The Marching “ILLINI” formation was created by A.A. Harding and his assistants in the early 1920s, making it the oldest part of the Three-In-One. The marching drill for this formation originally consisted of a march down the field in a “Block I” formation, and a marching into the ILLINI formation once the band had marched back downfield. The present-day version of the Marching ILLINI is similar to the original, but is highlighted by an intricate countermarch that allows the band to form the ILLINI letter by letter as it marches back down the field.

The musical portion of the Three-In-One consists of three distinct Illinois pieces: “Pride of the Illini,” “March of the Illini,” and “Hail to the Orange.” “Pride of the Illini,” written by Karl King with words by Ray Dvorak expressly for the Illinois Bands, was published in 1928. Harry Alford’s “March of the Illini” was also published in 1928, but was used during Chief Illinwek’s performance from the beginning in 1926. ″Hail to the Orange″ was written by Harold V. Hill with words by Howard R. Green in 1910. The three pieces were eventually combined into a medley and given the title, “Three-In-One.” The “Three-In-One” drill and music are an important part of the University’s heritage.

Chief Illiniwek was retired by the University of Illinois in 2007. The Chief last danced to the Three in One on February 21, 2007 at a men's basketball game. However, the Marching Illini continues to perform the Three in One at halftime of football games.

Recently, there have been calls to remove the music of the Three in One completely from performances. Stephen Kaufman, a professor at the University of Illinois and a longtime opponent of Chief Illiniwek, brought the issue up at a faculty meeting in October 2015. He asked Interim Chancellor Barbara Wilson to take action and stop the Marching Illini from performing the Three in One at future events because of its link to Chief Illiniwek. Kaufman also threatened to approach the NCAA about the situation if no further action was taken. Wilson refused to take action on the matter.

=== Illinois Loyalty ===
Illinois Loyalty is the Illinois school song and was written by Thacher Howland Guild specifically for the university. It was first performed by the University Military Band in concert on March 3, 1906. As the only band at the university in 1906 the Military Band functioned as a marching, ceremonial and concert band.

=== Oskee Wow-Wow ===
Oskee Wow-Wow was written in 1910 by two students, Harold V. Hill (music) and Howard R. Green (words), and was copyrighted in 1911. It was intended as an entry for a skit contest. Oskee Wow-Wow is an invented phrase similar to other college cheers and yells of that period. The song is used as the Illinois fight song since Illinois Loyalty is not well-suited for rousing a crowd during a game. The university is somewhat unusual in this regard, as it is uncommon for a school to have a separate fight song and school song.

=== Hail to the Orange ===
The Illinois Alma Mater, Hail to the Orange, also written in 1910 by Hill and Green is performed as part of Three in One at the end of each halftime performance. It is sung a cappella in 4-part harmony by the Marching Illini before the band is dismissed at the end of the post-game concert following each home game.

== Travel ==
The Marching Illini has performed at many different venues, such as the Citrus Bowl, ReliaQuest Bowl, and the Music City Bowl for NCAA Football postseason games. The band also travels around the country performing at various exhibitions and ceremonies as needed.

Additionally, the Marching Illini returned to Dublin, Ireland in March, 2026 as part of their tradition of playing in Ireland for the Dublin St. Patrick's Day parade every four years since 1992. The band will also travel to New York City to perform in the 100th Anniversary of the Macy's Thanksgiving Day Parade in November 2026.

== Achievements ==
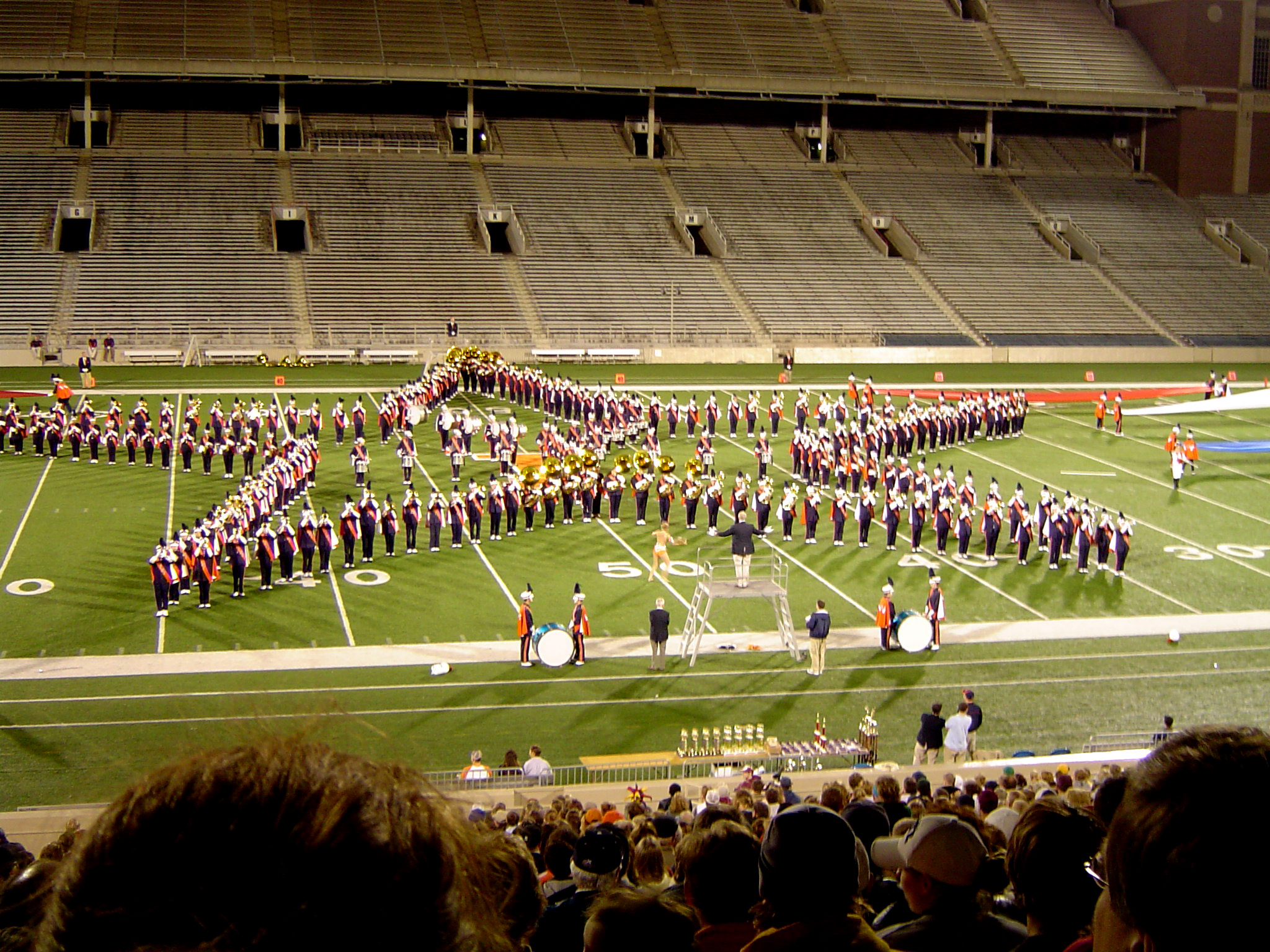
The Marching Illini at the 2004 Marching Festival

The Marching Illini was the second band to ever be awarded the prestigious Louis Sudler Intercollegiate Marching Band Trophy in 1983, after only the Michigan Marching Band.

In addition to its performances, the University of Illinois Bands could claim the honor of holding the largest collection of original works and papers by John Philip Sousa, until 1994 when these items were transferred from the possession of the band to the university's archives, under the control of the University Library. These archives remain housed on the upper level of the Harding Band Building.

The Marching Illini can also lay claim to several firsts, which are listed on the band's official website. These include:

- Birthplace of the college concert band - first formal concert given on 3 May 1892, with performances as early as 6 June 1872 when the band played for the first University Commencement. Playing for Commencement ceremonies is the longest running tradition in University Bands.
- First school song - Illinois Loyalty was first performed March 3, 1906
- First college to use Sousaphones - upright bell model sousaphones were purchased in 1906–1907
- First halftime show - in 1907 for the University of Chicago game
- First to form school letters (Block I in parade)
- First Homecoming - first celebrated on 15 October 1910
- First Dad's Day - first celebrated in November, 1920
- First Mom's Day - first celebrated in 1921
- Performed at first football game broadcast on radio (band was heard on WGN experimental play-by-play broadcast, probably in 1924)
- First to sing a cappella on the field - in the Quad Cities during a trip to Iowa in 1920
- Chief Illiniwek made his first appearance in 1926
- First student card section (Block I) formed in 1929
- Referred to by John Philip Sousa as "World's Greatest College Band" in the 1920s
- First band to have its own band building, the Harding Band Building, opened in 1957 on the site of the wooden frame building occupied by the bands from 3 April 1928 to 1956.
- First to have a giant school flag
- First to march mallets at the college level
- First college marching band to release a compact disc ("The Marching Illini" in 1986)
- First college band to march in the St. Patrick's Day Parade in Dublin, Ireland in 1992; first non-Irish band ever to lead the St. Patrick's Day Parade in Dublin, Ireland, in 2008 under the direction of Dr. Peter J. Griffin
- First Band with a website – first advertised in April, 1994.
- Performed at the first televised football game and the first football game televised in color.
- First band to use field bugles in a field show (1913–14), thus making the Marching Illini the first drum and bugle corps
- Debbie Soumar became the first female Drum Major of the Big Ten in 1977
- First rap song performed to officially represent a Big Ten, FBS and/or state collegiate institution as a fight song in 2021

In 2019, band members began using eFlip, a device that attaches to their instrument and holds a smartphone or a tablet that will display sheet music instead of the sheet music stands they've used in the past. This will save time and money—about $30,000 to $35,000 a year.
