= Champaign County Museums Network =

Champaign County Museums Network, formerly The Museums at the Crossroads Consortium, is a group of museums in Champaign County, Illinois, that collaborate to raise awareness about their respective institutions, on public programs, education, and outreach. Current members in the consortium include: Anita Purves Nature Center, Champaign County Historical Museum, Homer Lake Interpretive Center, Krannert Art Museum, Museum of the Grand Prairie, Orpheum Children's Science Museum, Pollinatarium, Sousa Archives and Center for American Music, Spurlock Museum, and Staerkel Planetarium. Projects of the consortium include producing educators' resource guides, brochures, banners and collaborations for special events.
