= Pollinatarium =

- Established: 2009; 17 years ago
- Location: Urbana, Illinois, US
- Coordinates: 40°05′14″N 88°12′52″W
- Type: Science museum
- Owner: School of Integrative Biology, University of Illinois Urbana-Champaign
- Employees: Deem, Lesley S (program manager)
- Nearest parking: On site (no charge)
- Website: https://pollinatarium.illinois.edu/

The Pollinatarium (University of Illinois Pollinatarium or UI Pollinatarium) is the first freestanding science center in the United States dedicated to increasing public awareness and appreciation of pollination as both a remarkable ecological partnership and a crucial ecosystem service. The building, originally established as the campus's first Bee Research Facility (or "bee lab" for short), was repurposed in 2009 to become the University of Illinois Pollinatarium, after a new Bee Research Facility was constructed. The initial project of Pollinatarium received significant financial support from Peter Fox and his family, who are acknowledged with a commemorative plaque within the Pollinatarium. The center was reconfigured to focus on public outreach and education related to pollinators.

Each year, the University of Illinois Pollinatarium hosts a variety of educational programs and events that attract a wide range of visitors, including preschoolers, undergraduates, Osher Lifelong Learners, community groups, beekeepers, agritourists, and casual visitors to the campus. Notable programs include visits from Orchard Downs preschoolers who plant flowers, Girls Explore Biology during National Pollinator Week, and educational events like the Summer Academies for 4-H students focused on beekeeping. The Pollinatarium also serves over 900 second-grade students from Champaign Unit 4 and engages local beekeepers through seasonal meetings with the Central Eastern Illinois Beekeepers Association (CEIBA). Through these efforts, the Pollinatarium raises awareness about the vital role of bees and pollination, contributing to the University of Illinois' certification as a Bee Campus. The center's outreach initiatives foster a deeper understanding of the importance of pollinators in maintaining biodiversity and supporting global food production.

It is also a member of the Champaign County Museums Network.

== Fundraising efforts for the pollinatarium ==
The Pollinatarium relies heavily on donations for support. To help fund its programs, May Berenbaum, editor of a cook book, Honey, I'm Homemade: Sweet Treats from the Beehive across the Centuries and around the World (published by UI Press), donated all proceeds from the book to the Pollinatarium. On November 14, 2010, the Pollinatarium partnered with the Illini Union Bookstore for a special event, where staff sold copies of the book and Berenbaum was on hand to sign them. In addition, the Entomology Graduate Student Association (EGSA) at UIUC hosted a honey recipe contest during the event to further engage attendees and celebrate the importance of honey and pollinators.

Another successful fundraising event was the Pollinatarium Bee-zaar, held on June 23, 2018, during National Pollinator Week. Hosted by the EGSA at UIUC, the event featured toys, games, books, and shirts for sale, along with fun activities like face painting, balloon animals, and prizes.
