= Spurlock Museum =

- Former name: Spurlock Museum of World Cultures
- Established: September 26, 2002
- Location: 600 S. Gregory Street; Urbana, IL 61801; United States
- Coordinates: 40.1073°N 88.2214°W
- Type: University museum
- Director: Elizabeth Sutton
- Public transit access: MTD
- Website: www.spurlock.illinois.edu

The William R. and Clarice V. Spurlock Museum, better known as the Spurlock Museum, is an ethnographic museum at the University of Illinois at Urbana-Champaign. The Spurlock Museum's permanent collection includes portions of collections from other museums and units on the Urbana-Champaign campus such as cultural artifacts from the Museum of Natural History and Department of Anthropology as well as historic clothing from the Bevier Collection of the College of Agricultural, Consumer and Environmental Sciences. The museum also holds objects donated by other institutions and private individuals. With approximately 51,000 objects in its artifact collection, the Spurlock Museum at the University of Illinois at Urbana-Champaign collects, preserves, documents, exhibits, and studies objects of cultural heritage. The museum's main galleries, highlighting the ancient Mediterranean, modern Africa, ancient Egypt, Mesopotamia, East Asia, Oceania, Europe, and the Americas, celebrate the diversity of cultures through time and across the globe.

== History ==
The foundations of the modern Spurlock Museum can be traced back to 1911, when the university established the Museum of Classical Archaeology and Art and the Museum of European Culture. These were joined in 1917 by the Oriental Museum, which merged with Classical Archaeology and Art in 1929. In 1954 the Museum of European Culture joined with the merged Classical and Oriental Museum to form a single museum, which was renamed the World Heritage Museum in 1971.

From its beginnings in 1911, the museum in its various forms had operated out of a space on the fourth floor of Lincoln Hall. In 1995 a donation by William and Clarice Spurlock made it possible for a new building to be constructed to house the museum and its growing collections. In June 2000, the World Heritage Museum was renamed the William R. and Clarice V. Spurlock Museum, and on September 26, 2002, the museum opened to the public.

The size and age of the museum's collections made moving them from Lincoln Hall to the new Spurlock building a formidable task. The first complete inventory of the museum's holdings since 1972 was conducted before any of the objects were packed. More than 150 fields of information were recorded on each item. To pack the more than 30,000 items took thirty-five undergraduate students two years. The packing job took approximately 10,000 cubic feet (280 m^{3}) of bagged Styrofoam peanuts, 1,822 boxes, and 148 crates. Many of the boxes and crates for the most fragile artifacts were custom-made. The actual move between buildings took ten days.

== Collection ==
The Spurlock Museum's artifact collection contains approximately 51,000 objects, covering six continents and one million years of human cultural history. A few of the significant collections include Parthenon frieze casts, Merovingian bronzes, Mesopotamian cuneiform tablets, and Amazonian bark cloth. Artifact preservation and public education are the main tasks of Spurlock Museum. Preservation is achieved by keeping the majority of artifacts in storage; following professional standards, the museum only displays four to five percent of its holdings at any one time. Stored artifacts may be made available for scholarly study or loans to other institutions, as well as serve as a core for temporary exhibitions. They may also be used through the information and images provided on the internet. Not all of the artifacts described here are on display in the museum.

=== The Fred A. Freund Collection of Chinese and Japanese Wood Carvings ===
A collection of over 200 Japanese and Chinese wood carvings and associated materials have been received as a gift of Mr. Fred A. Freund. Donated since 1999, the artifacts date from the Edo and Meiji periods in Japan and from the Qing dynasty in China. The subject material depicted includes an assortment of human, animal, utilitarian and abstract images.

=== The Crocker Land Expedition-Collection from the Arctic ===
The Crocker Land Expedition Collection consists of over 200 artifacts and hundreds of photos collected between 1913 and 1917 by an Arctic exploration team led by ethnologist Donald B. MacMillan. The photographs highlight the Inuit, landscapes, and wildlife while the ethnographic or cultural artifacts include hunting and whaling tools, clothing and sled equipment.

=== The Edgar J. Banks Collection of Sumerian and Babylonian Clay Tablets ===
This collection of approximately 1750 inscribed tablets from ancient sites of Umman and Drehem in Mesopotamia dates from the Third Dynasty of Ur in the 21st and 20th centuries BCE to the Neo-Babylonian and early Persian periods (ca. 625-520 BCE). This collection includes texts written in both the Sumerian and the Akkadian languages. The script called cuneiform, is the earliest writing system in the world.

== Feature galleries ==
The feature galleries make up the core structure of the Spurlock Museum. The galleries feature exhibits on the ancient Mediterranean, Africa, East and Southeast Asia, Oceania, Europe, and the indigenous cultures of the Americas.

- Workman Gallery of Ancient Mediterranean Cultures
- Workman Gallery of Asian Cultures
- Faletti Gallery of African Cultures
- Laubin Gallery of American Indian Cultures
- Leavitt Gallery of Middle Eastern Cultures
- Simonds Pyatt Gallery of European Cultures
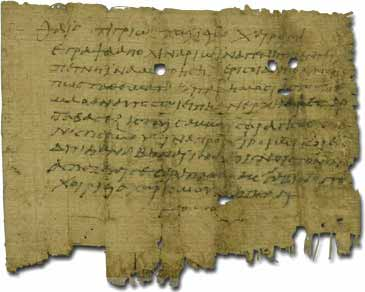
A private letter on papyrus from Oxyrhynchus, written in a Greek hand of the second century CE (Oxyrhynchus papyrus 932, (1914.21.0010)

Ancient Egyptian statue of the pharaoh Khafre (reproduction)

Cloth from Indonesia

A collection of artifacts representing ancient Greek religion

This barong ket figure is featured during temple festivals on the Island of Bali in Indonesia

An assortment of household items from Southeast Asia

Jousting armor from the Gallery of European Cultures

== Areas ==
The Spurlock Museum building offers the following public areas and facilities:

- Five feature galleries covering Africa, East Asia, Southeast Asia, and Oceania, Europe, The Americas, and The Ancient Mediterranean.
- The Campbell Gallery, featuring exhibits that change twice a year.
- The 215-seat Knight Auditorium, site of lectures by local and visiting scholars as well as performances by musicians, dancers, actors, storytellers, and choral groups.
- The Dene W. and Marie C. Zahn Learning Center, a space for small-group activities, including teacher training workshops, craft activities, and hands-on artifact opportunities.
- The World Heritage Museum Guild Educational Resource Center, the source of a wide assortment of educational materials for instructors.

== See also ==
- Champaign County Museums Network
