= Albert Austin Harding =

American academic (1880–1958)

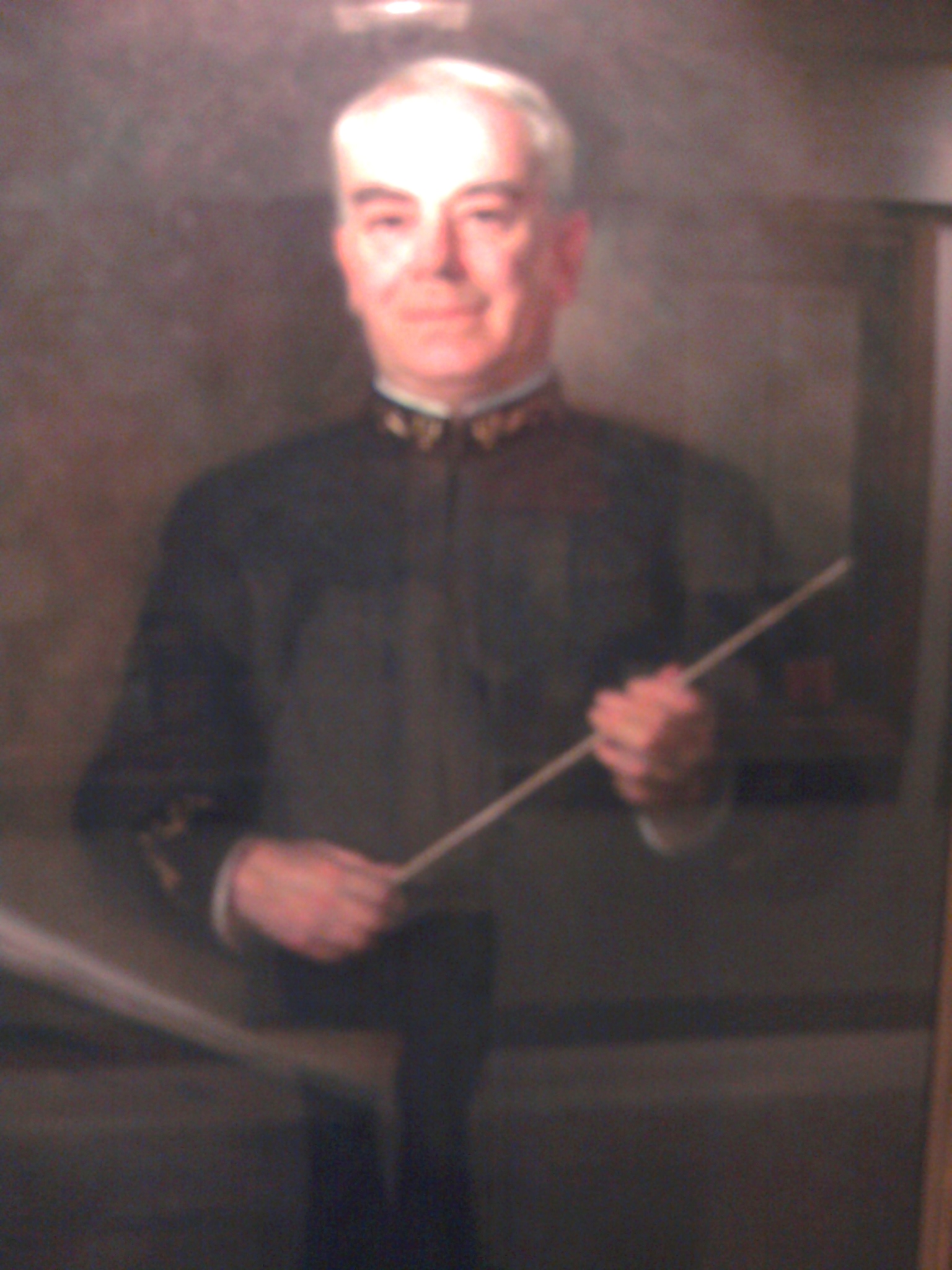

Background information
- Born: 02/10/1880; Georgetown, Illinois
- Died: 12/03/1958 Champaign, Illinois
- Occupation: Director of Bands
- Years active: 1907–1948

Albert Austin Harding (February 10, 1880 – December 3, 1958) was the first Director of Bands at the University of Illinois and the first band director at an American university to hold a position of full professorship. The Harding Band Building, the first dedicated building for a University Band Department, was named for him.

His full-length portrait painted by Earl Bradbury in 1950 hangs in the Harding Band Building.

== Early life ==
Albert Austin Harding was born February 10, 1880, in Georgetown, Illinois, the son of Conway A. and Jennie Stewart Harding. Unfortunately, Jennie died shortly after his birth, and Conway moved his son to Paris, Illinois, to live with his maternal grandparents, Vincent and Mary Stewart. He lived with them until the age of 10. After their deaths in February 1890 he went to live with his paternal grandmother, Mrs. Adelia Austin Harding, and her brother Wallace Austin in the Austin house in Paris. He lived there until he was 21.

In 1894 at age 14 Harding bought his first cornet, a French Jaubert for only nine or ten dollars. This cornet was probably the cheapest type of cornet available at that time and was nicknamed "Jawbreakers". Recognizing beauty in the instrument, he quickly mastered it and moved on to the fife. By the age of 16, he had also learned the piccolo.

He began his musical career as the bugler for the Boys Brigade in Paris. Since Paris High School did not yet have a band, he became bugler for the Paris High School Cadets. Also, he and some of his school mates formed a band called the "Bum Notes Band". Each member of the band played an unfamiliar instrument so Harding chose the baritone, a larger brass instrument having the same valve fingering as the cornet.

While still in high school he joined and eventually led the Paris Beacon Drum and Bugle Corps, named after the local newspaper the Paris Beacon. In this group he played the fife and the bugle. The corps traveled by train to Canton, Ohio in 1896 to play at a political campaign rally for presidential candidate William McKinley.

At the age of 17, he joined the Paris Concert Band. Before graduating from high school in 1899 he became the leader of the band, and later succeeded W. D. Wooley as band director. Meanwhile, his career as an independent musician was thriving, and he was invited to participate in many area musical groups including marching bands, dance bands, and orchestras.

After high school, he joined the Illinois National Guard, where he was company bugler, battalion bugler, and regimental bugler. For the most part, he was stationed at Camp Lincoln in Springfield, Illinois.

== Career as a student ==
In 1902, Harding began attending the University of Illinois in Urbana-Champaign. Almost immediately, he joined the University Military Band playing cornet and the University Orchestra playing bassoon. He was outranked in seniority by two musicians in the cornet section of the band: Carl Ginzel and E.J. Piggot. In 1904 he joined the newly formed chapter of Phi Kappa Psi fraternity where he roomed with DeLoss Funk of Funk's Grove in McLean County, Illinois. DeLoss had an automobile and was in great demand on campus because of it.

In the spring of 1905 Harding was offered a position as Teacher of Band Instruments and Assistant Director of the band by Professor Frederick Locke Lawrence, head of the School of Music. At the time, he was a junior in the College of Engineering planning to become a municipal and sanitary engineer. He considered the band position only temporary. He didn't finish his engineering degree, but he did receive a Bachelor of Music degree in 1916.

Since the School of Music was growing rapidly, Professor Lawrence had less time available to spend with the band. Thus, Harding's responsibilities in the band gradually increased and beginning in September 1905 Professor Lawrence never raised a baton over the band again. Harding led all rehearsals, provided all band instruction, and did all individual instruction on band instruments after the fall tryouts.

On 3 March 1906, he conducted his first concert in the Armory (now the Kenney Gym Annex) on Springfield Avenue, appearing on the concert program as Conductor. This concert, called the Sixteenth Annual Concert, was one in a long series of incorrectly numbered ″annual concerts″ and ″anniversary concerts″. The first formal band concert of record had been played 3 May 1892 at the Walker Opera House in Champaign.

== Director of bands ==
In 1907 Harding was appointed Director of Bands after two years of conducting the band. With this appointment the University of Illinois became the "first university to create a distinct band department under a director of bands". He was listed as both conductor and director of the Military Band for the first time in the program for the 1908 annual spring concert. Later he earned a full professorship in music, becoming the first band director to do this on an American campus.

On the evening of 26 April 1911 the Military Band played the first Twilight Concert on the quadrangle in front of the University Auditorium (now Foellinger Auditorium). These popular concerts were started by Director Harding following a request by the university president Edmund J. James that the band do something more for the cultural life of the university. The spring series of Twilight Concerts in April and May continued through 1984. Summer session Twilight Concerts in June and July played by the Summer Band on the Illini Union terrace continue to the present.

On Commencement Day, 11 June 1913, Harding married Margaret Rogers, a high school friend from Paris. He was 33 and she was 32. They had one daughter, Jane Austin Harding.

As a student Harding had played in several off-campus organizations to earn money. He played at the Walker Opera House and joined the Knights of Pythias Band, eventually becoming its conductor. In 1910 he became director of the Urbana Commercial Club Band for its summer concert series. Because many players, including some of Harding's own university students, played in both these bands, he merged the two into an Associated Musicians Band in 1913 to play concerts and local events. Harding conducted this band for several years.

From 1918 to 1931 he conducted the University Orchestra in addition to his duties as Director of Bands. Frederic B. Stiven, director of the School of Music, replaced him as the University Orchestra conductor in 1931.

By 1919, following World War I, the bands had expanded to three organizations. The first band was designated the Concert Band and was increased to 100 members from every college in the university plus a few faculty members who qualified and wanted to play. Military duties were taken over by the First and Second Regiment Bands conducted by the band assistants. These two bands also functioned as concert groups. From 1926 onward the band assistants also took over drills and performances of the football band, forerunner of the Marching Illini. In July 1922 there was sufficient interest among students, faculty and townspeople that a Summer Band was organized at the university to play Twilight Concerts similar to those given in the spring. This band has continued relatively unchanged since that time.

When Harding became conductor there was very little original music written for band by outstanding composers. Published concert music consisted mainly of transcriptions of orchestral music for small bands of limited ability and instrumentation, so he began to transcribe brilliant, colorful orchestral compositions to fit the instrumentation and ability of his band. These transcriptions were done under an agreement with publishers that they be used exclusively by the University of Illinois bands and not be copied or loaned out to other bands. The list grew to more than 150 handwritten manuscripts by the time he retired in 1948.

He continued to increase the dimensions of the band program by adding concert band music and his own transcriptions of symphonic and chamber pieces to performances at ceremonies and sporting events. He also enforced professionalism within the bands. The Concert Band became unique, especially because of his interest in unusual instruments. Not only did he utilize typical band instruments but in 1924 he added many unusual instruments such as the basset horn, saxonet, B-flat bass sarrusophone, E-flat bass sarrusophone, CC contra-bass sarrusophone, terz flute, A-flat flute, musette, valve trombone, tenor antoniophone, bass antoniophone, bellstedtromba, bass cornophone and ophicleide. John Philip Sousa called the Concert Band "the world's greatest college band."

The Concert Band became well known away from the campus through annual spring tours and weekly radio broadcasts that were well established by 1927. Band concerts in the University Auditorium were popular and well attended by students, faculty and townspeople. The Concert Band always played a formal concert for the June graduation festivities in addition to playing for the Commencement ceremonies.

Harding emphasized the importance of sight reading in his bands. In addition to the dozen or so selections prepared for the spring concert the Concert Band would read and maintain a large repertoire of music to be taken on tour. In 1931 tour audiences could select encores from a list of 87 compositions that the band members carried with them for tour concerts.

On 29 October 1933 the Concert Band made an all expenses paid trip to Chicago to play at the Century of Progress International Exposition, the World′s Fair. The band played a one-hour concert in the Hall of States and another in the Hall of Science. They returned home the same day.

While Harding was director, the Concert Band had many guest conductors. The most legendary was John Philip Sousa, also known as the "March King". On March 20, 1930, the band performed a "Complimentary Concert". Harding conducted the first half of the concert, and Sousa conducted the second half. Among the works Harding conducted were those composed by Saint-Saëns, Respighi, Haydn Wood, Glazunov, and Rimsky-Korsakov. Sousa then conducted various works including a "Symposium of Marches by the March King" which consisted of "The University of Illinois", "Semper Fidelis", and "The Stars and Stripes Forever". Other guest conductors at various times were Edwin Franko Goldman, Henry Fillmore, Frank Simon, Harold Bachman, Guy Holmes, and Victor Grabel.

Harding also started the Illinois Band Clinic. According to John Grashel, Ph.D., the Illinois Band Clinic was a precursor to the Midwest Clinic, now the Mid-West International Band and Orchestra Clinic held annually in Chicago, Illinois. In 1929 the idea of a clinic for high school band directors grew out of the annual High School Teachers Conference held at the university. Harding and his assistants organized the first clinic held on 9–10 January 1930. Along with demonstrations of contest music played by the university bands there were meetings and discussions of band topics. The clinics were discontinued in the 1950s. In 1955 they were replaced with the Festival of Concert Band Music, a two–day series of formal concerts by the three university bands.

In January 1945 Margaret Harding was bedridden. The 16th annual band clinic was in session at the time, so Clarence Sawhill, Assistant Director of Bands, conducted the band clinic. On January 16, 1945, Margaret died. She was survived by her husband and their only child Jane Austin Harding.

After 41 years of being the director of bands, Harding retired in 1948 at the age of 68. His assistant Mark Hindsley became Interim Director and was appointed Director in 1950, a position he held until his retirement in 1970.

== Relationship with Sousa ==
Harding and Sousa shared a "very close personal and professional relationship". According to archivist Phyllis W. Danner, the Sousa band was performing in Champaign, Illinois, in 1906 when they met at a reception. A "mentoring relationship developed between the two… and the friendship between the two lasted until Sousa's death nearly three decades later". Sousa planned on giving the university the materials from his band library as a "gesture of his high esteem" for Harding and his band. However, this was not written in Sousa′s will when he died in 1932. In order to obtain the collection, Harding wrote letters to the Sousa family and their attorneys. After a few months the family agreed, and Ray Dvorak, the band assistant at the time, traveled to New York City to retrieve the collection. Dvorak sorted through the materials in Sousa's band library and "oversaw the packing and shipping of 39 trunks and two boxes containing 9,700 pounds of music and other materials". These materials are now housed at the Sousa Archives and Center for American Music, which is open to the public.

== Death and accomplishments ==
Harding was ill after his retirement. On December 3, 1958, Albert Austin Harding died of cancer in Champaign, Illinois. The Band Building had been dedicated in March of that year.

Harding served as the treasurer of the American Bandmasters Association for several years. From 1937 to 1938, he was the ABA's President. In 1956, he succeeded John Philip Sousa and Edwin Franko Goldman as Honorary Life President. For the College Band Directors National Association, he became an Honorary Life President, and he was also a founding member of the Alpha Xi chapter of the Phi Mu Alpha Sinfonia.

He received Honorary Doctor of Music degrees from Phillips University, Enid, Oklahoma and Davidson College, Davidson, North Carolina, in 1936.

The "A.A. Harding March" composed by Carl Mader and F.M. Bierow in Harding's honor was published by the Columbia Band Instruments Company in Chicago. Harding was uncomfortable playing a march with his name as the title so he cut the titles off the band parts and always referred to it as "March number 20". When the Summer Band played the march on the 27 June 2019 Twilight Concert the band parts for number 20 still had no titles.

As Director of Bands Harding transcribed more than 150 orchestral compositions for his concert bands. Most of these remain unpublished. However he allowed six transcriptions to be published by Neil Kjos Music Company so that the royalties could be used to fund the A.A. Harding Awards given annually to outstanding band members. The six with dates of publication are:

- Finale from ″Death and Transfiguration″ — Richard Strauss (1950)
- A Hero′s Courtship from ″Ein Heldenleben″ — Richard Strauss (1956)
- Introduction and Wedding March from ″The Golden Cockerel″ — Nikolai Rimsky−Korsakov (1957)
- Overture to ″The Tsar′s Bride″ — Nikolai Rimsky−Korsakov (1954)
- Psyche and Eros from ″Psyche″ — César Franck (1952)
- Valzer Campestre from ″Suite Siciliana″ — Giuseppe Marinuzzi (1957)

In 2021 Harding was inducted into The Guild of the University of Illinois College of Fine and Applied Arts. This is a group of noteworthy alumni, faculty and friends of the college who are recognized posthumously for their contributions to the arts. This honor is a further indication that his influence has continued through the years following his death.

== Harding Band Building ==
The University of Illinois Bands moved into the Band Building in 1957 (renamed Harding Band Building in 1974). In 1928 the bands had moved from basement space in University Hall into the Military Office Building, a 1915 wooden frame structure east of the Armory, and remained there until 1956 when work was started on the new building occupying the same site at 1103 South Sixth Street, Champaign. This new building was the "first building built solely for use by a college band program." Today, it is home to the University of Illinois Bands, the Sousa Archives and Center for American Music, and "one of the world's greatest band libraries". Most of the rehearsal and practice rooms were built to achieve maximum acoustical effectiveness. These include a main rehearsal room, six sectional rehearsal rooms, and twelve practice rooms. Also, the band library utilizes five rooms; the Sousa Archives and Center for American Music and the Carl Busch Instrument Collection occupy five more rooms.

== Sources ==
- Burford, Cary Clive (1952). We're loyal to you, Illinois the story of the University of Illinois bands under Albert Austin Harding for 43 years, superimposed upon glimpses of university history during the half-century of Harding leadership on campus. The Interstate. OCLC 872196706.
