= J. W. Pepper & Son =

American sheet music retailer

J. W. Pepper & Son, Inc.
- Company type: Private
- Industry: Retailing
- Founded: Philadelphia, 1876; 150 years ago
- Founder: James Welsh Pepper
- Headquarters: 191 Sheree Boulevard, Exton, Pennsylvania, United States
- Number of locations: 4
- Products: Sheet music, music accessories, music software
- Website: jwpepper.com

J. W. Pepper & Son, Inc. is a privately owned, American sheet music retailer based in Exton, Pennsylvania. The company is credited with being the largest sheet music retailer in the world, with over 750,000 titles in its catalog. Customers who buy music from Pepper include individual musicians, community organizations and professional ensembles, with the main customer base being school and church music directors.

== History ==
James Welsh Pepper was born in Philadelphia in 1853, and died in the same city on July 28, 1919. He was an American music publisher and musical instrument maker.

In 1876, Pepper founded a publishing house in his home city which printed music tutorial books and a magazine called Musical Times, which ceased production in 1912. Additionally, Pepper produced musical instruments such as drums until 1910, the year in which J. W. Pepper & Son was founded. Pepper is credited to have built the first sousaphone around 1890, although there have been some disputes to this claim.

== Company details ==
J. W. Pepper has one retail store located in San Antonio, Texas, along with two distribution centers dedicated to order fulfillment and shipping. In spring of 2009, Pepper added two new warehouses to the company's distribution network. From 1984 to 2013, the national headquarters was located in Paoli, Pennsylvania, approximately 20 miles (32 km) west of Philadelphia. In October 2013, the company's headquarters moved further west to Exton, Pennsylvania.
