= Sousaphone =

Brass musical instrument

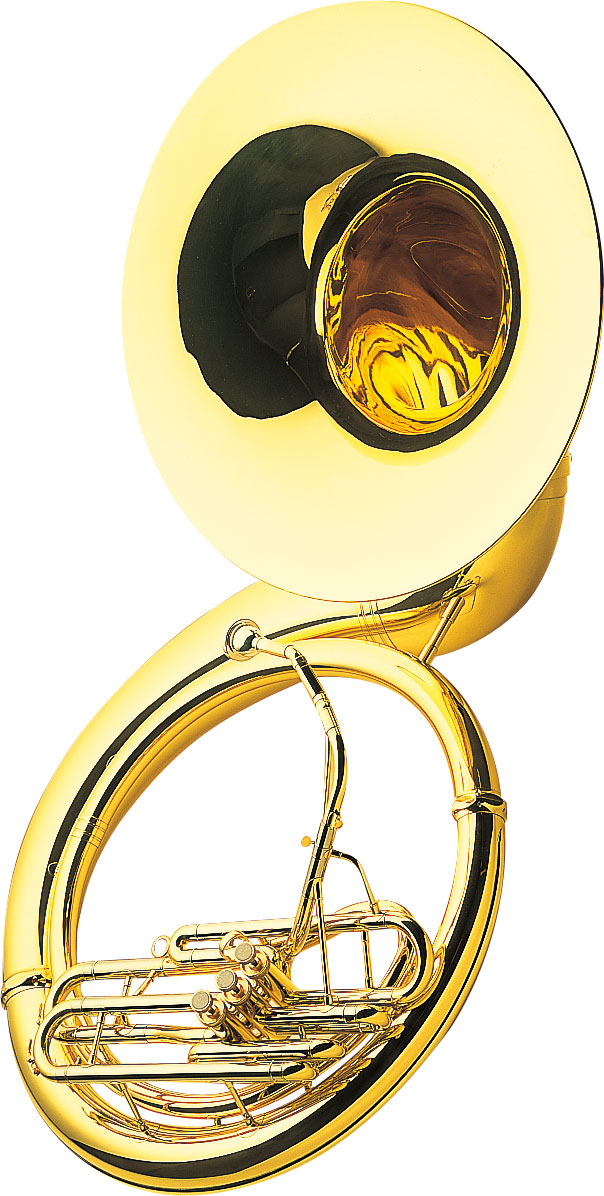
- A sousaphone.

Brass instrument
- Classification: Aerophone; Wind; Brass
- Hornbostel–Sachs classification: 423.231.2 (Valved lip-reed aerophone with wide conical bore)
- Inventor(s): J. W. Pepper, John Philip Sousa
- Developed: c. 1893

Playing range
- Range of a B♭ sousaphone with three valves

Related instruments
- Helicon; Tuba; Contrabass Bugle; Cornu (horn)

The sousaphone (/ˈsuːzəfoʊn/ SOO-zə-fohn) is a brass musical instrument in the tuba family. It was first created around 1893 by J. W. Pepper as a modification of the helicon, at the direction of American bandleader John Philip Sousa, after whom the instrument was named. Sousa intended the bass sound of his helicons to better project above the heads of the band, and into the auditorium. Like the tuba, sound is produced by moving air past the lips, causing them to vibrate or "buzz" into a large cupped mouthpiece. Like the helicon, the modern instrument is bent in a circle to fit around the body of the musician, and ends in a large, flaring bell that is pointed forward, projecting the sound ahead of the player. Because of the ease of carrying and the direction of sound, it is widely employed in marching bands, as well as various other musical genres. Sousaphones were originally made of brass. Beginning in the mid-20th century, some sousaphones have also been made of lighter materials, such as fiberglass and plastic.

== History ==
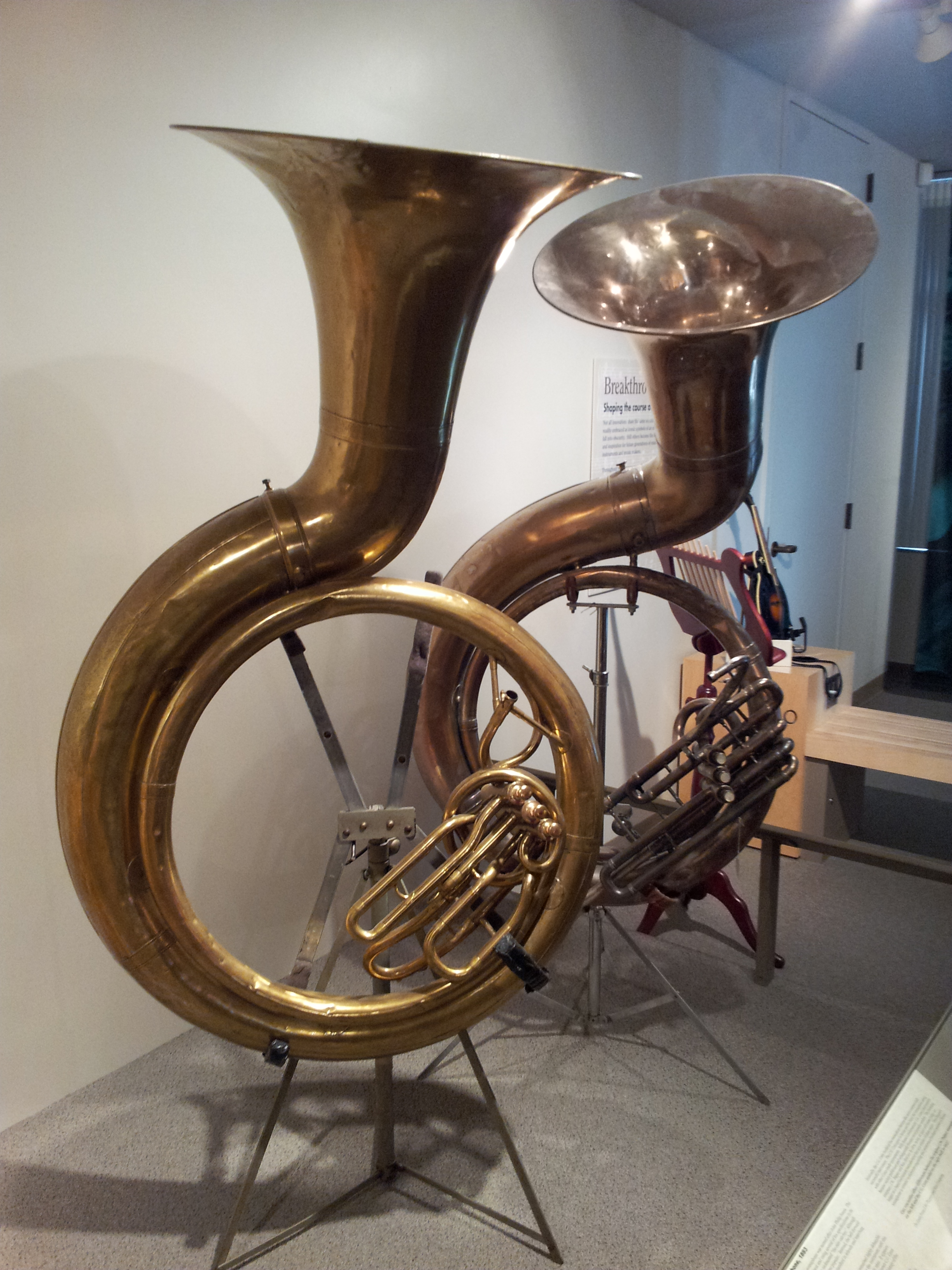
1893 sousaphones at the Museum of Making Music

The first sousaphone was built by James Walsh Pepper in 1893 at the request of John Philip Sousa, who was dissatisfied with the helicons in use by the United States Marine Band. Some sources credit C. G. Conn with its construction, because of the first sousaphone he built later in 1898. Sousa wanted a tuba-like instrument that would send sound upward and over the band, much like a concert (upright) tuba. The new instrument had an oversized bell pointing straight up, rather than the directional bell of a normal helicon.

The sousaphone was initially developed as a concert instrument rather than for marching. Sousa wanted the new instrument for the professional band which he started after leaving the Marines, and this band marched only once. Sousa mainly used sousaphones built by C. G. Conn. Although less balanced on a player's body than a helicon, because of the large spectacular bell high in the air, the sousaphone retained the tuba-like sound by widening the bore and throat of the instrument significantly. Its upright bell led to the instrument being dubbed a "rain-catcher". Some versions of this design allowed the bell to also rotate forward, projecting the sound to the front of the band. This bell configuration remained the standard for several decades and is the standard today.

The instrument proved practical for marching, and by 1908 the United States Marine Band adopted it.

In 1908, Conn designed a "Wonderphone helicon" in B♭, the first version with the characteristic extra 90° bend to make a forward-facing bell. Early sousaphones had 22-inch-diameter (560 mm) bells, with 24-inch (610 mm) bells popular in the 1920s. From the mid-1930s onward, sousaphone bells have been standardized at a diameter of 26 inches (660 mm). Some larger sousaphones (Monster, Grand, Jumbo, Giant or Grand Jumbo) were produced in limited quantities.

=== Europe ===
When the announcement of Conn's new instrument, "The Sousaphone," appeared in the January 22, 1898 edition of The Music Trade Review, it explained that "It will be a feature of Sousa's band during the forthcoming European tour."

That tour didn't launch until April 30, 1900, but before they set sail, Conn, who expected to wow Europe with his instruments (which he generously donated to the band for that very purpose!), explained that "The bass section is magnificent, comprising the great Conn Sousaphone, played by Mr. Herman Conrad, the monster American Model and Wonder Double Bb Basses, played by Messrs. Helleberg, Seavey and Del Negro" (C. G. Conn's Truth, April 1900, vol. 4, no. 8, p.17).

=== Asia ===
The Philippine Constabulary Band in 1904.

The Philippines is one of the first Asian countries to feature the sousaphone, which is mainly in the Philippine Constabulary Band.

== Construction ==
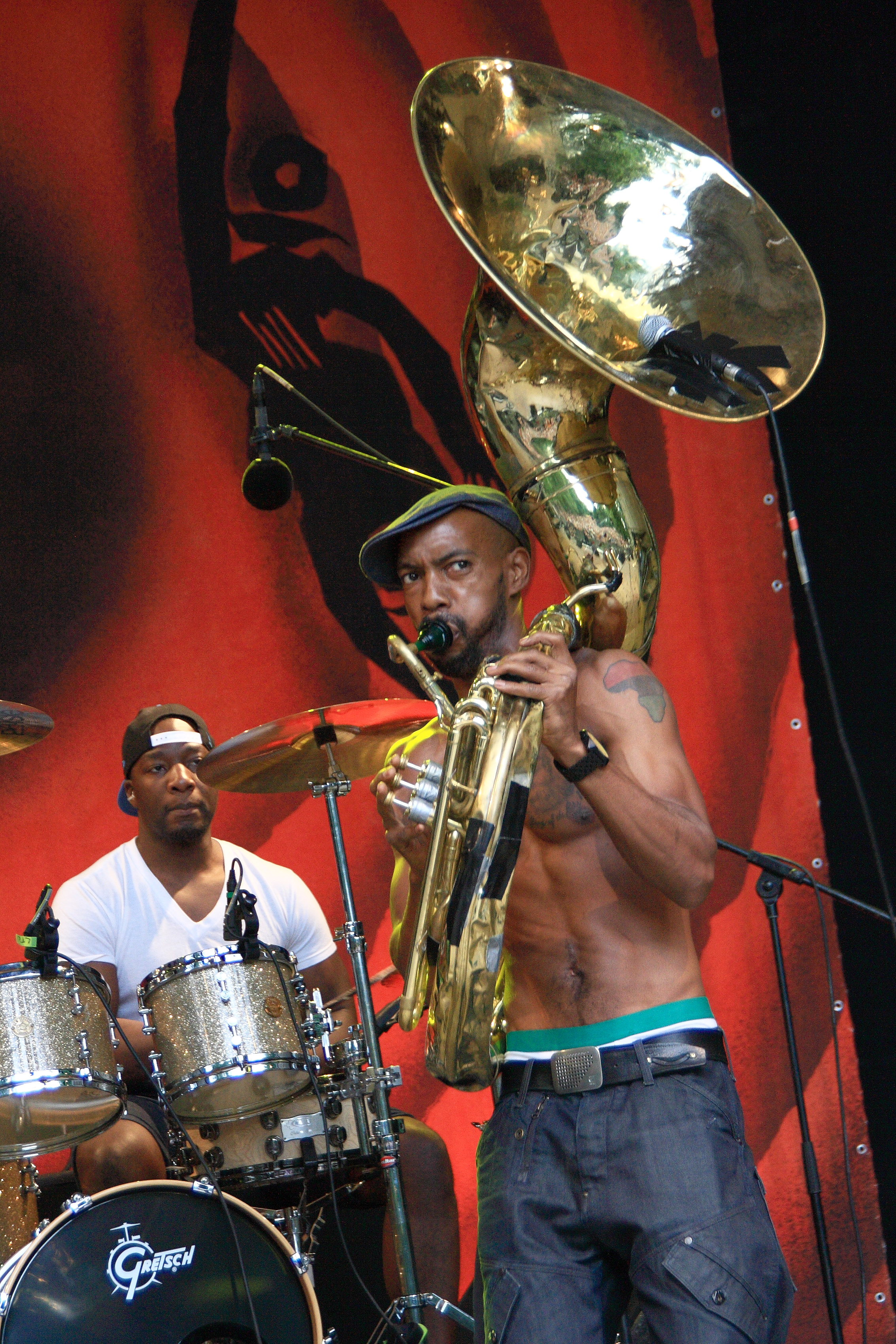
Sousaphone player Tycho Cohran with the Hypnotic Brass Ensemble, at the TFF.Rudolstadt 2012

The sousaphone is a valved brass instrument with the same tube length and musical range as other tubas. The sousaphone's shape is such that the bell is above the tubist's head and projecting forward. The valves are situated directly in front of the musician slightly above the waist and all of the weight rests on the left shoulder. The bell is normally detachable from the instrument body to facilitate transportation and storage. Except for the instrument's general shape and appearance, the sousaphone is technically similar to a tuba.

For simplicity and light weight, modern sousaphones almost always use three non-compensating piston valves in their construction, in direct contrast to their concert counterparts' large variation in number, type, and orientation. Both the tuba and sousaphone are semi-conical brass instruments. No valved brass instrument can be entirely conical, since the middle section containing the valves must be cylindrical. While the degree of bore conicity does affect the timbre of the instrument, much as in a cornet and trumpet, or a euphonium and a trombone, the bore profile of a sousaphone is similar to that of most tubas.

To facilitate making the mouthpiece accessible to players of different height or body shapes, most sousaphones contain a detachable tubing gooseneck which arises from the lead pipe on the upwind side of the valves. One or two slightly-angled bit(s) (short tubing lengths) are inserted into the gooseneck, and then the mouthpiece is inserted into the terminal bit. This arrangement may be adjusted in height and yaw angle to place the mouthpiece comfortably at the player's lips.

=== Materials ===
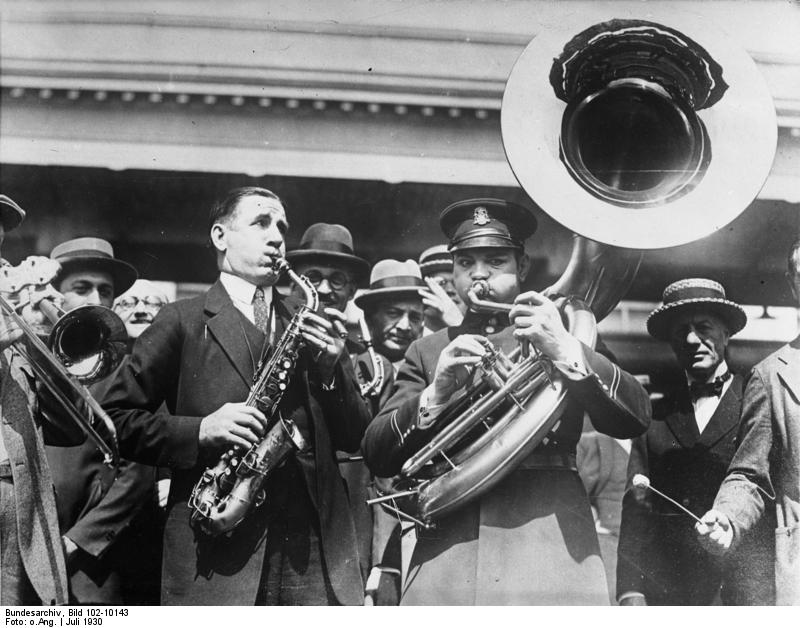
Saxophone and sousaphone players at a charity festival in Chicago, July 1930

Most sousaphones are manufactured from sheet brass, usually yellow or silver, with silver, lacquer, and gold plating options, much like many brass instruments. However, the sousaphone (uniquely) is also commonly seen manufactured from fiberglass, due to its lower cost, greater durability, and significantly lighter weight.

The weight of a sousaphone can be between 18 pounds (8 kg) and 50 pounds (23 kg).

=== Pitch ===
Most modern sousaphones are made in the key of BB♭ (Low B Flat) and like tubas (which are commonly made in pitches of BB♭, CC, EE♭, and F) the instrument's part is written in "concert pitch", not transposed by key for a specific instrument. Although sousaphones may have a more restricted range than their concert tuba counterpart (most sousaphones have 3 valves instead of 4 to reduce weight), generally they can all play the same music and usually have parts written in the bass clef and the indicated octave is played (unlike double bass or electric bass that sound an octave lower than the indicated note). Many older sousaphones were pitched in the key of E♭, but current production of sousaphones in that key is limited.

== Varieties ==
Although most major instrument manufacturers have made, and many continue to make, sousaphones, Conn and King (H. N. White) instruments are generally agreed among players to be the standards against which other sousaphones are judged for tone quality and playability. Perhaps the most highly regarded sousaphone ever built is the 0.734-inch-bore (18.6 mm) Conn model 20K, introduced in the mid-1930s and still in production. Some players, especially those who find the 20K too heavy for marching, prefer the slightly smaller 0.687-inch-bore (17.4 mm) King model 1250, first made in the late 1920s and also still in production as model 2350. Historically, Holton, York and Martin sousaphones have also been considered fine horns.

Very large bore (>= 0.750 inch) sousaphones, with oversized bells as large as 32 inches (81 cm) in diameter, were made by Conn ("Grand Jumbo" [46K (3-valve) & 48K (4-valve)]) and King ("Jumbo" [1265 (3- & 4-valve versions)] & "Giant" [1270 (3-valve) & 1271 (4-valve)]) in the mid-1920s and 1930s, and by Martin, York, & Buescher, but they disappeared from the catalogs during the Depression or at the onset of World War II. Because of their weight and cost, few were made and even fewer survive, especially the 4-valve models.

=== Fiberglass ===
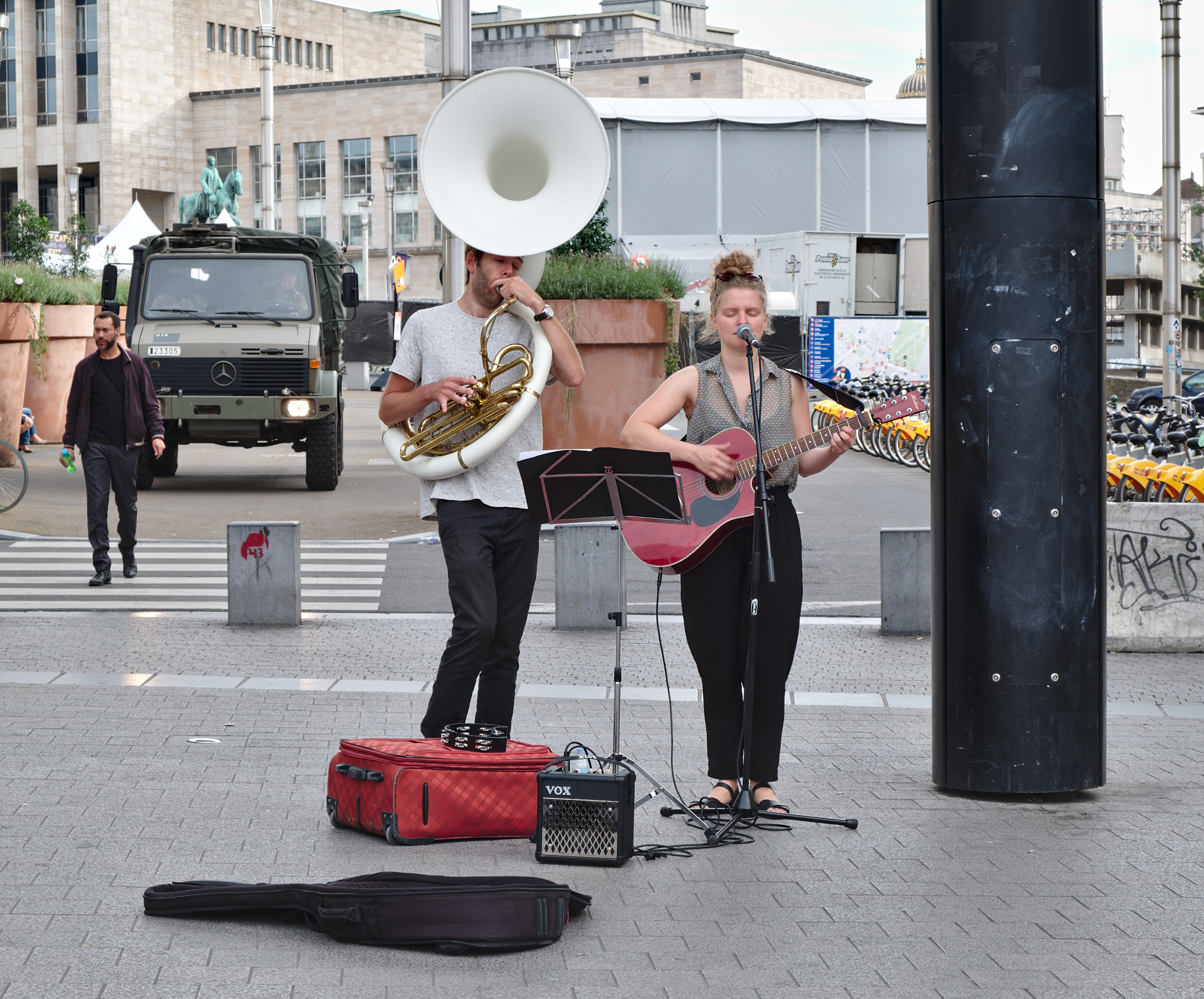
Street performer playing a Conn 36K fiberglass sousaphone

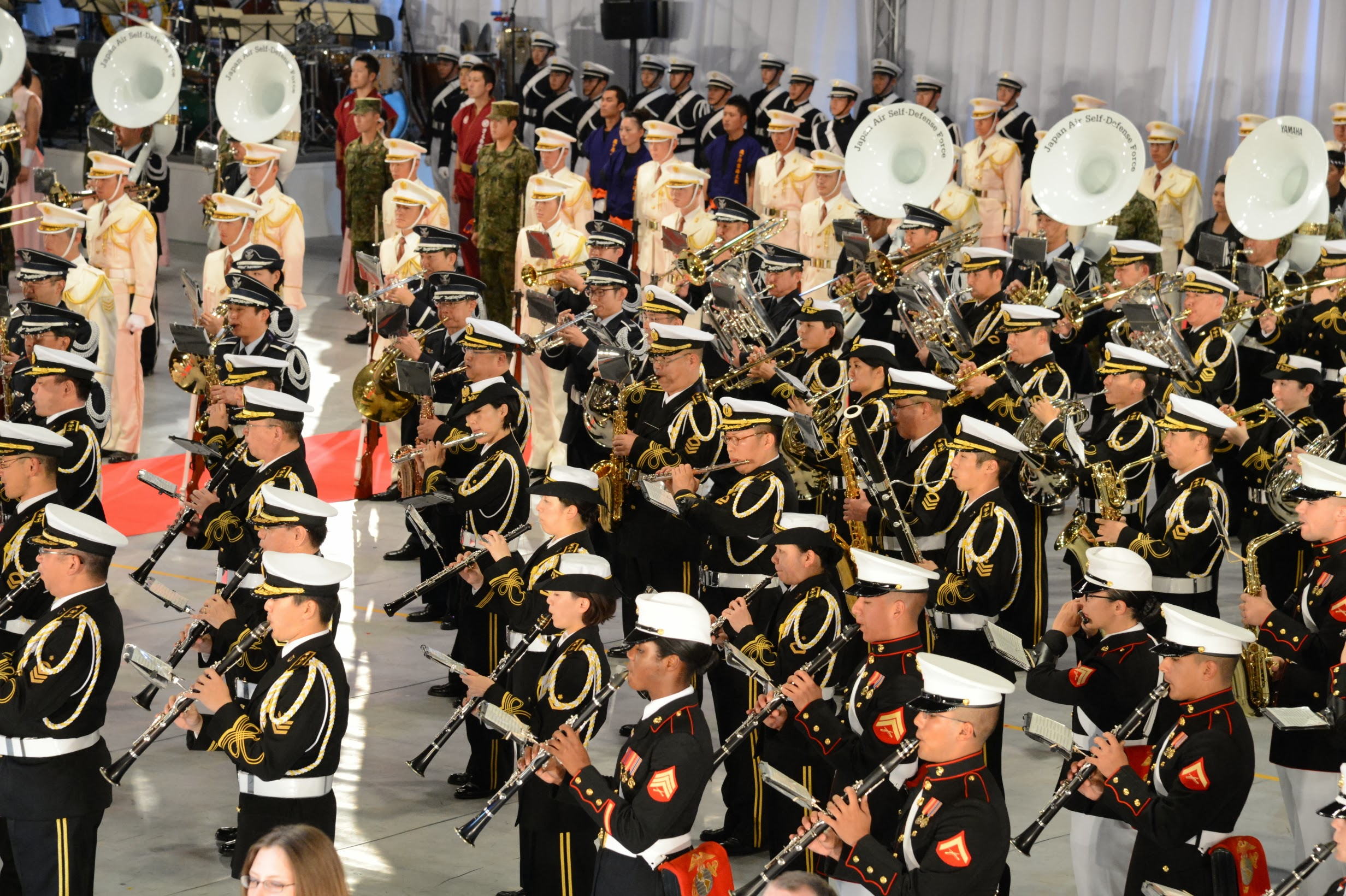
Fiberglass sousaphones played by the Japan Ground Self-Defense Force Music Corps

Since 1961, sousaphones have been available made of fiberglass reinforced plastics instead of brass; RMC-Reynolds announced their new 18-pound instrument that year (branded as "Reynolds" or "Martin") and Conn's 16-3/4-pound 36K debuted soon thereafter. King first advertised its new 18-1/2 pound "1280" model in 1964, as did Holton with its FG-122 and Selmer with its Buescher-division instrument. Olds first advertised its fiberglass instrument in 1966. Fiberglass sousaphones can be found commonly in younger marching bands, such as middle school ensembles due to their lighter weight. Fiberglass models have also been proven a cost-effective alternative to brass models. In the early 2000's, several notable brands introduced models that include a fiberglass body with the addition of an all-brass bell.

=== Additional valves ===
In the 1920s and 1930s, four-valved sousaphones were often used by professional players, especially E♭ sousaphones; today, however, four-valved B♭ sousaphones are uncommon and are prized by collectors, especially those made by Conn, King (H. N. White), and Holton. Jupiter Company started production of four-valve BB♭ sousaphones in the late 2000s, and Dynasty USA makes a four-valve BB♭ sousaphone as well. Criticisms of the fourth valve on a sousaphone center on additional weight, although the fourth valve improves intonation and facilitates playing of the lower register.

Due to the large size of most sousaphones, the sub-contra register (for which the fourth valve is largely intended) is already covered by alternate resonances, known as "false tones". Many beginners are not aware of the false-tone resonances on their sousaphones because these notes reside in the sub-contra register, which is nearly impossible for most beginners to access. Some professionals develop a "raised embouchure" to securely play these notes. This is where either the upper or lower lip (depending on the player) takes up most of the mouthpiece area. The embouchure provides almost twice the room for vibration of the single lip (compared to the 50–50 embouchure).

=== Non-American sousaphones ===
Asian sousaphones made in Japan, China, and India are gaining popularity in the street band market. In Switzerland and Southern Germany, "Guggenmusik" bands often use these instruments that provide great display and passable tone. Most are tuned in E♭. Brands like Zweiss with older British designs make affordable sousaphones that have broken the €500 barrier. These are mostly in the medium-bell size of 23 inches (580 mm). Chinese brands are mostly reverse-engineered models and quite passable. Sousaphones are getting more common in Japan, mainly the Japan Ground Self-Defense Force Music Corps, as well as Japanese schools.

== Special effects ==
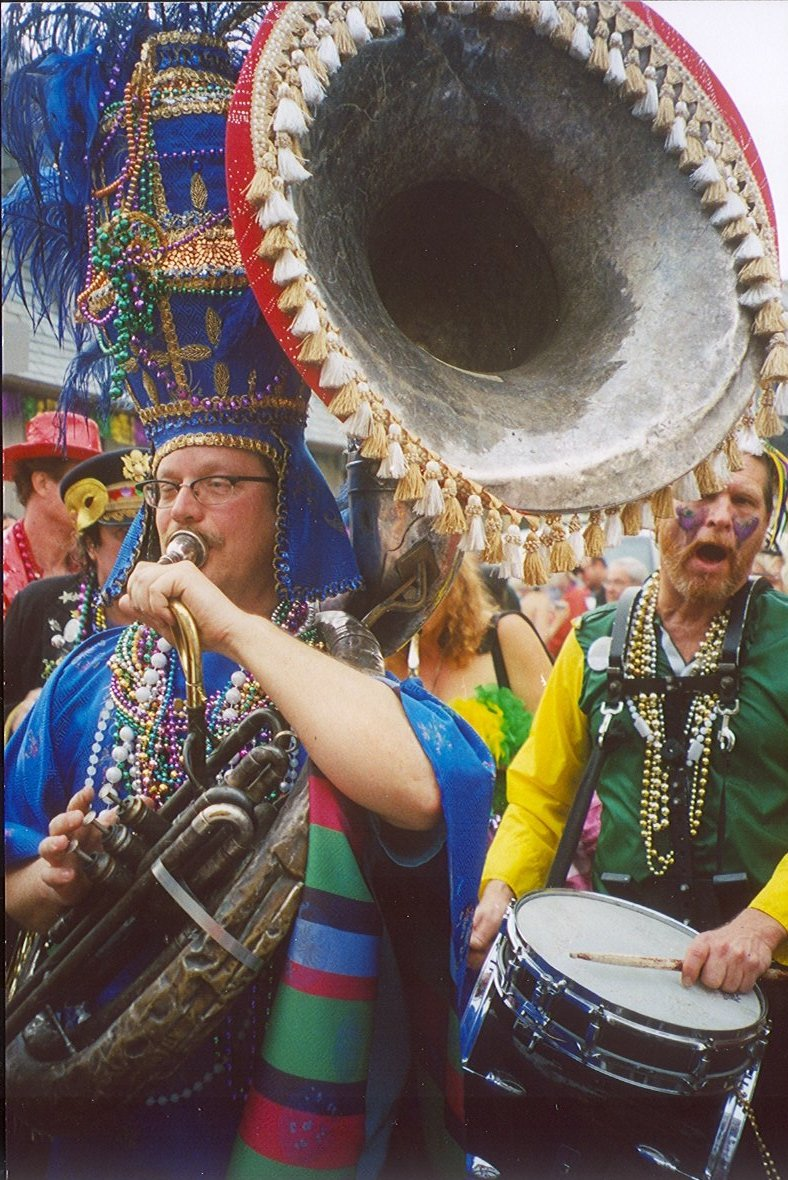
Costumed sousaphone player, New Orleans, Mardi Gras Day 2005

In large marching bands of the United States, the bell is often covered with a tight fitting cloth, called a sock, which enables the sousaphone section to spell out the school's name, initials, or mascot. The Leland Stanford Junior University Marching Band Tööbz! have a tradition of painting the front surface of their sousaphone bells with a variety of images.

Sousaphone players are also known to perform the 'flaming tubas', in which flash paper is ignited in the bell, thus making it appear as if the musician is breathing fire. David Silverman developed a propane powered flaming sousaphone with a trigger valve to control an array of flame jets across the top of the bell of his horn. The Yale Precision Marching Band has made a tradition of setting fire to the tops of the bells of their sousaphones, including in the fall of 1992 when sousaphones served as the "candles" of a "wedding cake" formed by the band when two band alumni were married during a halftime show. They also utilize what they refer to as the "Überphone", a sousaphone that was disassembled from its coiled format and welded back together on a twelve-foot frame to extend straight up from the player's shoulders.

== School marching bands ==
=== United States ===
John Philip Sousa was a benefactor of the University of Illinois music program and a friend of the university's Director of Bands Albert Austin Harding. The Marching Illini became the first band to march in a football halftime show, and were the first band to use sousaphones on the field.

The sousaphone sections of some marching bands have developed specialized performance traditions. The University of California Marching Band Bass section traditionally "struts" during the band's pregame show. During the "strut" the section separates from the rest of the band, circles the North goal post, and rejoins the band to complete the Script Cal. The University of Southern California Trojan Marching Band sousaphones play John Williams' "Imperial March" from Star Wars in single file when crossing streets on their way to and from performances on the USC campus. When The Ohio State University Marching Band performs its traditional Script Ohio formation, a senior sousaphone player dots the "i".

The Fightin' Texas Aggie Band sousaphone section (called "Bass Horns" within the university) execute a distinct two-step and four-step counter-march during marching performances. During halftime performances this is accompanied (specifically for the last rank consisting all of 12 bass horns) by a "huh! huh!" from the crowd.

The University of Delaware Fightin' Blue Hen Marching Band has several traditions involving sousaphone players. During pre-game, they branch off from the rest of the band. From here, the sousaphone players run in a snake around the field jumping to drum line cadence. At most pre-games they act out a skit as well. At post game, "In My Life" by The Beatles is played featuring a sousaphone solo while the band sings.

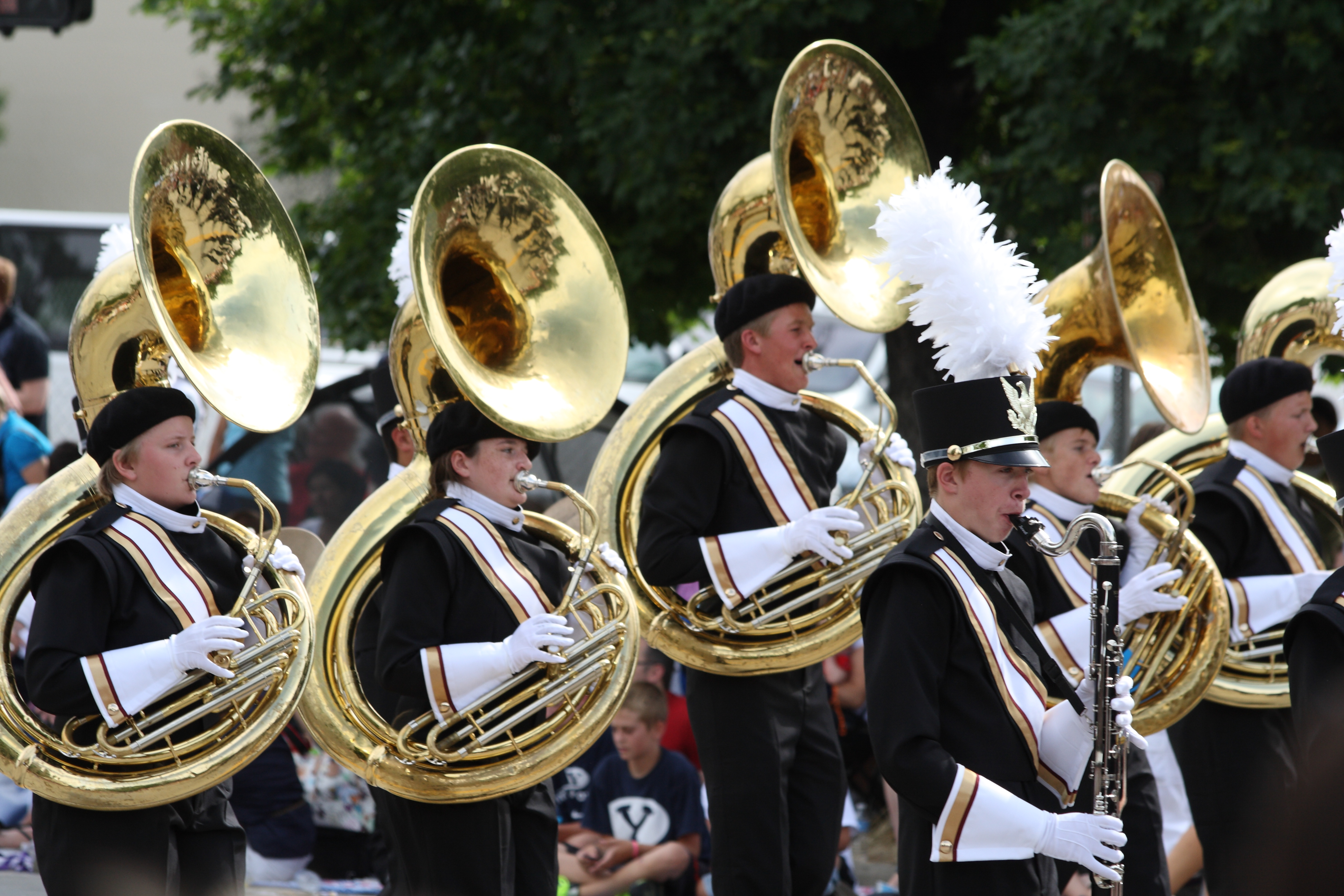
Sousaphones being played by marching band at Freedom Festival 2011

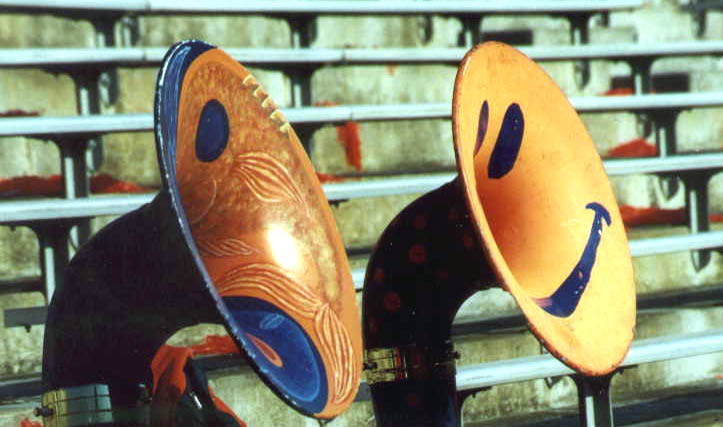
Painted bells of sousaphones from the Virginia Pep Band

=== Japan ===
Sousaphones are one of the instruments featured in the Kyoto Tachibana Junior and Senior High School's band, which is the Kyoto Tachibana SHS Band (brass band), known as the Orange Devils, have participated in the All Japan Marching Contest many times, and have won several gold prizes. They have also been invited to the Rose Parade in the United States several times. In 2022, they were invited to a National Day event in Taiwan. The football club has won several tournaments in Kyoto Prefecture and Kinki.

The sousaphone is also one of the instruments featued in Waseda Setsuryo Junior High School-High School, mainly the Waseda Setsuryo High School Wind Band.

The sousaphone is also featured as part of the Shijonawate Gakuen High School brass band.

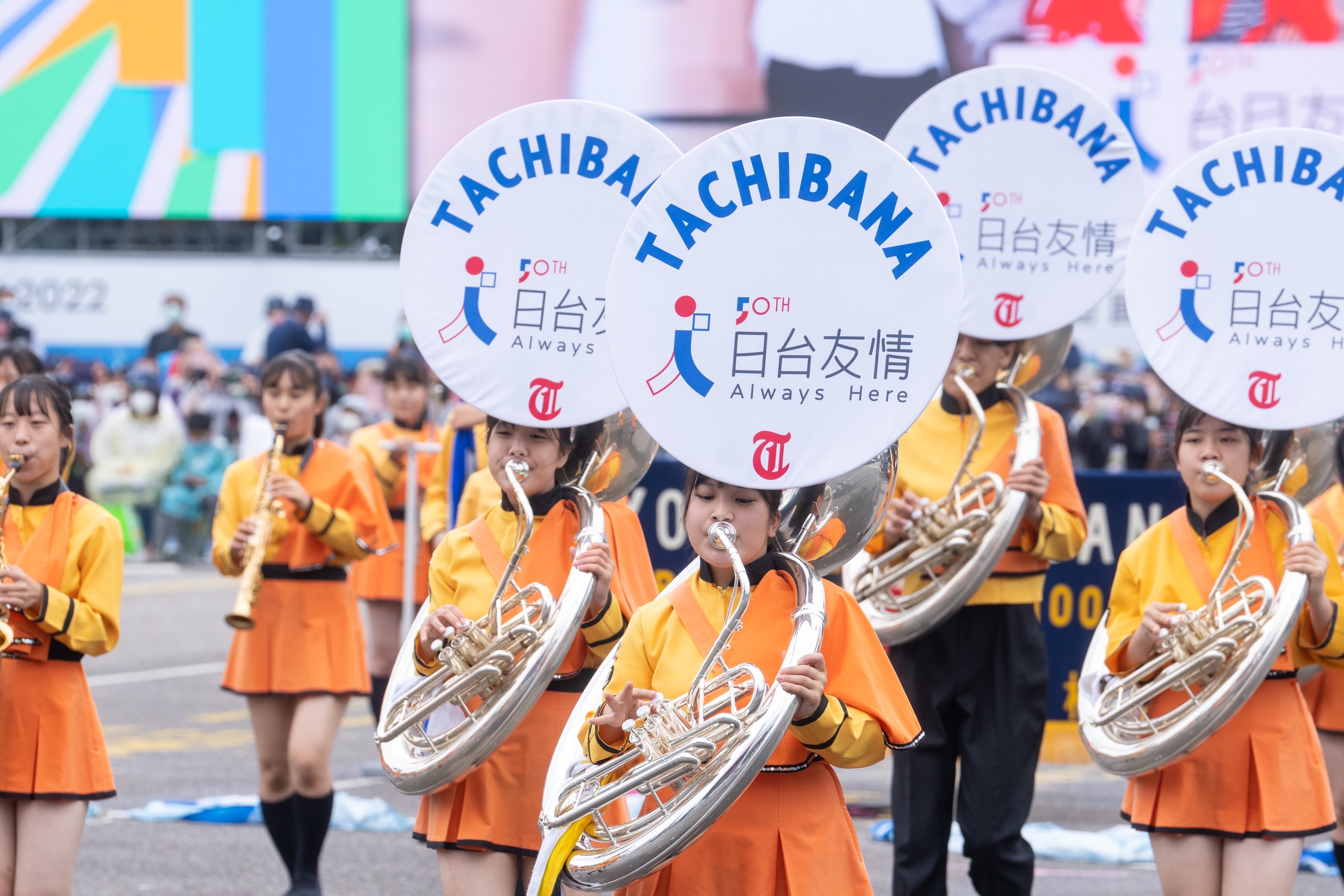
Sousaphones in the Kyoto Tachibana SHS Band.

== Musical genres ==
=== North America ===
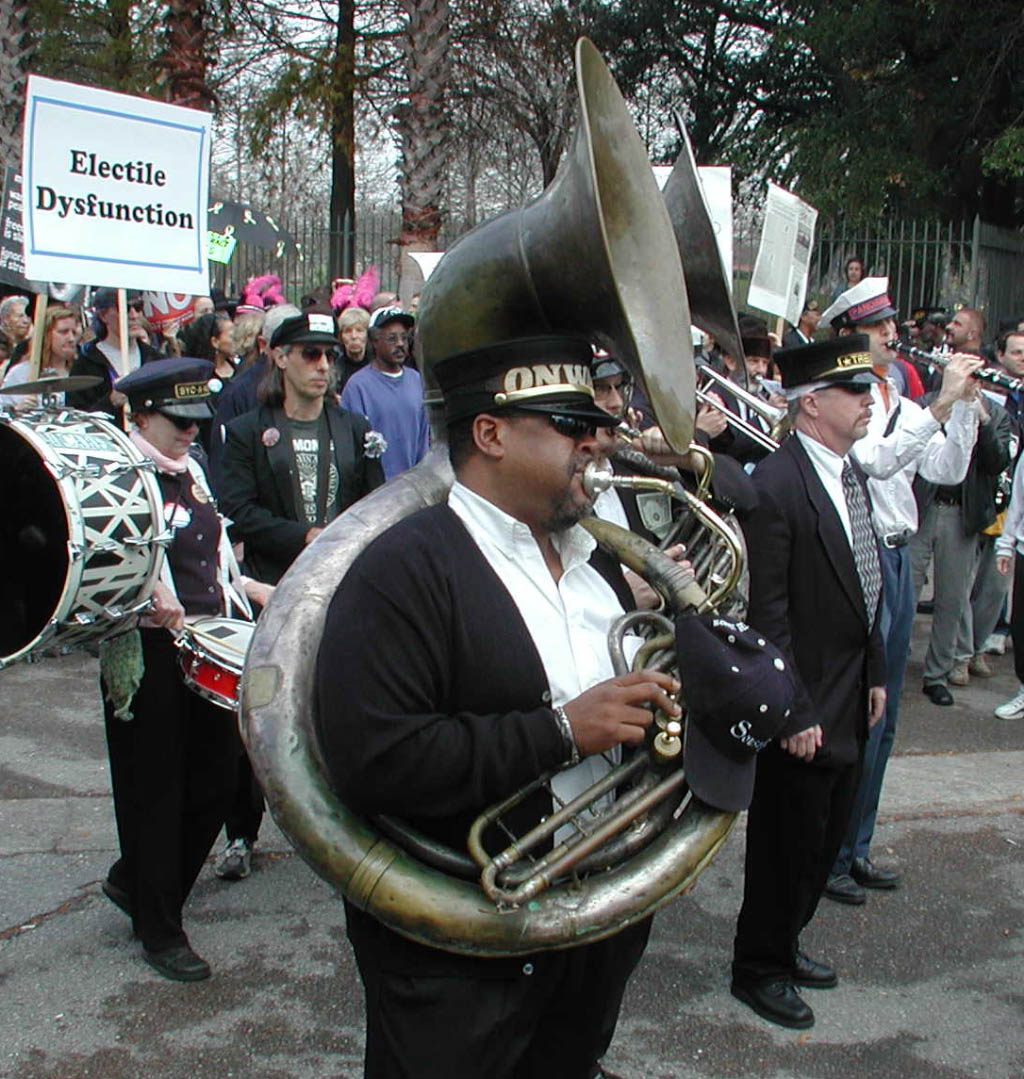
"Jazz Funeral for Democracy" event in New Orleans

The sousaphone is an important fixture of the New Orleans brass band tradition and is still used in groups such as the Dirty Dozen Brass Band by Kirk Joseph. Soul Rebels Brass Band from New Orleans features sousaphone player Edward Lee Jr.

Sinaloa, a state of Mexico, has a type of music called Banda Sinaloense, and the sousaphone is used there as a tuba.

Damon "Tuba Gooding Jr." Bryson from The Roots played the sousaphone on Late Night with Jimmy Fallon. He now does this for The Tonight Show Starring Jimmy Fallon.

Nat Mcintosh is the sousaphone player and co-founder of Youngblood Brass Band, who play a mixture of traditional New Orleans style brass band music and hip hop.

The Lemon Bucket Orkestra, a Canadian self-described "Balkan-Klezmer-Gypsy-Punk-Super-Party-Band", features a sousaphone as one of their instruments.

=== Europe ===
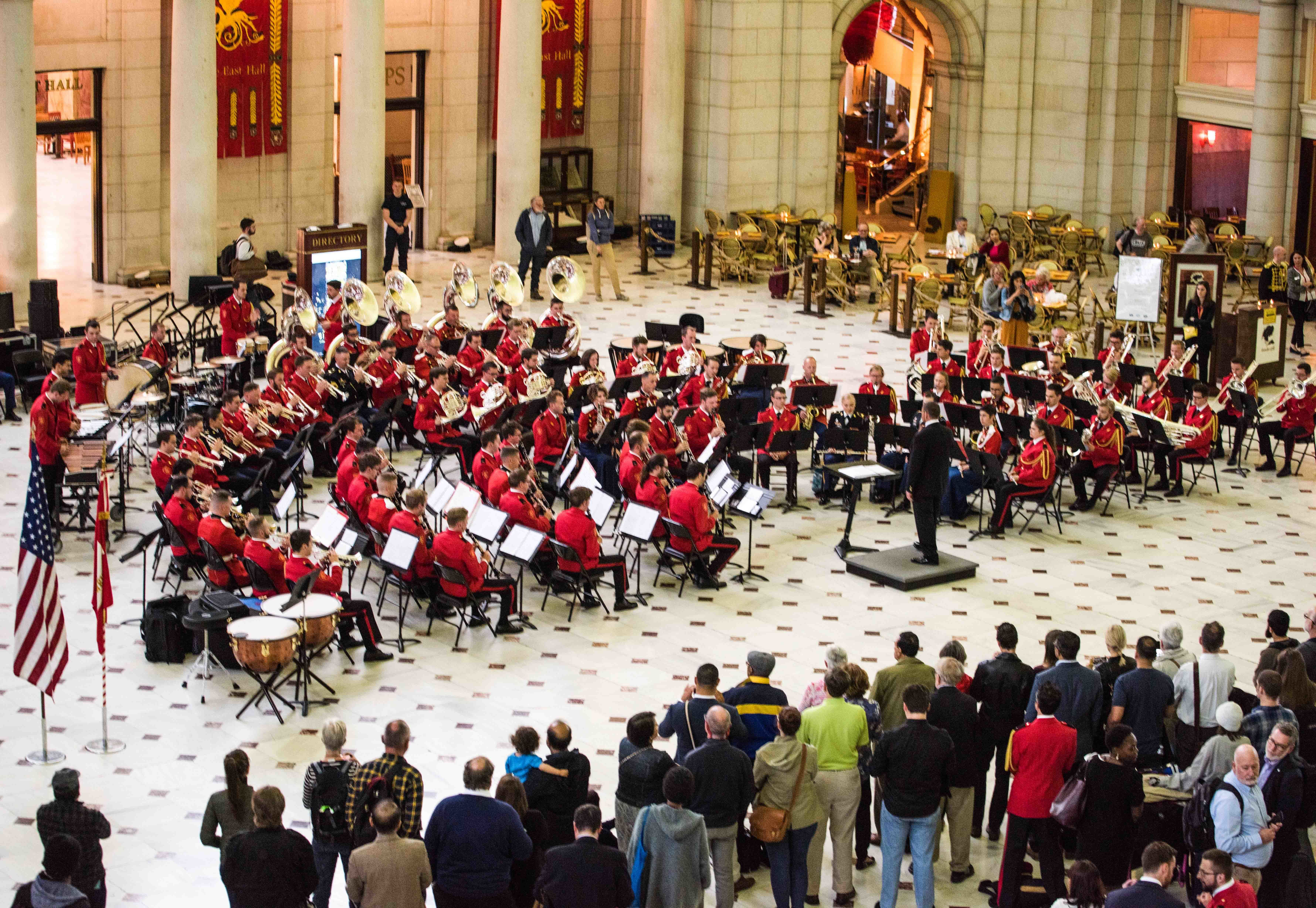
Sousaphones in the Swiss Army Central Band.

Sousaphones are one of the common instruments featured in Swiss bands like the Swiss Army Central Band.

=== Asia ===
Red Baraat, a Brooklyn-based dhol & brass band that fuses North Indian Bhangra with hip-hop, go-go and jazz music, features John Altieri on sousaphone

In Israel there's a growing scene of brass bands that use Sousaphone for the bass function, including acts such as Marsh Dondurma, Las Piratas Piratas and Pam Pah Orkestra.

In Indonesia, Tanjidor is a traditional Betawi musical ensemble developed in Jakarta. This musical ensemble took the form of a modest orchestra and was developed in the 19th century, pioneered by Augustijn Michiels better known as Mayor Jantje, in the Citeureup area (or Citrap) on the outskirts of Batavia.

The instruments used are almost the same as a military band, a military-styled marching band, and/or corps of drums/drum and bugle corps, usually consisting of select wind and percussion instruments. Other than Jakarta, tanjidor musical ensemble is also can be found in Pontianak, West Kalimantan. The sousaphone is one of the instruments.

The sousaphone is one of the instruments played in the Philippines, usually replacing the tuba in concert bands (known as wind orchestras), which usually occur in fiestas.

== In popular culture ==
- In Japan, the series of popular Sound! Euphonium novels (Japanese: 響け! ユーフォニアム; Hibike! Eūfoniamu) about student sousaphone players Takuya Gotou and Riko Nagase, and their high school's concert band has been adapted into manga serials, an anime TV series, and translated into English.

== See also ==
- Cornu (horn), an ancient Roman brass instrument that curved around the player's body
- Saxtuba

== Bibliography ==
- Herbert, Trevor; Myers, Arnold; Wallace, John, eds. (2019). The Cambridge Encyclopedia of Brass Instruments. Cambridge University Press. doi:10.1017/9781316841273. ISBN 978-1-316-63185-0. OL 34730943M. Wikidata Q136027509.
