= The Battalion =

Student newspaper of Texas A&M University

- Type: Student newspaper
- Format: Broadsheet
- School: Texas A&M University
- Publisher: Texas A&M Student Media
- Editor-in-chief: Ava Loth
- Managing editor: Kynlee Bright
- News editor: David Swope
- Campus editor: Adhithi Shankar
- Opinion editor: Wyatt Pickering
- Photo editor: Adriano Espinosa
- Founded: 1893; 133 years ago
- Headquarters: Memorial Student Center, Suite L400, Texas A&M University, College Station, Texas, US
- ISSN: 1055-4726
- Website: www.thebatt.com

The Battalion (The Batt) is the student newspaper of Texas A&M University. Started in 1893 as a monthly publication, it continues to this day, now as a weekly print and daily online paper. The Battalion is entirely student-run and covers the university and surrounding Bryan-College Station area.

== History ==
=== Origins ===
The Agricultural and Mechanical College of Texas (now known as Texas A&M University), had two literary societies, the Calliopean and the Austin. The societies collaboratively published a literary magazine, College Journal from 1889 until 1893. The College Journal appeared monthly, describing the activities of the college and its students in "the flowery prose of the time." College Journal ceased publication in 1893 when the two societies collaborated on a newspaper, called The Battalion.

Vol. 1, No. 1 was published on Sunday, October 1, 1893. In the first issue's salutatory, it reads:

"With this issue The Battalion makes its politest bow to the public and asks its esteemed patronage. As our valued predecessor, The Journal, has enlisted among the ranks of the defunct, we deem it our duty to see that the cadets will yet have a paper to be proud of.

The Editor in Chief here takes advantage of the opportunity offered to thank the societies for the position they have so generously assigned him. He shall do everything in his power to make these pages lively, interesting and instructive, and, with such gifted associate editors to contribute to its columns, he feels that he cannot possibly fall short of his aim.

Boys, this paper is yours. Make it something. Lend all your assigtance [sic] possible. [...] Try this plan, and we will ere long have a paper that can claim its rank high up among the literary editions of every college in the Union!

Again asking the support of the general public, we present you with this, our initial effort, and gracefully yield to your further demands."

— The Battalion, Vol I, No. I

This new publication used a more journalistic style as it covered campus events, and even included photographs; however, early issues still strongly resembled prose, and included sections of poetry, humor and essays.

June editions originally acted as a yearbook before one was officially adopted by the university in 1903. While women weren't allowed to officially attend A&M until 1963, starting in 1893 women could enroll in classes and participate in student organizations. This included The Battalion; Ethel Hudson — the first woman to enroll in A&M courses in 1893 and an honorary member of the Class of 1895 — helped edit the annual yearbook issue. Women have served as reporters, writers and editors of The Battalion throughout its publication

=== Early 1900s ===
In 1904, The Battalion began publishing weekly. Around the same time, the Austin and Calliopean Literary Societies handed publication over to the Association of Students, causing a stylistic shift from literary writing to news coverage.

==== The A&M College Trouble of 1908 ====
While there had been turmoil in years prior about university restrictions, unrest between the students, newspaper and faculty came to a head after University President Henry Hill Harrington ordered history professor Charles W. Hudson and his family — including a popular son and current A&M student — to be confined to their campus home after Hudson's grandchild developed whooping cough. The decision overruled quarantine guidelines from college physician Dr. Joe Gilbert, interpreted as disrespecting Gilbert and questioning his competency. This angered students since Gilbert "had something of a hero image."

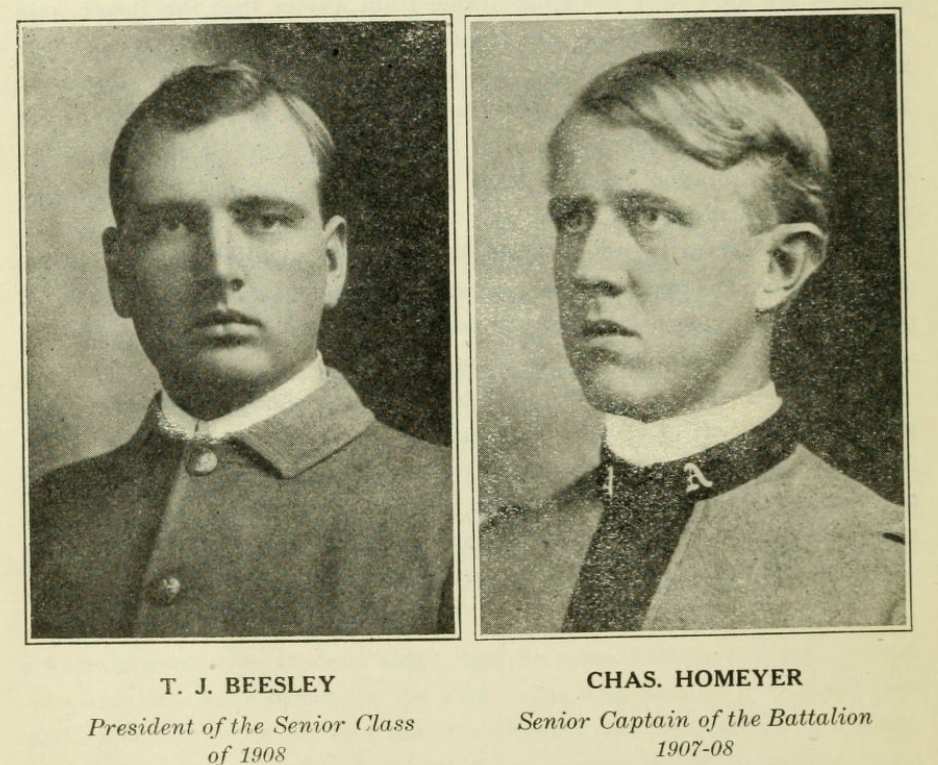
1908 class president T.J. Beesley and newspaper editor Chas. Homeyer, Texas A&M. From the book The history of the A. & M. college trouble, 1908 by The Battalion's local editor Paul D. Casey.

Class president T.J. Beesley and the senior class of 1908 petitioned Texas' governor to remove Harrington from office. A month later, when the board of directors fully exonerated Harrington, roughly half of the student body left campus in protest; the walkout made national headlines at the time.

Students slowly returned to A&M, but two months later The Battalion ran an article disputing Harrington's stance on the protest. He claimed there were no more problems between students and faculty, which the article contested. A&M's board of directors responded by directing Harrington to establish order — seven junior Battalion editors were suspended and an order put in place to censor future publications.

Protest against Harrington continued throughout the summer. As a result, Harrington resigned as university president in August. Censorship rules remained on the books for The Battalion; however, they were almost never enforced and eventually forgotten.

=== World Wars era ===
As the main local source of news at the time, The Battalion broke the news of America declaring war and joining World War I to much of the Bryan-College Station community. The below images are reprinted from The Battalion. Texas A&M was heavily involved in the war effort and had a larger percentage of graduates enlisted than any other university;. in September 1918, the entire senior class enlisted.

Members of the Signal Corps putting up equipment on the drill field.

Morse code training for cadets in 1917.

The Horse Cavalry during a drill in 1917.

Officers of the Corps conducting Sabre Drill on the main drill field.

A 1917 tent pitching practice put on as a corps-wide class by the Military Department.

Retreat formations held on Military Walk before marching into Sbisa Hall for evening dinner in 1917.

The Fightin' Texas Aggie Band of 1917.

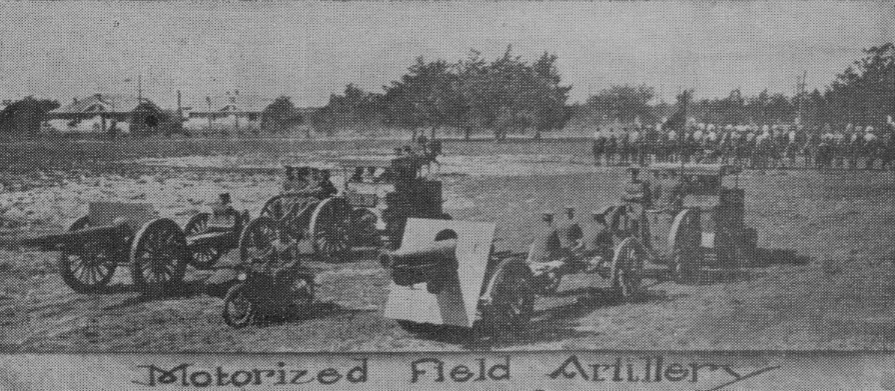
The Battalion's caption reads, "The latest model of military tractors pulled the old howitzers along with the cadets sitting at attention on the cassions."
A collection of headlines and stories describing A&M's involvement in World War I.

Article describing a training camp set up for senior cadets during World War I, about a month after the United States entered the war.

Article covering A&M juniors enrolling in World War I military training in Leon Springs, TX.

Article describes the enlistment of seniors after spring 1917 graduation.

In the 1920s and '30s, the editor-in-chief and business manager were elected annually by the A&M student body. At the same time, The Battalion gained its own campus office.

The only time The Battalion ceased publication was during World War II, when it was suspended for a period of time to conserve paper and supplies.

=== Mid-20th century ===
==== 1954 staff walkout ====
In February 1954, the Student Life committee voted for a special committee to oversee student publication. The entire staff of The Battalion quit in protest the next day. The staff announced the walkout on the paper's front page, saying:

"The Battalion writers and editors quit their jobs last night in protest to a Student Life committee action which they claim will censor the college newspaper.

Ed Holder and Jerry Bennett, co-editors, announced their resignations after the Student Life committee voted to recommend to the Academic Council that a special committee be set up over student publications.

The remainder of the newspaper staff turned in their resignations later."

— Ed Holder and Jerry Bennett, The Battalion

The rest of the four-page issue, in addition to typical news, featured letters to the editor from resigning staff. Each explained their grievances and why they chose to quit.

At the time, The Battalion's walkout made headlines. “Censorship is hidden with advice and assistance,” Holder and Bennett said in a press statement. “To us, it still means the same thing. This committee has been set up to stop The Battalion from printing the truth about things at A&M which are embarrassing to some individuals.”

A new staff was announced one month after the mass resignation, featuring many protesting writers returning in new roles. The two new co-editors, Harri Baker and Bob Boriskie, were formerly the campus and sports editors, respectively; Baker and Boriskie sought Battalion staff approval before taking the positions. Walking out worked as intended and no oversight committee was formed.

==== Push for coeducation ====
"The result [of coeducation]: Strong Corps and Civilian groups to embrace the young women of Texas to make the Spirit of Aggieland grow even stronger."

— Editorial, The Battalion, 1958

In 1958, A&M's student body voted whether or not to implement coeducation at the university. The Battalion began writing editorials to encourage coeducation leading up to the vote. A comic declared coeducation "An evolution, not a revolution."

Copies of The Battalion were burned in the Quad in protest, and Editor-in-Chief Joe Tindel's dorm was "Batt bombed," or filled with crumpled issues of The Batt. A month later, the Student Senate demanded Tindel resign. The coeducation resolution was later defeated by students, and women weren't admitted to A&M until the 1960s.

=== Present ===
In February 2022, Texas A&M University administration unsuccessfully attempted to cease The Battalion weekly print release, despite the organization's independent status. This led to significant backlash from the publication, as featured in their "Print is not dead" edition, and started a student movement, #SaveTheBatt. The publication continues to print weekly, each Thursday, and distributes across Texas A&M's campus and the Bryan-College Station community.

==== Kathleen McElroy hiring controversy ====
On June 13, 2023, former A&M student Kathleen McElroy was hired to lead A&M's new journalism program at an official signing ceremony. She began meeting with journalism faculty and staff of The Battalion soon after to plan for the upcoming year. However, on July 11, Elroy announced she would remain in her position as a University of Texas at Austin professor due to undiscussed changes to her contract.

"We thought it couldn’t get any worse. At first, it was frightening to be a student in such a period of instability within our communication and journalism department. Now, it’s evolved into a system-wide fallout that’s garnered national attention, which has been nothing but an embarrassment to our university."

— Editorial, The Battalion, 2023

Two days after McElroy's official hiring, Texas Scorecard published "Aggies Hire NY Times 'Diversity' Advocate to Head Journalism Program." The article was written by a former opinion writer for The Battalion and discussed McElroy's work in diversity, equity and inclusion. Its publication led to criticism of her hiring, and on July 6, the Texas A&M Board of Regents met to discuss the decision.

On July 7, McElroy said she spoke on the phone with José Luis Bermúdez, then-interim dean of the College of Arts and Sciences, and that he advised her to stay at UT, saying her hiring "stirred up a hornet's nest." Bermúdez later resigned from the position, citing the controversy.

On July 9, McElroy received a one-year contract that varied from the original agreement and included a clause about "at-will termination." She was originally offered tenure, which then-University President M. Katherine Banks told the faculty senate was still on the table on July 19. Banks resigned as university president on July 21 as a result of the McElroy controversy.

== Traditions ==
- Silver Taps - when a student passes away, they're honored by a Silver Taps ceremony; the week of the ceremony, a write-up of the student's life and who they were, typically with quotes from their friends and family, appears in that week's print edition of The Battalion
- BTHO papers - for major sporting events, The Battalion publishes a BTHO, or "beat the hell outta," poster, featuring the phrase "BTHO [opponent]" that spectators hold up during the game
- Batt bombing - typically done to freshmen by upperclassmen in the Corps of Cadets, Batt bombing involves filling a cadet's dorm room with crumpled up copies of The Battalion, with the goal being to take up as much of the room as possible
- Swan Songs - graduating Battalion staff have the option of writing a Swan Song column, which reflects on their time at A&M
- Ring Day columns - similar to Swan Songs, Ring Day columns are written when a staff member earns their Aggie Ring

== Distribution ==
The Battalion is published in print on Thursdays during the fall and spring semesters, and online daily throughout the year. The print version is distributed throughout the Texas A&M campus to interested students, faculty and staff. Many places throughout College Station, such as restaurants and apartments, receive copies to distribute to their customers.

A&M's Cushing Memorial Library keeps an incomplete archive of past Battalion print issues, starting with the first issue from October 1893. The Battalion's page on Issuu has a print archive going back to 2009.

== Honors ==
Princeton Review named The Battalion as the twentieth best college newspaper in the nation in its 2008 edition of The Best 361 Colleges. Along with four other university newspapers, The Battalion received honorable mention in the 2004 National College Newspaper Convention held by the Associated Collegiate Press. In October 2022, The Battalion was recorded as having an average of 116 shares per article and was ranked 8th in the U.S. for most consistent engagement per article.

National Pacemaker Awards (past 30 years)

- 1996 Pacemakers - finalist
- 1997 Pacemakers - finalist
- 2008 Pacemakers - winner
- 2012 Pacemakers - finalist
- 2019 Pacemakers - winner
- 2021 Pacemakers - finalist
- 2022 Pacemakers - winner
- 2023 Pacemakers - finalist
- 2024 Pacemakers - finalist

== Aggieland yearbook ==
The Battalion has been involved with production of Texas A&M's yearbook since its creation. Originally, the June issue of The Battalion served as an unofficial yearbook. In 1895, the Olio became the first separate production, printed after a series of Battalion editorials arguing for a college annual to be created. The next yearbook wasn't printed until 1903, under the name the Longhorn. This has no affiliation with Texas A&M's rival school University of Texas-Austin or their mascot the Longhorns, since UT didn't adopt longhorn cattle as its mascot until 1916.

The Longhorn published each year from 1903 to 1948, except for 1943 to 1945 when World War II interrupted publication. In 1949, students voted to change the name to Aggieland, which the yearbook has used until present.

The 2000 edition of Aggieland was named an ACP Pacemaker finalist for its coverage of the 1999 Aggie Bonfire collapse. In 2004, 2007, 2014, 2015 and 2018, it was listed as a finalist as well. Aggieland won the 2008 and 2013 Yearbook Pacemakers.

Aggieland's office is located at the front of The Battalion's office in the Memorial Student Center. Both productions fall under Student Media in the Texas A&M Division of Student Affairs. Aggieland's current editor-in-chief is Emily Escobedo.

== Notable alumni ==
Ernest Lynwood Bruce (1876-1949) was the first Editor in Chief of The Battalion in fall 1893. He graduated with a degree in civil engineering in 1894, then attended the University of Texas School of Law and became a prominent attorney in Orange, Texas. From 1913 to 1917 Bruce represented Texas' 14th District — then covering Jefferson, Liberty and Orange Counties — as a Democratic state legislator.

Singer-songwriter and actor Lyle Lovett wrote for The Battalion as a journalism student in the late 1970s. Lovett has won four Grammy Awards, including Best Male Country Vocal Performance and Best Country Album.

Journalist Cathie Anderson served as The Battalion's first Black editor-in-chief in 1986. She is currently a reporter for The Sacramento Bee and previously worked for the Dallas Morning News, Detroit News and Austin American-Statesman. In 2024, the Former Journalism Students Association of Texas A&M inducted Anderson into its Hall of Fame. A plaque of Anderson hangs in the newsroom of The Battalion.

== See also ==
- List of student newspapers in the United States of America
- List of student newspapers
