= Mary and Sophie Hutson =

American civil engineers

Twin sisters Mary Lockett Hutson Nelson (1884–1982) and Sophie Palmer Hutson Rollins (1884–1983) were the first women to complete the civil engineering program (in 1903) at the Agricultural and Mechanical College of Texas (now Texas A&M University) in College Station, Texas. However, their official degrees were awarded posthumously because, before 1963, the school’s charter made no provision for female students.

== Biographies ==
The twins began their studies in 1899, at the age of 15. At that time, the school's charter was for an all-male military school (as it would remain until 1963), but the sisters were allowed to attend because their father, Charles Woodward Hutson, was an English and history professor. In those years, daughters of faculty members were allowed to attend classes because there were no local schools for women. The sisters were called the "campus twins," and attended the same classes and took the same exams as the cadets.

Their schoolmates in the Class of 1900 “as a sign of acceptance and respect“ gave the sisters cadet jackets which they proudly wore. Their mother altered the jackets to fit the girls, and she made matching skirts as well. After finishing the coursework for their four-year civil engineering program in 1903, the women received certificates of completion signed by faculty members, but could not receive actual diplomas.

Despite her lack of a college degree, Mary worked for A. M. Lockett Co., a New Orleans engineering firm and designed water pumping facilities in New Orleans, Mississippi and Texas. She married a fellow engineer from New Orleans, Bernard Stanley Nelson, in the summer of 1913. Two years later, they moved into a house designed by Mary, which survived two hurricanes with minimal damage. They had five children. She died in 1982 at the age of 98.

Sophie married fellow Aggie Henry Martin Rollins in 1905 had eight children. She died in 1983 at 99.

The twins' degrees were awarded posthumously in 2002, ninety-nine years after they completed the program, at a campus event commemorating A&M's 125th year.
