= Texas A&M University =

Public land-grant university in College Station, Texas, US

- Former names: State Agricultural and Mechanical College of Texas (1871–1887) (Note: The school was first given this name in 1871 (the year the Texas Legislature appropriated funds to begin A&M's construction), but did not open for instruction until 1876 The institution ceased using the word "State" around 1887. It was known as the Agricultural and Mechanical College of Texas until it became Texas A&M University in 1963.) Agricultural and Mechanical College of Texas (1887–1963)
- Type: Public land-grant research senior military university
- Established: 1876; 150 years ago (Note: The seal contains the date 1876, the year in which Texas A&M began classes. Both 1871 (the year the Texas Legislature appropriated funds to begin A&M's construction) and 1876 can be considered the dates of establishment depending on the context of the usage.)
- Parent institution: Texas A&M University System
- Accreditation: SACS
- Academic affiliations: AAU; ORAU; URA; sea-grant; space-grant
- Endowment: $19.11 billion (FY2024) (Texas A&M only) $20.38 billion (FY2024) (system-wide)
- President: Susan Ballabina
- Provost: Jerry R. Strawser (interim)
- Faculty: 4,300 (fall 2024)
- Total staff: 11,114 (fall 2024)
- Students: 79,114 (fall 2024) • 71,045 (College Station) • 2,138 (Galveston) • 1,751 (Fort Worth) • 430 (McAllen) • 3,750 (Health Science Center)
- Undergraduates: 61,442 (fall 2024)
- Postgraduates: 12,140 (fall 2024)
- Doctoral students: 5,439 (fall 2024)
- Location: College Station, Texas, United States (Note: The institution's branch campuses, Texas A&M University at Galveston and Texas A&M University at Qatar, are considered part of Texas A&M's Main Campus. These branches are located in Galveston, Texas and in Education City, Al Rayyan, Qatar respectively.); 30.61°N 96.35°W
- Campus: 5,500 acres (2,230 ha); Midsize city
- Other campuses: Bryan; Canyon; Dallas; Fort Worth; Galveston; Houston; Kingsville; McAllen; Round Rock; Al Rayyan
- Newspaper: The Battalion
- Colors: Maroon and white
- Nicknames: Texas Aggies; Aggies
- Sporting affiliations: NCAA Division I FBS – SEC
- Mascot: Reveille X
- Website: tamu.edu

Texas A&M University (Texas A&M, A&M, TA&M, or TAMU) is a public land-grant research university in College Station, Texas, United States. It was founded in 1876 and became the flagship institution of the Texas A&M University System in 1948. Since 2021, Texas A&M has enrolled the largest student body in the United States. It is classified among "R1: Doctoral Universities – Very high research activity" and since 2001 has been a member of the Association of American Universities.

The university was the first public higher education institution in Texas; it opened for classes on October 4, 1876, as the Agricultural and Mechanical College of Texas (A.M.C.) under the provisions of the 1862 Morrill Land-Grant Act. In the following decades, the college grew in size and scope, expanding to its largest enrollment during WWII before its first significant stagnation in enrollment post-war. Enrollment grew again in the 1960s under the leadership of President James Earl Rudder, during whose tenure the college desegregated, became coeducational, and ended the requirement for participation in the Corps of Cadets. In 1963, to reflect the institution's expanded roles and academic offerings, the Texas Legislature renamed the college Texas A&M University; the letters "A&M" were retained as a tribute to the university's former designation.

The university's main campus spans over 5,500 acres (22 km^{2}) and includes the George H. W. Bush Presidential Library and Museum. The university offers degrees in more than 130 courses of study through 18 colleges and houses 21 research institutes. As a senior military college, Texas A&M is one of six American universities classed as such and has a full-time, volunteer Cadet Corps whose members study alongside civilian undergraduate students. About one-fifth of the student body lives on campus. Texas A&M has more than 1,000 officially recognized student organizations. The university's students, alumni, and sports teams are known as Aggies. Its athletes compete in eighteen varsity sports as a member of the Southeastern Conference.

== History ==
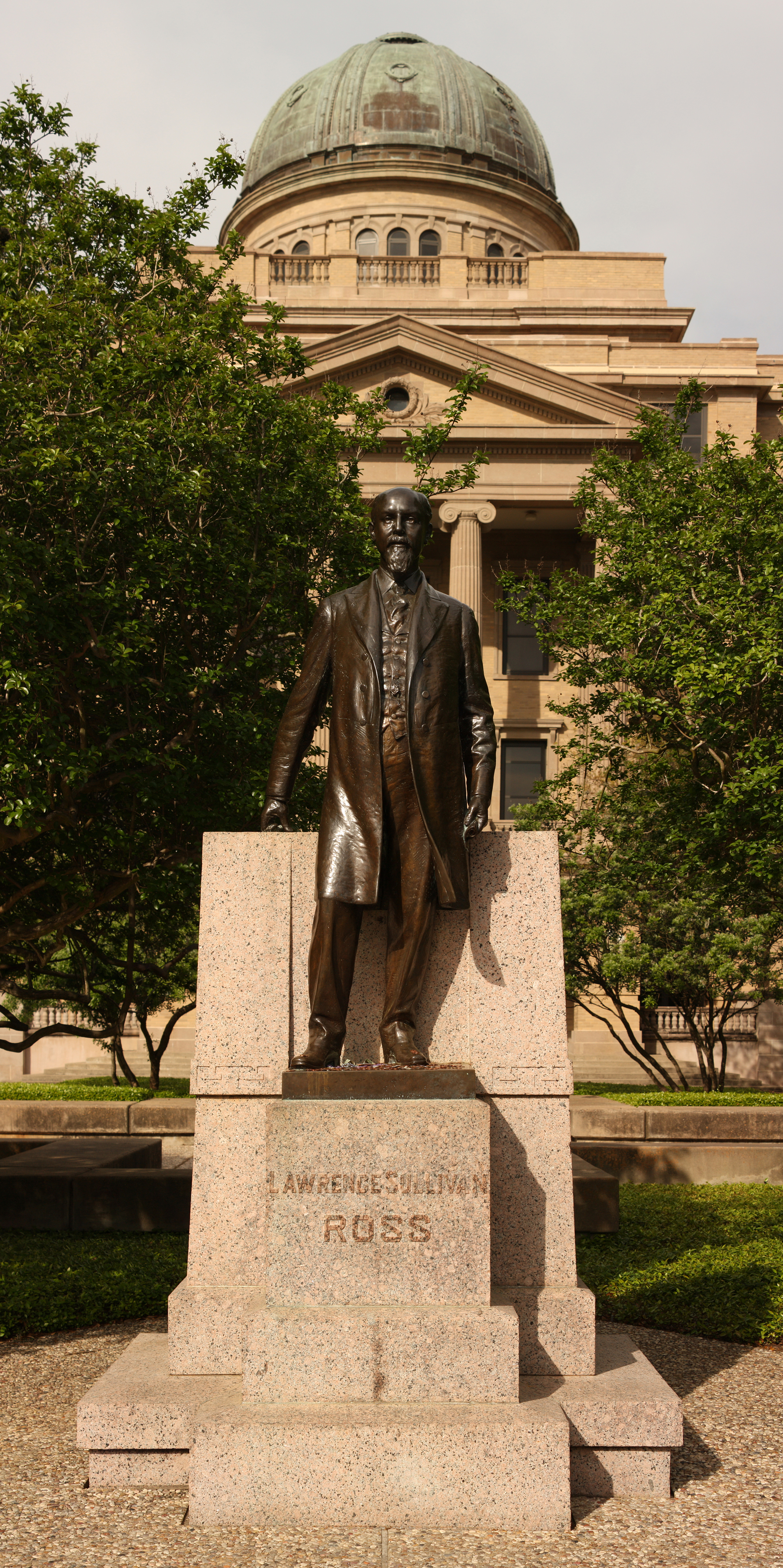
Statue of Lawrence Sullivan "Sul" Ross located in front of the Academic Building

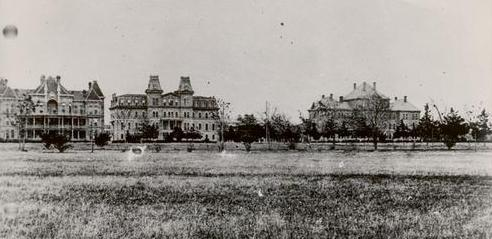
Texas A&M in 1902

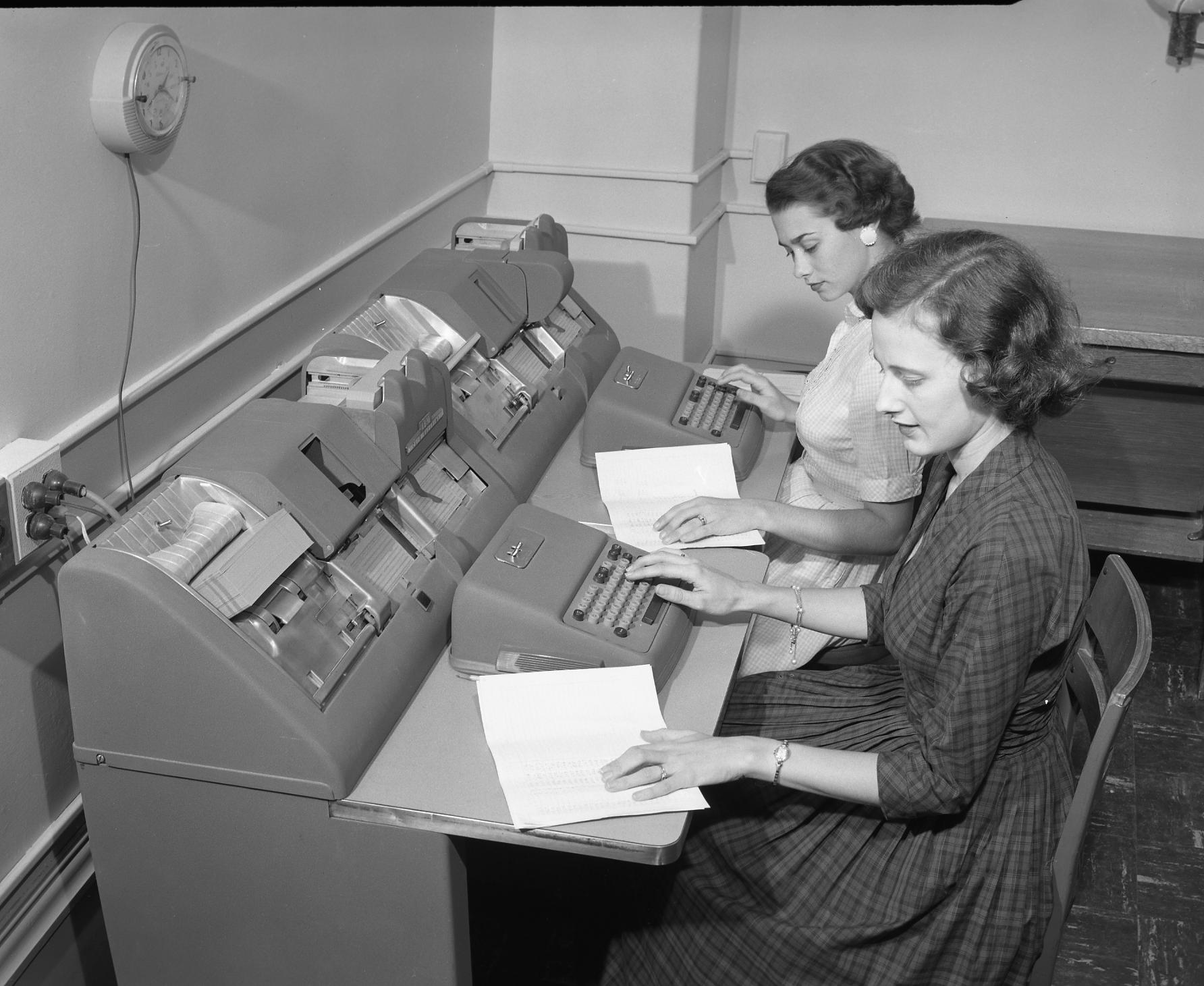
Staff at Texas A&M entering data for punch cards for new computers in the 1950s

=== Early years ===
In 1862, the U.S. Congress passed the Morrill Act, which auctioned land grants of public lands to establish endowments for colleges at which the "leading object shall be, without excluding other scientific and classical studies and including military tactics, to teach such branches of learning as are related to agriculture and mechanical arts ... to promote the liberal and practical education of the industrial classes in the several pursuits and professions in life". In 1871, the Texas Legislature used these funds to establish the state's first public institution of higher education, the Agricultural and Mechanical College of Texas, (Texas A.M.C.). Brazos County donated 2,416 acres (10 km^{2}) near Bryan, Texas, for the college's campus. From its beginning until the late 1920s, students were officially nicknamed "Farmers" but the moniker "Aggies"—a common nickname for students at schools focused heavily on agriculture—gained favor and became the official student-body nickname in 1949.

The first day of classes was set for October 2, 1876, but only six students enrolled on the first day. Classes were delayed and officially began on October 4 with six faculty members and forty students at the military school. During the first semester, enrollment increased to 48 students and by the end of the 1877 spring semester, 106 students had enrolled. Admission was limited to white males, who were required to participate in the Corps of Cadets and receive military training. Originally, the college taught no classes in agriculture or engineering, instead concentrating on classical studies, languages, literature, and applied mathematics. After initial resistance from faculty, the college began to focus on degrees in scientific agriculture, and civil and mechanical engineering. In 1881, enrollment grew to 258 but declined to 108 in 1883, the same year the University of Texas opened in Austin. Although originally envisioned and annotated in the Texas Constitution as a branch of the soon-to-begin University of Texas, Texas A.M.C. had a separate Board of Directors from the University of Texas and was never incorporated into the University of Texas System.

In the late 1880s, many Texas residents saw no need for two colleges in Texas and advocated for the elimination of Texas A.M.C. In 1891, the college was saved from closure by its new president Lawrence Sullivan Ross, former Governor of Texas and former Confederate Brigadier General, by demonstrating the college could function and excel in its established form under proper leadership. Ross made many improvements to the campus, installing running water and permanent dormitories. Enrollment doubled under his tenure to 467 cadets as parents sent their sons to Texas A.M.C. to emulate the traits of Ross. Many college traditions began under Ross's presidency, including the creation of the first Aggie Ring, the senior class ring. Ross served until his death in 1898; to honor his contributions to the college, a statue of him was erected in 1918 in front of modern-day Academic Plaza.

Initially, women were permitted to attend classes only as "special students" but were not permitted to seek degrees. In 1893, Ethel Hudson, a daughter of one of the faculty, became the first woman to take classes; in 1899, her sisters Sophie and Mary Hudson did the same. Though not explicitly envisioned as such, over time it became a de facto all-male institution and led to a decades-long debate about the role of women at the college. In 1911, under pressure from the Texas Legislature, the college allowed women to attend classes during the summer semester. A.M.C. expanded its academic offerings with the establishment of the School of Veterinary Medicine in 1915.

=== World Wars era ===
Many Texas A&M alumni served during World War I and by 1918, 49% of all Aggies were in military service, a higher proportion than that of any other American college or university. In early September 1918, the entire senior class enlisted, and there were plans to send the younger students at staggered dates throughout the next year. Many of the seniors were fighting in France when the war ended two months later. More than 1,200 alumni served as commissioned officers. After the war, Texas A&M grew rapidly and became nationally recognized for its programs in agriculture, engineering, and military science. The first graduate school was organized in 1924 and the school awarded its first PhD in 1940. In 1925, Mary Evelyn Crawford Locke became the first female student to receive a diploma from Texas A&M but she was not allowed to participate in the graduation ceremony. The following month, the Board of Directors officially prohibited all women from enrolling.

Many Texas A&M alumni served in the military during World War II; the college's educational and technical training resulted in 20,229 trained combat troops for U.S. military efforts. Of those, 14,123 alumni served as officers, more than any other school, and more than the combined total of the United States Naval Academy and the United States Military Academy. At the start of World War II, Texas A&M was selected as one of six engineering colleges to participate in the Electronics Training Program, which would train Navy personnel to maintain new radar systems. During the war, 29 Texas A&M graduates reached the rank of general.

After the end of World War II, enrollment rapidly grew as many former soldiers used the G.I. Bill to fund their education; however, enrollment stagnated during the following decade.

=== University era ===
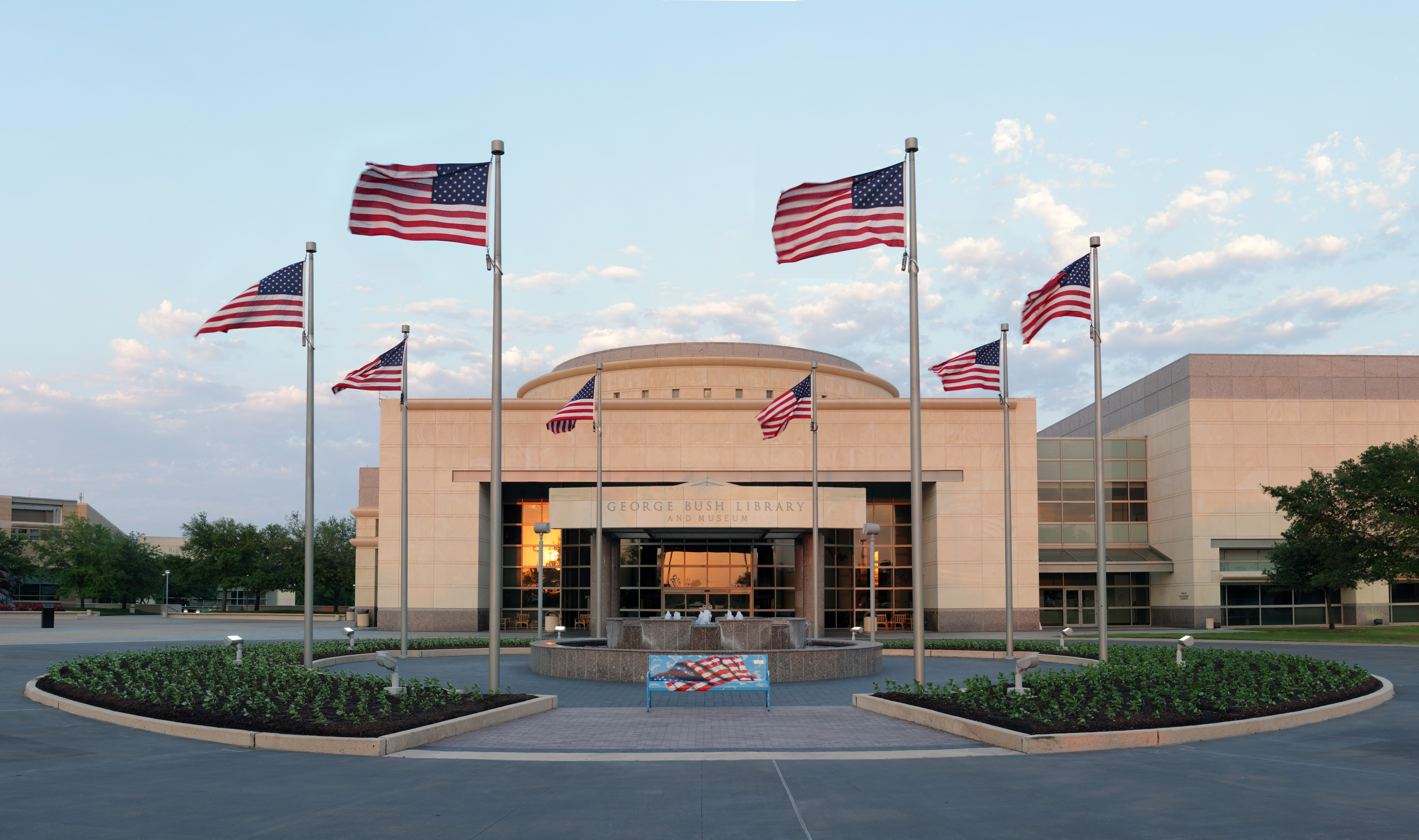
George H.W. Bush Presidential Library and Museum

In 1948, the state legislature established the Texas A&M College Station campus as the flagship of a new system of universities, the Texas A&M University System. Its goal was to serve as the lead institution to foster the evolution of a statewide educational, research and service system.

On July 1, 1959, Major General James Earl Rudder, class of 1932, became the 16th president of the college. In 1963, with the backing of State Senator William T. "Bill" Moore, the 58th Legislature of Texas approved Rudder's proposal for a substantial expansion of the college. Over the coming years, Texas A&M augmented and upgraded its physical plant and facilities, and diversified and expanded its student body by admitting women and minorities. Membership in the Corps of Cadets also became voluntary from the start of the fall semester of 1963. Initially, the decision to admit women made the student body very unhappy. The change was initially resisted and some minor efforts to reverse it persisted for several decades. The positive impact of these changes was rapid. By 1972, on-campus housing was dedicated for women and in 1976, the student body elected its first Black student-body president. In the same series of actions, the Texas legislature officially renamed the school "Texas A&M University", specifying the symbolic nature of the letters "A" and "M", which reflect the institution's past, and no longer denote "Agricultural and Mechanical".

By the time of his death in 1970, Rudder had overseen the growth of the college from 7,500 to 14,000 students from all 50 U.S. states and from 75 other nations. In the 35 years following his death, Texas A&M more than tripled its enrollment from 14,000 students to more than 45,000.

Texas A&M became one of the first four universities given the designation sea-grant for its achievements in oceanography and marine resources development in 1971. In 1989, the university earned the title space-grant from the National Aeronautics and Space Administration (NASA) to recognize its commitment to space research and participation in the Texas Space Grant Consortium. In 1997, the university opened the Bush School of Government and Public Service and the George H.W. Bush Presidential Library and Museum—one of fifteen American presidential libraries operated by the National Archives and Records Administration. Former U.S. President George H. W. Bush remained actively involved with the university, frequently visiting the campus and participating in special events until his death in 2018. He was buried on campus.

=== 21st century ===
With strong support from Rice University and the University of Texas, the Association of American Universities inducted Texas A&M in May 2001. On July 12, 2013, Texas A&M Health Science Center was formally merged into the university. On August 12, 2013, the university acquired the Texas Wesleyan University School of Law and renamed it the Texas A&M University School of Law.

In 2017, the retention of the statue of Lawrence Sullivan "Sul" Ross was in question after other institutions removed statues of former Confederate officers. The Texas A&M University System Chancellor, John Sharp, and President, Michael Young, announced the statue would remain on campus because it is not based upon his service in the Confederate Army. Amid the nationwide Black Lives Matter riots, attempts in 2020 by a group of students and activists to secure its removal were rebuffed by the university's administration, other students and alumni, and counter-protestors. The university also confirmed that the removal of the statue would require approval from the Texas Legislature.

In 2022, university president M. Katherine Banks implemented university-wide administrative restructuring that involved several changes to academic unit names and branding. The College of Science, the College of Geosciences, and the College of Liberal Arts, were merged to form the Texas A&M University College of Arts & Sciences. Several academic units underwent a change in name including the Texas A&M University Irma Lerma Rangel School of Pharmacy. The following year, Banks abruptly resigned in July after her role in the failed attempt to hire Kathleen McElroy via unauthorized means and subsequent cover-up. McElroy's potential hiring was heavily criticized by conservative groups and alumni due to her work on race and gender in newsrooms. After Banks resigned, Mark A. Welsh III, the dean of the Bush School of Government and Public Service, was appointed interim president and became the university's president later that year.

==== Trump administration ====
In September 2025, the university removed an English professor, Melissa McCoul, following a lecture teaching about transgender people that was in contravention to Trump administration policy on what it termed "gender ideology". A student confronted McCoul during the lecture and was asked to leave the class. The student, who has not been identified publicly, was seen on video telling McCoul that a lesson about gender identity and sexuality was against her religion. The lecture resulted in the university receiving threats from both the State of Texas and the federal government after word was spread via Libs of TikTok. McCoul filed a lawsuit in February 2026, seeking reinstatement and damages.

Following this, University President Mark A. Welsh III resigned. Hundreds of books were found discarded in a university warehouse, including LGBT-related books. The "Surplus Property Office acknowledged that the box of books was from its warehouse but refuted the ... claim that the box was full of LGBTQ+ related books. The office said only that the books were 'not for recirculation'." James Hallmark, the system's vice chancellor for academic affairs, wrote "that Dr. McCoul's dismissal was based upon good cause" despite a faculty panel ruling unanimously that the university was not justified.

In November 2025, the "University System Board of Regents unanimously approved policy revisions" which say:

No system academic course will advocate race or gender ideology, or topics related to sexual orientation or gender identity. Upon prior written approval of the member CEO after review of the course and relevant course materials, specific non-core curriculum or graduate courses in some disciplines may teach race or gender ideology, or topics related to sexual orientation or gender identity. Such approval may be granted in limited circumstances upon demonstration of a necessary educational purpose.

In January 2026, the university announced plans to eliminate women's and gender studies degree programs, a class in which sexual orientation was to be discussed was canceled, and a philosophy professor who had included portions of Symposium (Plato) in his syllabus. The professor had previously assigned an excerpt from the supreme court opinion Obergefell v. Hodges. Kristi Sweet emailed:

The college leadership team and I have discussed your syllabus and the Provost office's requirements for compliance with the new system rule 08.01. You have two options going forward:

1. You may mitigate your course content to remove the modules on race ideology and gender ideology, and the Plato readings that may include these.
2. You may be reassigned

== Campuses ==
=== College Station campus ===
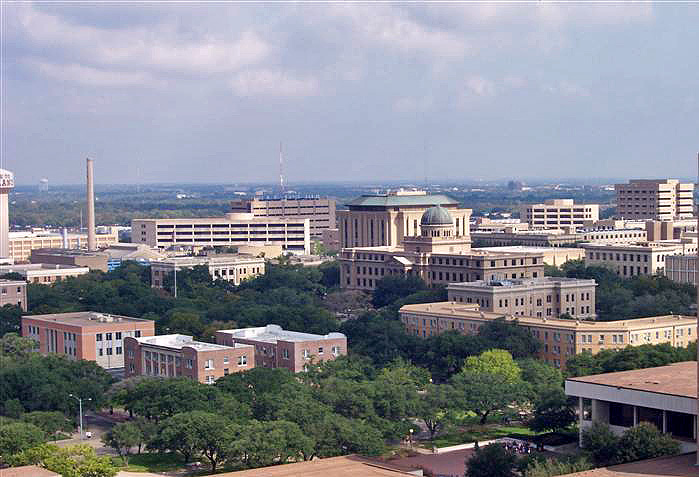
A view of the main campus, looking north from Kyle Field. At the center is the Academic Building with its copper dome.

Texas A&M's College Station campus spans 5,200 acres (21 km^{2}) and Research Park covers an additional 350 acres (1 km^{2}). The university is part of the Bryan-College Station metropolitan area of Brazos County, which is located in the Brazos Valley (Southeast Central Texas) region, an area often referred to as "Aggieland". Brazos Valley is centrally located within 200 miles (320 km) of three of the ten largest cities in the U.S. and 75% of the population of Texas and Louisiana—approximately 13 million people. The area's major roadway is State Highway 6, and several smaller state highways and Farm to Market Roads connect the area to larger highways such as Interstate 45.

The College Station campus is bisected by a railroad track operated by Union Pacific. The area east of the tracks, known as main campus, includes buildings for the colleges of engineering, architecture, geosciences, science, education, and liberal arts. Dormitories, the main dining centers, and many campus support facilities are also on the main campus. Notable buildings on the main campus include Kyle Field, Sterling C. Evans Library, the Academic Building, Harrington Hall, the Memorial Student Center, the Administration Building, Rudder Tower, Albritton Bell Tower, and the Bonfire Memorial. To the west of the railroad tracks lies West Campus, which includes most of the sports facilities, the business school, agricultural programs, life sciences, the veterinary college, the political science and economics school, George Bush School of Government & Public Service, George Bush Presidential Library, and two schools within the Texas A&M Health Science Center.

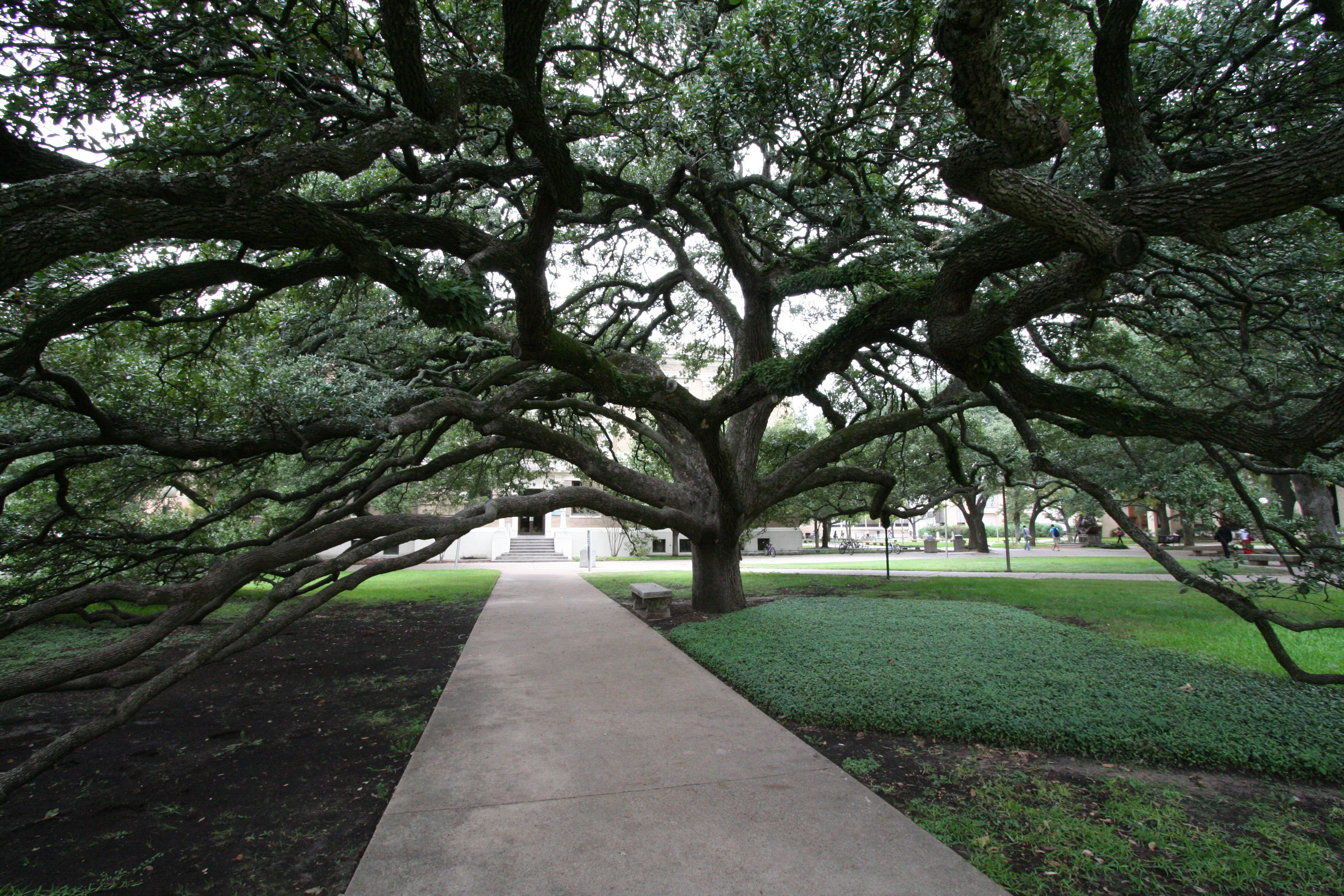
The Century Tree, a campus landmark and subject to several traditions

=== Branch campuses ===
Besides the College Station main campus, the university formally includes three branch campuses:

- Texas A&M University at Galveston is dedicated to marine research and hosts the Texas A&M Maritime Academy;
- Texas A&M University Higher Education Center at McAllen is dedicated to engineering, biomedical science, public health, and food systems industry management; and
- Texas A&M University at Qatar (TAMUQ) in Education City, Al Rayyan, Qatar, is dedicated to engineering disciplines.

Texas A&M Health maintains several other Health Science Centers and campuses away from the Bryan-College Station campus. The School of Engineering Medicine (EnMed), at the Houston Methodist Hospital, and the Texas A&M Institute of Biosciences and Technology, are both located in the Texas Medical Center in Houston. The School of Dentistry is located in Dallas, and the institution has a presence in Corpus Christi, Kingsville, Lufkin, McAllen, Round Rock, and Temple.

Texas A&M School of Law, formerly Texas Wesleyan University School of Law, is located in Fort Worth. Texas A&M maintains the RELLIS Campus, formerly the Texas A&M University-Riverside Campus and Bryan Air Force Base, which was transferred from the university to become a separate entity within the Texas A&M University System in September 2015.

== Academics ==
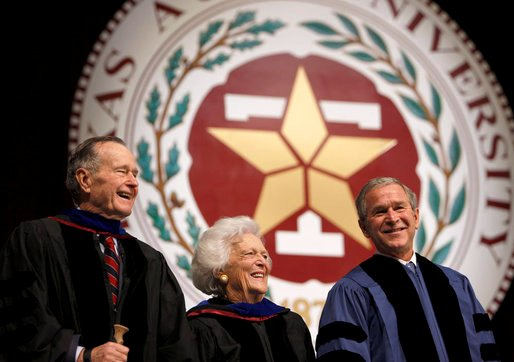
Then-President George W. Bush with parents, former President George H. W. Bush and former First Lady Barbara Bush at Texas A&M's December 2008 convocation

=== Administration and organization ===
Texas A&M is part of the Texas A&M University System, which consists of 12 universities, eight state agencies, and the RELLIS Campus. The system is governed by a ten-member Board of Regents, nine of whom are appointed by the Governor of Texas to six-year terms, and one non-voting Student Regent who is appointed to a one-year term. The Chancellor of the Texas A&M University System is responsible for day-to-day operations and is answerable to the Board of Regents.

The university is led by the university president, who has executive responsibility, and is selected by and reports to the chancellor. The provost is responsible for all educational and service activities of the university, and reports to the president. The cabinet, as the institution's administrative arm, and the deans of the respective colleges, also report to the president. The university and colleges are accredited by the Southern Association of Colleges and Schools and associated professional organizations offering degrees in 130 courses of study, over 260 professional and graduate degrees via its 17 colleges, and further opportunities in 21 research centers and institutes.

==== Colleges and schools ====
- College of Agriculture and Life Sciences
- College of Architecture
- College of Arts and Sciences
- Mays Business School
- College of Dentistry
- College of Education and Human Development
- College of Engineering
- School of Engineering Medicine
- Bush School of Government and Public Service
- School of Law
- College of Marine Sciences and Maritime Studies
- Naresh K. Vashisht College of Medicine
- College of Nursing
- College of Performance, Visualization and Fine Arts
- Irma Lerma Rangel College of Pharmacy
- School of Public Health
- College of Veterinary Medicine and Biomedical Sciences

=== Student body ===
Undergraduate admissions statistics
- 2024 entering class
- Admit rate: 54.2% (▼ −5.4)
- Yield rate: 46.2% (▼ −3.3)

Test scores middle 50%^{[i]}
- SAT EBRW: 587–682 (▼ −5 median)
- SAT Math: 574–701 (▼ −10 median)
- ACT Composite: 26–32 ( same median)

High school GPA^{[ii]}
- Top 10%: 66.57% ( +0.73)
- Top 25%: 91.4% ( −0.13)
- Top 50%: 99.01% ( +0.05)

As of the fall semester in 2021, Texas A&M was the largest American university with an enrollment of 72,982 students who were pursuing degrees in 17 academic colleges. The student body originates from all 50 U.S. states and over 120 other countries. Texas residents account for 86.27% of the student population and 7.42% are of international origin. The demographics of the student body are 52.9% male and 47.1% female. Members of ethnic minority groups make up 42.2% of the student population. (Note: 22.4% Hispanic, 8.8% Asian, 7.2% international, 3.4% Black, 0.2% Native American, 0.1% Native Hawaiian, and 3.4% undetermined.) According to U.S. News & World Report, Texas A&M has a student-to-teacher ratio of 19:1 and an average-freshman-retention rate of 92%. According to the institution, in 2019, it had a four-year-graduation rate of 59% and a six-year-graduation of 81.7%. College of Engineering had the largest enrollment of 29.6%. The College of Liberal Arts and the College of Agriculture and Life Sciences followed, enrolling 12% and 11% of the student body, respectively. The School of Education and Human Development and Mays Business School each enrolled 9%. The remaining schools enrolled less than 6% each. In addition, slightly more than 3% of the student body had not declared a major.

As of 2019, the university enrolled the seventh-highest total of National Merit scholars in the United States and the third-highest among all public universities. As of 2021, about 72% of the student body receives about $810 million in financial aid annually. The admission rate of students who applied as undergraduates in 2020 was 63%. The school is rated as "more selective" by U.S. News & World Report.

=== Rankings ===
Academic rankings

National
- Forbes: 61
- U.S. News & World Report: 51 (tie)
- Washington Monthly: 193
- WSJ/College Pulse: 33

Global
- ARWU: 201–300
- QS: 144
- THE: 151 (tie)
- U.S. News & World Report: 187 (tie)

In a comparison of educational quality, faculty quality, and research output, the Center for World-Class Universities placed Texas A&M 57th nationally and 151st internationally in its 2021 Academic Ranking of World Universities (ARWU) rankings. In its 2021–2022 rankings, The Times Higher Education Supplement listed Texas A&M 61st among North America's universities and 193rd among world universities. The 2021–2022 QS World University Rankings placed the university 168th in the world. In its 2022 edition, the Center for World University Rankings placed Texas A&M as the 74th-best university globally and 41st nationally. In the 2022 edition of the U.S. News & World Report ranking of universities, Texas A&M was placed 68th nationally and 130th globally.

In 2021, The Washington Monthly assessed Texas A&M 21st nationally based on their criteria, which weigh research, community service, and social mobility. In 2021, Forbes rated Texas A&M as the 17th-best public university in the country and 50th overall. After conducting a survey of leading employment recruiters, The Wall Street Journal ranked Texas A&M second nationally as "most likely to help students land a job in key careers and professions" and the 83rd-best college overall. As of 2017, according to Best Value Schools, Texas A&M graded first in the nation as the best college for military veterans, based on a return on investment. As of 2015, Texas A&M was rated the second-best university for veterans in USA Today and ninth for "business schools for veterans" by the Military Times.

=== Endowment ===
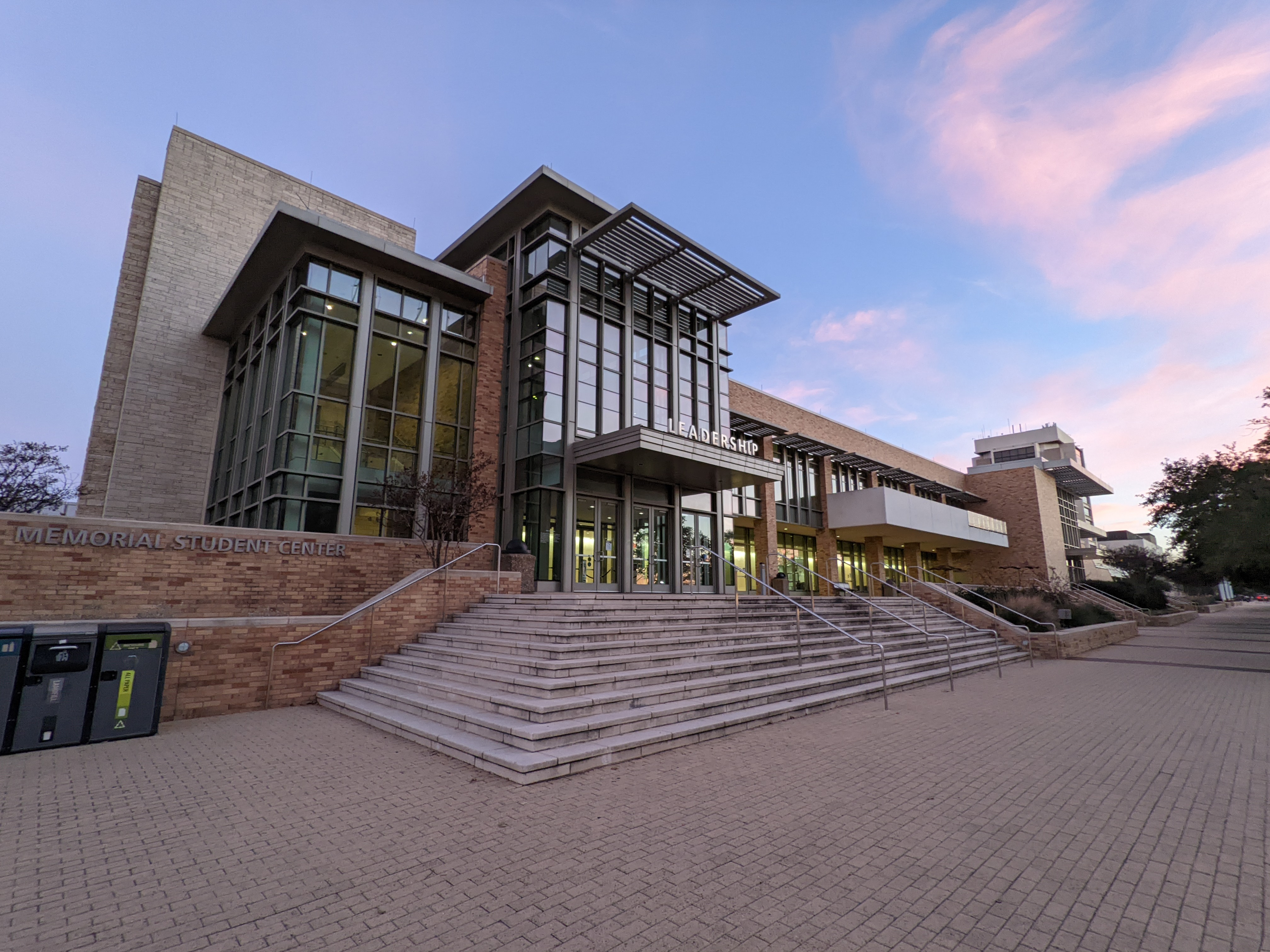
The Memorial Student Center

The Texas A&M University System has an endowment valued at more than $19.2 billion; the second highest among U.S. public universities and seventh overall. Apart from revenue received from tuition and research grants, as part of the university system, Texas A&M is partially funded from two endowments. The smaller endowment and investment assets, totaling $3.4 billion as of 2024, are run by the private Texas A&M Foundation. A larger sum is distributed from the Texas Permanent University Fund (PUF), in which the system holds a one-third stake. As of 2021, the PUF ending net-asset value was approximately $30 billion.

=== Research ===
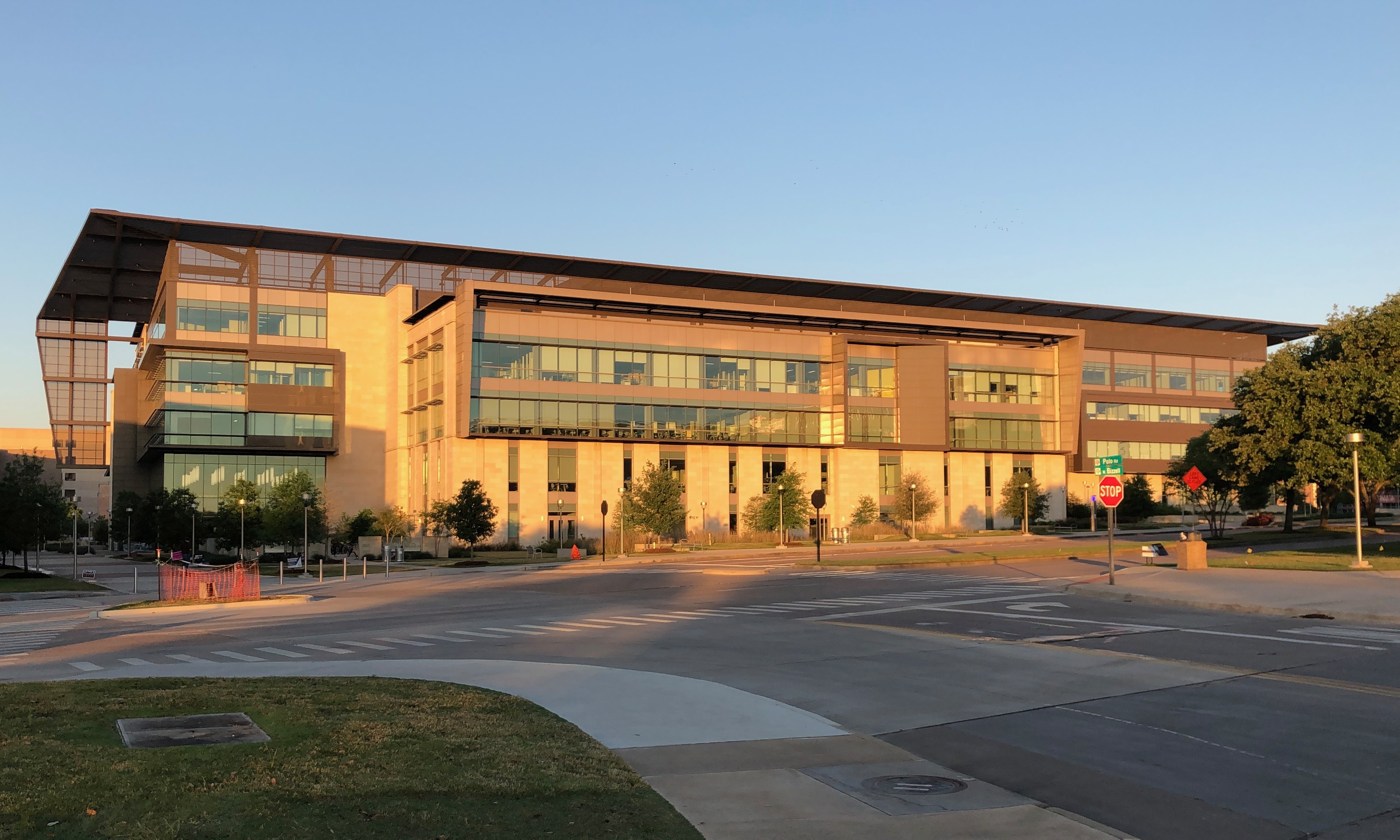
Zachry Engineering Education Complex

The National Science Foundation ranked Texas A&M 16th among American universities for research and development expenditures in 2021 with $1.14 billion. Concentrated in two primary areas, Research Valley and Research Park, the institution has over 11,750 acres (50 km^{2}), which includes 3,000,000 square feet (279,000 m^{2}) of dedicated research space. The Carnegie Classification of Institutions of Higher Education classifies Texas A&M among "R1: Doctoral Universities – Very high research activity" as of 2021. Its research entities include the Hagler Institute for Advanced Study, the Texas Institute for Genomic Medicine, the Texas Transportation Institute, the Cyclotron Institute, the Institute of Biosciences and Technology, and the Institute for Plant Genomics and Biotechnology. Texas A&M University is a member of the SEC Academic Consortium.

Texas A&M works with state and university agencies on local and international research projects to develop innovations in science and technology that can have commercial applications. In 2006, the Texas A&M University System was the first to explicitly state in its policy that technology commercialization could be used for tenure. Passage of this policy was intended to give faculty more academic freedom and strengthen the university's industry partnerships. The efforts of system-wide faculty and research departments have yielded millions of dollars for Texas A&M in royalty-bearing license agreements through more than 900 patents and 1,500 patent applications relating to a portfolio of over 2,600 inventions. On average, Texas A&M files over 50 patents and closes 25 license agreements per year.

Texas A&M has led the world in several fields of cloning research. Scientists at the university's College of Veterinary Medicine created the first cloned pet, a cat named "cc", on December 22, 2001. Texas A&M was also the first academic institution to clone six species; cattle, a Boer goat, pigs, a cat, a deer, and a horse. In 2016, the animal-rights group People for the Ethical Treatment of Animals (PETA) targeted the university and alleged abusive experiments on dogs. According to Texas A&M, the dogs in question were given several experimental treatments to improve or cure a genetic condition that also affects humans. During this period, the dogs were under the care of board-certified veterinarians and other highly trained staff with oversight from multiple agencies including the National Institutes of Health (NIH) and the Muscular Dystrophy Association.

The university is also engaged in significant scientific exploration projects. In 2004, as part of its responsibilities under the space grant program, it joined a consortium of universities and countries to build the Giant Magellan Telescope in Chile. Construction began in November 2015; on its completion—which is scheduled for 2025—it will be the largest optical telescope ever constructed with seven mirrors, each with a diameter of 8.4 meters (9.2 yd), the equivalent of a mirror 24.5 meters (26.8 yd) across and ten times more powerful than the Hubble Space Telescope. As part of a collaboration with the U.S. Department of Energy's National Nuclear Security Administration, Texas A&M completed the first conversion of a nuclear research reactor from using highly enriched uranium fuel (70%) to using low-enriched uranium (20%). The eighteen-month project ended on October 13, 2006, after the first-ever refueling of the reactor, thus fulfilling a portion of the United States' Global Nuclear Threat Reduction Initiative. In 2013, geography researchers named the largest volcano on Earth, Tamu Massif, after the university in honor of their research contributions.

=== Worldwide ===
Two professors, a graduate, and an undergraduate student at the TAMUQ branch campus

Of the university's numerous agreements and joint facilities of international cooperation, Texas A&M owns a multipurpose center in Mexico City, Soltis Research and Education Center near San Isidro, Costa Rica, and the Santa Chiara Study Abroad Center in Castiglion Fiorentino, Italy. During the 2018 academic year, over 5,600 Texas A&M students—primarily undergraduates—studied in 110 countries. Marine research occurs on the university's branch campus, Texas A&M University at Galveston. It also has collaborations with international facilities such as Hacienda Santa Clara in San Miguel de Allende, Guanajuato, Mexico.

The university is one of two American universities in partnership with CONACyT, Mexico's equivalent of the National Science Foundation, to support research in areas including biotechnology, telecommunications, energy, and urban development. The university also hosts Las Americas Digital Research Network, an online architecture network for 26 universities in 12 nations, primarily in Central and South America.

Founded in 1995 by then-emir Sheikh Hamad bin Khalifa Al Thani and his wife, who is the mother of the current emir Sheikha Moza bint Nasser, Texas A&M University at Qatar was set up through an agreement between Texas A&M and the Qatar Foundation for Education, Science, and Community Development and continues its part of Qatar's efforts to expand higher education with the assistance of elite institutions from the United States. All degrees at the Qatar campus are granted by the university's TAMU College of Engineering. TAMUQ was opened in 2003, and the current contract extends through 2023. The campus offers undergraduate degrees in chemical, electrical, mechanical and petroleum engineering, and a graduate degree in chemical engineering. TAMUQ has received awards for its research. Texas A&M receives $76.2 million per year from the Qatar Foundation for the campus. In the agreement with the Qatar Foundation, TAMU agreed 70% of its undergraduates at its Qatar campus would be Qatari citizens. The curriculum is designed to emulate the academic rigors of the facility at College Station but critics question whether this is possible due to Qatar's strict stance on some of the freedoms granted to U.S. students. TAMU has also been criticized over its Qatari campus due to Qatar's alleged ties to Islamic terrorism and the country's human rights record. In 2016, Texas A&M Aggie Conservatives, a campus activism group, criticized the campus and called for its immediate closure on the grounds it violated a commitment to educating Texans and diminished the credibility of engineering degrees of students at College Station. On 7 January 2024, Mark A. Welsh III, President of TAMU, addressed inaccuracies and misconceptions circulating on various websites and social media platforms regarding the university and its branch campus in Qatar and shared accurate information. Nevertheless, the university announced on 9 February 2024 that it would be closing its Qatar campus by 2028. In January 2026, the US Department of Education reported that Texas A&M had disclosed $993 million in gifts and contracts from Qatar.

In 2013, Texas A&M signed an agreement to open a $200 million campus in Nazareth, Israel, as a "peace campus" for Arabs and Israelis. The agreement led to protests from students at the Qatari campus, who called it "an insult to [their] people". The planned campus in Nazareth was never opened; instead, Texas A&M opened a $6 million marine biology center in Haifa, Israel, in 2016.

== Student life ==
Student body composition as of May 2, 2023
| Race and ethnicity | Total |
|---|---|
| White | 54% |
| Hispanic | 25% |
| Asian | 13% |
| Two or more races | 4% |
| Black | 3% |
| International student | 1% |
Economic diversity
| Low-income (Note: The percentage of students who received an income-based federal Pell grant intended for low-income students.) | 20% |
| Affluent (Note: The percentage of students who are a part of the American middle class at the bare minimum.) | 80% |

=== Residential life ===
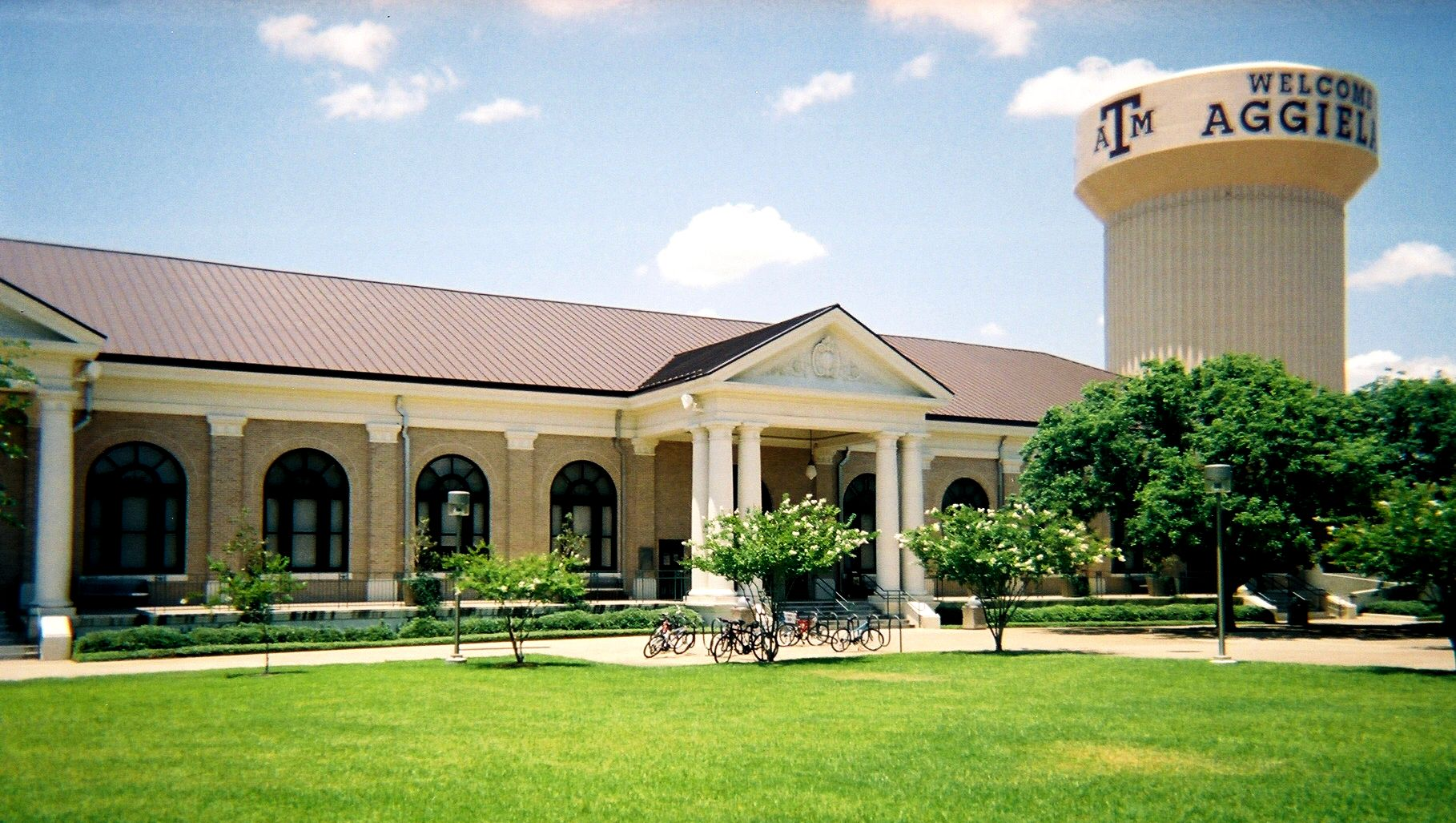
Sbisa Dining Hall and central utility plant water tower sporting the greeting, "Welcome to Aggieland"

As of 2020, approximately 20% of the Texas A&M student body lived on campus, primarily in one of two distinct housing sections located on opposite ends of the campus. Both the Northside and Southside areas contain student residence halls. Some halls are single-sex. Several halls include a "substance-free" floor whose residents pledge to refrain from bringing alcoholic beverages, recreational drugs, or tobacco products into the hall.

Northside consists of seventeen student residence halls, including two dedicated to honors students. Approximately half of the residence halls on campus are reserved for members of the Corps of Cadets. The university also has four major apartment complexes for both staff and students, which are located both on and adjacent to the campus.

Facilities for the Corps of Cadets are located in the Quadrangle, known as "The Quad", an area consisting of dormitories, Duncan Dining Hall, and the Corps training fields. The Corps Arches, a series of twelve arches that allude to the spirit of the 12th Man, mark the entrance to the Quadrangle. All cadets, except those who are married or who have had previous military service, must live in the Quad with assigned roommates from the same unit and graduating class. The Aggie mascot Reveille, a Rough Collie, lives with her handlers in the Corps in the Quad.

=== Corps of Cadets ===
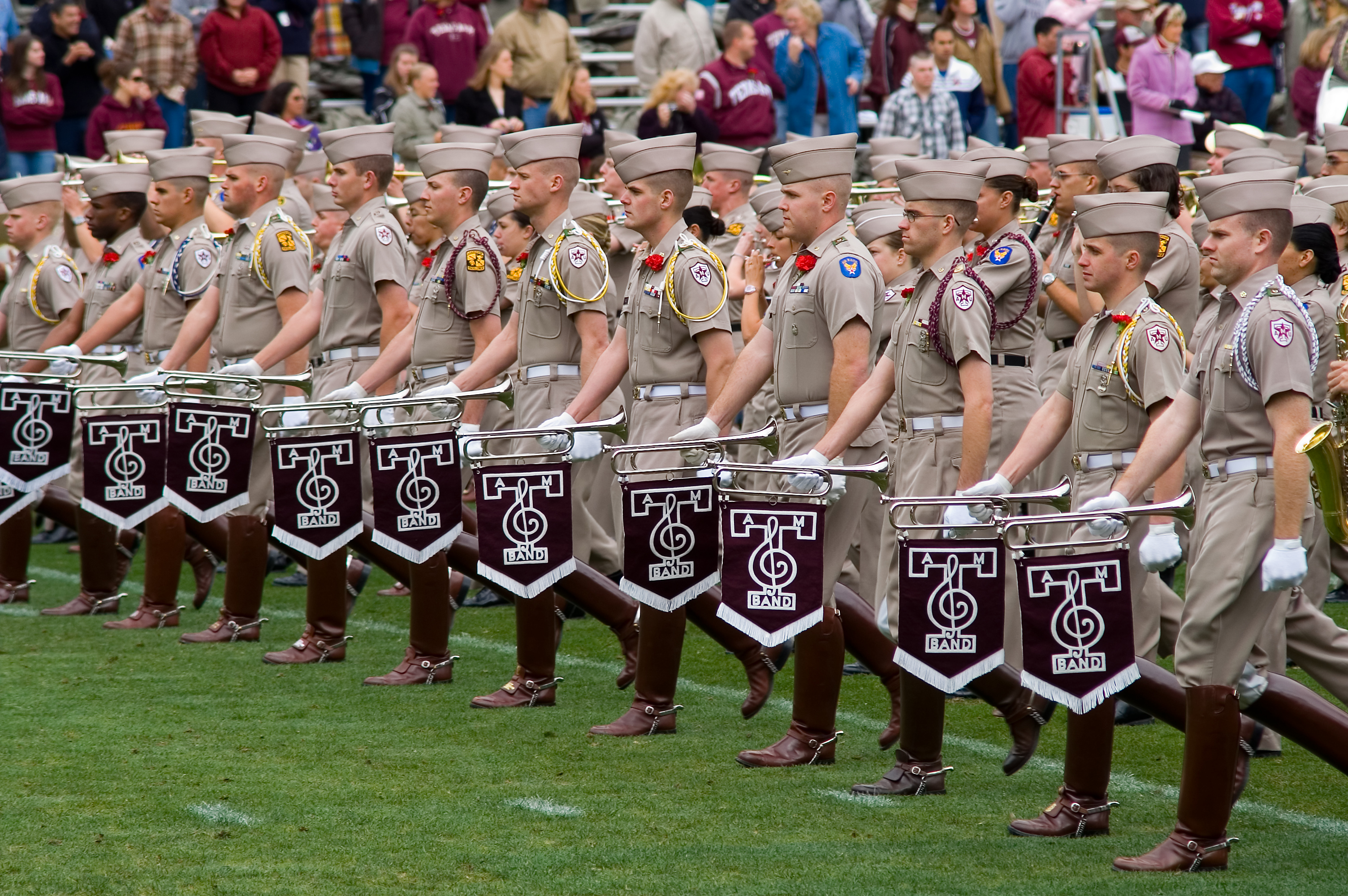
The Fightin' Texas Aggie Band's Bugle Rank leads the band at halftime at a football game.

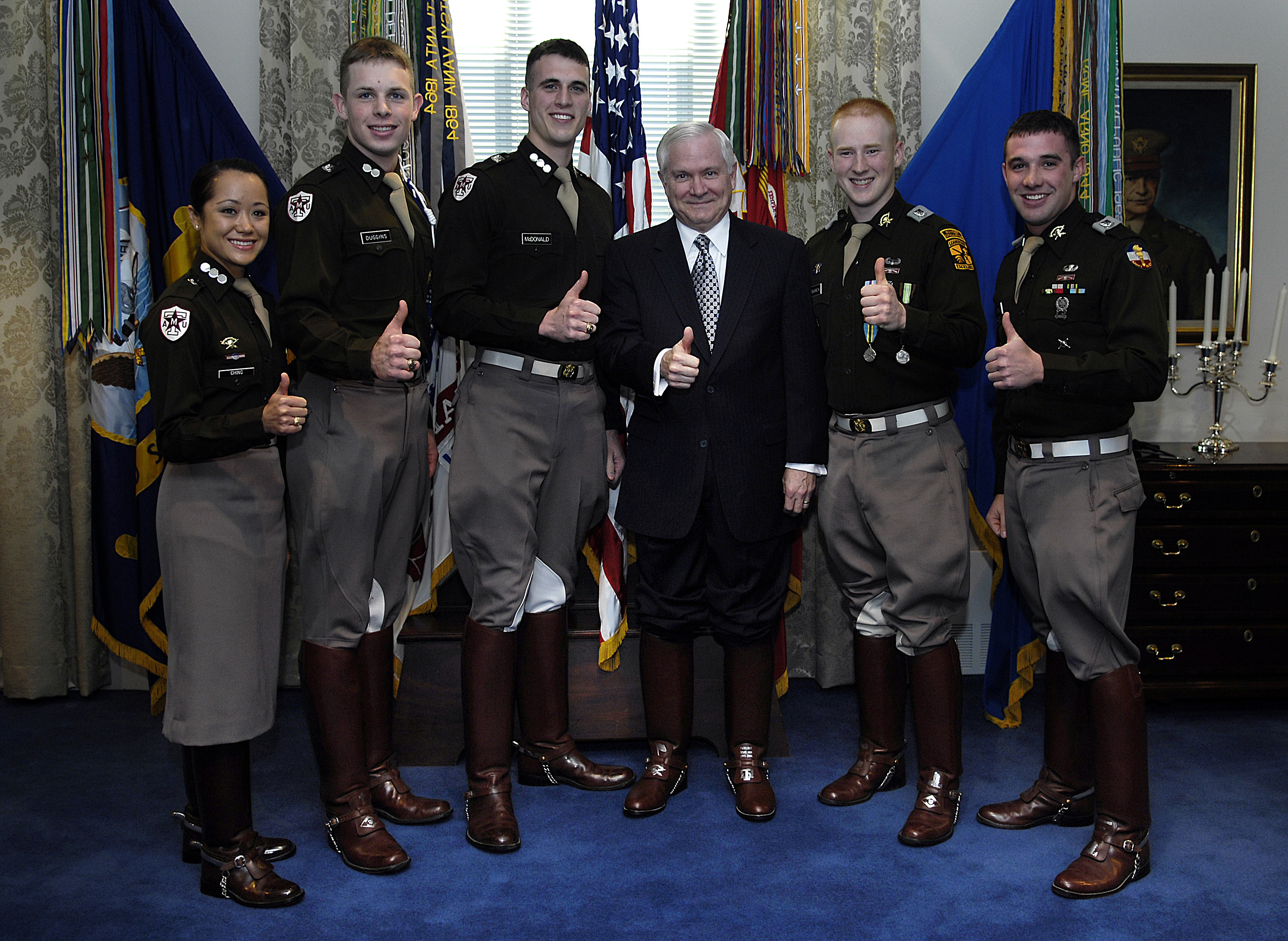
Robert Gates and senior cadets from the Corps of Cadets give the "gig 'em" sign at the Pentagon.

Texas A&M is one of six United States senior military colleges. As of 2019, the university's Corps of Cadets (or the Corps), with more than 2,500 members, is the largest uniformed student body outside the service academies. Many members participate in Reserve Officers' Training Corps (ROTC) programs and earn commissions in the United States Armed Forces upon graduation. Members of the Corps have served in every armed conflict fought by the United States since 1876, and over 285 alumni have served as generals or flag officers as of 2021. Until 1965, Corps membership was mandatory. The Corps began accepting female members in the fall semester of 1974.

The Corps of Cadets is composed of four major units, the Air Force Wing, the Army Brigade, the Navy/Marine Regiment, and the Fightin' Texas Aggie Band, whose members may be affiliated with any military branch. Parson's Mounted Cavalry is the only mounted ROTC unit in the United States. The Ross Volunteer Company, one of the oldest student-run organizations in the state, is the official honor guard for the Governor of Texas. The Fish Drill Team, a precision, close-order rifle drill team composed entirely of Corps freshmen, represents Texas A&M in local and national competitions. The team has won the national championship almost every year since their creation in 1946, and has appeared in several Hollywood films, including A Few Good Men and Courage Under Fire, in which they had prominent roles.

The Fightin' Texas Aggie Band, the nation's largest precision military marching band, provides music for university functions and presents halftime performances at football games. Some band drills are so complicated they require band members to step between each other's feet to complete the maneuvers. Membership of the Corps of Cadets is a requirement for joining the Aggie Band, whose members live by the same standards, schedules, and regimens as the rest of the Corps.

=== Activities ===
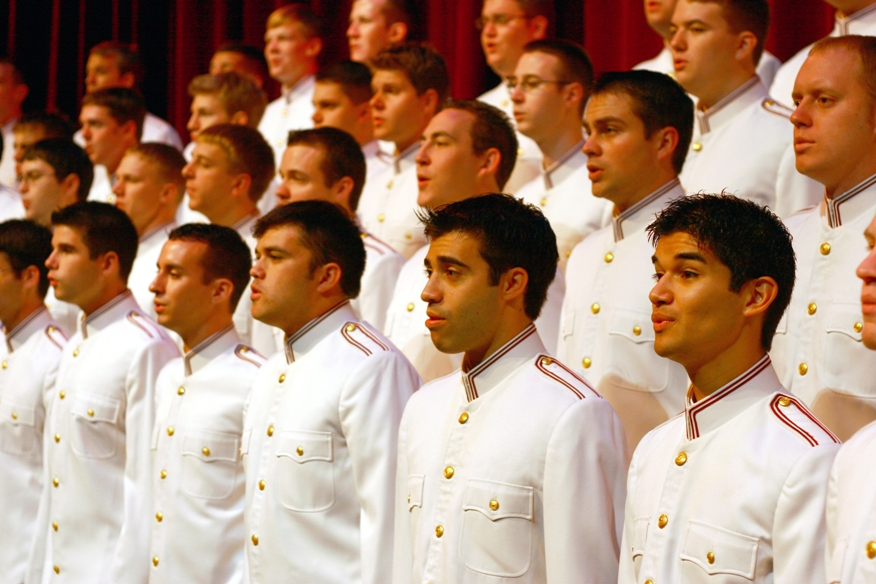
The Texas A&M University Singing Cadets

Texas A&M has over 1,000 student organizations, including academic, service, religious, social, and common interest organizations, and hosts 58 nationally or internationally recognized Greek Letter Organizations (GLOs). About 10% of the undergraduate population is affiliated with a GLO fraternity or sorority.

One of the oldest student organizations is the Singing Cadets, an all-male choral group not affiliated with the Corps of Cadets with about 70 members that was founded in 1893. Texas A&M Hillel, the oldest Hillel organization in the United States, was founded in 1920 at the original college. Since 1955, the MSC Student Conference on National Affairs has held conferences, lectures, and other programs to discuss national and international issues with speakers. The Department of Recreational Sports provides athletic activities to the university community; sports facilities include the Student Recreation Center, a natatorium; the Penberthy Rec Sports Complex; and the Omar Smith Instructional Tennis Center. The Student Government Association (SGA), one of A&M's largest organizations, has over 1,300 student members in three branches, fifteen committees, and four commissions. The Graduate Student Council, founded in 1995, serves as the student government for Texas A&M University's graduate and professional students. Business Student Council, founded in 1968, serves as the student government for Mays Business School and hosts the largest student-run business run career fair in the nation. The Student Engineers' Council (SEC), founded in 1939, serves to represent engineering students, increase awareness regarding engineering, and foster professional development for engineering students.

Student organizations have had a nationwide impact. Texas A&M students founded the largest one-day, student-run service project in America known as The Big Event. The annual service project allows students to serve the community by assisting local residents. Such events are now also held at other universities. The organization CARPOOL, a student-run safe ride program, has provided over 250,000 free rides (as of 2016) to students who are unable to transport themselves home. Its organizers help other universities establish similar programs. In 2009, GLBT Aggies, formerly Gay Student Services (GSS), successfully sued the university for official recognition and the Fifth U.S. Circuit Court of Appeals ruled the U.S. Constitution requires public universities to allow such student organizations under the First Amendment's "freedom to assemble" clause.

=== Media ===
The university newspaper The Battalion has been in production since 1893. The Aggieland, formerly known as The Olio and The Longhorn, is one of America's largest college yearbooks in number of pages and copies sold. The Mugdown is the university's satirical student newspaper, first published in 2014.

As of 2007, the university houses three public broadcasting stations: KAMU-TV, a PBS member station since 1970; KAMU-FM, a National Public Radio affiliate since 1977, and the student-run station KANM, which bills itself "the college station of College Station". W5AC, a student-run amateur radio club, broadcast the first live, play-by-play broadcast of a college football game at Kyle Field in November 1921.

== Traditions ==
Aggie ring for the class of 2004

Texas A&M culture is a product of the university's founding as a rural military and agricultural school. Although the school and surrounding community have grown and military training is no longer mandated, the university's history has instilled in students, according to Paul Burka, "the idealized elements of a small-town life: community, tradition, loyalty, optimism, and unabashed sentimentality". Texas Monthly posits that Texas A&M students' respect for school traditions and values is the university's greatest strength. These traditions enable and encourage students and alumni to cultivate the Aggie Spirit, a strong sense of loyalty and respect for the university. They dictate many aspects of student life, including greeting others using the official school greeting of "Howdy!", personal conduct at university sporting events, and students' word choices in conversation.

A visible designation tradition among senior undergraduates, graduate students nearing the end of their programs, and former students is wearing an Aggie Ring, whose design has been relatively unchanged since its introduction in 1894. Although not sanctioned by the university, many students "dunk" their newly acquired Aggie Rings into a pitcher of beer and drink the entire pitcher in seconds.

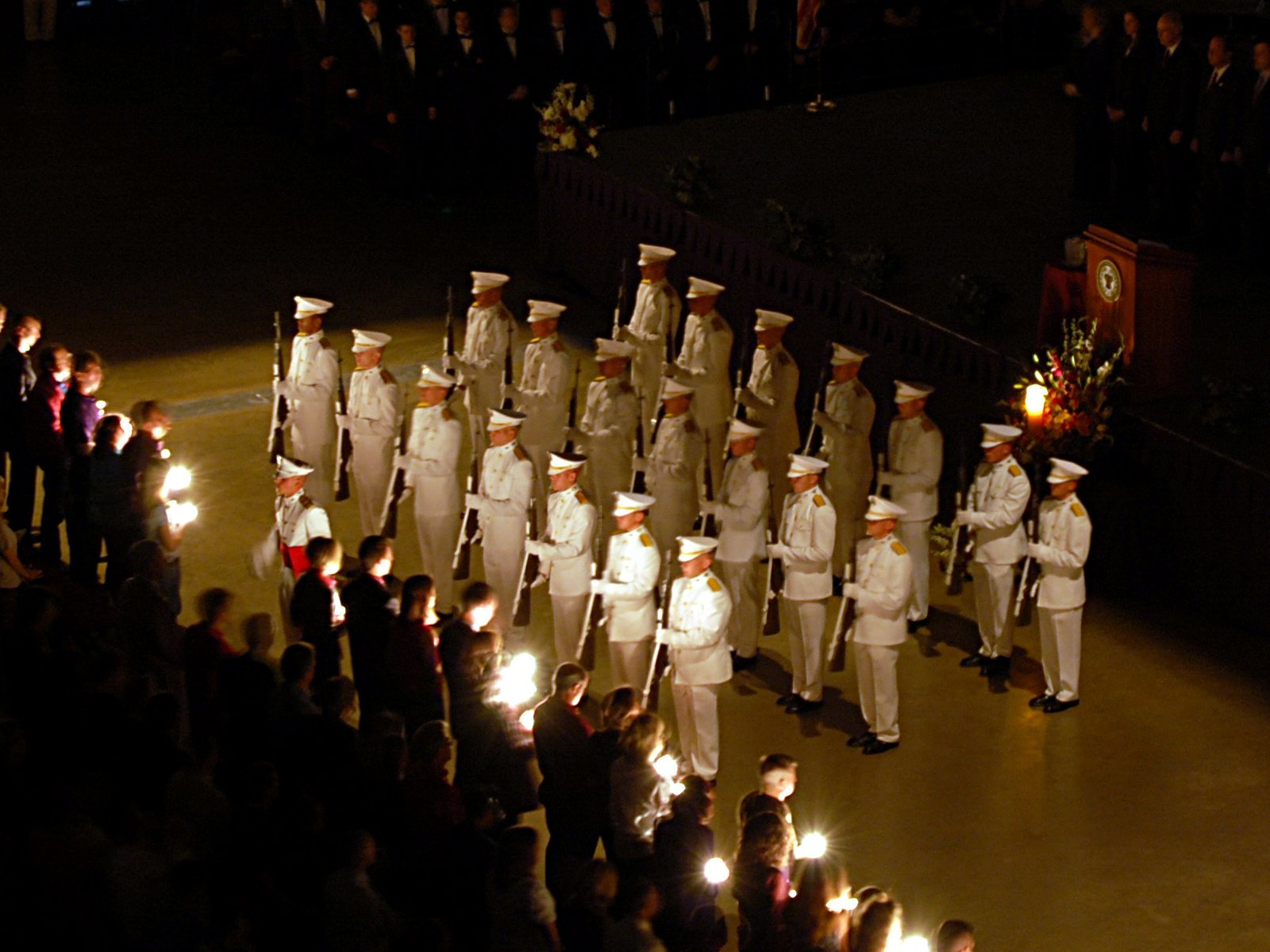
The Ross Volunteers perform a rifleman's salute as candles are lit for the deceased at the 2007 Aggie Muster at Reed Arena.

Texas A&M students have created two major traditions to honor deceased former students. The Aggie Muster is a ceremony of remembrance held annually on April 21, the anniversary of the Battle of San Jacinto, to honor current and former students who died the previous year. Alumni also typically socialize and remember their time at the university. Over 300 Musters are held around the world, the largest taking place at Reed Arena on the university's main campus. All Muster ceremonies feature the Roll Call for the Absent, in which names of deceased alumni are called. A family member or friend answers "here" and lights a candle to symbolize that although their loved one is not physically present, his or her spirit will shine forever. This is traditionally followed by a three-volley salute. The event received nationwide attention during World War II, when 25 Texas A&M alumni held a brief Aggie Muster during the Battle of Corregidor.

Students who die while enrolled at Texas A&M are honored at Silver Taps, a ceremony that is held, when necessary, on the first Tuesday of the month. This tradition began as a memorial for former Texas A&M president Lawrence Sullivan Ross. On the day of the ceremony, flags fly at half-staff and notices are posted throughout campus. At 10:15 pm, lights around campus are extinguished and hymns are chimed from Albritton Tower while students and faculty gather in the Academic Plaza. Following a three-volley salute by the Ross Volunteer Firing Squad, six buglers play "Silver Taps", a choral version of the bugle call "Taps", from the dome of the university's Academic Building. The song is played three times: once toward the north, once toward the south, and once toward the west. The song is not played to the east, symbolizing that the sun will never again rise on the deceased student.

=== Sports ===
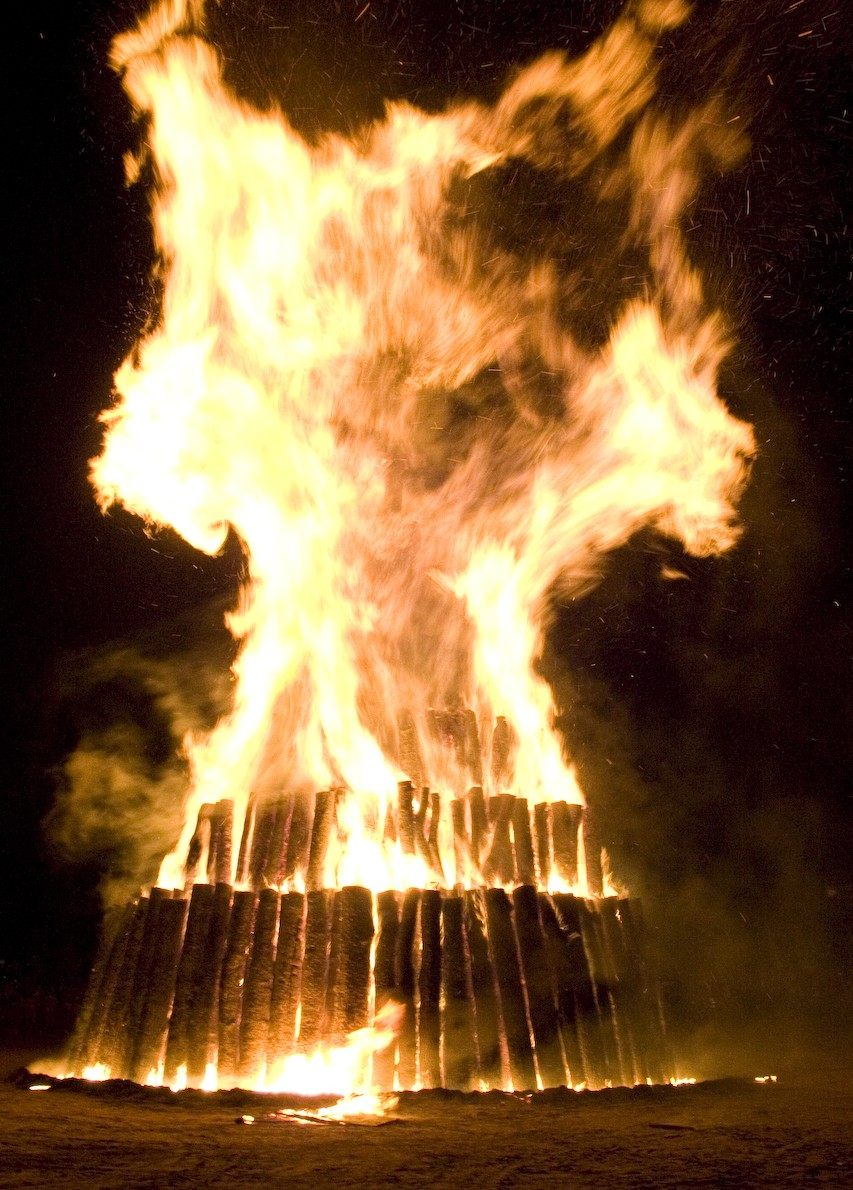
The 2007 Student Bonfire

At university sporting events, Texas A&M students collectively are called the 12th Man; in the context of football games, this symbolizes students supporting the eleven players on the field and being willing to enter the game if necessary. To symbolize their zeal and motivation, it is traditional for students to stand throughout the sports game. The tradition of standing for games began on January 2, 1922, at the Dixie Classic, in which Texas A&M played Centre College. Texas A&M had so many injuries Coach Dana X. Bible feared he would not have enough men to finish the game. He called into the stands for E. King Gill, a reserve who had left football after the regular season to play basketball, to prepare to play in the game. Texas A&M won 22–14 but E. King Gill was the only player left available on the sidelines for the team. In recent decades, the 12th Man is represented on the field by a walk-on player who wears a number-twelve jersey and participates in kick-offs.

The 12th Man uses a variety of school yells, rather than cheers, to support Aggie teams. Each year, the student body elects five students to serve as Yell Leaders. At midnight before each home football game at Kyle Field, or at a designated location at away games, fans gather to practice yells for the next day's game at an event called Midnight Yell Practice. Led by the Yell Leaders and the Fightin' Texas Aggie Band, the 12th Man practice yells, sing the War Hymn, joke about their opponents, and practice celebrating. Sports Illustrated named Midnight Yell as one of the "100 Things You Gotta Do Before You Graduate". At home football games, the 12th Man consists of more than 36,000 Texas A&M students and forms the largest student section in college football. When singing the war hymn, A&M students cause the stands to sway; visiting press are warned prior to the game.

Almost every year since 1909, Texas A&M students have built a large bonfire to celebrate their rivalry with the University of Texas at Austin. Aggie Bonfire was traditionally lit around Thanksgiving in conjunction with the festivities surrounding the annual college football game between the universities. Although it began as a trash pile, Aggie Bonfire evolved into a massive, six-tiered structure, achieving a then-world-record height for a bonfire of 109 feet (30 m). On November 18, 1999, the Aggie Bonfire collapsed during construction. Eleven enrolled students and one former student died and twenty-seven others were injured. The accident was later attributed to improper design and poor construction practices. The victims' family members filed six lawsuits against Texas A&M officials, Aggie Bonfire officials, and the university. Half of the defendants settled their portion of the case in 2005, and a federal appeals court dismissed the remaining lawsuits against the university in 2007. Following the collapse, the university suspended the official sanction of the bonfire, but the tradition continues off-campus.

== Athletics ==
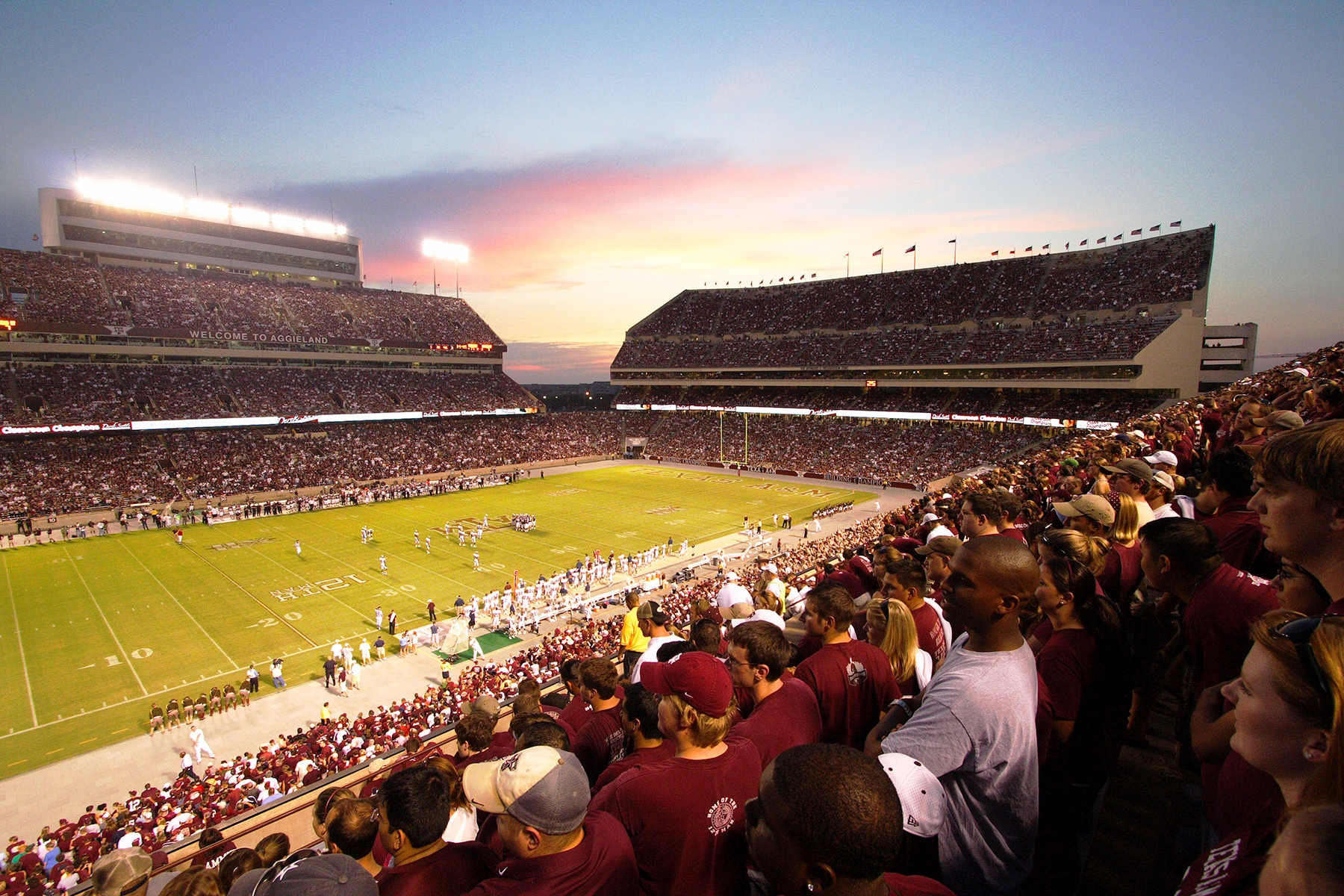
A view from the student section of Kyle Field during a 2007 football game

Texas A&M University has been a member of the Southeastern Conference (SEC) of the NCAA for all sports since 2012. It was previously a charter member of the Southwest Conference until its dissolution in 1996 and competed in the Big 12 Conference until June 30, 2012. The university has twenty sports teams, which are known as the Aggies, whose team colors are maroon and white. As of 2026, Aggies had won 181 conference titles and 24 national championships.

Texas A&M's archrival is the University of Texas at Austin Longhorns. The rivalry was renewed in 2024 when the Longhorns joined the SEC, ending the hiatus that began in 2011. In 2004, sporting events between the Aggies and the Longhorns became known as the Lone Star Showdown; the most-watched event in the rivalry was the annual football game held on Thanksgiving. Texas A&M's other current rivalries include the University of Arkansas Razorbacks and more intensely, the Louisiana State University Tigers, with the latter rivalry becoming particularly strong since Texas A&M's 74-72 victory in 2018. Historic rivals who were played during the Big 12 and Southwest Conference days, now dormant, include Texas Tech University and Baylor University.

The Texas A&M Athletic Hall of Fame was established in 1964 to "acknowledge athletes whose accomplishments on the field have brought credit to Texas A&M". As of 2018, it has 297 inductees. The Hall of Fame also hosts the Hall of Honor and Lettermen's Lifetime Achievement Award. The Texas A&M Athletic Hall of Honor was established in 1977 to "recognizes individuals who have gone above and beyond in contributions and support of the athletic programs at Texas A&M". The Lettermen's Lifetime Achievement Award was established in 2011 to recognize "lettermen, who after graduation, have gone on to gain prominence through his or her efforts in industry, commerce, technology, athletics, the professions, or other worthy endeavors".

=== Football ===
The Aggies football team, which was founded in 1894, has won eighteen Southwest Conference championships, three Big 12 South Division championships, and one Big 12 championship. The university also claims three national championships. As of 2021, the team has played in forty-two bowl games, of which they have won twenty, and former players include forty-one first Team All-Americans, five Academic All-Americans, and Heisman Trophy winners John David Crow (1957) and Johnny Manziel (2012). Since 1904, home football games have been played at Kyle Field, a stadium with a current capacity of 102,733. As of 2024, the football team is led by Mike Elko in his second season as head coach.

=== Basketball ===
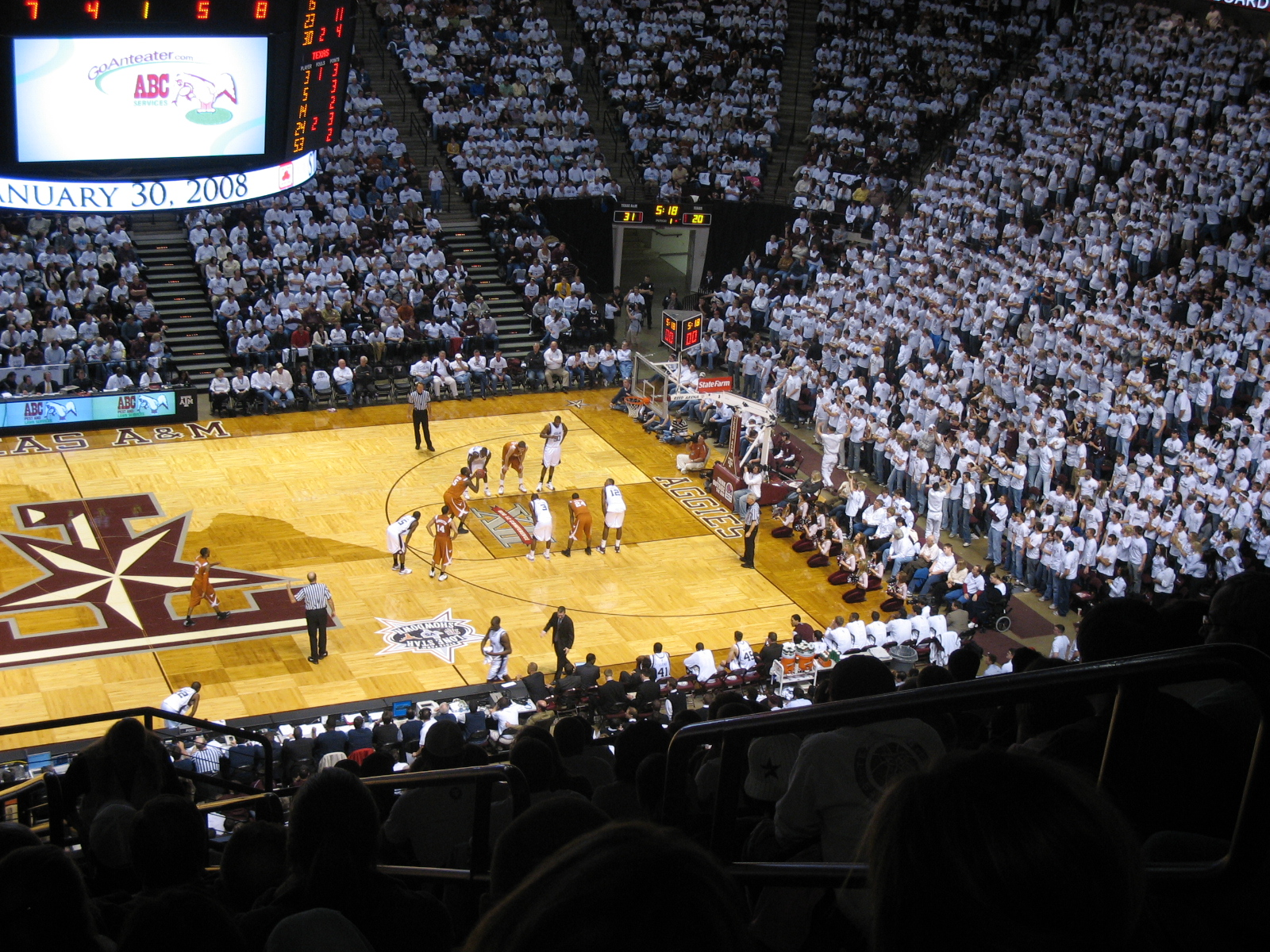
A men's basketball game at Reed Arena in January 2008

The Aggies men's basketball team, which was founded in 1912, has won eleven Southwest Conference championships and two Southwest Conference Tournament championships. The team has played in the National Invitation Tournament six times and in the NCAA Tournament eleven times, of which three resulted in the team progressing to the regional semifinals round, dubbed Sweet Sixteen—the highest round to which the Aggies have advanced—most recently in the 2015–16 season. As of 2025, the men's basketball team is led by Bucky McMillan in his first season as head coach.

The women's basketball team has won one Southwest Conference Tournament championship, one regular season Big 12 Conference championship, two Big 12 Tournament championships, and two SEC Tournament championships—most recently in 2021. As of 2022, the Aggies women's team has advanced to sixteen NCAA Tournament appearances, including fourteen consecutive seasons, and won the National Championship in 2011. They have also twice competed in the Women's National Invitation Tournament, which they won in 1995. The women's team was coached by Gary Blair from 2003 to his retirement in 2022. Blair's replacement Joni Taylor began coaching the team in March 2022.

Both the men's and women's basketball teams play in the 12,889-seat Reed Arena, which opened in 1998.

=== Other sports ===
The Aggies women's soccer team was formed in 1993; as of 2021, it has taken part in every NCAA Tournament since 1995. The women's volleyball team is a frequent qualifier for the annual NCAA tournament, and has played in thirteen consecutive NCAA Tournaments from 1993 to 2005. Texas A&M also fields men's and women's teams in swimming and diving, golf, tennis, cross country, track and field, softball, baseball, rugby union and equestrianism. Texas A&M's Archery Club is one of the most successful collegiate archery programs in the nation, with 24 USA Archery collegiate national titles to their name.

== Notable alumni and faculty ==
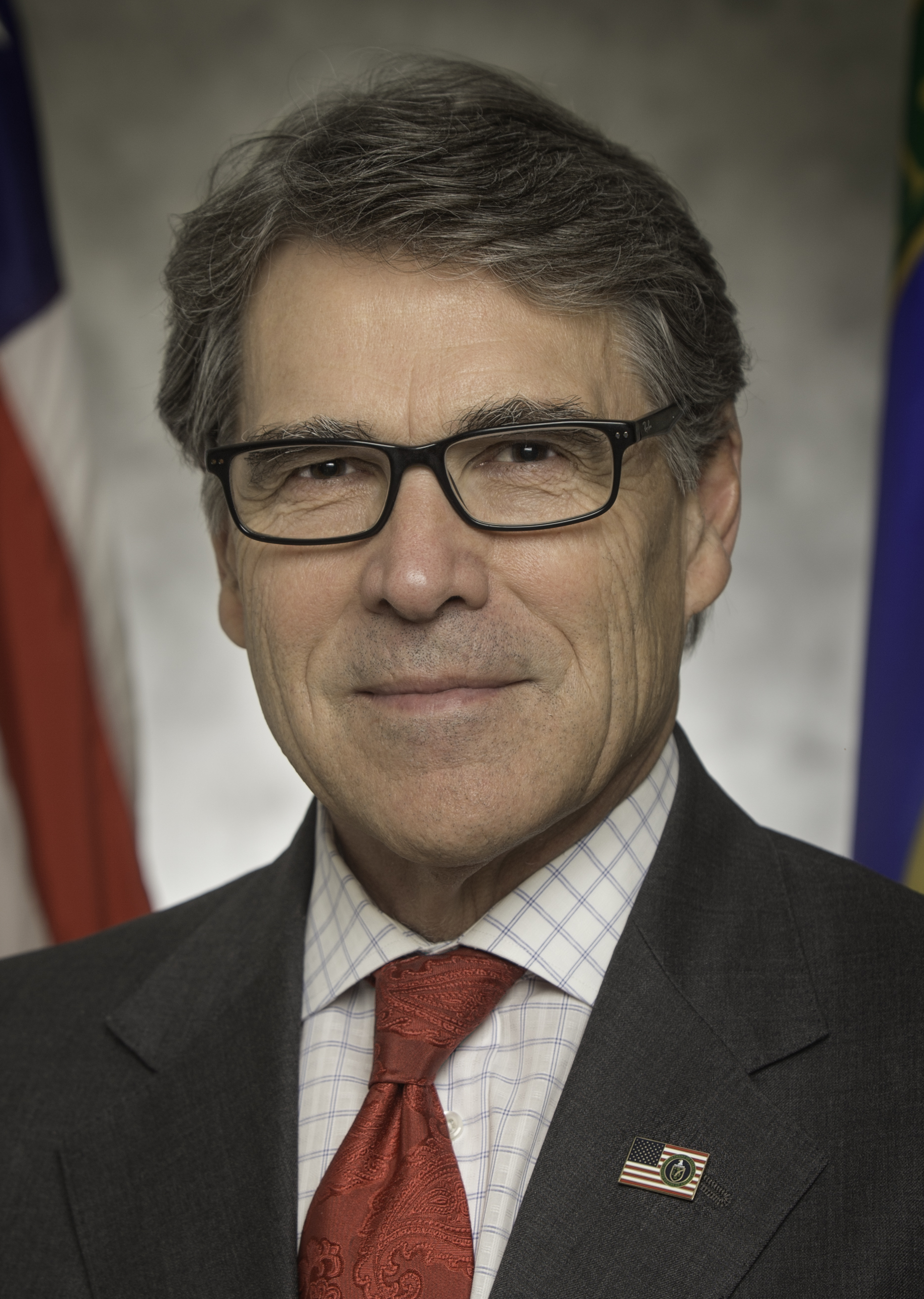
Rick Perry (1972), 47th governor of Texas and 14th U.S. secretary of energy

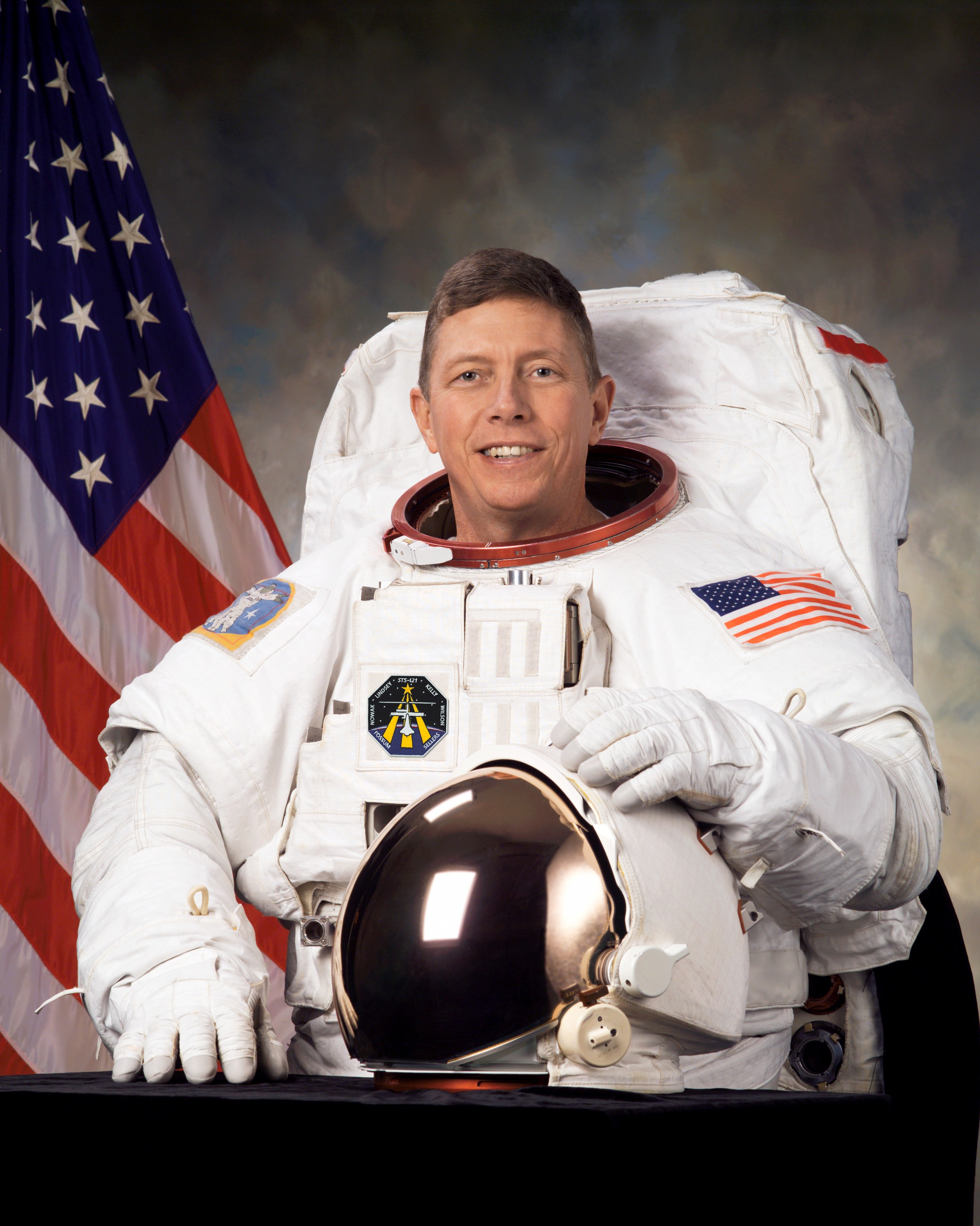
Michael E. Fossum (1980), NASA astronaut and commander of Expedition 29

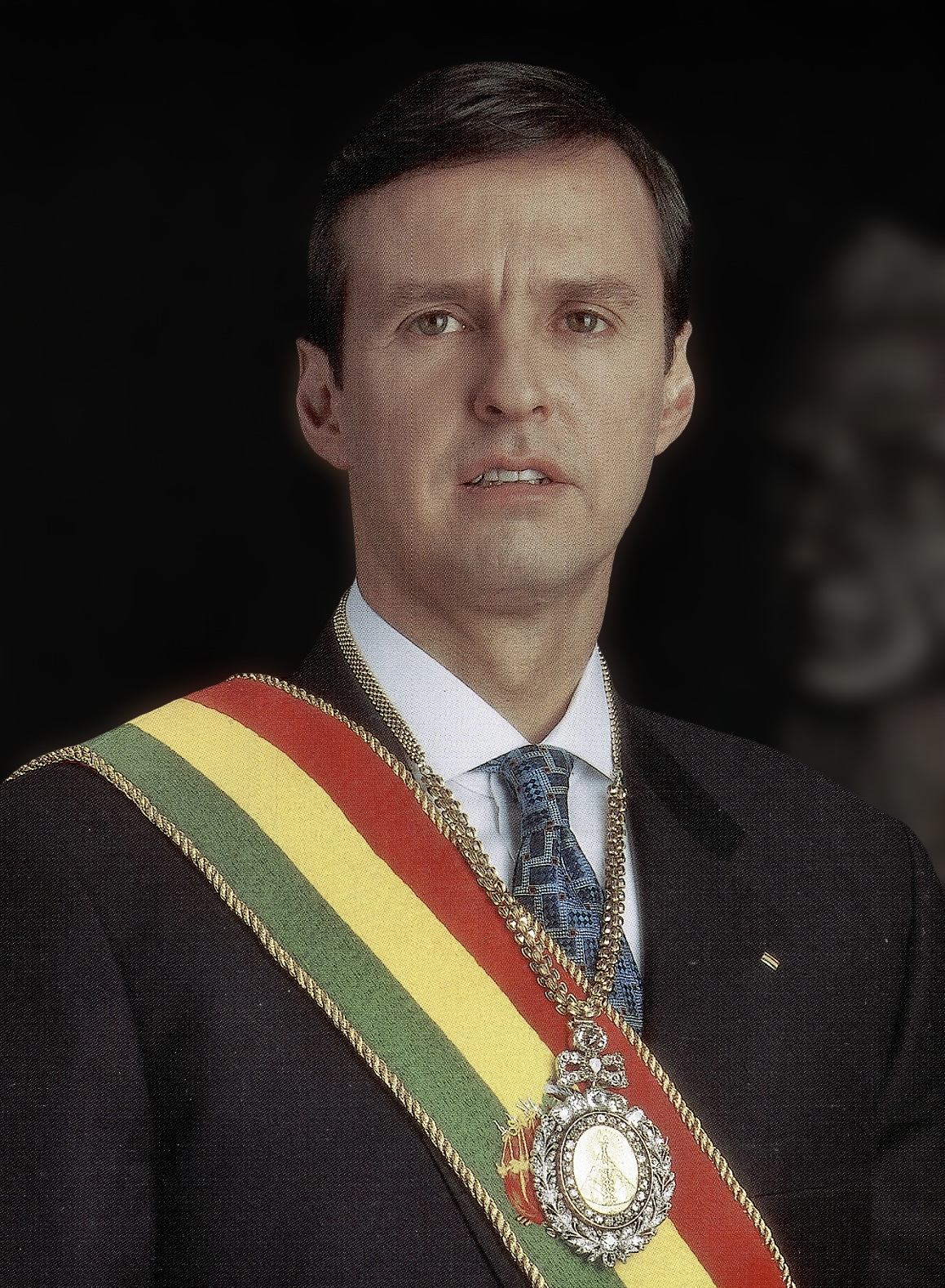
Jorge Quiroga (1981), 62nd president of Bolivia

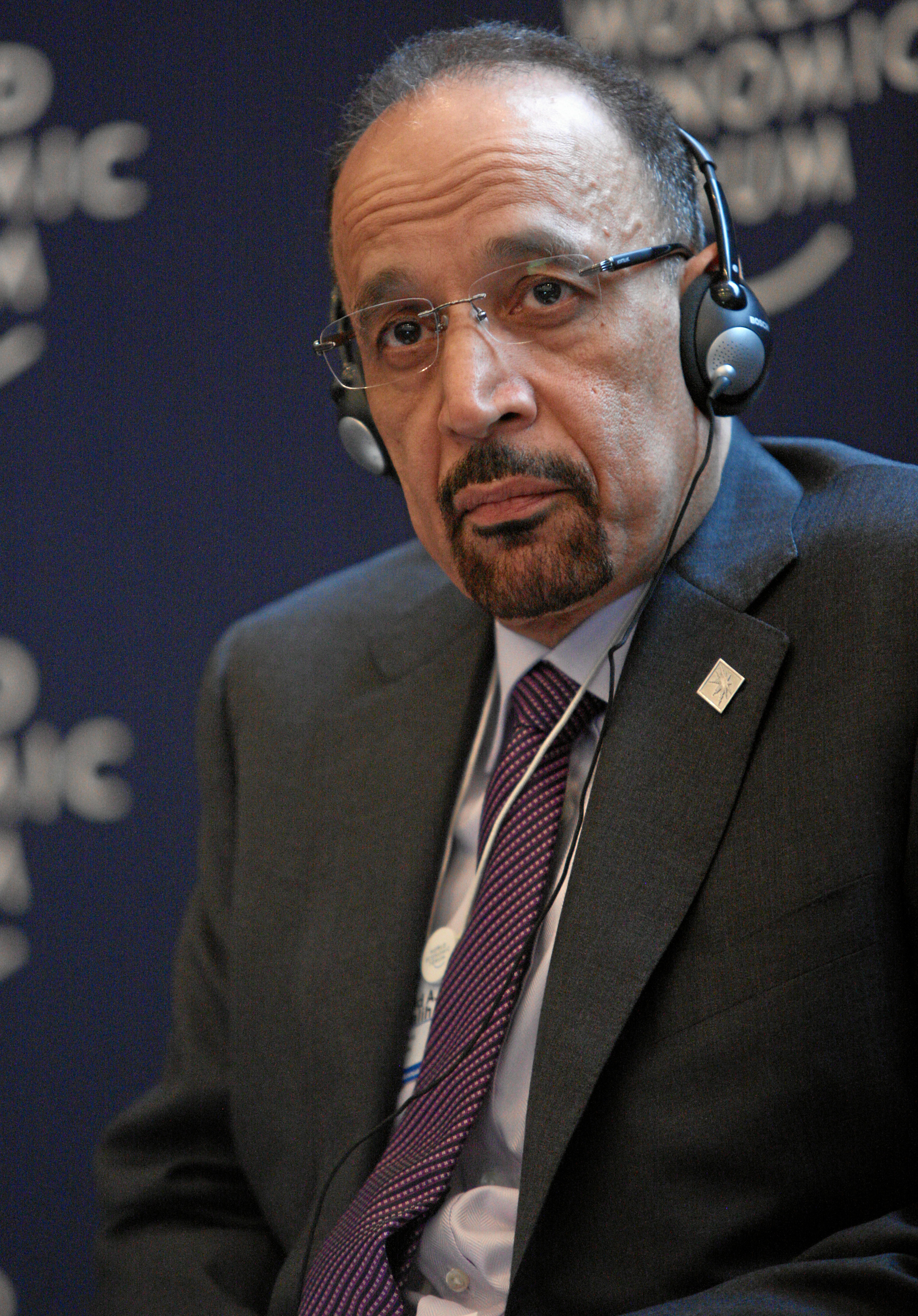
Khalid A. Al-Falih (1982), former president and CEO of Saudi Aramco

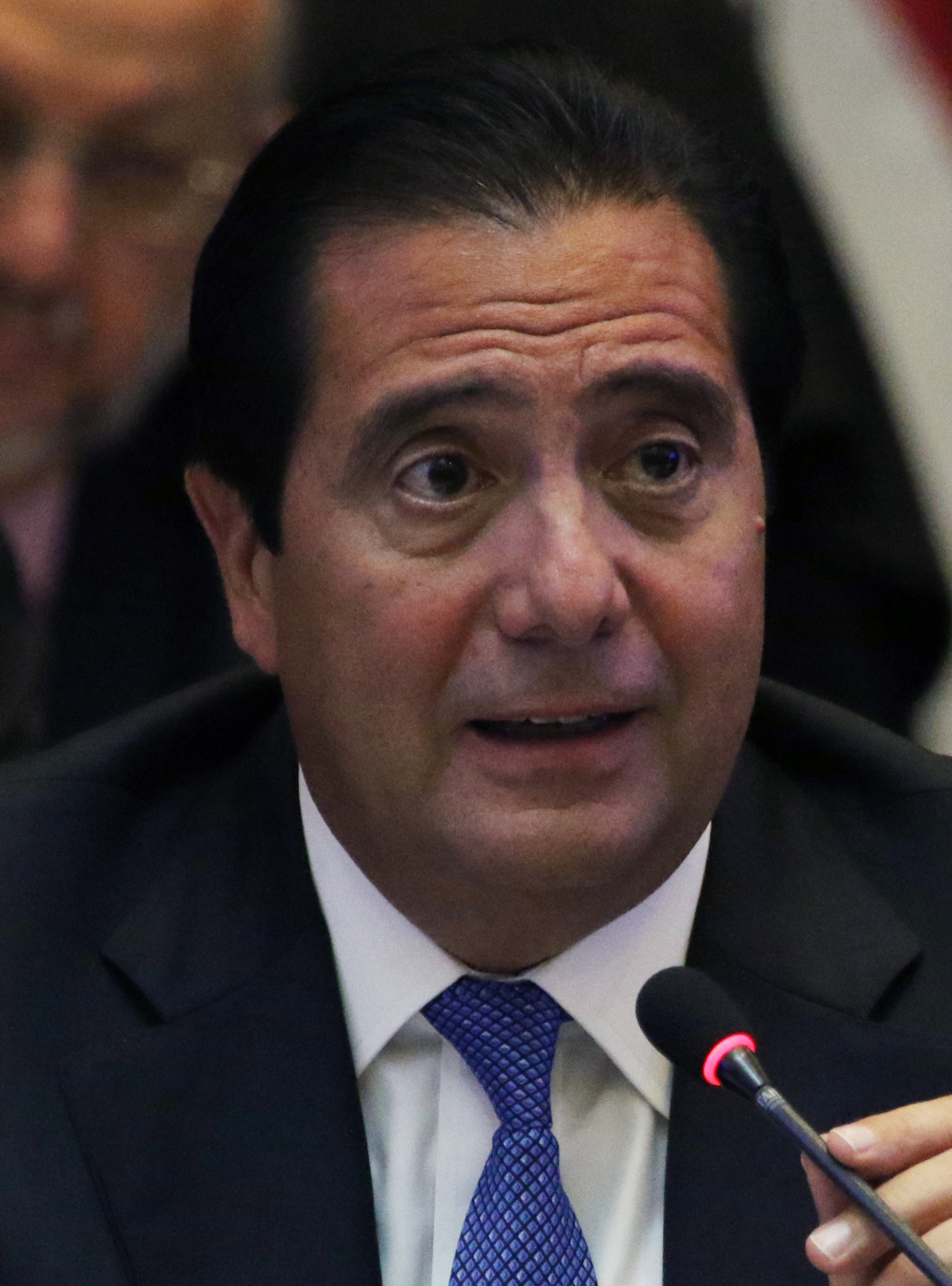
Martín Torrijos (1987), 35th president of Panama

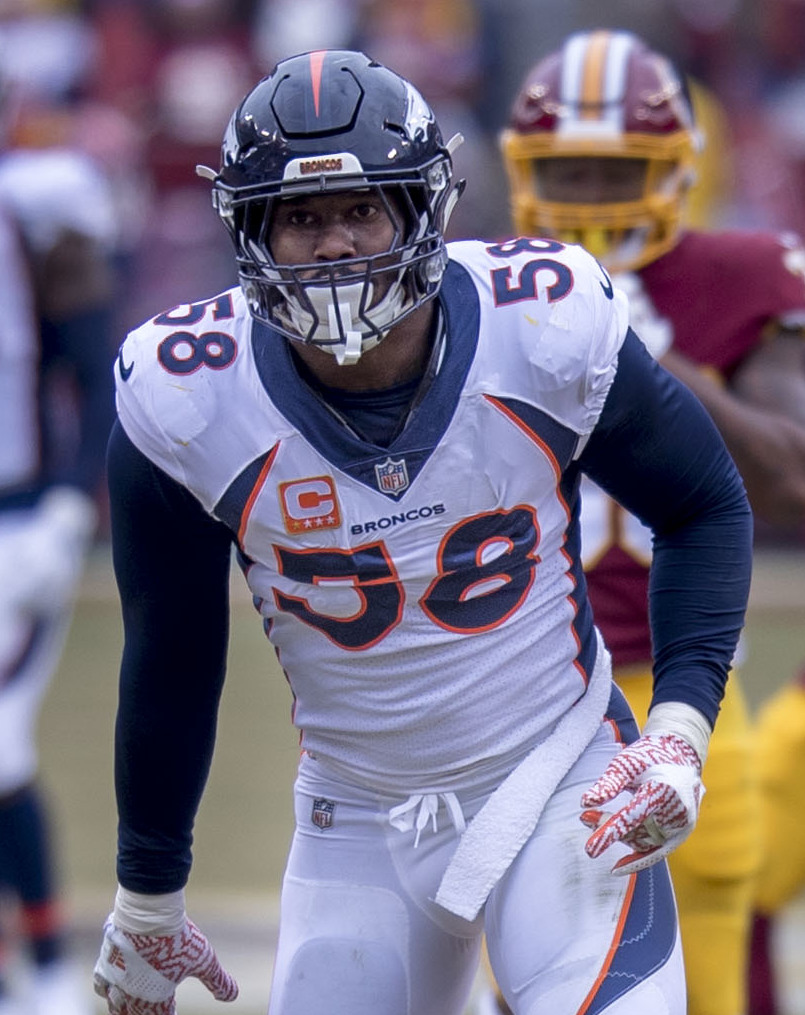
Von Miller (2011), NFL linebacker and Super Bowl 50 MVP

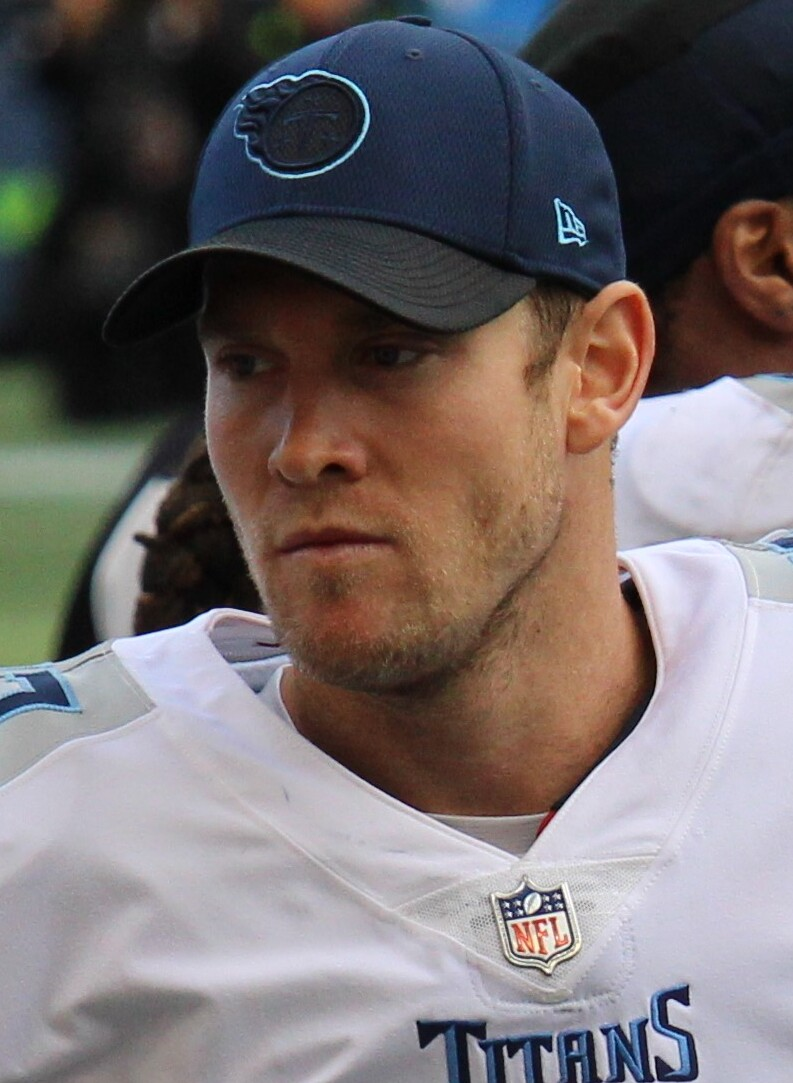
Ryan Tannehill (2011), NFL quarterback

=== Alumni ===
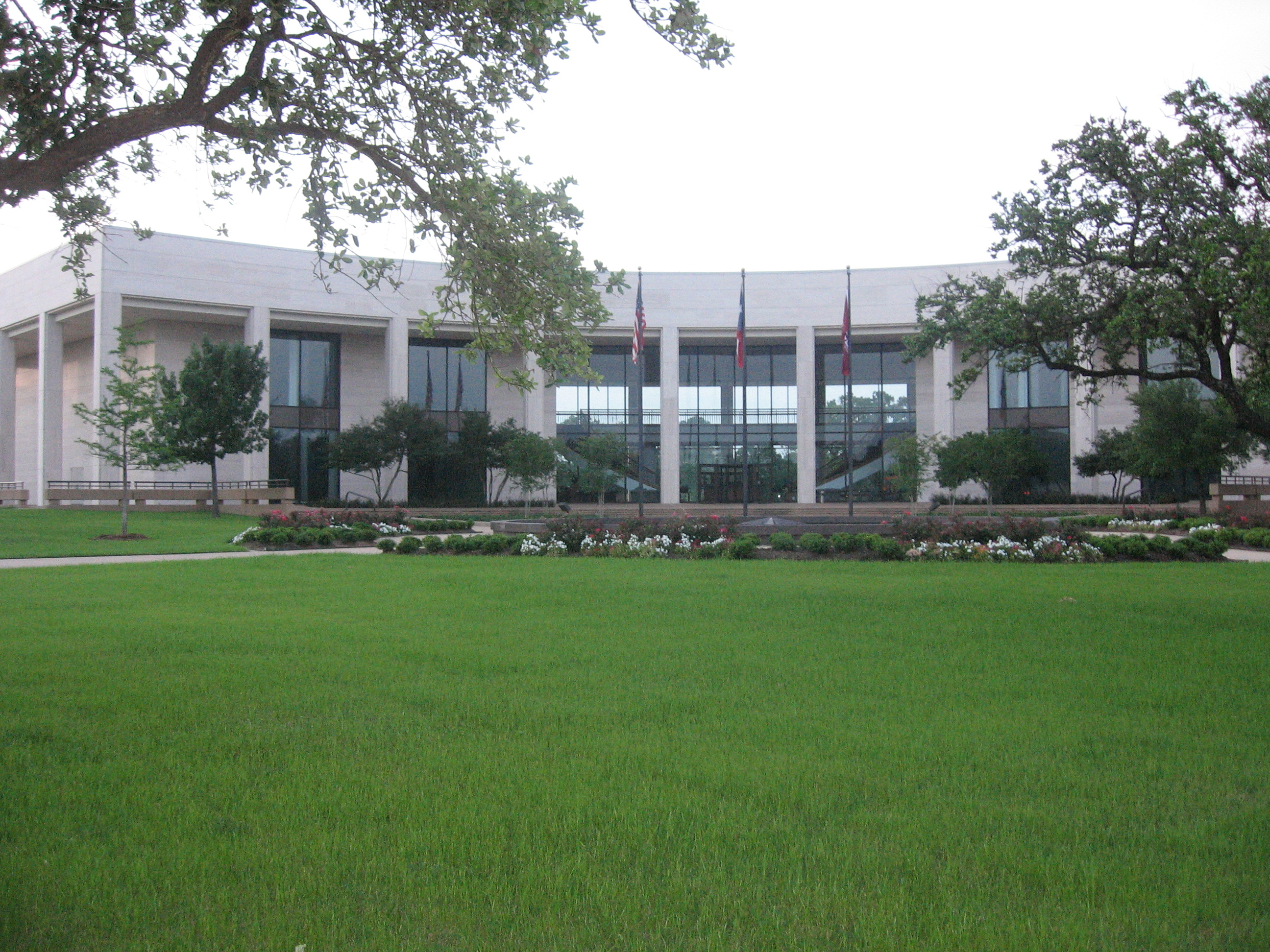
The Clayton W. Williams, Jr., Alumni Center is the home of The Association of Former Students.

With over 508,000 alumni, Texas A&M University has one of the largest alumni groups in America.

Many alumni have attained local, national, and international prominence. Jorge Quiroga and Martin Torrijos have served as heads of state of Bolivia and Panama, respectively. Rick Perry served as the United States secretary of energy and governor of Texas, and ran as a 2012 US presidential candidate. Congressman Louie Gohmert is also a Texas A&M graduate. James Walter (Wally) Brewster Jr. Wally Brewster, served as United States Ambassador to the Dominican Republic from 2013 to 2017

William A. Pailes, Michael E. Fossum, and Steven Swanson became NASA astronauts. Mechanical engineer Holly Ridings became the first female chief flight director at NASA. Phyllis Frye is a residing judge in Houston, Texas, and is the first transgender judge in the United States. In 1903, twin sisters Mary Lockett Hutson Nelson and Sophie Palmer Hutson Rollins were the first women to complete the original college's civil engineering program, but did not receive their degrees until 99 years later, because the college's charter at the time made no provision for female students.

Specimen Medal of Honor displayed at the Memorial Student Center for Horace S. Carswell

Several notable alumni have excelled in sports. These include Heisman Trophy winners John David Crow and Johnny Manziel; Heisman runner-up, legislator, and actor John Kimbrough; and Randy Barnes, indoor/outdoor shot put world-record holder. In popular culture, Robert Earl Keen and Lyle Lovett, who played on the porch of their Northgate home on the university's campus, have become country singers. Alumni in business include Lowry Mays, chairman and CEO of Clear Channel Communications; George P. Mitchell, chairman and CEO of Mitchell Energy and Development Corporation; Khalid A. Al-Falih, president and CEO of Saudi Aramco; and Eduardo Castro-Wright, CEO of Wal-Mart Stores USA.

Many alumni have become leaders in the armed forces. General Bernard Adolph Schriever, the architect of the Air Force's ballistic missile and military space program, became the namesake of Schriever Air Force Base, Colorado. General Michael Moseley is a former chief of staff of the United States Air Force. Seven alumni received the Medal of Honor in World War II: Horace S. Carswell, Jr., Thomas W. Fowler, William Harrell, Lloyd H. Hughes, George D. Keathley, Turney W. Leonard, and Eli L. Whiteley. Clarence E. Sasser received the Medal of Honor for his actions in the Vietnam War prior to enrolling at the university.

=== Notable faculty ===
Notable Texas A&M faculty include eight Nobel Prize laureates, including Derek Barton, Sheldon Glashow, Robert H. Grubbs, Dudley R. Herschbach, Jack Kilby, David Lee, and Vernon L. Smith. In addition, Norman Borlaug, a Nobel Peace Prize laureate, is one of only five people to have won both the Presidential Medal of Freedom and the Congressional Gold Medal. U.S. Senator Phil Gramm taught economics at the university, C++ computer language creator Bjarne Stroustrup taught computer science, and Pulitzer Prize recipient Charles Gordone also taught at Texas A&M. Aviation pioneer Fred Weick did much of his post-war research at Texas A&M. Robert Gates served as president of the university between leaving his post as Director of Central Intelligence and his appointment as the 22nd United States secretary of defense. John E. Sloan, US Army major general, was assigned to Texas A&M as professor of military science and tactics.
