= Texas A&M University College of Education and Human Development =

Academic college in Texas, US

College of Education and Human Development
- Type: Public
- Established: 1969; 57 years ago
- Parent institution: Texas A&M University
- Dean: Michael A. De Miranda
- Location: College Station, Texas
- Website: education.tamu.edu

The Texas A&M University College of Education and Human Development (CEHD) is the academic college of education within Texas A&M University. Founded in 1969, CEHD offers 17 undergraduate degree options, 26 graduate degree options, and seven minors across four departments.

CEHD leads the state of Texas for most total certified teachers at a public institution. It is also among the leading institutions in Texas for producing the highest number of certified teachers in bilingual education, special education and STEM-related fields.

== History ==
Texas A&M University started producing teachers in 1880 when F.F. Bledsoe became the first former student to record his occupation as "teacher" in the Association of Former Students' directory. In 1913, the first course leading to teacher certification was offered in the Department of Horticulture. Eventually, Texas A&M faculty expressed an interest in a school dedicated to teaching and the university established the School of Vocational Teaching in 1924. The School had three departments: Agricultural Education, Industrial Education and Rural Education.

In 1936, the school was dismantled as an administrative unit due to a lack of funding during the Great Depression. As a result, the Department of Rural Education was recreated as the Department of Education within the School of Arts and Sciences.

In 1959, Frank Hubert was selected as dean of the School of Arts and Sciences. With seven years of prior experience at the Texas Education Agency, Hubert helped establish the College of Education as a separate and distinct unit for teachers in 1969 under Texas A&M President James Earl Rudder.

The college quickly brought in faculty from established research universities and began researching how to incorporate technological innovations into education. By 1977, every program was accredited up to the doctoral level by the National Council for Accreditation of Teacher Education.

In 1982, the college created the Dean's Development Council and secured new funding from corporate and private foundations. One of the charter members of the council, astronaut Dick Scobee, established a scholar loan program which directly led to the school becoming a leader in the state for producing the most teachers in the fields of math and science. This expansion of teacher production continued and, by 2020, the school led Texas public institutions for most total certified teachers. In 2002, the college was renamed the College of Education and Human Development to reflect the full scope of academic programs in its departments.

In 2019, the college began the first in-state postsecondary, four-year education program for students with intellectual and developmental disabilities.

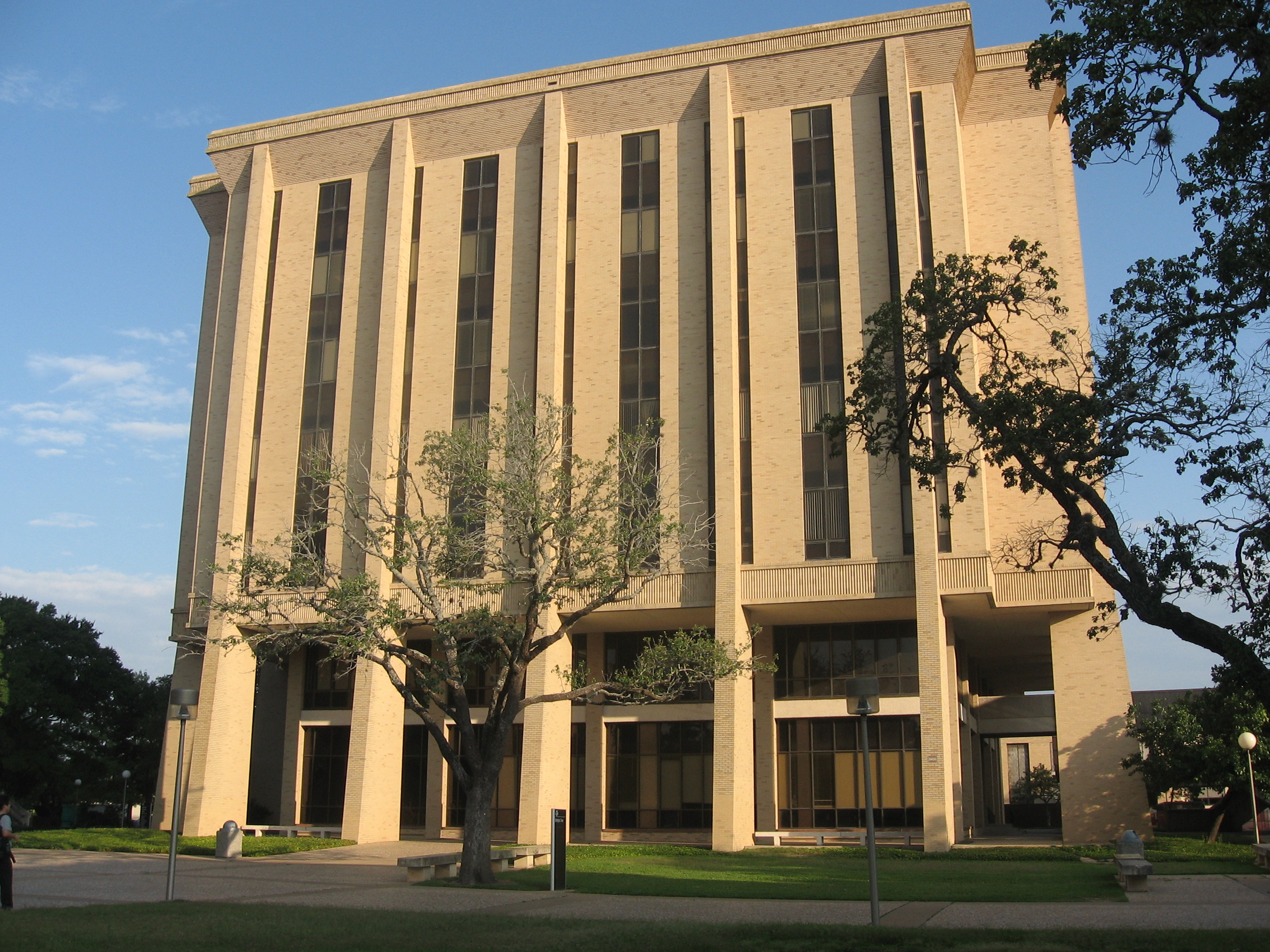

=== Deans ===
Deans	Years served
1969–1979	Frank Hubert
1980–1989	Dean Corrigan
1990–1995	Jane Stallings
1996–2005	Jane Close Conoley
2006–2015	Doug Palmer
2015–2021	Joyce Alexander
2021–Present	Michael A. De Miranda
