= Texas A&M ring =

Class ring of Texas A&M University

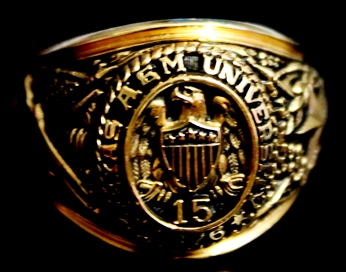
2015 Aggie Ring

The Texas A&M Aggie ring (also known as the Aggie Ring) is a symbol of Texas A&M University and is used to distinguish alumni of Texas A&M. Formally adopted in 1889, the Texas A&M ring design has remained relatively unchanged. The only significant change was the result of renaming the university from "Agricultural and Mechanical College of Texas" to "Texas A&M University" in 1963. The current Aggie Ring was designed by E. C. Jonas in 1894.

== Appearance ==
The top of the ring depicts an eagle and a shield with five stars and thirteen stripes. The eagle denotes agility, power, and the ability to reach great heights. The shield symbolizes the duty to protect Texas A&M's reputation; the five stars within the shield refer to the facets of student development: mind, body, spiritual attainment, emotional poise, and integrity of character, while the thirteen stripes represent the original thirteen colonies and symbolize patriotism. On one side of the ring, there is a five-point star borrowed from the seal of Texas and is circled by oak leaves, symbolizing strength. On the other side of the ring are a cannon, a saber, and a rifle, symbolizing Aggies' preparedness and valor in defending their land. The crossed flags of the United States and Texas symbolize allegiance to both nation and state.

== Traditions ==
2007 Aggie Ring in its original case.

There are several traditions centered around the Aggie ring. One of the most prominent is how students wear their rings at different points in their lives. Current students who have not yet graduated wear their Aggie ring with the class year facing them to signify that their time at Texas A&M University has not yet concluded. Then, at the annual Ring Dance or the graduation ceremony, students turn their rings around in such a way that the class year faces away, symbolizing readiness to "face the world".

A popular unofficial tradition is referred to as the Aggie ring dunk. Students drop their newly acquired Aggie rings in a pitcher of beer, before drinking the beer as fast as possible and catching the Aggie ring between their teeth. It is commonly done as a race or game among friends and peers who receive their Aggie rings around the same time. Students receive their rings on what is known as Aggie Ring Day with their families and friends to celebrate being a part of the Aggie Network. This celebration is held at the Clayton W. Williams, Jr. Alumni Center three times a year.

== Requirements and eligibility ==
For students to receive their Aggie rings during their time at Texas A&M University, they must meet specific qualifications. Current undergraduate students must be in good academic standing with a minimum 2.0 GPA on a 4.0 scale; students must also complete 90 credit hours of course work with a minimum of 45 credit hours earned at Texas A&M University. Graduate students are eligible to receive their Aggie rings once 75% of their graduate course work is completed. If a student's graduate degree requires a thesis, their Aggie ring will be delivered once the thesis has been defended by the specified university deadline. If the thesis has not been defended by this deadline, the student's Aggie ring will be held until this qualification is met. Post-doctorate students can receive their Aggie rings once all formal coursework has been completed with a minimum 3.0 GPA; students must also complete their residency requirement, pass their preliminary exam, and have an approved research proposal on file. If students cannot meet these requirements throughout their time at Texas A&M University, an Aggie ring can be purchased upon graduation.
