= Teens in the Driver Seat =

The Teens in the Driver Seat (TDS) program is a peer-to-peer safety program for young drivers. More than 350 schools in Texas now have active TDS programs in place, and TDS has also become active in high schools in 28 states, with a junior high school program available in Georgia, Nebraska, Texas, and Washington. At least 1.2 million teens participate in the program each year.

Developed and designed in 2002, its mission is to decrease the number of car crashes involving teens by increasing their knowledge of teen driving risks.

Teens in the Driver Seat is part of the Texas Transportation Institute and the Texas A&M University System. It is funded by the Texas Department of Transportation and State Farm Insurance - Texas Zone.

== History ==
Teens in the Driver Seat was founded in 2002, and claims to be the first peer-to-peer program for teens helps them understand the laws and safety of traffic and assess major risk elements. Students are encouraged to spread the project though word-of-mouth to guardians and friends. They use studies from Texas A&M Transportation Institute (TTI) to educate on the dangers of driving.

== Process ==
TDS is made by teens for teens. The direction and content of the TDS program is driven by its target audience - teens. School and community-based teams draw upon the material resources provided by the program, and then (with assistance from TDS staff) develop their own action plans that reflect a teen perspective. The various approaches and tools created and used by active teams (including posters, videos, school activities, etc.) are often shared widely through Teen Team showcase pages on the TDS website.
