= Texas A&M Health =

American medical college in Bryan, Texas, US

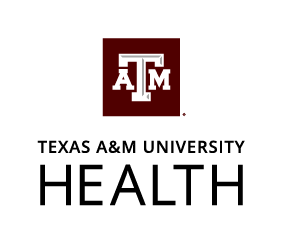
- Established: 1999; 2013 (merged with Texas A&M University)
- Type: Public
- Headquarters: Bryan, Texas, United States
- CEO and Senior Vice President: John Mogford
- CFO and Vice President: Jeff Burton
- Website: health.tamu.edu

Texas A&M Health, also known as Texas A&M University Health, and Texas A&M University Health Science Center, is the medical education component of Texas A&M University, and offers health professions research, education and patient care in dentistry, medicine, nursing, biomedical sciences, public health, and pharmacy on its several campuses. One of the fastest-growing academic health centers in the nation, Texas A&M Health encompasses six schools and numerous centers and institutes. It was established in 1999 as an independent institution of the Texas A&M University System and received accreditation in December 2002 from the Southern Association of Colleges and Schools to award baccalaureate, master's, doctoral and professional degrees. The institution and its colleges merged with Texas A&M University on July 12, 2013.

Its constituent colleges include the Irma Lerma Rangel School of Pharmacy, the School of Dentistry, the School of Engineering Medicine, the School of Medicine, the School of Nursing, and the School of Public Health.

Other components include the A&M Rural and Community Health Institute, the Center for Craniofacial Research & Diagnosis, the Center for Health Organization Transformation, the Center for Population Health and Aging, the Coastal Bend Health Education Center in Corpus Christi, the Global Institute for Hispanic Health, Healthy South Texas, and the Institute of Biosciences and Technology in Houston.

Texas A&M Health offers a variety of bachelor, master, and doctoral degrees in a range of topic areas including dentistry, public health, biomedical sciences, pharmacy and nursing.

Texas A&M Health Schools
School	Year founded
Irma Lerma Rangel School of Pharmacy	2006
School of Dentistry	1996
School of Engineering Medicine	2021
School of Medicine	1977
School of Nursing	2008
School of Public Health	1924

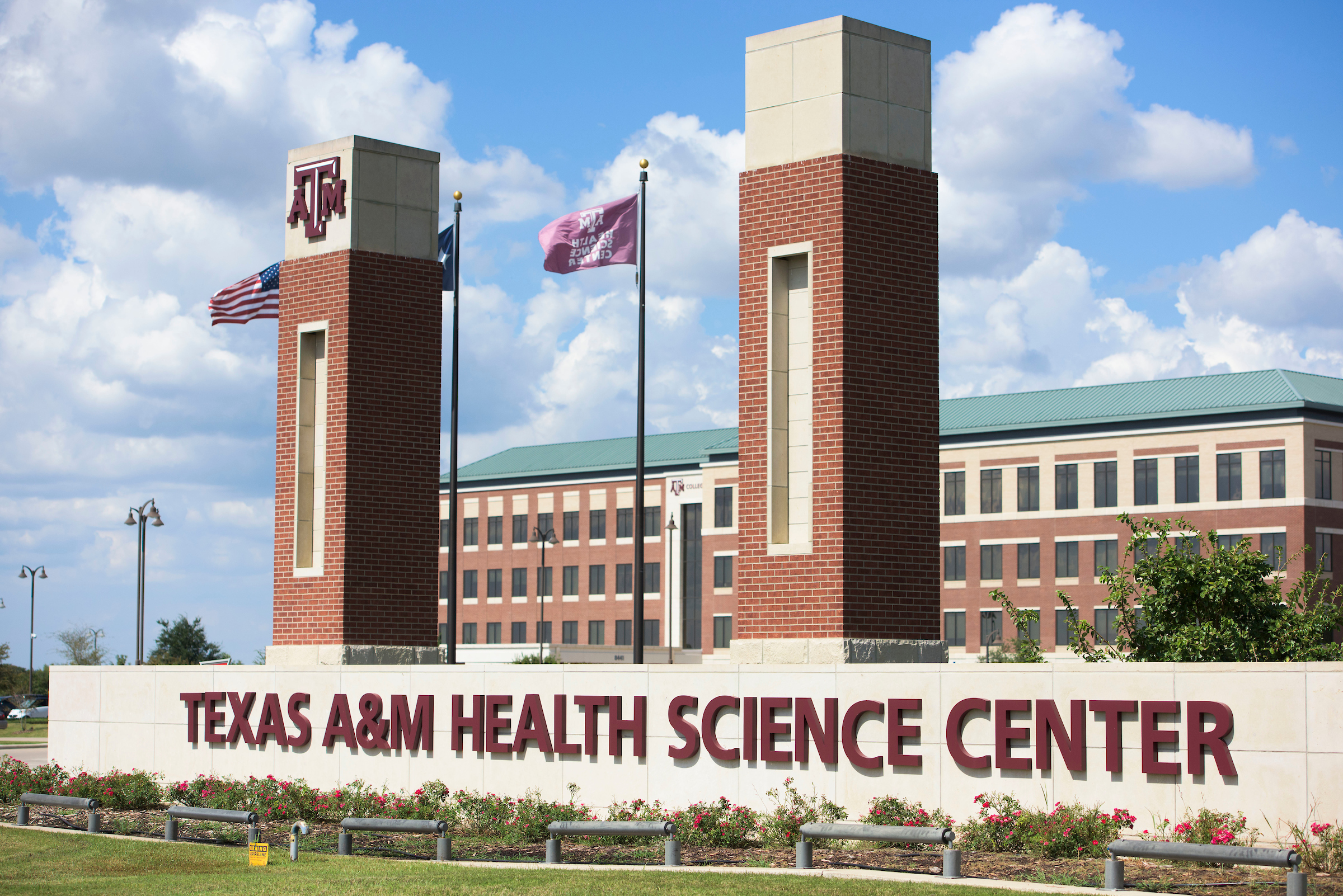
Texas A&M University Health Science Center - Bryan Campus

== Degrees offered ==
=== Texas A&M University School of Dentistry ===
- Bachelor of Science (BS), Dental Hygiene
- Master of Science (MS), Oral Biology
- Doctor of Philosophy (PhD), Oral Biology
- Doctor of Dental Surgery (DDS)

=== Texas A&M University School of Engineering Medicine (EnMed) ===
- Engineering Medicine (MD+ME) (Houston)

=== Texas A&M University School of Medicine ===
- Doctor of Medicine (MD) (Bryan-College Station, Dallas, Houston, Round Rock, Temple)
- Medical Science (PhD) (Bryan-College Station, Houston)
- Medical Science (MS) (Bryan-College Station)
- Education for Healthcare Professionals (MS) (Online)
- Education for Healthcare Professionals certificate (Online)
- Doctor of Medicine/Doctorate of Philosophy (MD/PhD) (Bryan-College Station, Houston)
- MD + Business Administration (MD+MBA) (Bryan-College Station)
- MD + Master of Public Health (MD+MPH) (Bryan-College Station)
- MD + Master of Science (MD+MS) (Bryan-College Station, Houston)
- MD + Master of Science in Education for Healthcare Professionals (MD+EDHP) degree (Online)
- MD + Science and Technology Journalism (MD+STJR) (Bryan-College Station)

=== Texas A&M University School of Nursing ===
- Traditional (BSN)
- Second Degree (BSN)
- RN to BSN
- Nursing Education (MSN)
- Family Nurse Practitioner (MSN)
- Forensic Nursing (MSN)
- Doctor of Nursing Practice (DNP)
- Graduate Certificate in Forensic Health Care
- Post-Grad Certificate in Psychiatric Mental Health Nurse Practitioner (PMHNP)

=== Texas A&M University Irma Lerma Rangel School of Pharmacy ===
- Doctor of Pharmacy (PharmD)
- Pharmacy + Business Administration (PharmD + MBA)
- Doctor of Philosophy in Pharmaceutical Sciences (PhD)

=== Texas A&M University School of Public Health ===
- Bachelor of Science in Public Health (BSPH) degree (Bryan-College Station, McAllen)
  - Minor in Public Health
  - Minor in Occupational Safety and Health
- Master of Public Health (MPH) (Bryan-College Station, McAllen, Online)
- Master of Health Administration Resident Track (MHA) (Bryan-College Station)
- Master of Health Administration Executive Track (MHA) (Houston)
- Doctor of Public Health (DrPH) (Bryan-College Station)
- Doctor of Philosophy in Health Services Research (PhD) (Bryan-College Station)
- Undergraduate dual degree programs
  - Bachelor of Science and Master of Public Health (BS/MPH) (Bryan-College Station)
  - Bachelor of Science Interdisciplinary Engineering and Master of Public Health in Occupational Safety (Bryan-College Station)
  - Bachelor of Science Industrial Engineering and Master of Public Health in Occupational Safety (Bryan-College Station)
- Graduate dual degree programs
  - Master of International Affairs/Master of Public Health (MIA/MPH) (Bryan-College Station)
  - Doctor of Medicine/Master of Public Health (MD+MPH) (Bryan-College Station)
  - Juris Doctor/Master of Public Health in Health Policy and Management (JD/MPH) (Bryan-College Station)
- Global Health Certificate (Bryan-College Station)
- Maternal and Child Health Certificate (Bryan-College Station)
- Health Systems Management Certificate (Bryan-College Station)
