= Gibb Gilchrist =

American academic administrator (1887–1972)

1st Chancellor of the Texas A&M University System
- In office 1948–1953

President of the Agricultural and Mechanical College of Texas
- In office May 27, 1944 – September 1, 1948
- Preceded by: Frank Cleveland Bolton (Acting)
- Succeeded by: Frank Cleveland Bolton

Personal details
- Born: December 23, 1887 Wills Point, Texas
- Died: May 12, 1972 (aged 84) College Station, Texas
- Education: University of Texas at Austin
- Profession: Civil engineer

Gibb Gilchrist (December 23, 1887 – May 12, 1972) was an American engineer, highway development expert and academic administrator. Gilchrist served as a Texas state highway engineer, president of the Agricultural and Mechanical College of Texas and the first chancellor of the Texas A&M University System. Gilchrist received numerous awards and honorary degrees. He is the namesake for several transportation-related entities.

== Biography ==
Gibb Gilchrist was born in Wills Point, Texas, on December 23, 1887. He briefly attended Southwestern University and graduated from the University of Texas at Austin with a civil engineering degree. Gilchrist spent several years with the Santa Fe Railroad, where he rebuilt the Galveston County rail line between High Island and Port Bolivar that had been destroyed in the area's 1915 hurricane. Gilchrist served in World War I and became a captain of engineers. He went to work for the state highway department in Texas after the war. He married Vesta Weaver in 1920. They had one child, Henry Gilchrist, who became a Dallas attorney.

In 1924, Gilchrist was named state highway engineer. He resigned the next year, shortly after Ma Ferguson was replaced roads advocate Pat Neff as Texas governor. He became an engineering consultant to private business but was again appointed state highway engineer in 1928. Under his direction, a system of roadside rest stops was constructed throughout the state. He resigned in 1936 after Governor James V. Allred used state highway funds to finance an assistance program for the elderly.

In 1937, Gilchrist became the dean of engineering at Texas A&M University. He was appointed university president in 1944. During his presidency, new rules were issued against student hazing, which prompted some student cadets to call for Gilchrist's dismissal. He became the first chancellor of the Texas A&M College System in 1948. He served in that capacity until 1953. He spent his retirement in College Station. Gilchrist died in College Station on May 12, 1972.

== Honors and awards ==
Gilchrist was awarded an honorary Doctor of Science degree from Austin College in 1939. He was awarded honorary Doctor of Laws degrees from Baylor University and Southwestern University in 1946. Gilchrist was a Mason and he served as Grand Master of the Grand Lodge of Texas in 1952.

== Legacy ==
The community of Gilchrist, Texas, is named for him. The Gibb Gilchrist is one of the vessels in the Galveston Island Ferry fleet. A street in College Station, Texas is named after the Gilchrist family. The Gibb Gilchrist Building of the Texas Transportation Institute is located in Texas A&M's Research Park. The Texas Department of Transportation (TxDOT) issues the Gibb Gilchrist Award to recognize outstanding service within TxDOT.

In 2000, Texas A&M removed a photograph of Gilchrist that had hung at the university because Gilchrist was pictured in front of Confederate Army general Robert E. Lee. In 2002, the picture was returned to the Gibb Gilchrist Building, but it was placed in a first-floor conference room rather than its former location in the building's lobby.

== See also ==
- List of Texas A&M University presidents
