= Hanadi Salem =

Egyptian Academician

- Citizenship: Egyptian
- Education: American University in Cairo (BSc, MSc) Texas A&M University (PhD)
- Occupation: Professor of Mechanical Engineering
- Employer(s): American University in Cairo, Egypt
- Awards: Fellow of the African Academy of Sciences

Hanadi Salem is an Egyptian professor of mechanical engineering, specialising in materials and manufacturing. She serves as chair of the Department of Mechanical Engineering at the American University in Cairo (AUC) and was elected as a fellow of the African Academy of Sciences in 2024.

== Early life and education ==
Hanadi earned both a BSc in 1983 and a MSc in 1987 from the American University in Cairo in Materials Science and Engineering. In 1997, she completed her PhD in Mechanical Engineering from Texas A&M University with specialization in materials and manufacturing.

== Career ==
She joined the AUC's Department of Mechanical Engineering in 1999 and rose to become a full professor in 2010. She has chaired the department since 2020. Hanadi co-founded the Yousef Jameel Science and Technology Research Centre (YJSTRC) in 2003, founded AUC's Nanotechnology Masters program in 2009 and helped to establish the Doctorate of Science and Engineering at AUC.

She has also served in university governance as the first elected chair of the AUC university senate.

As the director of AUC's Nanotechnology program, her work supported nanotechnology graduates and translational projects focused on biomaterials and structural applications. She also acts as AUC's representative to the Egyptian National Nanotechnology Network.

== Awards and recognition ==
Hanadi was elected in 2024 as a fellow of the African Academy of Sciences.

== Selected publications ==
- El-Garaihy, W. H.; Fouad, D. M.; Salem, H. G. (2018). "Multi-channel Spiral Twist Extrusion (MCSTE): A Novel Severe Plastic Deformation Technique for Grain Refinement". Metallurgical and Materials Transactions A. 49 (7): 2854–2864. doi:10.1007/s11661-018-4621-4. ISSN 1073-5623.
- Salem, Hanadi G; Reynolds, Anthony P; Lyons, Jed S (2002). "Microstructure and retention of superplasticity of friction stir welded superplastic 2095 sheet". Scripta Materialia. 46 (5): 337–342. doi:10.1016/S1359-6462(01)01246-5.
- Salem, Hanadi G.; El-Eskandarany, Sherif; Kandil, Amr; Abdul Fattah, Hassan (2009). "Bulk Behavior of Ball Milled AA2124 Nanostructured Powders Reinforced with TiC". Journal of Nanomaterials. 2009 (1). doi:10.1155/2009/479185. ISSN 1687-4110.
- Abdelfattah, Khaled B.; Abbas, Marwa A.; El-Garaihy, Waleed H.; Mohamed, Adel M. A.; Salem, Hanadi G. (2025-02-03). "Corrosion and degradation behavior of MCSTE-Processed AZ31 magnesium alloy". Scientific Reports. 15 (1). doi:10.1038/s41598-025-88161-7. ISSN 2045-2322. PMC 11791200. PMID 39900667.
