= Jay Seibert =

Jay S. Seibert (August 18, 1928 – December 20, 1997) was a board-certified American periodontist who served as professor in and chairman of the periodontics department at the University of Pennsylvania School of Dental Medicine.

== Education ==
Seibert was born in Livingston, New Jersey, and raised in nearby West Orange, graduating from the West Orange public high school. After matriculating from Bucknell University in Lewisburg, Pennsylvania, he attended the University of Pennsylvania School of Dental Medicine, graduating in 1953. He completed his training in periodontics at Baylor College of Dentistry in Dallas, Texas, in 1960.

== Career ==
Seibert served in the US Army dental corps from 1953 to 1973, retiring as a full colonel from the Walter Reed Army Medical Center in Washington, D.C., and having held the position of chief of periodontics from 1967 until his retirement in 1973.

Seibert held the position of chairman of the periodontal department from 1973 to 1975 and then again from 1979 to 1982, and also served as the associate dean for academic affairs and director of the predoctoral program from 1975 to 1979 and then again from 1982 to 1984. He also led the postdoctoral periodontal department from 1979 to 1981 and then again from 1990 until he died in 1997.

He contributed to dental literature in the form of textbook chapters and independent academic research papers. In 1983, he published a classification system for deficiencies of the alveolar ridges.

Seibert died of December 20, 1997 of complications due to amyotrophic lateral sclerosis.
