= Texas A&M University System =

State university system in College Station, Texas, U.S.

Coordinates: 30°36′37″N 96°20′37″W

The Texas A&M University System
- Type: State university system
- Established: 1948
- Endowment: $20.38 billion (FY2024)
- Chancellor: Glenn Hegar
- Students: 164,905
- Location: College Station, Texas, United States
- Website: tamus.edu

The Texas A&M University System is a state university system in Texas and is one of the state's seven independent university systems. The Texas A&M University System is one of the largest systems of higher education in the United States, with a budget of $7.3 billion. Through a statewide network of 12 universities, eight state agencies, nine other entities, and participation in two joint ventures involved in nuclear activities, the Texas A&M System educates nearly 170,000 students and makes more than 22 million additional educational contacts through service and outreach programs each year. System-wide, research and development expenditures exceeded $1.6 billion and helped drive the state's economy.

The system's flagship institution is Texas A&M University in College Station, Texas, United States. The letters "A&M" (originally A.M.C. for "agricultural and mechanical college") are retained to honor the university's former designation.

Texas A&M University System Locations.

== History ==
The A&M System was established in 1948. Four colleges and five state agencies (those having responsibilities for agricultural and engineering research and extension services) were placed under System administration. Over time, nine additional colleges and universities were added to the System (Arlington State College, a charter System member, was transferred in 1965 to the University of Texas System and renamed University of Texas at Arlington) along with three additional state agencies and other entities.

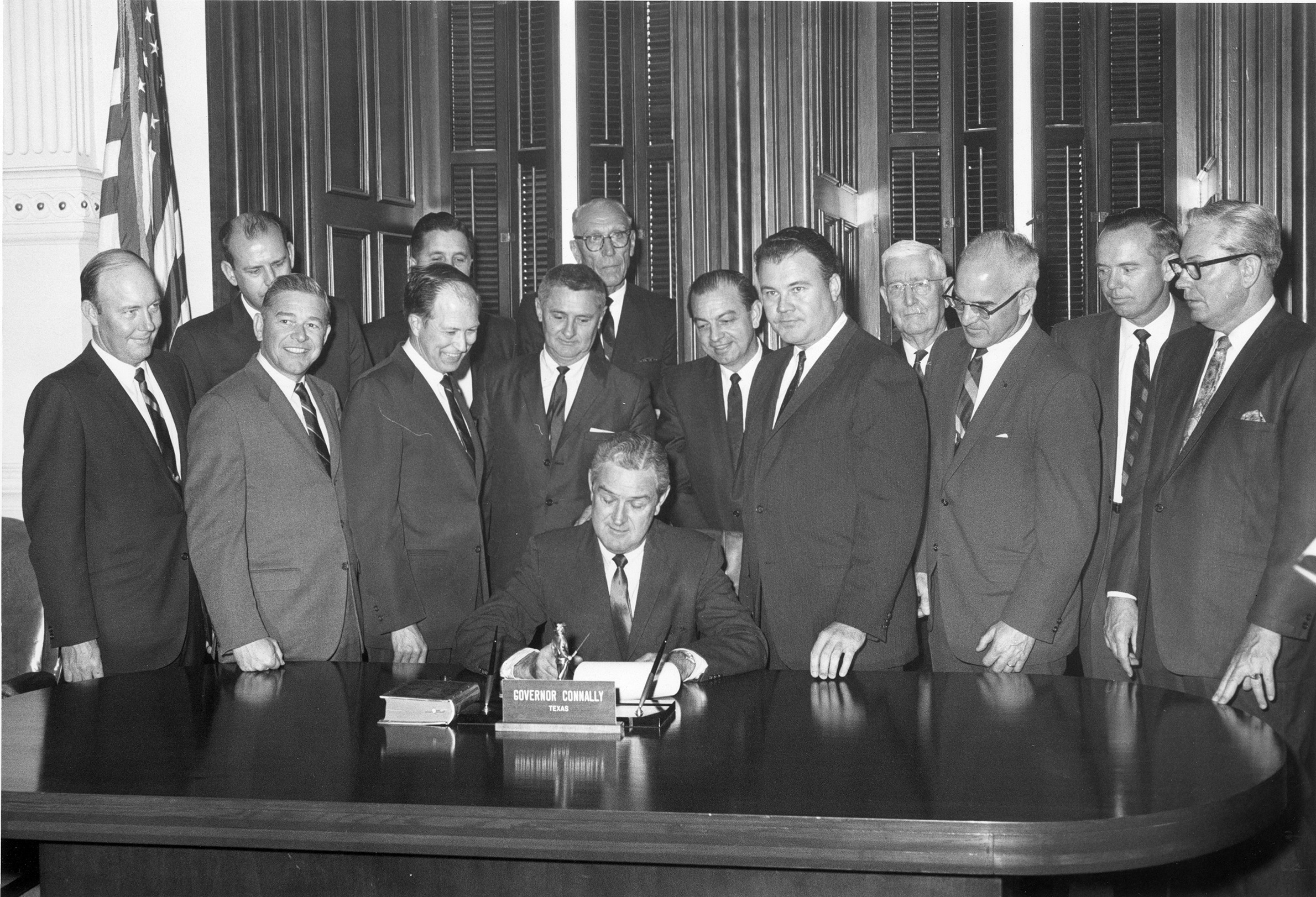
Gov. John Connally signing the bill that separated Arlington State College from the Texas A&M University System in 1965

== Component institutions ==
The founding member of the A&M System is Texas A&M University, established in 1876. Prairie View A&M, also established in 1876, is an HBCU. The A&M System, like all schools in Texas, was racially segregated by state law from its founding until the 1960s. Many of the member universities and agencies joined the A&M System decades after being established.

University	Location (Note: All locations are within the State of Texas.) (population)	Statistical area (population)	Founded	Carnegie Classification	Enrollment (Fall 2025)	President	Joined TAMU System	Nickname	Athletic conference
Texas A&M University (flagship)	College Station (120,511)	Bryan–College Station (Note: Metropolitan area.) (268,248)	1876	Doctoral/Research (R1)	72,289	Susan Ballabina	1948	Aggies	SEC (NCAA D-I FBS)
East Texas A&M University	Commerce (9,090)	Dallas–Fort Worth (7,637,387)	1889	Doctoral/Research (R2)	13,565	Mark J. Rudin	1996	Lions	Southland (NCAA D-I FCS)
Prairie View A&M University (HBCU)	Prairie View (8,184)	Greater Houston (7,122,240)	1876	Doctoral/Research (R2)	10,295	Tomikia P. LeGrande	1948	Panthers	SWAC (NCAA D-I FCS)
Tarleton State University	Stephenville (20,847)	Stephenville (Note: Micropolitan area.) (42,545)	1899	Doctoral/Research (R2)	20,939	James L. Hurley	1948	Texans (Note: Tarleton State's women's athletic sports programs were the "TexAnns" until after the 2018–19 school year.)	UAC (NCAA D-I FCS)
Texas A&M University–Corpus Christi	Corpus Christi (317,863)	Corpus Christi (445,823)	1947	Doctoral/Research (R2)	11,398	Kelly M. Miller	1989	Islanders	Southland (NCAA D-I) (Note: Non-football school.)
Texas A&M University–San Antonio	San Antonio (1,434,625)	Greater San Antonio (2,558,143)	2009	Master's	7,757	Salvador Hector Ochoa	2009	Jaguars	RRAC (NAIA)
Texas A&M University–Kingsville	Kingsville (25,402)	Kingsville (31,040)	1925	Doctoral/Research (R2)	6,876	Robert Vela	1989	Javelinas	Lone Star (NCAA D-II)
Texas A&M International University	Laredo (255,205)	Laredo (267,114); Laredo–Nuevo Laredo (706,245)	1969	Doctoral/Professional	9,073	Christopher Maynard	1989	Dustdevils	Lone Star (NCAA D-II)
West Texas A&M University	Canyon (14,836)	Amarillo (268,691)	1910	Master's	9,271	Walter Wendler	1990	Buffaloes	Lone Star (NCAA D-II)
Texas A&M University–Central Texas	Killeen (153,095)	Killeen–Temple (475,367)	1999	Master's	2,516	Marc Nigliazzo	2000	Warriors (no athletics)	n/a
Texas A&M University–Texarkana	Texarkana (36,193)	Texarkana (148,838)	1971	Master's	2,608	Ross Alexander	1996	Eagles	RRAC (NAIA)
Texas A&M University–Victoria	Victoria (65,534)	Victoria (91,520)	1973	Master's	3,256	Christian Hardigree	2025	Jaguars	RRAC (NAIA)

=== Texas A&M Health ===
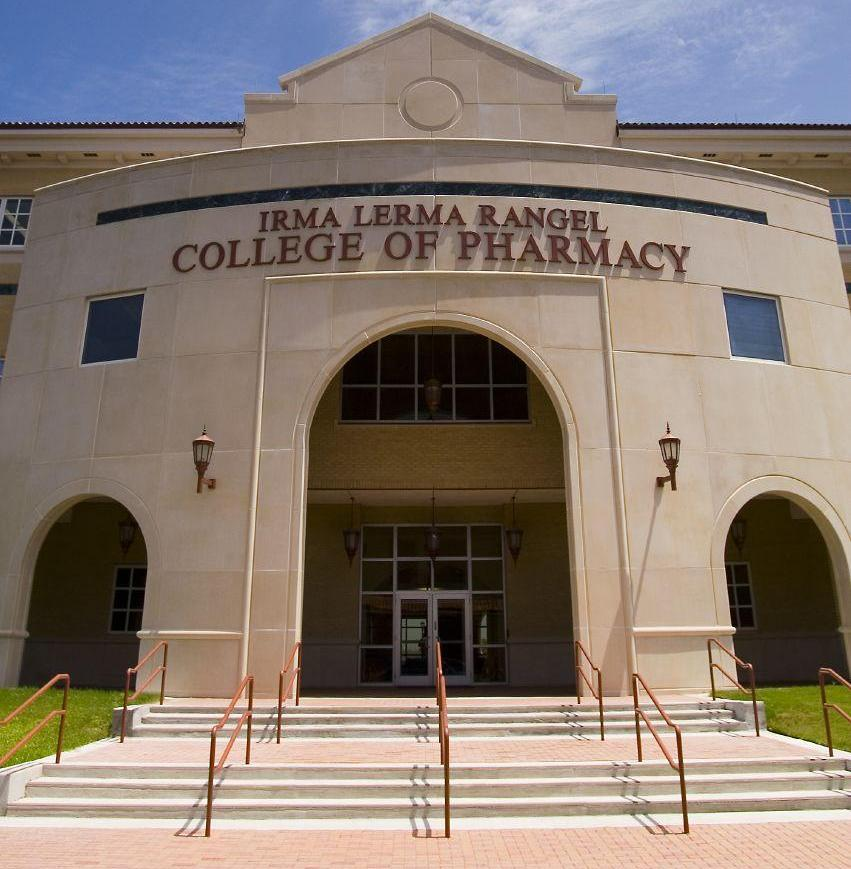
Texas A&M University Irma Lerma Rangel College of Pharmacy in Kingsville

Established in 1999, as the Texas A&M Health Science Center, Texas A&M Health is the medical education component of Texas A&M University and reaches across all parts of Texas through its institutions: Texas A&M University College of Dentistry at Dallas; the College of Medicine at College Station, Temple, Dallas, Round Rock, and Houston; the Graduate School of Biomedical Sciences at Dallas, College Station and Houston; the School of Engineering Medicine and Institute of Biosciences and Technology in Houston; the School of Public Health at College Station and McAllen; and the Irma Lerma Rangel College of Pharmacy in College Station and Kingsville. Southern regions of the state also are further served by the Coastal Bend Health Education Center, which covers the 19-county region surrounding Corpus Christi and Kingsville, and the South Texas Center at McAllen.

Texas A&M Health received full accreditation in December 2002 from the Southern Association of Colleges and Schools to award baccalaureate, master's, doctoral and professional degrees. Its components are accredited by accrediting organizations specific to their areas.

The Health Science Center in 2013 was merged into Texas A&M University proper and is no longer an independent institution. It was renamed Texas A&M Health.

==== Academic units ====
- Institute of Biosciences and Technology
- Texas A&M University School of Dentistry
- Texas A&M University School of Engineering Medicine
- Texas A&M University School of Law
- Texas A&M University School of Medicine
- Texas A&M University School of Nursing
- Texas A&M Health Graduate School of Biomedical Sciences
- Texas A&M University Irma Lerma Rangel School of Pharmacy
- Texas A&M University School of Public Health
- Texas A&M–Fort Worth

==== Regional centers ====
- Texas A&M Health Science Center Coastal Bend Health Education Center
- Texas A&M Health Science Center South Texas Center

== Agencies ==
With a direct presence in nearly all the 254 Texas counties, A&M System agencies offer research and service to the state's citizens. The agencies focus on addressing and improving the social, economic, educational, health and environmental conditions of Texans.

- Texas A&M AgriLife Research
- Texas A&M AgriLife Extension Service
- Texas A&M Engineering Experiment Station (TEES)
- Texas A&M Engineering Extension Service (TEEX)
- Texas A&M Forest Service
- Texas A&M Transportation Institute
- Texas A&M Veterinary Medical Diagnostic Laboratory
- Texas Division of Emergency Management (TDEM)

TDEM is the only state agency under the Texas A&M System not to bear the "A&M" name as it is the most recent to be added to the system, transferred from the Texas Department of Public Safety to TAMUS in 2019.

== Other Entities ==
In addition to the listed universities and state agencies, the following entities are also under System administration:

- Texas A&M RELLIS Innovation & Tech Campus
- Texas A&M RELLIS Academic Alliance
- Texas A&M - Fort Worth
- Texas A&M Innovation
- Nuclear Security Office
- Bush Combat Development Complex
- Texas A&M Semiconductor Institute
- Research Security Office
- Center for Applied Communications and Networks

== Joint Venture Memberships ==
The System is a member of two joint ventures, both having significant involvement in nuclear research and security:

- Triad National Security, LLC (Triad), which manages and operates the Los Alamos National Laboratory
- PanTexas Deterrence, LLC (PD), which manages and operates the Pantex plant

== Governance and administration ==
The System is governed by a nine-member Board of Regents. Each member is appointed by the Governor of Texas for a six-year term and the terms overlap (all terms end on February 1 in odd-numbered years and in those years 1/3 of the regents' terms expire, though a regent can be nominated for another subsequent term).

In addition, a tenth "student regent" (non-voting member) is appointed by the Governor for a one-year term.

The responsibilities of the Texas A&M University System Board of Regents are to:

- Oversee the administration and set policy direction for the System's 12 universities, eight state agencies, and other System components;
- Ensure a quality undergraduate and graduate education experience for all students;
- Promote academic research and technology to benefit the state of Texas and the nation;
- Disseminate programs of the A&M System across the state through outreach and public service efforts; and
- Support the state legislative and higher education leadership to position Texas at the forefront of higher education nationally.

Additionally, the Texas A&M University System is a member of the Alliance for Biosecurity, a public-private coalition that "advocates for public policies and funding to support the rapid development, production, stockpiling, and distribution of critically needed medical countermeasures".

== Chancellors ==
The following persons have served as chancellor of Texas A&M University System:

No.	Portrait	President	Term start	Term end	Ref.
1		Gibb Gilchrist	September 1948	August 1953	
2		Marion Thomas Harrington	September 1953	August 1965	
3		James Earl Rudder	August 1965	March 1970	
4		Jack Kenny Williams	September 1970	January 1979	
5		Frank W.R. Hubert	October 1979	June 1982	
6		Arthur Hansen	July 1982	June 1986	
7		Perry L. Adkisson	June 1986	December 1990	
8		Herbert H. Richardson	September 1991	August 1993	
9		William H. Mobley	September 1993	July 31, 1994	
10		Barry B. Thompson	August 1, 1994	July 31, 1999	
11		Howard D. Graves	August 1, 1999	August 31, 2003 (Note: Resigned a few days before he died from cancer.)	
interim		A. Benton Cocanougher	September 1, 2003	November 3, 2004	
12		Robert McTeer	November 4, 2004	November 21, 2006	
13		Michael D. McKinney	November 22, 2006	June 30, 2011	
interim		Jay Kimbrough	July 1, 2011	September 5, 2011	
14		John Sharp	September 6, 2011	June 30, 2025	
15		Glenn Hegar	July 1, 2025	Present	

Table notes:
