= Institute of Biosciences and Technology =

US research institute

Coordinates: 29°42′21″N 95°24′26″W

- Abbreviation: IBT
- Location: Houston, Texas
- Key people: Dr. Cheryl Lyn Walker (Current Director); Dr. Robert Schwartz( Director, 2006-2009); Dr. Richard Finnell( Director, 2001-2005); Dr. Fuller W. Bazer( Director, 1994-2001); Dr. Robert D. Wells( Director, 1990-1994); Mr. David Eller; Dr. Richard Wainerdi; Dr. Charles Arntzen; Ray Bowen; Dr. David Low; Dr. David Carlson

The Texas A&M Institute of Biosciences and Technology (IBT), a component of Texas A&M Health, and The Texas A&M University System, is located in the world's largest medical center, the Texas Medical Center, in Houston, Texas. The institute provides a bridge between Texas A&M University System scientists and other institutions' researchers working in the Texas Medical Center and the biomedical and biotechnology research community in Houston. It emphasizes collaboration between member scientists and others working in all the fields of the biosciences and biotechnology. IBT encourages its scientists to transfer discoveries made in their laboratories to the clinic and marketplace.

== History ==
The IBT was first established as part of the Texas A&M University System with the broad goal to expand biotechnology in the system. Plans for an institutional campus in Houston came to fruition in 1986 under Mr. David Eller (Chairman of the Texas A&M University System Board of Regents) and Dr. Richard Wainerdi (Chairman and CEO of the Texas Medical Center). Dr. Eugene G. Sander, head of the Department of Biochemistry and Biophysics in the Texas A&M College of Agriculture and Life Sciences (COALS) was named first director of the institute. The Robert A. Welch Foundation endowed a $1 million Robert A. Welch Chair in 1990.

In 1988 the institute administration was moved from the Texas A&M University System to the Texas A&M University under the leadership of Dr. Charles Arntzen, Vice Chancellor of Agriculture and Dean of the College of Life Sciences and Agriculture (COALS). Arntzen secured a grant from the United States Department of Agriculture for $12.5 million and other private donations including one from Texas oilman Albert B. Alkek to build the Albert B. Alkek Institute of Biosciences and Technology Building in the Texas Medical Center at a cost of $21.5 million. The 11-story building stands on the former site of the historic Shamrock Hotel. Under Arntzen's leadership, Centers for Animal Genetics, Advanced Invertebrate Molecular Sciences and Biotechnology Policy and Ethics were established and funding secured for additional endowed chairs from the Allen, John S. Dunn, and Neva and Wesley West (see Wesley West) Foundations. In 1990, he recruited Dr. Robert D. Wells into the Welch Chair as Chairman of the Department of Biochemistry and Biophysics (COALS) and Director of the IBT. Under Wells directorship (1990–1994), Centers for Genome Research, Macromolecular Design, Extracellular Matrix Biology, Crop Biotechnology, Animal Biotechnology, Genome Informatics and Cancer Biology were established.

Dr. Fuller W. Bazer was Director from 1994 to 2001. Under the Bazer administration by agreement between the Texas A&M University President Ray Bowen and The University of Texas Health Science Center at Houston President Dr. David Low, the University of Texas' Institute of Molecular Medicine for Prevention of Human Disease (Hans Muller-Eberhard, Director) was established on two floors of the IBT building. During this period similar cooperative efforts between Texas A&M University and The University of Texas Health Science Center at Houston resulted in acceptance of IBT Texas A&M faculty into the UT Graduate School of Biomedical Sciences. The building became a hub for the Texas GigaPop and similar high speed, broad bandwidth internet activities of the Texas A&M University's Academy for Advanced Telecommunications and Distance Learning. In 1997 the IBT became a college level unit of the newly established Texas A&M Health Science Center.

Dr. Richard Finnell served as director 2001-2005 under whose leadership the Texas Institute for Genomic Medicine (TIGM) was established. Dr. Robert Schwartz served as director for 2006–2009. In 2007 a self-study called for a strategic plan in which the IBT would be the founding basic research element of a broader Texas A&M Health Science Center Houston Campus representing all components of the Health Science Center in Houston. Dr. David Carlson, the Texas A&M Health Science Center Vice President of Research and Graduate Studies served as the interim IBT Director 2009–2011. In 2011 Dr. Cheryl Lyn Walker was appointed as the current Director of IBT.

== Organizational structure ==
Under its college level status within Texas A&M Health, the IBT consists of thematic Centers (departments) led by a Center Director and tenured and tenure-track faculty, research track faculty and associate and adjunct faculty.

The approximately $10 million operating budget of the IBT consists of about 30% state funds, 50% federal grants and 20% private sources. Current Centers include Cancer and Stem Cell Biology (formerly Cancer Biology and Nutrition), Epigenetics and Disease Prevention, Environmental and Genetic Medicine, Infectious and Inflammatory Diseases (formerly Extracellular matrix Biology) and Translational Cancer Research.

The IBT Graduate Program consists of students from the Texas A&M Health Science Center Graduate School of Biomedical Sciences, other Texas A&M System programs, The University of Texas Health Science Center at Houston Graduate School of Biomedical Sciences and other programs in Texas Medical Center institutions in which faculty have joint graduate faculty appointments. Students do research in IBT laboratories while taking formal classroom instruction at other Texas Medical Center institutions.

In addition to the IBT, the Texas A&M Health Science Center Alkek Building hosts the Houston division of the Texas Institute for Genomic Medicine, representatives of the Texas A&M Health Science Center College of Medicine, School of Rural Public Health and Baylor College of Dentistry. Two floors of the building are dedicated to a partnership with the Department of Medicine of The University of Texas M. D. Anderson Cancer Center.
