= Irma Lerma Rangel College of Pharmacy =

Pharmacy school of Texas A&M University

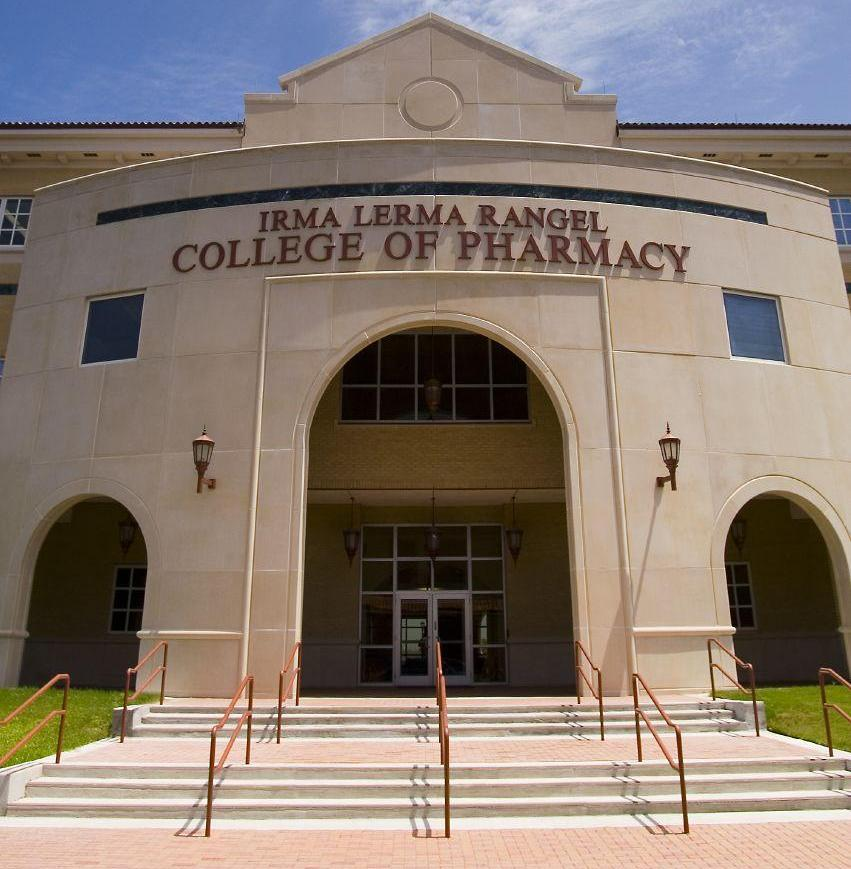
- Motto: Reimagining Pharmacy – Transforming Lives
- Type: Public
- Established: 2006; 20 years ago
- Parent institution: Texas A&M University
- Dean: Mansoor Khan (Interim)
- Location: College Station, Texas & Kingsville, Texas
- Campus: Midsize City & Suburban
- Website: pharmacy.tamu.edu

The Texas A&M University Irma Lerma Rangel College of Pharmacy, located on the campuses of Texas A&M University and Texas A&M University–Kingsville, is the pharmacy school of Texas A&M University and is a component of Texas A&M Health.

The school is named after Irma Lerma Rangel, the former member of the Texas House of Representatives.

In 2001, House Bill 1601 was passed, which established its creation as the first professional pharmacy school in South Texas.

The first class of more than 70 students began studies in August 2006 in a 63,000-square-foot (5,900 m^{2}), $14.5-million facility. The inaugural class graduated on May 15, 2010. The 2009-2010 year was the first year to have all four classes enrolled.

In the fall of 2014, Texas A&M University in College Station started its pharmacy program and admitted an inaugural class of 33 student pharmacists to the Doctorate of Pharmacy program.

Effective September 1st, 2017, Texas Education Code § 89.051 requires the board of regents to have a pharmacy college as a component of the Texas A&M Health Science Center. It also requires "Irma Rangel" to be part of its official name, and the "primary building in which the school is operated shall be located in Kleberg County".

In 2022, Texas A&M University President M. Katherine Banks, implemented university-wide administrative restructuring that involved several changes to academic unit names and branding. Effective September 1, 2022, the Texas A&M pharmacy unit was renamed the Texas A&M University Irma Lerma Rangel School of Pharmacy.

They are said to be adding pharmacy technician program to the school in 2024 to address the shortage in Texas.
