= Texas A&M Transportation Institute =

Research institute

Texas A&M Transportation Institute (TTI)

Agency overview
- Formed: 1950
- Type: Agency of higher education
- Jurisdiction: State of Texas
- Headquarters: 1111 RELLIS Parkway, Bryan, Texas; 30°38′49″N 96°28′21″W
- Motto: Saving Lives, Time and Resources
- Employees: ~700 (2026)
- Annual budget: $66.9 million (FY 2019)
- Agency executive: Gregory D. Winfree, J.D., Director
- Parent agency: Texas A&M University System
- Website: tti.tamu.edu

The Texas A&M Transportation Institute (TTI) in Bryan/College Station, Texas is a transportation research agency. The institute was created in 1950, primarily in response to the needs of the Texas Highway Department (now the Texas Department of Transportation). TTI is a state agency and a member of the Texas A&M University System.

With more than 350 professional researchers, more than 200 public and private sponsors, TTI works on approximately 700 research projects annually, resulting in more than 140 million dollars in the annual research expenditures.

The institute maintains a close association with the Texas A&M University College of Engineering, the College of Architecture, and the Bush School of Government and Public Service, as well as other academic units within Texas A&M University and the larger Texas A&M University System.

Headquartered on the Texas A&M University System RELLIS Campus in Bryan, Texas, TTI maintains a roadside safety proving ground facility and several laboratories there. TTI has urban offices in Austin, Dallas, El Paso, Fort Worth, Houston, San Antonio, and Waco and area offices in Laredo, Corpus Christi, and Washington, D.C. TTI operates several state and national research centers.

== See also ==
- Clearview (typeface)
