= Texas A&M University School of Nursing =

Nursing College of Texas A&M University

Coordinates: 30.5985°N 96.3945°W

College of Nursing
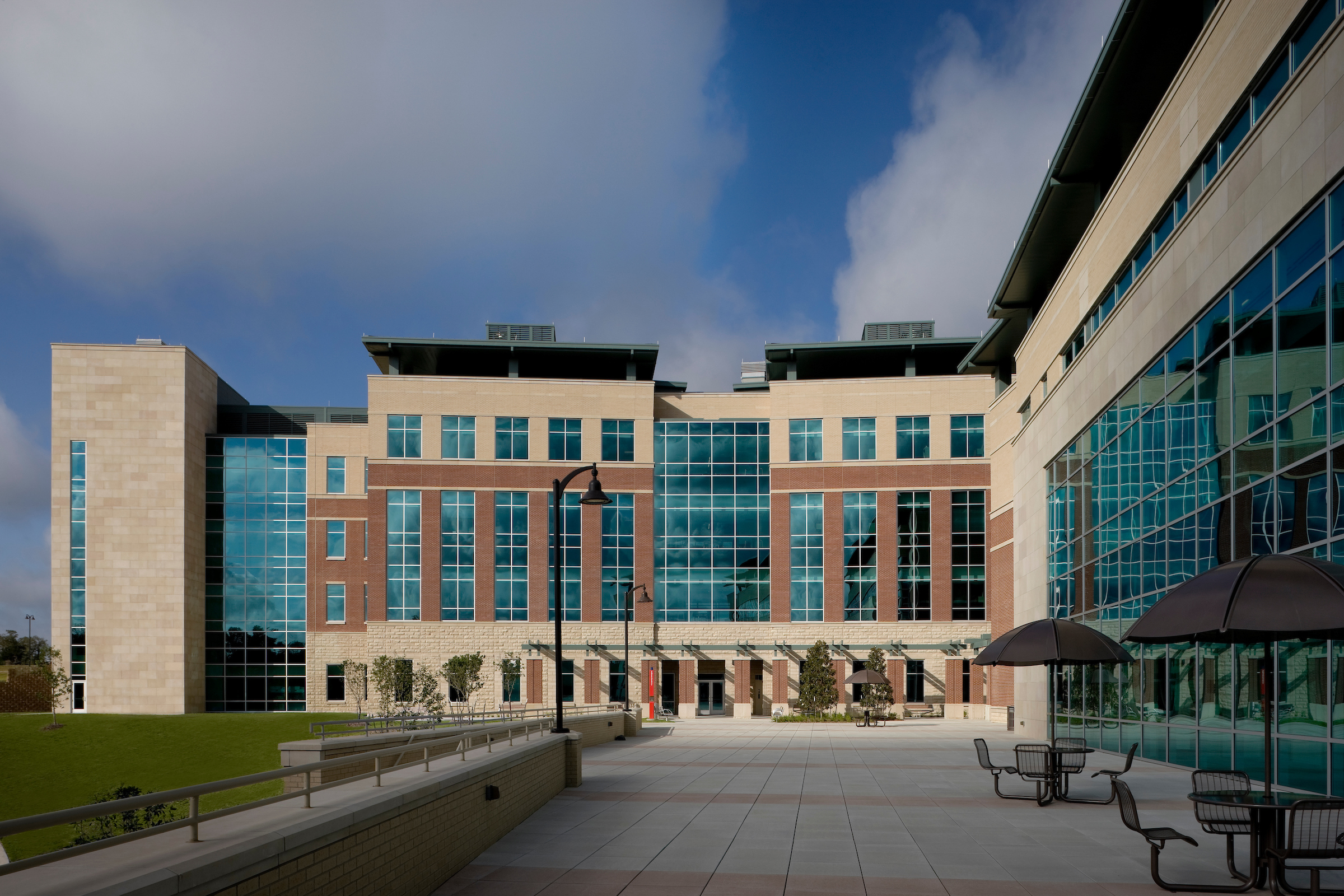
- Type: Public
- Established: 2008; 18 years ago
- Dean: Trisha Leann Horsley
- Faculty: 45 (full-time)
- Location: Bryan, Texas, United States
- Website: nursing.tamu.edu

The Texas A&M University College of Nursing in Bryan, Texas is the nursing school of Texas A&M University and a component of Texas A&M Health. It was established in 2008 to address the critical nursing shortage in Texas.

== History ==
The Texas Higher Education Coordinating Board approved the establishment of the Texas A&M Health Science Center (TAMHSC) College of Nursing in January 2008, and the Texas Board of Nursing granted initial approval to its Bachelor of Science in Nursing program on July 17. The college admitted an inaugural class of 44 students that year under founding dean Sharon Wilkerson.

The baccalaureate program received initial accreditation from the Commission on Collegiate Nursing Education (CCNE) in 2009, and the Registered Nurse to Bachelor of Science in Nursing (RN-to-BSN) program began that year. The college graduated its first students in December 2009, when 19 students completed the accelerated BSN program, the first 21 graduates of the traditional BSN program followed in May 2010. In April 2010, the Texas Board of Nursing moved the BSN program from initial to full approval.

In 2010 nursing education expanded to the TAMHSC campus in Round Rock, and the college moved its primary operations to the Health Science Center’s new campus in Bryan.

In July 2013, the TAMHSC became an academic unit of Texas A&M University, bringing the College of Nursing within the university’s administrative structure.

== Academics ==
The college offers three undergraduate degrees in nursing and three Master of Science in specific fields of nursing.

The college currently has a 99% first time pass rate for the NCLEX-RN.
