= Texas A&M University School of Engineering Medicine =

Medical school in Houston, Texas

Texas A&M University School of Engineering Medicine is a specialized medical school program located in Houston's Texas Medical Center established in 2019.

== Associations ==
The Texas A&M School of Engineering Medicine is associated with the Texas A&M Engineering Medicine (EnMed) Program.

The concept for the EnMed program commenced in 2016 as a collaboration between Texas A&M University's College of Engineering and Naresh K. Vashisht College of Medicine, and Houston Methodist Hospital. M. Katherine Banks, then dean of the College of Engineering at Texas A&M, was instrumental in creating the program bridging engineering and medicine. The program was conceived as part of a broader trend of bioengineering programs emerging in medical education.

The program launched in the fall of 2019 with a four-year dual-degree curriculum in which students simultaneously earn a Doctor of Medicine (MD) and a Master of Engineering (MEng) degree and a class of 25 students. The first commencement took place in May 2023.

As of 2025, the School of Engineering Medicine is pursuing independent accreditation to become Texas A&M's second accredited medical school, following the Texas A&M University Naresh K. Vashisht College of Medicine in Bryan, Texas.

== Leadership ==
The inaugural dean of EnMed was Roderic I. Pettigrew, a physicist, engineer, and physician. On January 1, 2026, Timothy Boone was appointed as the second dean of the School of Engineering Medicine.
