= Texas A&M University School of Veterinary Medicine & Biomedical Sciences =

Coordinates: 30.6130°N 96.3527°W

- Type: Public
- Established: 1916; 110 years ago
- Affiliations: Texas A&M University
- Dean: John August
- Undergraduates: 1739 (2009)
- Postgraduates: 669 (2009)
- Location: College Station, Texas, United States
- Website: vetmed.tamu.edu/

The Texas A&M University College of Veterinary Medicine & Biomedical Sciences is the veterinary school of Texas A&M University, a public research university in College Station, Texas. It was founded in 1916 and is one of only 31 colleges or schools of veterinary medicine in the United States and Canada. The school offers an undergraduate program in Biomedical Sciences, a professional Doctor of Veterinary Medicine program, and numerous graduate programs relating to veterinary medicine and epidemiology.

== History ==
The first record of an attempt to teach veterinary science at the Agricultural & Mechanical College (as Texas A&M University was called at the time) was made in the third session of the college in 1878-79 when the college surgeon, D. Port Smythe, M.D., was also listed on the faculty as professor of anatomy, physiology and hygiene. No course is described, however, and no further record is available to indicate that such a course was actually given.

The catalog of the fourth session also mentions proposed lectures in veterinary science, concerned mainly with domestic animals, but again no formal record exists of any actual courses given at the time.

In April 1888, the college received a state appropriation of $2500 for equipping and operating a Department of Veterinary Science, and on June 6, 1888, Mark Francis received his formal appointment to the faculty. This marked the real beginning of professional veterinary medicine in Texas; Francis was the first trained veterinarian at the college and would become one of the most distinguished men in United States veterinary medicine.

=== Chronological history ===
- 1888 - Department of Veterinary Science formally started.
- 1902 - Erection of the Chemistry and Veterinary Building.
- 1903 - First Veterinary Association in Texas organized at Fort Worth. Dr. Mark Francis was elected president.
- 1908 - Veterinary Hospital constructed.
- 1916 - School of Veterinary Medicine established. Dr. Mark Francis was appointed the first Dean.
- 1920 - First grads (4) to receive DVM degrees from Texas A&M.
- 1929 - Texas A&M Student Chapter of the American Veterinary Medical Association organized.
- 1937 - R.P. Marsteller appointed Dean.
- 1941 - Enrollment limited to 100 new students each year.
- 1947 - R.C. Dunn appointed Dean.
- 1949 - Veterinary Library opened.
- 1953 - W.W. Armistead appointed Dean.
- 1953 - Erection of Veterinary Medical Hospital.
- 1955 - Erection of Veterinary Sciences Building.
- 1957 - Alvin A. Price appointed Dean.
- 1963 - The designation College of Veterinary Medicine replaces former designation of School of Veterinary Medicine.
- 1963 - First woman admitted to the professional program.
- 1966 - First woman receives DVM degree from Texas A&M.
- 1967 - The Texas Veterinary Medical Diagnostic Laboratory is established.
- 1973 - George C. Shelton appointed Dean.
- 1990 - John Shadduck appointed Dean.
- 1993 - The Veterinary Research Building and new Large Animal Clinic are erected.
- 1997 - Robert F. Playter Jr. appointed as Interim Dean.
- 1998 - H. Richard Adams appointed Dean.
- 2009 - Eleanor M. Green appointed Dean.
- 2020 - Dr. John August appointed Dean.

== Academics ==
=== Doctor of Veterinary Medicine ===
The Doctor of Veterinary Medicine (DVM) program is a four-year degree consisting of three years of classroom and laboratory instruction and a fourth year of clinical experience. Each year the school admits 132 students through a highly competitive application process. The professional curriculum allows students to track in small, mixed, or large animal medicine with opportunities for experience in exotics and research.

=== DVM/MBA ===
The school offers a joint program with the Mays Business School. Students earn a Master of Business Administration (MBA) degree, in addition to their DVM. Students complete all four years of the DVM program with an additional year earning their MBA. The MBA program is typically completed between the 2nd and 3rd years of the DVM program.

=== Other degrees ===
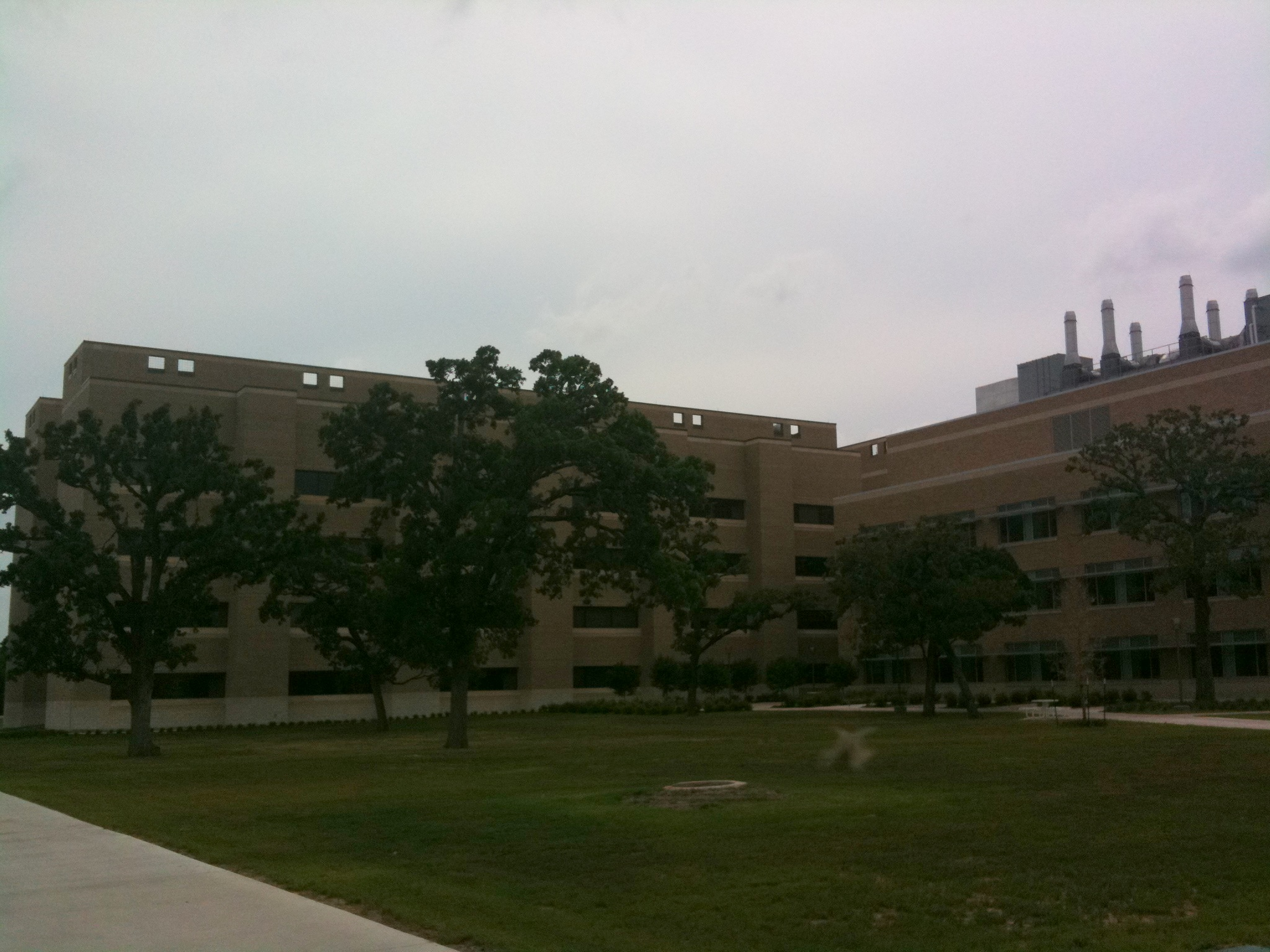
Texas A&M Veterinary Research Tower.

The school offers the PhD degree in two disciplines, one in Biomedical Sciences and one in Veterinary Pathobiology. It also offers the Master's of Science in several disciplines and a bachelor's degree in biomedical sciences is available for undergraduate students.

== Research ==
Texas A&M's School of Veterinary Medicine conducts research in genetics, physiology and pharmacology, animal husbandry, virology, bacteriology, and a number of other disciplines. Clinical research is performed by clinicians in the college veterinary hospitals.

The school's research into animal cloning is one of the more publicized ventures. Texas A&M scientists created the first cloned domestic animal, a cat named "CC (cat)", on December 22, 2001. Texas A&M was also the first academic institution to clone each of six different species: cattle, a goat, pigs, a cat, a deer and a horse.

== Departments ==
=== Veterinary Integrative Biosciences ===
The Department of Veterinary Integrative Biosciences (VIBS) carries out teaching, research, and service across a wide spectrum of biosciences. Biomedical science includes investigation at molecular, cellular, organismal, and populational levels.

=== Veterinary Pathobiology ===
The Department of Veterinary Pathobiology ("VTPB") at Texas A&M University is one of the largest and most active in the country. The department offers programs of graduate instruction and research leading to the degrees of Master of Science and Doctor of Philosophy in Genetics, Microbiology, and Pathology, and the Master of Science degree in Parasitology.

=== Veterinary Physiology and Pharmacology ===
The Department of Veterinary Physiology and Pharmacology has multiple missions in the areas of teaching, research, and service with an emphasis on both veterinary and human physiology and pharmacology. Teaching responsibilities within the department fall into three general categories: 1) undergraduate instruction leading to the Bachelor of Science degree in Biomedical Science, 2) graduate instruction leading to the Master of Science and Doctor of Philosophy degrees in Biomedical Science and the Doctor of Philosophy degree in Toxicology and 3) professional instruction leading to the Doctor of Veterinary Medicine degree.

The primary research focus areas within the department include toxicology, cardiovascular sciences, reproductive sciences and pharmacology. The department has a faculty including: 28 full-time faculty, 17 visiting and adjunct faculty, and 113 technical and administrative support staff. Departmental extramural grant support is 8 million dollars per year and the department's research and teaching facilities encompass over 100,000 square feet within the college. The Department of Veterinary Physiology and Pharmacology is the only department of its kind in the state of Texas and interacts extensively with the Colleges of Agriculture, Science, Engineering, Education, the Texas A&M Health Science Center, and the School of Rural Public Health. Long-standing collaborative interactions also exist with Texas AgriLife Research and the Texas Engineering Experiment Station.

=== Large Animal Clinical Sciences ===
Focused mainly on research into care of larger animals such as horses and cattle.

=== Small Animal Clinical Sciences ===
Focused mainly on research and care of "companion animals" (e.g. cats and dogs primarily, but also birds and smaller animals).

=== Biomedical Sciences ===

The Biomedical Sciences (BIMS) Graduate Program was established in 1999 as the Texas A&M Health Science Center Graduate School of Biomedical Sciences. It offers master's and doctoral programs in biomedical and public health sciences.

=== Veterinary Medical Teaching Hospital ===
The Veterinary Medical Teaching Hospital was established in 1915 when the Texas Legislature approved the creation of a public school of veterinary medicine and provided funds for building of a veterinary teaching hospital.

Today, the VMTH generates approximately $7.5 million annually, or 75% of the facility's operating budget, from clinical services offered to client animals brought in for diagnosis and treatment. Among notable patients of the hospital has been Ch. Clussexx Three D Grinchy Glee (a/k/a Stump), the 2009 Westminster Kennel Club Dog Show winner (Stump was referred to VMTH in January 2006 with multiple bacterial infections and spent 13 days there).

The hospital also benefits from state appropriations to the CVM for faculty salaries, utilities, grounds maintenance, building maintenance and other infrastructure maintenance costs.

In recent years, the hospital has served animals referred from approximately 2,500 veterinarians in 164 of Texas's 254 counties and 31 of the 50 United States.
