= Texas A&M University School of Dentistry =

Dental school in Dallas, Texas, US

Texas A&M University College of Dentistry
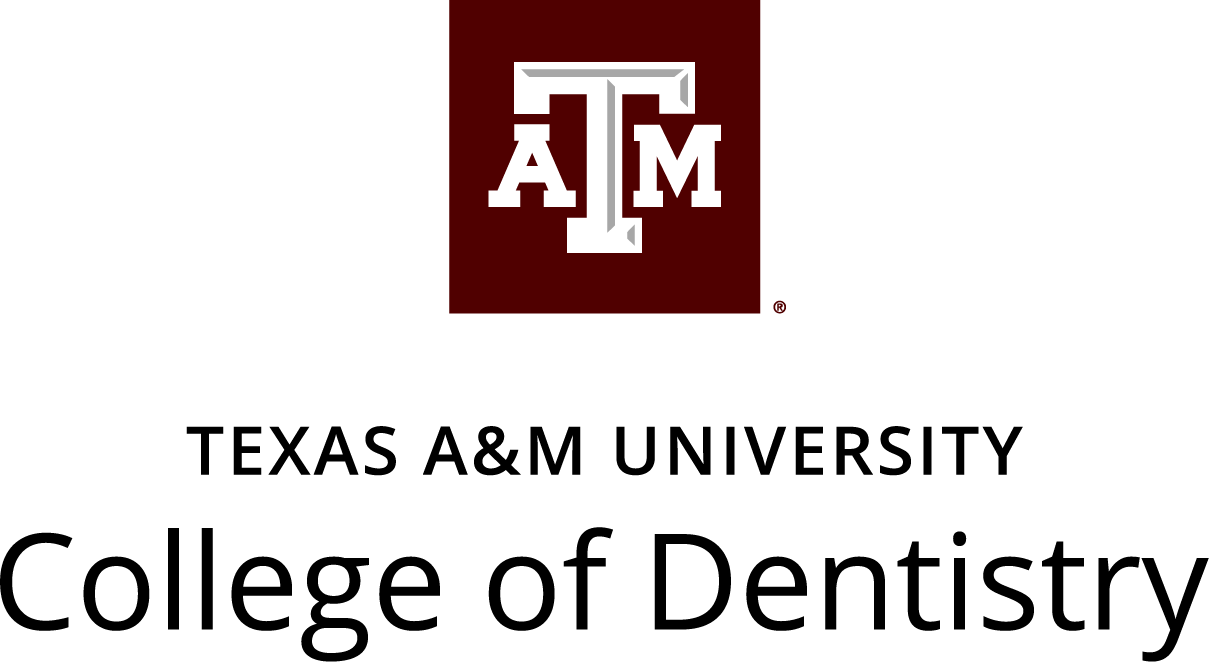
- Former names: State Dental College (1905–1918); Baylor University School of Dentistry (1918–1971); Baylor College of Dentistry (1971–1996); Texas A&M Baylor College of Dentistry (1996–1999); Texas A&M Health Science Center Baylor College of Dentistry (1999–2016); Texas A&M College of Dentistry (2016–Present)
- Type: Public
- Established: 1905; 121 years ago
- Dean: Lily T. García
- Location: Dallas, Texas, United States; 32°47′21″N 96°46′55″W
- Campus: Urban
- Website: https://dentistry.tamu.edu/

The Texas A&M University College of Dentistry, located in Dallas, Texas, is the dental school of Texas A&M University and is a component of Texas A&M Health. It has had several name changes since its founding in 1905, as the State Dental College.

The school provides the Doctor of Dental Surgery (D.D.S.), Master of Science (M.S.) and Bachelor of Science (B.S.) in Dental Hygiene degrees, and graduate training in 10 dental specialties.

== History ==
The Texas A&M College of Dentistry started in 1905 years as the State Dental College, a privately operated three-year school which had four graduates in its first class.

In 1918, the school's operations were taken over by Baylor University and the school was renamed Baylor University School of Dentistry.

The State of Texas took over operations in 1971, creating a non-profit corporation and renaming the school to Baylor College of Dentistry. In 1996, the College of Dentistry was placed under the auspices of the Texas A&M Health Science Center. In 1997, through its Center for TeleHealth, the Texas A&M Baylor College of Dentistry became the nation's first dental school to successfully demonstrate the use of telecommunications technology for dental medicine through a long-distance patient consultation between dentists at the BCD campus and 175 dental professionals convened in Orlando, Florida. On June 1, 2016 Texas A&M announced that as of August 1, 2016, the dental school would be officially renamed "Texas A&M College of Dentistry." On August 31, 2022, it was announced that as of September 1st, 2022, the name of the institution would be changed to the Texas A&M University School of Dentistry.

== Academics ==
The Texas A&M School of Dentistry offers a four-year program leading to a doctor of dental surgery degree; a bachelor's degree in dental hygiene; several master's degree programs and a Ph.D. program in biomedical sciences; and post-doctoral degrees in the dental specialties.

Almost two-thirds of all the dentists in the Dallas–Fort Worth metroplex received their education at the School of Dentistry, and more than one-third of all dentists in Texas are graduates of the school; more than 9000 dentists and hygienists have graduated from the school.

== Community Clinics ==
=== Dr. M.C. Cooper Dental Clinic ===
The Texas A&M College of Dentistry, with support from two anonymous donors and the Delta Dental Foundation, opened the Dr. M.C. Cooper Dental Clinic in April 2021. The clinic is named in honor of Marcellus Clayton Cooper, the first African-American dentist in Texas.

The clinic will be staffed by Texas A&M College of Dentistry employees and will focus on comprehensive dental care for patients of all ages. Services will include preventive care, treatment and oral health education. Dental students, along with dental hygiene and graduate students, will also provide care under the supervision of licensed dental faculty.

== See also ==
- American Student Dental Association
