= M. Katherine Banks =

Retired 26th President of Texas A&M University

Kathy Banks

26th President of Texas A&M University
- In office June 1, 2021 – July 20, 2023
- Preceded by: John L. Junkins (Interim)
- Succeeded by: Mark A. Welsh III

Dean of the College of Engineering
- In office January 10, 2012 – June 1, 2021
- Preceded by: N. K. Anand (Interim)
- Succeeded by: John E. Hurtado (Interim)

Personal details
- Born: Margaret Katherine Banks; January 1960 (age 66) Whitesburg, Kentucky, U.S.
- Spouse: Arthur Paul Schwab
- Children: 6
- Education: University of Florida (BS); University of North Carolina at Chapel Hill (MS); Duke University (PhD)

Academic background
- Thesis: Fate of deposited cells in an aerobic binary bacterial biofilm (1989)
- Doctoral advisor: James D. Bryers

Academic work
- Discipline: Environmental engineering
- Sub-discipline: Bioremediation
- Institutions: Kansas State University; Purdue University; Texas A&M University

Margaret Katherine "Kathy" Banks is an American academic and civil engineer. She was the 26th president of Texas A&M University from 2021 to 2023, where she was the second woman to hold the position.

Banks is an elected fellow of the American Society of Civil Engineers, was elected to the National Academy of Engineering in 2014, and was formerly the dean of the College of Engineering, and the Jack and Kay Hockema Professor at Purdue University. Her research interests include applied microbial systems, biofilm processes, wastewater treatment and reuse, and phytoremediation bioremediation.

== Education and career ==
Banks grew up in Whitesburg, Kentucky, a small coal mining town. She earned her Bachelor of Science in environmental engineering from the University of Florida in 1982, Master of Science in environmental engineering from the University of North Carolina at Chapel Hill in 1985, and Doctorate of Philosophy in civil and environmental engineering from Duke University in 1989.

Banks was an associate professor at Kansas State University from 1989 to 1997. From 1997 to 2012, she was a professor in the Department of Civil Engineering at Purdue University. She was the Jack and Kay Hockema Professor at Purdue and later the Bowen Engineering Head of the School of Civil Engineering.

Since 2012, Banks has been at Texas A&M University, where she served as the 26th president and the Vice Chancellor of National Laboratories and National Security Strategic Initiatives. Prior to assuming the presidency in June 2021, Banks held the roles of Vice Chancellor of Engineering and National Laboratories for the Texas A&M University System, Dean of the College of Engineering, Director of the Texas A&M Engineering Experiment Station, University Distinguished Professor, and Harold J. Haynes Dean's Chair Professor.

On February 13, 2019, Banks was named to the Board of Directors of Halliburton.

== Presidency of Texas A&M University ==
Banks served for nine years as vice chancellor of engineering and dean of Texas A&M's College of Engineering. Banks was nominated to the presidency of Texas A&M University on March 3, 2021, and was confirmed by the Board of Regents on March 31, 2021. She began her tenure on June 1, 2021.

In June 2023, Texas A&M University recruited Kathleen McElroy, a 1981 graduate of the university and tenured professor at the University of Texas at Austin, to lead the university's journalism program. A month later, negotiations broke down due to changes in the offer given to McElroy, which initially was a tenured full-professor position, with press, faculty, and McElroy reporting that "outside influences" had rejected the nomination. McElroy ultimately rejected the offer and decided to remain at the University of Texas at Austin. Banks rejected the claims made by the media in a meeting with the faculty, claiming that she was unaware of any changes to the initial job offer. However, subsequent investigation by the university's Office of General Counsel revealed that Banks was significantly, unethically, and illegally involved in the process, was aware of these changes, and attempted to cover it up.

On Monday, July 17, 2023, the interim dean of the Texas A&M College of Arts and Sciences, José Luis Bermúdez, stepped down. Two days later, the Texas A&M Faculty Senate passed a resolution to create a fact-finding committee into the mishandling of the hiring of McElroy. During that meeting, Banks admitted that the debacle was embarrassing and said "I take responsibility for it as I should, as the president of the university," although she claimed neither her, nor her office, or the Board of Regents had revised the original contract that was offered. She also told faculty members that she did not approve changes to an offer letter that led McElroy to walk away from negotiations amid conservative backlash to her hiring. This claim was subsequently disputed by the university's lawyers and Hart Blanton, the head of the university's Department of Communication and Journalism, who released a statement through his lawyer on July 21 that challenged Banks' statements from the July 19 faculty meeting in which she suggested that she did not know why changes were made in the offers to McElroy. Blanton claimed that Banks "injected herself into the process atypically and early on". He also claimed that a diminished offer given to McElroy had his signature forged on it by the university.

Late in the evening of July 20, 2023, Banks formally resigned from her position as president. In her resignation letter to Texas A&M University System Chancellor John Sharp, she wrote

"The recent challenges regarding Dr. McElroy have made it clear to me that I must retire immediately. The negative press is a distraction from the wonderful work being done here."

Mark A. Welsh III was appointed acting president by Chancellor Sharp following Banks' resignation.

== Personal life ==
Banks is married to Arthur Paul Schwab, whom she met while they were both professors at Kansas State University. They have released several research studies together. Schwab moved with Banks from Kansas State to Purdue University in 1998, joining the faculty as a professor. He now works as a soil and crop science professor in the College of Agriculture and Life Sciences at Texas A&M University, where he has worked since July 2012. They have six children.

== Awards ==
1. American Society of Civil Engineers Petersen Outstanding Woman of the Year Award.
2. American Society of Civil Engineers Rudolph Hering Medal, 2010.
3. Rudolph Hering Medal conferred by American Society of Civil Engineers
4. Oil and Gas Investor's 25 Influential Women in Energy Pinnacle Award
5. Purdue Faculty Scholar Award
6. Sloan Foundation Mentoring Fellowship
7. American Association of University Women Fellowship.
8. National Academy of Engineering Membership
