= Dallas Fire-Rescue Department =

Fire department in Dallas, Texas

Operational area
- Country: United States
- State: Texas
- City: Dallas
- Coordinates: 32°47′N 96°48′W

Agency overview
- Established: 4 July 1872
- Employees: 1,939 (2017)
- Staffing: Career
- Fire chief: Justin Ball
- EMS level: Advanced Life Support (ALS) and Basic Life Support (BLS)
- IAFF: Local 58

Facilities and equipment
- Divisions: 7
- Battalions: 9
- Stations: 59
- Engines: 59
- Trucks: 24
- Rescues: 2
- Ambulances: 55 (49 Frontline, 6 SFP)
- Tenders: 1
- HAZMAT: 2
- USAR: TX TF 2 Urban Search and Rescue Team
- Airport crash: 5
- Wildland: 1
- Fireboats: 1
- Rescue boats: 6
- Light and air: 1

Website
- Official website
- Dallas Fire Fighters Association

The Dallas Fire-Rescue Department provides Fire Suppression, Hazardous Materials Mitigation, Technical Rescue Services, Emergency Medical Response Services and other public safety services to the city of Dallas, Texas. Dallas Fire-Rescue is the second-largest fire department in Texas, with 59 fire stations.

== Overview ==
=== Area served ===
The Dallas Fire-Rescue Department serves approximately 1.6 million people within the City of Dallas, Texas. DFRD is organized into 2 divisions, with 10 battalions, and 59 fire stations for each geographic area of the city. Dallas Fire-Rescue faces some challenges within their district. Including 2 airports, large bodies of water, many high rises, and over 6 major highways.

== Organization ==
The department's current fire chief is Justin Ball. The department has four bureaus, each directed by an assistant chief: Emergency Response, Emergency Medical Services and Special Operations; Recruiting and Communications; Fire Prevention & Investigation; and Training and Administration. Under each assistant chief, deputy chiefs or managers coordinate specific programs and branches.

== History ==
The Dallas Fire-Rescue Department began operations on July 4, 1872, in response to a large fire 12 years earlier in July 1860. During the interim, there was a disorganized response with delays in starting due in part to the Civil War, The department became fully salaried in 1885.

Chief Artis assumed his role in December 2018 after the previous chief David Coatney resigned to become director of Texas A&M Engineering Extension Service.

== Urban search and rescue ==
The Dallas Fire-Rescue Department was instrumental in the creation of Texas Task Force 2, one of two urban search and rescue (USAR) teams in the State of Texas. It is managed by the Texas A&M Engineering Extension Service and headquartered in Dallas.

Notable incidents responded to by Task Force 2 include Hurricane Dolly (2008), Hurricane Ike (2008), the West Fertilizer Company explosion (2013) & Hurricane Harvey (2017).

== Stations and apparatus ==
Dallas Fire-Rescue operates from 59 stations. Fire apparatus operated is mainly Spartan however a change to Pierce has started with the recent purchase of a squad & several trucks & engines.

| Fire station number and nickname | Address | Engine Company | Truck Company | EMS Rescue Units | Chief and Supervisor Units | Special Unit | Battalion |
|---|---|---|---|---|---|---|---|
| 1 "Design District" | 1901 Irving Blvd. | Engine 1 | | Rescue 1 | EMS Supervisor (780) | Blocker 1 | 9 |
| 2 "Midway Mavericks" | 4211 Northhaven Road | Engine 2 | | | | USAR Trench Truck | 7 |
| 3 "The Gator Pit" | 500 N. Malcolm X Blvd. | Engine 3 | Truck 3 (Tiller) | Rescue 3 Single-Function Paramedic Rescue 78 | | Hazmat 3(Tiller) | 1 |
| 4 "Old School" | 816 South Akard Street | Engine 4 | Truck 4 (Tiller) | Rescue 4 | Battalion Chief 1 | | 1 |
| 5 "The Nickel" | 2039 St. Augustine Drive | Engine 5 | | Rescue 5 Single-Function Paramedic Rescue 75 | | | 8 |
| 6 "Pride of South Dallas" | 2301 Pennsylvania Ave, Dallas | Engine 6 | | Rescue 6 | | Command 1 | 1 |
| 7 "Pride of North Dallas" | 6010 Davenport Road | Engine 7 | | | Battalion Chief 2 | Booster 7 | 2 |
| 8 "Old East Dallas" | 1904 North Garrett Avenue | Engine 8 | | Rescue 8 | Battalion Chief 3 | | 3 |
| 9 "King of Kleburg" | 2002 Cool Mist Lane | Engine 9 | | | | Booster 9 | 8 |
| 10 "The Last Outpost" | 4451 Frankford Road | Engine 10 | Truck 10 | Rescue 10 | | | 2 |
| 11 "The Big House" | 3828 Cedar Springs Road | Engine 11 | Truck 11 | Rescue 11 | | | 3 |
| 12 "Dirty Dozen" | 7520 West Wheatland Road | Engine 12 | | Single-Function Paramedic Rescue 76 | | | 6 |
| 13 "Lucky Dogs" | 6902 Frankford Road | Engine 13 | | Rescue 13 | | | 2 |
| 14 "12th Street Bomberos" | 1005 West Twelfth Street | Engine 14 | | | Battalion Chief 6 | | 6 |
| 15 "Top of the Cliff" | 111 East Eighth Street | Engine 15 | | Rescue 15 | | Tender 15 (TIFMAS), Blocker 5 | 6 |
| 16 "Pride of West Dallas" | 2616 Chalk Hill Road | Engine 16 | | | | | 9 |
| 17 "Pride of Lakewood" | 6045 Belmont Avenue | Engine 17 | Truck 17 | | | | 3 |
| 18 "Always Rollin'" | 660 North Griffin Street | Engine 18 | Truck 18 (Platform) | Rescue 18, Rescue 218 | | Air supply units (820), (821), Light-Air unit (829) | 1 |
| 19 "Fightin' XIX" | 5600 E Grand Ave | Engine 19 | Truck 19 | Rescue 19 | | | 3 |
| 20 "Knights of the North" | 12727 Montfort Drive | Engine 20 | Truck 20 (Tiller) | Rescue 20 | | | 2 |
| 21 | 3210 Love Field Drive (Dallas Love Field) | | | | | Red 1, 2 & 3, Rescue 21 | 7 |
| 22 "King of Coit" | 12200 Coit Road | Engine 22 | | Rescue 22 Single-Function Paramedic Rescue 74 | | | 2 |
| 23 "Oak Cliff Fire Dept" | 1660 South Corinth Street Road | Engine 23 | Truck 23 (Tiller) | Rescue 23 | | | 5 |
| 24 "Fort Hatcher" | 2426 Elsie Faye Heggins St. | Engine 24 | Truck 24 | Rescue 24 | | | 1 |
| 25 "South Oak Cliff" | 2112 56th Street | Engine 25 | Truck 25 | Rescue 25 Single-Function Paramedic Rescue 70 | Battalion Chief 5 | | 5 |
| 26 "Pride of West Oak Cliff" | 3303 Sheldon Avenue | Engine 26 | | Rescue 26 | EMS Supervisor (781) | | 9 |
| 27 "Prestonville" | 8401 Douglas Avenue | Engine 27 | Truck 27 (Platform) | Rescue 27 | | USAR 27 | 7 |
| 28 "Lake Highlands" | 8701 Greenville Avenue | Engine 28 | | Rescue 28 | Battalion Chief 4 | Box 4 Canteen Unit (896) Box 4 Support Unit (897) | 4 |
| 29 "The Nines" | 9830 Shadow Way Dallas | Engine 29 | | Rescue 29 | | Booster 29 | 4 |
| 30"Luckey" | 11381 Zodiac Ln | Engine 30 | | Rescue 30 | | Swift Water 30 | 7 |
| 31 "White Rock" | 9365 Garland Road | Engine 31 | | | | Boat 31 | 4 |
| 32 "Gateway to the Grove" | 4262 N. Jim Miller Road | Engine 32 | | Rescue 32 | EMS Supervisor (783) | | 8 |
| 33 "Oak Cliff" | 745 West Illinois Avenue | Engine 33 | Truck 33 | Rescue 33 | | USAR 33 | 6 |
| 34 "Pride of the Grove" | 1234 Carbona Drive | Engine 34 | | Rescue 34 | Battalion Chief 8 | Rescue 77 | 8 |
| 35 "6 Mile Road" | 3839 Walnut Hill Lane | Engine 35 | | | Battalion Chief 7 | | 7 |
| 36 "West Dallas" | 3241 North Hampton Road | Engine 36 | Truck 36 (Platform) | Single-Function Paramedic Rescue 71 | Battalion Chief 9 | | 9 |
| 37 "Five Points" | 6780 Greenville Avenue | Engine 37 | Truck 37 | Rescue 37 | Division Chief 1 (806) | Hazmat 37 | 4 |
| 38 "Bonnieview's Bravest" | 2839 Wilhurt Ave. | Engine 38 | | Rescue 38 Single-Function Paramedic Rescue 72 | EMS Supervisor (785) | | 5 |
| 39 "Smoke on the Water" | 2850 Ruidosa Ave | Engine 39 | Truck 39 (Tiller) | Rescue 39 | | Marine 1 | 4 |
| 40 "Cowboys of the Cliff" | 2440 Kirnwood Drive | Engine 40 | Truck 40 | Rescue 40 | | Brush 40 | 5 |
| 41 "Preston Hollow" | 5920 Royal Ln | Engine 41 | | Rescue 41 | EMS Supervisor (782) | | 7 |
| 42 "West Mockingbird" | 3333 West Mockingbird Lane | Engine 42 | | Rescue 42 | | Red 42 (Reserve) Mass Casualty Vehicle (787) | 7 |
| 43 "Pride of Letot" | 2844 Lombardy Lane | Engine 43 | Truck 43 | Rescue 43 | | Blocker 43 | 7 |
| 44 "Sunny South" | 2025 Lagow St. | Engine 44 | | Rescue 44 | | | 3 |
| 45 "Trinity Groves" | 716 West Commerce Street | Engine 45 | | Rescue 45 | | Booster 45 | 1 |
| 46 "South Oak Cliff" | 331 E Camp Wisdom Rd | Engine 46 | | Rescue 46 | | | 5 |
| 47 "Warehouse District" | 7161 Envoy Court | Engine 47 | | Rescue 47 | | | 9 |
| 48 "Pride of the Northeast" | 10480 East Northwest Highway | Engine 48 | | Single-Function Paramedic Rescue 73 | | Boat 48 | 4 |
| 49 "The Rock" | 4901 South Hampton Road (Dallas Executive Airport) | Engine 49 | | Rescue 49 | | Red 49 | 6 |
| 50 "By Aerial, By Land, By Sea" | 841 S. Walton Walker Blvd. | Engine 50 | Truck 50 | Rescue 50 | | Trail 50 Boat 50 | 9 |
| 51 "Area 51" | 200 South St. Augustine Road | Engine 51 | | Rescue 51 | | Booster 51 | 8 |
| 52 "Bigfoot" | 2504 Cockrell Hill Road | Engine 52 | | Rescue 52 | | Brush 52 | 6 |
| 53 "Far East Dallas" | 1407 John West Rd | Engine 53 | Truck 53 | Rescue 53 | | | 8 |
| 54 "Pride of Highland Hills" | 6238 Bonnieview Road | Engine 54 | | Rescue 54 | | Boat 54 Brush 54 | 5 |
| 55 "Double Nickle" | 6600 Trammel Drive | Engine 55 | | Rescue 55 | EMS Supervisor (784) | | 3 |
| 56 "Fretz Park" | 7040 Belt Line Rd | Engine 56 | Truck 56 | Rescue 56 | | | 2 |
| 57 "Beast of the Northeast" | 10801 Audelia Road | Engine 57 | Truck 57 | Rescue 57 | | | 4 |
| 58 "The Outpost" | 9393 Water Mill Rd | Engine 58 | | | | Booster 58 | 7 |
| 59 "Pride of the Grove" | 7097 Jim Miller Rd | Engine 59 | Truck 59 | Rescue 59 | | Swift Water 59 | 8 |

== Notable incidents ==
- Golden Pheasant Fire, February 16, 1964, resulted in four line of duty deaths
- 2016 shooting of Dallas police officers resulted in the deaths of five Dallas Police Department officers
- 2022 Dallas airshow mid-air collision involving two planes resulted in the deaths of six people at Dallas Executive Airport

== Alarm assignments ==
Dallas Fire-Rescue Department has a set protocol for structure fire responses. Each fire is dispatched as a "Structure Fire Reported" (Category A) or "HIRISE Structure Fire Reported" (Category B). Once a fire unit is on scene and has reported on the conditions of the fire, the unit will either "tap out" the box (canceling all units except for the units on scene already) if there is no fire or smoke showing, or upgrade the fire to a working assignment. If the fire is large enough, "alarm" upgrades will be transmitted, sending additional units to the scene. A working fire becomes a first alarm, if more units are required, a second alarm is transmitted, and so on and so forth. Any Category B High Rise Box with that reports out with initial fire company with fire or smoke showing will automatically be transmitted as 2nd Alarm High Rise Box. The following is a list of Alarm types along with the Units assigned.

| Alarm Type | Units Assigned |
|---|---|
| Box Alarm (Category A) | 3 Engine Companies, 2 Truck Companies, 2 Battalion Chief Units, 1 RIC Engine |
| Working Fire Upgrade | 1 Rescue Unit, 2 Fire Investigator Units |
| Second Alarm Upgrade | Adds 3 Engine Companies, 2 Truck Companies, 2 Battalion Chief Units, Safety Chief (832) 1 Division Chief Unit (Unless already on ticket), 1 USAR Team, 1 Rescue Companies, Air Truck (829), EMS Supervisor Unit, 896 (Canteen), PIO*(During Business Hours |
| Third Alarm Upgrade | Adds 3 Engine Companies, 1 Truck Company, 2 EMS Supervisor Unit, 780, PIO |
| Fourth Alarm Upgrade | Adds 3 Engine Companies, 1 Truck Company, Command 1, Fire Marshall |
| Fifth Alarm Upgrade | Adds 3 Engine Companies and Trucks will be at the Incident Commanders request |
| Box Alarm (Category B "High Rise") | 4 Engine Companies, 4 Truck Companies, 3 Battalion Chief Units, 1 Division Chief Unit, 1 Safety Chief (832) Unit, 1 EMS Shift SDO, 1 Rescue Unit |
| Second Alarm Upgrade(High Rise) | Adds 4 Engine Companies, 3 Truck Companies, 2 Battalion Chief Units, 1 Division Chief Unit (Unless already on ticket), 1 USAR Team, 2 Rescue Companies, Air Truck (829), EMS Supervisor Unit |
| Third Alarm Upgrade(High Rise) | Adds 3 Engine Companies, 2 Truck Companies, 2 Rescue Companies |
| Four through 6 Alarm Upgrade(High Rise) | Adds 3 Engine Companies and 2 Truck Companies |
| Seventh or Greater Alarm Upgrade(High Rise) | Adds 3 Engine Companies and Trucks will be at the Incident Commanders request |

== Line of duty deaths ==
The Dallas Fire-Rescue Department has suffered a number of Line of Duty Deaths during its operational history. The department has a memorial to their fallen members at the department museum. DFRS maintains an interactive list that explores the individual's lives & the events that led to their line of duty death.

== See also ==
- Dallas Fire Station No. 16
- FEMA Urban Search and Rescue Task Force
- Texas Task Force 1
- Texas Task Force 2
- Urban Search and Rescue
