= N. K. Anand =

American academic

Interim Dean of the Dwight Look College of Engineering
- In office September 1, 2011 – January 10, 2012
- Preceded by: G. Kemble Bennett
- Succeeded by: M. Katherine Banks

Personal details
- Born: Nagamangala Krishnamurthy Anand; 1956 (age 69–70) Mumbai, Maharashtra, India

Academic background
- Education: Bangalore University (BE); Kansas State University (MS); Purdue University (PhD)
- Thesis: Numerical Simulation of Single Tube Heat Exchangers (1983)

Academic work
- Discipline: Mechanical engineering
- Institutions: Texas A&M University

Nagamangala Krishnamurthy Anand (born 1956) is a Texas A&M Regents Professor and the holder of Marcus C. Easterling Chair in the College of Engineering, Department of Mechanical Engineering, at Texas A&M University. He served as the interim dean of the College of Engineering after his appointment on September 1, 2011. His term as interim Dean ended on January 10, 2012, upon the succession of M. Katherine Banks. He was the Executive Associate Dean for the College of Engineering at Texas A&M, from 2009 to 2022, and the Associate Director of Texas A&M Engineering Experiment Station, from 2007 to 2022. In February 2022, Professor Anand was appointed as the Vice President for Faculty Affairs at Texas A&M University.

== Research Work ==
N. K. Anand's research focuses on the development and application of computational techniques to study fluid flow and heat transfer. In the past he has held James and Ada Forsyth and James Cain III professorships. Anand has published more than 100 technical articles, with a focus on thermodynamics, aerosol transport in nuclear power applications, and cooling strategies for electronic packages. In recognition of his overall technical contributions, Anand was named a fellow of the American Society of Mechanical Engineers (ASME) and has served as an associate technical editor of the association's Journal of Heat Transfer. Beyond his individual research, he has shaped the academic landscape as a co-author of the textbook "Finite Element and Finite Volume Methods for Heat Transfer and Fluid Dynamics" and through high-level leadership roles. He served as the co-editor of the Journal of Energy, Heat and Mass Transfer. In addition, he was a member of the editorial board for Numerical Heat Transfer and served as the chair of the ASME's K-20 Committee on Computational Heat Transfer. His career-long dedication to the field has been recognized with prestigious honors from the American Society of Mechanical Engineers (ASME), including the 2026 Edwin F. Church Medal.

== Education ==
- Ph.D. - Mechanical Engineering, Purdue University 1983
- M.S. - Mechanical Engineering, Kansas State University 1979
- B.E. - Mechanical Engineering, Bangalore University, India 1978

== Awards ==
- 2026 ASME Edwin F. Church Medal.
- 2020 ASME James Harry Potter Gold Medal.
- The Association of Former Students Texas A&M University, University Level Faculty Distinguished Achievement Award for Administration, 2018
- Regents Professor, Texas A&M University System, November 2014
- Inducted to Kansas State University Engineering Hall of Fame, Manhattan, Kansas, March 2011
- Outstanding Graduate Teaching Award, March 2009, The Department of Mechanical Engineering, Texas A&M University
- Distinguished Alumni presented by the B. M. S. American Alumni Association, B. M. S. College of Engineering, Bangalore, India, December 2008
- James and Ada Forsyth Professorship, 2007
- Charles W. Crawford Service Award, 2006
- The Association of Former Students Texas A&M University Faculty Distinguished Achievement in Teaching Award, 2001
