= G. Kemble Bennett =

Professor of engineering

Dean of the Dwight Look College of Engineering
- In office 2009 – August 31, 2011
- Preceded by: Kenneth L. Peddicord
- Succeeded by: N. K. Anand (Interim)
- In office September 28, 2002 – 2007
- Preceded by: John M. Niedzwecki (Acting)
- Succeeded by: Kenneth L. Peddicord

Personal details
- Born: George Kemble Bennett; April 2, 1940 (age 86) Jacksonville, Florida, U.S.
- Spouse: Jill Allen McMaster (m. 1982)
- Children: 3

Academic background
- Education: Florida State University (B.S.); San Jose University (M.S.); Texas Tech University (Ph.D.)
- Thesis: Smooth Empirical Bayes Estimation with Application to the Weibull Distribution (1970)

George Kemble Bennett (born April 2, 1940) is a senior professor of engineering in the College of Engineering at Texas A&M University. He has formerly served as the dean of the college with two non-consecutive terms. He is a fellow of the Institute of Industrial and Systems Engineers and of the International Society of Logistics.

== Education ==
Bennett received a Bachelors of Science degree in Mathematics with a minor in Chemistry from Florida State University in 1962. He received his Masters of Science in Engineering Mathematics from San Jose State University in 1968. He then received his Ph.D. in Industrial Engineering from Texas Tech University in 1970. His thesis was titled Smooth Empirical Bayes Estimation with Application to the Weibull Distribution.

== Career ==
Bennett served as Director of the Texas A&M Engineering Extension Service (TEEX); during his tenure he built "Disaster City®", one of the first training facilities dedicated to training first responders to handle mass casualty events.

In 2006, Bennett was appointed by then Texas Governor Rick Perry as a board chair, among other positions, on the Texas Board of Professional Engineers.

On August 31, 2011, Bennett stepped down as the Dean of the College of Engineering at Texas A&M University.

Currently, he is a senior professor in the Industrial & Systems Engineering department in the College of Engineering.

== Awards ==
- Frank and Lillian Gilbreth Industrial Engineering Award
