= Texas Task Force 2 Urban Search & Rescue =

Texas Task Force 2, abbreviated TX-TF2, functions as one of two state urban search and rescue (US&R) teams in the State of Texas. It is managed by the Texas A&M Engineering Extension Service and headquartered in Dallas, Texas.

== History ==
In 2004, the Dallas Fire-Rescue Department proposed the concept of developing a regional US&R team to the North Central Texas Council of Governments. Through the efforts of a committed group of people, a Type-3 US&R Task Force was formed and became operational on April 1, 2007. The team was designed to provide an immediate response anywhere within the 16 counties of the North Central Texas Council of Governments.

In the coming years, with the support of the Texas Division of Emergency Management TX-TF2 was able to enhance their capabilities to be able to respond as a Type-2 US&R Task Force anywhere in the State of Texas.

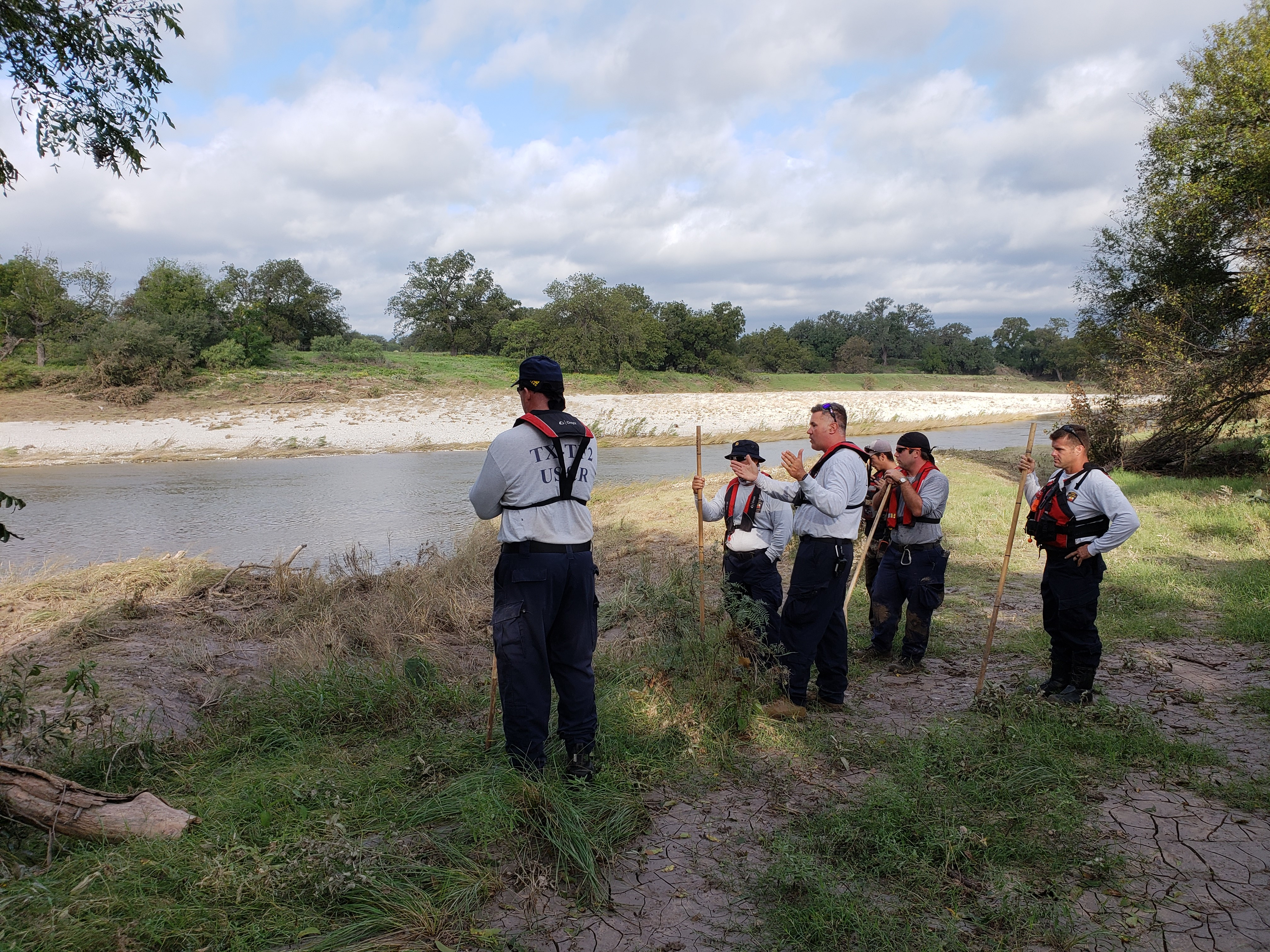
Members of Texas Task Force 2 conducting joint search and rescue operations following the catastrophic flooding along the Llano River near Junction, Texas in 2018.

== Deployments ==
Texas Task Force 2 personnel have responded to incidents such as the West Fertilizer Company explosion, Hurricane Dolly (2008), Hurricane Ike, Hurricane Harvey, and the Tornado outbreak of October 20–22, 2019 in Dallas. Here is a complete list of deployments.

== Composition ==
Texas Task Force 2 has the capability to deploy as a Type-2, Type-3, or Type-4 US&R Task Force. With a state-of-the-art equipment cache, TX-TF2 is self-sufficient for the first 72 hours of operation, and can function with support for up to 14 days under remote and austere conditions.

It is made up of responders from North Texas, all who reside within a three-hour window of Dallas, TX, and ready 24 hours a day to be mobilized and deployed anywhere in the state of Texas. Although many members are firefighters with volunteer and career departments, TX-TF2 is composed of individuals from various professional backgrounds such as fire, police, IT support, and engineering.

Texas Task Force 2 is also a member of the State Urban Search and Rescue Alliance (SUSAR) whose mission is to "support and conducts research, education, and informational activities to benefit the communities served by state-level US&R teams."

== See also ==
- Urban Search and Rescue Texas Task Force 1
