= Steve Owens (Arizona politician) =

American lawyer (born 1955)

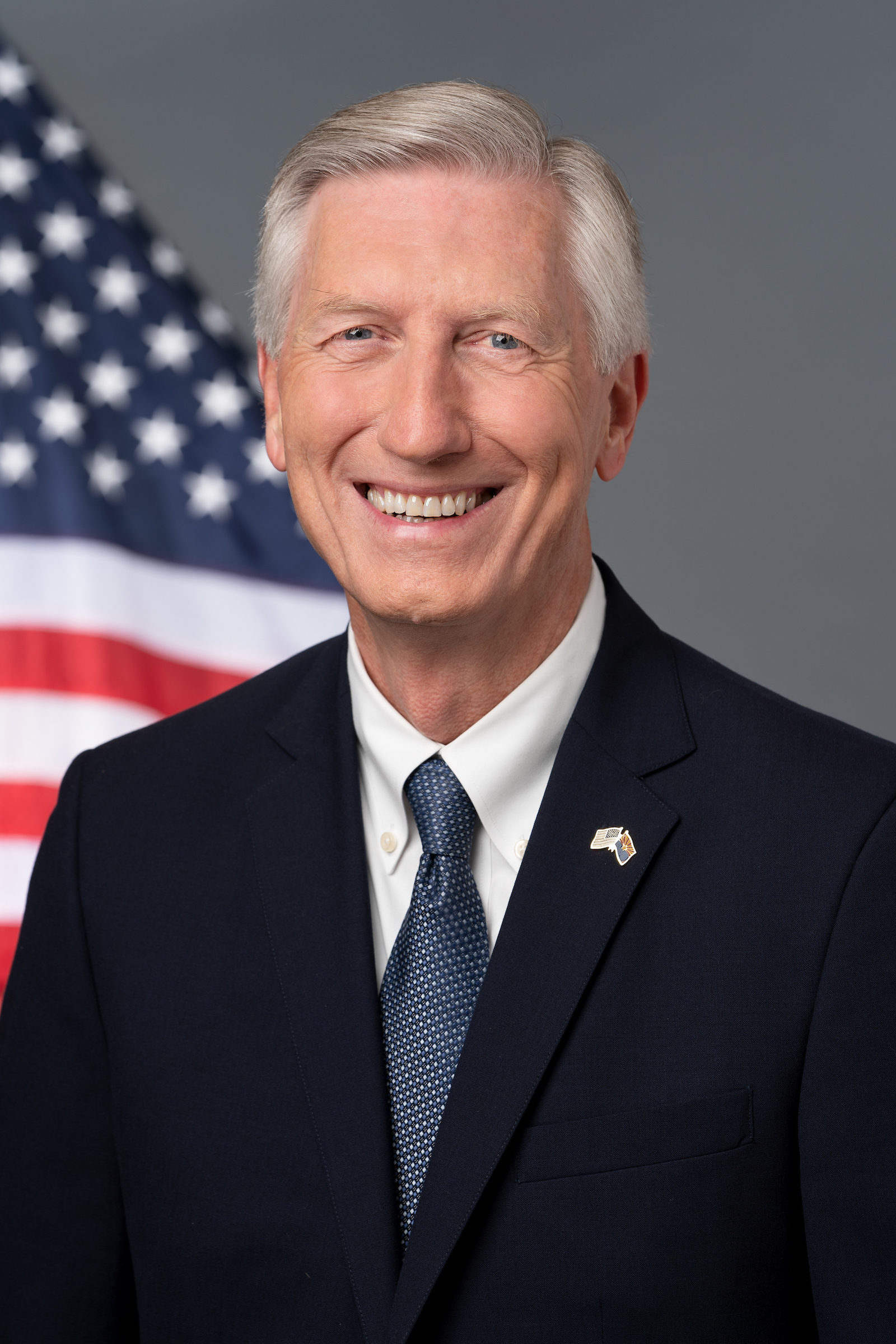

Chair of the U.S. Chemical Safety and Hazard Investigation Board
- Incumbent
- Assumed office: January 5, 2023; Acting: July 22, 2022 – January 5, 2023
- President: Joe Biden; Donald Trump
- Preceded by: Katherine Lemos

Member of the U.S. Chemical Safety and Hazard Investigation Board
- Incumbent
- Assumed office February 2, 2022
- President: Joe Biden; Donald Trump
- Preceded by: Richard J. Engler

Assistant Administrator of the Environmental Protection Agency for Toxic Substances
- In office July 2009 – November 2011
- President: Barack Obama

Director of the Arizona Department of Environmental Quality
- In office 2003–2009
- Governor: Janet Napolitano

Chair of the Arizona Democratic Party
- In office January 16, 1993 – July 15, 1995
- Preceded by: Bill Minette
- Succeeded by: Sam Coppersmith

Personal details
- Born: Stephen Alan Owens; August 19, 1955 (age 70) Memphis, Tennessee, U.S.
- Party: Democratic
- Spouse: Karen Carter (m. 1988)
- Education: Brown University (AB); Vanderbilt University (JD)

Stephen Alan Owens (born August 19, 1955) is an American attorney and politician. Originally from Memphis, Tennessee, he served as chief counsel and state director for U.S. Senator Al Gore before moving to the Phoenix, Arizona, area during Gore's unsuccessful presidential run in 1988. He was a fundraiser for the Clinton-Gore campaign in 1992, and, from 1993 to 1995, was chair of the Arizona Democratic Party. He was the Democratic nominee for Arizona's 6th congressional district in 1996 and 1998, losing both times to incumbent J. D. Hayworth.

Owens served as director of the Arizona Department of Environmental Quality from 2003 to 2009 under Governor Janet Napolitano, after which he was appointed by President Barack Obama to be Assistant Administrator of the U.S. Environmental Protection Agency for the Office of Prevention, Pesticides and Toxic Substances. After two years in Washington, he joined Squire Sanders (now Squire Patton Boggs) as a partner in their Phoenix office. Since February 2022, he has served as a member of the U.S. Chemical Safety and Hazard Investigation Board by appointment of President Joe Biden.

== Early life and family ==
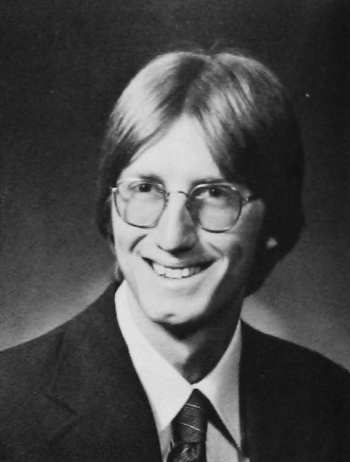
Owens in the 1978 Brown University yearbook

=== Childhood and education ===
Owens was born on August 19, 1955, in Memphis, Tennessee, to Milburne (1924–1995), a truck driver, and Maxine Neal Owens (1932–2019), who worked at Sears. He attended Messick High School, where he was elected by his peers as president of the class of 1973. Later, he was accepted into Brown University on an academic scholarship. While there, was an active member of the Undergraduate Council of Students, the school's student government. He won election as vice president in 1976 and as president the following year.

After five years at Brown, Owens graduated with honors with a degree in public policy in 1978. He then attended Vanderbilt University Law School, where he was editor-in-chief of the school's law review, graduating in 1981. He was admitted to the Tennessee bar later that year and spent a year as a law clerk to Judge Thomas A. Wiseman Jr. of the U.S. District Court for the Middle District of Tennessee.

=== Marriage ===
Owens married Karen Lynn Carter on November 12, 1988, at the Customs House in Nashville. The two knew each other at Vanderbilt Law and reconnected when Owens moved to Phoenix, Arizona, where Carter was practicing law with Janet Napolitano at Lewis & Roca. They went on to have two sons.

== Career ==
=== Gore staffer ===
Owens first met then-U.S. Representative Al Gore as a law student. In 1982, he moved to Washington, D.C. after Gore named him counsel to the House Science and Technology Committee's Subcommittee on Oversight and Investigations, which Gore chaired. During the 1984 U.S. Senate election, in which Gore handily defeated Republican state senator Victor Ashe, Owens served as his Shelby County campaign manager. In the Senate, he was Gore's chief counsel and later his state director.

In 1987, Gore kicked off his campaign for the following year's Democratic presidential nomination. Despite a relatively successful Super Tuesday, by April 1988, he was trailing far behind Michael Dukakis and Jesse Jackson. Owens, the campaign's Southern director, was dispatched to Phoenix to round up delegates ahead of the April 16 Arizona caucus and ended up staying in the state. He took an active role in state politics, working in 1992 as a fundraiser for the Clinton-Gore campaign, and, on January 16, 1993, he was elected chair of the Arizona Democratic Party, after incumbent Bill Minette declined to run for a second term. He won reelection in early 1995 but resigned in July of that year, in part to focus on a 1996 congressional run. He was succeeded by former congressman Sam Coppersmith.

=== Congressional campaigns ===
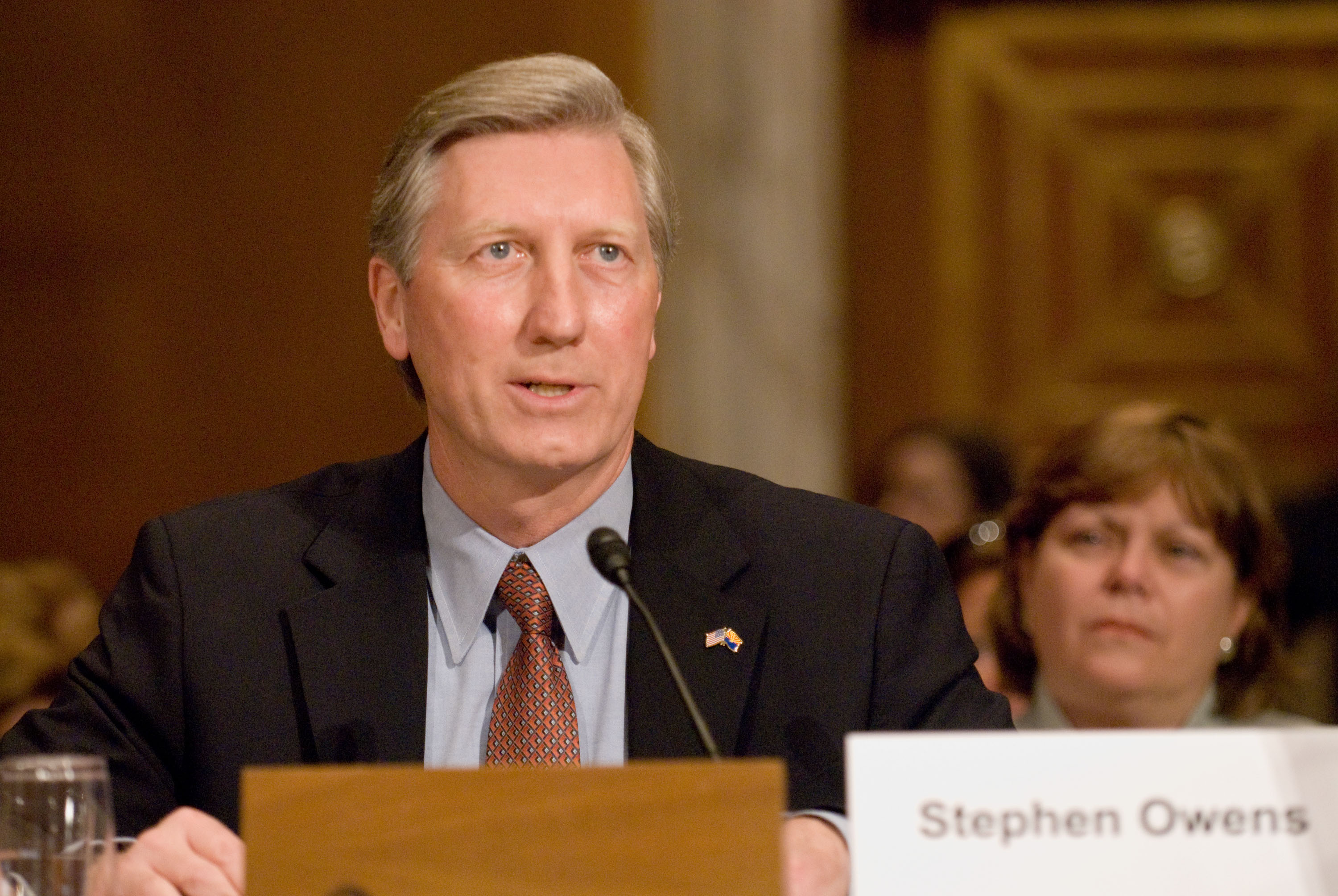
Owens testifying at his 2009 confirmation hearing

=== Environmental lawyer ===
After moving to Phoenix, Owens entered private practice, joining the law firm Brown & Bain as a regulatory attorney and registered lobbyist. Later, he joined Beshears Muchmore Wallwork. In 2003, when friend Janet Napolitano was sworn in as Governor of Arizona, she appointed Owens to serve as director of the state Department of Environmental Quality. Six years later, Napolitano and Owens were both tapped for jobs in the Obama administration: Napolitano as Secretary of Homeland Security and Owens as Assistant Administrator of the Environmental Protection Agency for the Office of Prevention, Pesticides and Toxic Substances. Owens left in 2011 to return to Arizona and become a partner with Squire Sanders (now Squire Patton Boggs).

In 2021, President Joe Biden nominated Owens to serve on the U.S. Chemical Safety and Hazard Investigation Board. Owens' nomination was confirmed by the Senate in December 2021, and he began service on February 2, 2022. Following the resignation of Katherine Lemos in July 2022, President Biden appointed Owens as interim executive authority, and nominated him as chair of the board. On November 17, 2022, the United States Senate Committee on Environment and Public Works held hearings on his nomination. On December 13, 2022, the United States Senate discharged the committee from further consideration of the nomination by unanimous consent agreement, and confirmed the nomination by voice vote.

Political offices
Preceded by Bill Minette	Chair of the Arizona Democratic Party; 1993–1995	Succeeded by Sam Coppersmith
