= West Independent School District =

School district in Texas, US

West Independent School District is a school district based in West, Texas United States.

In addition to West, the district serves the towns of Leroy and Ross in northern McLennan County. A small portion of Hill County lies within the district.

== History ==
In 2009, the school district was rated "academically acceptable" by the Texas Education Agency.

On April 17, 2013, an explosion at the West Fertilizer Plant leveled several blocks of West and caused fires to spread across several blocks, including West Middle School. All five schools were shut down for the remaining week.

== Schools ==
- West High School (Grades 9-12)
  - School mascot: Trojan
  - 1963 Class AA girls basketball state champions
  - 1999 Class AAA baseball state champions
  - 2015 Class AAA baseball state champions
  - 2016 Class AAA softball state champions
  - 2016 Class AAA baseball state champions
- West Middle School (Grades 6-8)
- West Elementary School (Grades PK-5)
- Brookhaven Boys Ranch
