= Katherine Lemos =

American safety professional

Katherine Andrea Lemos
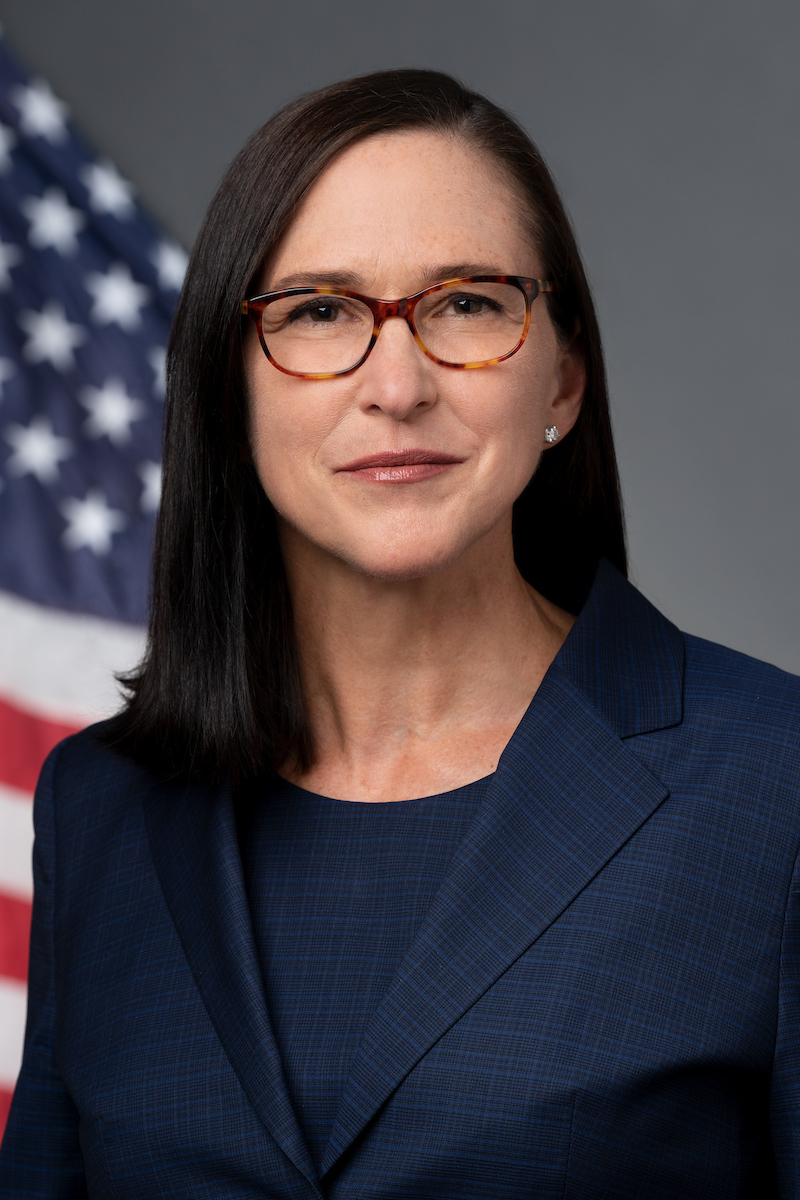
- Official portrait, 2021

Chair of the U.S. Chemical Safety and Hazard Investigation Board
- In office April 23, 2020 – July 22, 2022
- President: Donald Trump; Joe Biden
- Preceded by: Vanessa Allen Sutherland; Kristen Kulinowski (acting)
- Succeeded by: Steve Owens

Personal details
- Born: 1967–1968
- Citizenship: United States
- Spouse: Carlos Lemos
- Education: Belmont University (BBA); California Lutheran University (MS); University of Iowa (PhD)

Katherine Andrea Lemos is an American safety professional and the former chairperson and CEO of the U.S. Chemical Safety and Hazard Investigation Board (CSB).

== Early life ==
Katherine Lemos was born to John Curtis and Laura Curtis. Her father was a United States Air Force and Air National Guard pilot and a commercial airline pilot. Lemos started flight lessons at the age of fourteen, at which time her father required her to read National Transportation Safety Board publications to learn about aviation safety and accidents.

Lemos earned a B.B.A. in business management from Belmont University, a M.S. in behavioral counseling from California Lutheran University, and a Ph.D. in social psychology from University of Iowa. She also worked as a postdoctoral researcher at University of Iowa Operator Performance Laboratory and as a NASA Faculty Fellow at Langley Research Center.

Lemos is a pilot and certified flight instructor.

== Career ==
Prior to her appointment to CSB, Lemos worked at Northrop Grumman from 2014 to 2020, serving as the company's director of autonomy and director of programs for the aerospace sector. She had previously worked as a technical leader and program manager for aviation safety at the Federal Aviation Administration and as an accident investigator and later Special Assistant to Vice Chairman of the Board of the National Transportation Safety Board. She had also held academic positions at University of Maryland and Instituto Tecnológico de Aeronáutica.

Lemos has specialized in system safety, accident investigation, and human factors. At the time she was nominated to CSB, she had no experience in chemical manufacturing or refinery operations, fields which fall under the purview of CSB investigation.

== Chemical Safety Board ==
Katherine Lemos was nominated by President Donald Trump to be a member of CSB on June 13, 2019. On July 22, she was nominated by President Trump to serve concurrent five-year appointments as chairperson and CEO of CSB. At the time, the CSB's five-seat board had only three members, one of whom would leave in December 2019. The problem of vacancies in the CSB board was noted by a May 2019 Environmental Protection Agency Office of Inspector General report to be detrimental to CSB's ability to function effectively.

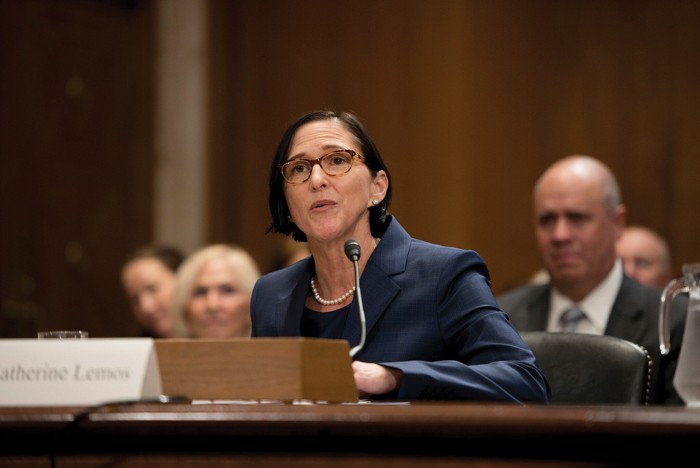
Katherine Lemos at Senate Committee on Environment and Public Works hearing

A hearing on her nomination was held by the United States Senate Committee on Environment and Public Works in September 2019. Lemos received bipartisan support from committee members during her nomination. Her appointment was confirmed by the Senate by unanimous consent on March 23, 2020. Senator John Barrasso said "it was critical the Senate confirm Dr. Lemos to provide a working quorum to the board"; at the time of Lemos's confirmation, the CSB board had only one member, Kristen Kulinowski, and only eight investigators. She began her tenure on April 23, 2020.

Four days after Lemos's term began, Kulinowski announced that she would resign from CSB on May 1, ending the CSB's brief quorum. At this time, CSB had ten unfilled investigator positions. Thereafter, Lemos declared that she could operate as a "quorum of one", citing a legal opinion from the CSB general counsel allowing her to unilaterally run the CSB. A July 2020 Environmental Protection Agency Office of Inspector General report concluded that it remained an open question whether a single CSB board member may constitute a quorum, as doing so would impair the segregation of duties mandated by the Government Accountability Office.

In May 2021, Public Employees for Environmental Responsibility criticized Lemos for accruing $33,000 in travel expenses and $20,000 in office renovations, and for hiring a senior advisor from Northrop Grumman for an undisclosed salary.

In a September 2021 hearing before the United States House Energy Subcommittee on Oversight and Investigations, Lemos testified that the CSB is "on an upward trend". She said that she intended to expand the staff of CSB to 61 people by September 2023.

In September 2021, the Senate Committee on Environment and Public Works approved the nominations of three new board members of the CSB, and in December 2021, two members were confirmed, Steve Owens and Sylvia Johnson. Once seated on the board in February 2022, Owens and Johnson openly disagreed with changes Lemos approved to a board order, which resulted in an expansion of the chairperson's authority. They attempted a procedural vote to make further changes to the order, but Lemos tabled the vote for a public meeting, which ultimately did not occur due to her resignation.

Lemos submitted her letter of resignation to the White House in June 2022, citing lost confidence in the board's focus on the agency's mission. Her resignation became effective on July 22, 2022.

In June 2023, the EPA Inspector General released a report stating that Lemos violated federal regulations for her use of board funds for travel, office refurbishment, and media training, but did not violate restrictions placed by a continuing resolution and did not violate regulations for the hiring of senior aides. Senator Chuck Grassley wrote a letter to Lemos requesting that she repay the money indicated as improperly spent in the report.
