= United States Chemical Safety and Hazard Investigation Board =

Independent U.S. federal agency

- Seal

- Logo

Agency overview
- Formed: January 1998
- Jurisdiction: United States federal government
- Headquarters: Suite 604 470 L'Enfant Plaza Washington, D.C., 20026
- Agency executive: Steve Owens, Chair
- Website: www.csb.gov

YouTube information
- Channel: USCSB
- Subscribers: 425,000

The United States Chemical Safety and Hazard Investigation Board (USCSB), abbreviated as the Chemical Safety Board (CSB), is an independent agency of the United States federal government charged with investigating industrial chemical accidents. Headquartered in Washington, D.C., the agency's board members are appointed by the president and confirmed by the United States Senate. The CSB conducts root cause investigations of chemical accidents at fixed industrial facilities.

== History ==
The United States Chemical Safety and Hazard Investigation Board (CSB) was authorized by the Clean Air Act Amendments of 1990 and became operational in January 1998. According to the Senate legislative history, the board’s main role is to investigate chemical accidents, determine their causes, and help prevent similar incidents. The United States Congress gave the CSB an independent mandate, specifying that no other agency or executive branch official may direct its activities.

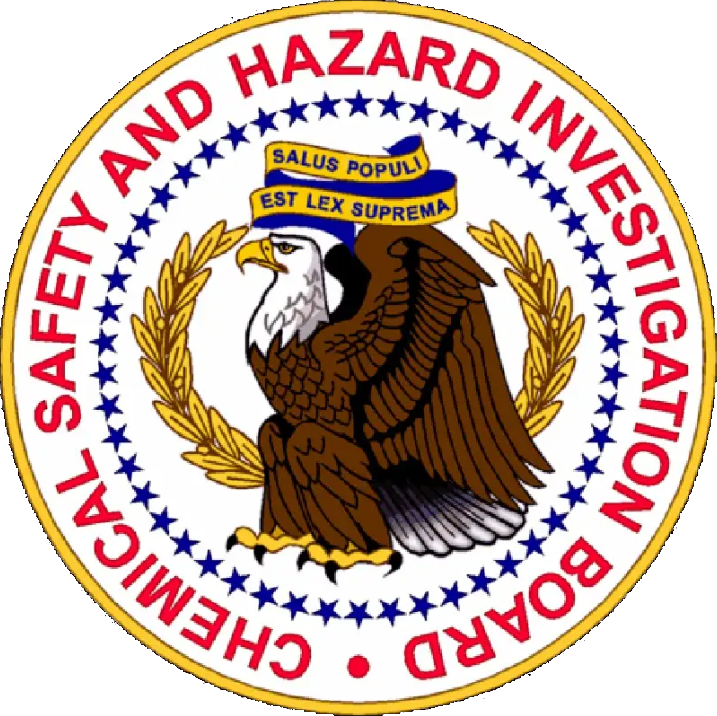
Seal of the CSB (1998-2003)

Following the successful model of the National Transportation Safety Board and the Department of Transportation, Congress directed that the CSB's investigative function be completely independent of the rulemaking, inspection, and enforcement authorities of the Environmental Protection Agency and Occupational Safety and Health Administration. Congress recognized that board investigations would identify chemical hazards that were not addressed by those agencies. Also similarly to the National Transportation Safety Board, the CSB performs "investigations [that] identify the root causes of chemical incidents and share these findings broadly across industries to prevent future incidents."

Following criticism from lawmakers and allegations of mismanagement, the former chairman of the CSB, Rafael Moure-Eraso, resigned in March 2015. He was replaced by Vanessa Allen Sutherland in August 2015. Sutherland resigned with two years left in her five-year term after the Trump administration proposed shutting down the CSB as part of the 2019 United States federal budget which ultimately would not occur.

In 2025, President Donald Trump announced plans to defund and close the CSB by 2026, citing overlapping capabilities of the United States Environmental Protection Agency and the United States Department of Labor's Occupational Safety and Health Administration, but was rebuffed by the United States Congress, which passed additional agency funding following a government shutdown.

On September 30, 2026, the CSB uploaded a video with a new narrator, Sam Witwer. Sheldon Smith, the previous narrator, retired from narrating their videos after twenty years. This video is of their investigation and findings into the BP-Husky refinery fire that occurred September 20, 2022, which fatally injured two workers.

== Leadership ==
The board consists of five members who are appointed by the president with the advice and consent of the Senate. The terms of office are five years. The president designates one of the members as chairperson, again with the advice and consent of the Senate. The chairperson is the chief executive officer of the board, and exercises the executive and administrative functions of the board.

=== Chairs ===
No.	Portrait	Director	Took office	Left office	Refs.
1		Paul L. Hill, Jr.	October 7, 1994	January 12, 2000	
2		Carolyn W. Merritt	August 2002	August 2, 2007	
3		John S. Bresland	March 14, 2008	June 2010	
4		Rafael Moure-Eraso	June 23, 2010	March 26, 2015	
5		Vanessa Allen Sutherland	August 2015	June 2018	
6		Katherine A. Lemos	April 23, 2020	July 22, 2022	
7		Steve Owens	January 5, 2023	present	

=== Current members ===
The current board members as of July 31, 2025:

Position	Name	Party	Took office	Term expires
Chair	Steve Owens	Democratic	February 3, 2022 (as member); January 5, 2023 (as chair)	February 3, 2027
Member	Sylvia E. Johnson	Democratic	February 3, 2022	February 3, 2027
Member	Vacant	—N/a	—	
Member	Vacant	—N/a	—	
Member	Vacant	—N/a	—	

== Investigations ==
The CSB's animated explanation of the Deepwater Horizon explosion

Since its establishment in 1998, the CSB has investigated many major industrial chemical accidents in the United States. The agency is known for its detailed technical analyses of incidents and for its transparent communication practices. These often include in-depth reconstructions of events, root cause analyses, and safety recommendations. Unusually for a government agency, the CSB frequently produces video reports featuring narrated explanations and high-quality computer animations. Their videos were narrated by Sheldon Smith, who retired in 2026 and was replaced by Sam Witwer.

The agency publishes its videos on a public YouTube channel, which as of December 2025 has over 400,000 subscribers. The CSB's videos have been lauded for their quality, with experts encouraging their use in teaching process safety fundamentals.

USCSB's notable investigations include:

- Texas City refinery explosion, March 2005
- Xcel Energy Cabin Creek Hydroelectric Plant Fire, October 2007
- Port Wentworth Imperial Sugar plant explosion, February 2008
- Deepwater Horizon explosion, 2010
- Chevron Refinery fire, August 6, 2012
- West, TX, Fertilizer Fire and Explosion, April 17, 2013
- Husky Superior Refinery Explosion and Fire, April 26, 2018
- Philadelphia Energy Solutions refinery explosion, June 21, 2019

== See also ==
- Occupational Safety and Health Administration
- United States Environmental Protection Agency
