= West High School (Texas) =

Location
- 1008 Jerry Mashek Drive; West, Texas 76691-1141; United States; 31.811632°N 97.093496°W

Information
- School type: Public high school
- School district: West Independent School District
- Principal: Connor Browning
- Teaching staff: 34.80 (FTE)
- Grades: 9–12
- Enrollment: 383 (2023–2024)
- Student to teacher ratio: 11.01
- Colors: Red, Black & White
- Athletics conference: UIL Class 3A
- Mascot: Trojan
- Website: West High School

West High School is a public high school located in West, Texas, and classified as a 3A school by the University Interscholastic League (UIL). It is part of the West Independent School District located in northern McLennan County. In 2015, the school was rated "Met Standard" by the Texas Education Agency.

The campus was heavily damaged in the April 2013 West Fertilizer Company explosion and demolition of the school building began in mid-December 2013. Classes were held at a temporary site until the new West High School campus opened in 2015.

== Athletics ==
The West Trojans compete in these sports:

- Baseball
- Basketball
- Cross Country
- Football
- Powerlifting
- Softball
- Track and field
- Volleyball

=== State titles ===
West (UIL)

- Baseball
  - 1999(3A), 2015(3A), 2016(3A)
- Softball
  - 2016(3A)
- Girls Basketball
  - 1963(2A)

West Dunbar (PVIL)

- Football
  - 1959(PVIL-1A)
- Boys Track
  - 1953(PVIL-1A)
- Girls Track
  - 1957(PVIL-1A)

== Notable alumni ==
- Bailey Horn, MLB player
- Scott Podsednik (class of 1994), MLB player; outfielder for the champion 2005 Chicago White Sox
