= Leroy, Texas =

- City
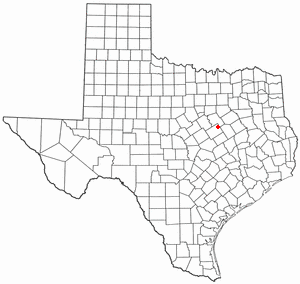
- Location of Leroy, Texas

- Coordinates: 31°44′35″N 97°01′38″W
- Country: United States
- State: Texas
- County: McLennan

Area
  - Total: 1.89 sq mi (4.89 km^{2})
  - Land: 1.88 sq mi (4.88 km^{2})
  - Water: 0.0039 sq mi (0.01 km^{2})
- Elevation: 499 ft (152 m)

Population (2020)
  - Total: 354
  - Density: 188/sq mi (72.5/km^{2})
- Time zone: UTC-6 (Central (CST))
  - Summer (DST): UTC-5 (CDT)
- ZIP code: 76654
- Area code: 254
- FIPS code: 48-42400
- GNIS feature ID: 2410823

Leroy is a city in McLennan County, Texas, United States. The population was 354 at the 2020 census. It is part of the Waco Metropolitan Statistical Area.

== Geography ==
According to the United States Census Bureau, the city has a total area of 1.9 square miles (4.9 km^{2}), all land.

== Demographics ==
Historical population
Census	Pop.	Note	%±
1980	253		—
1990	292		15.4%
2000	335		14.7%
2010	337		0.6%
2020	354		5.0%
U.S. Decennial Census; 2020 Census

=== 2020 census ===
As of the 2020 census, Leroy had a population of 354. The median age was 41.6 years. 22.3% of residents were under the age of 18 and 17.5% of residents were 65 years of age or older. For every 100 females there were 96.7 males, and for every 100 females age 18 and over there were 96.4 males.

0.0% of residents lived in urban areas, while 100.0% lived in rural areas.

There were 131 households in Leroy, of which 41.2% had children under the age of 18 living in them. Of all households, 60.3% were married-couple households, 15.3% were households with a male householder and no spouse or partner present, and 17.6% were households with a female householder and no spouse or partner present. About 16.1% of all households were made up of individuals and 7.6% had someone living alone who was 65 years of age or older.

There were 141 housing units, of which 7.1% were vacant. The homeowner vacancy rate was 0.0% and the rental vacancy rate was 0.0%.

Racial composition as of the 2020 census
Race	Number	Percent
White	303	85.6%
Black or African American	8	2.3%
American Indian and Alaska Native	1	0.3%
Asian	0	0.0%
Native Hawaiian and Other Pacific Islander	0	0.0%
Some other race	23	6.5%
Two or more races	19	5.4%
Hispanic or Latino (of any race)	53	15.0%

=== 2000 census ===
As of the 2000 census, there were 335 people, 121 households, and 86 families residing in the city. The population density was 175.7 inhabitants per square mile (67.8/km^{2}). There were 134 housing units at an average density of 70.3 per square mile (27.1/km^{2}). The racial makeup of the city was 93.13% White, 4.48% African American, 1.79% from other races, and 0.60% from two or more races. Hispanic or Latino of any race were 2.09% of the population.

There were 121 households, out of which 28.9% had children under the age of 18 living with them, 62.8% were married couples living together, 7.4% had a female householder with no husband present, and 28.9% were non-families. 24.8% of all households were made up of individuals, and 12.4% had someone living alone who was 65 years of age or older. The average household size was 2.72 and the average family size was 3.20.

In the city, the population was spread out, with 23.9% under the age of 18, 9.9% from 18 to 24, 28.7% from 25 to 44, 20.9% from 45 to 64, and 16.7% who were 65 years of age or older. The median age was 39 years. For every 100 females, there were 105.5 males. For every 100 females age 18 and over, there were 109.0 males.

The median income for a household in the city was $40,500, and the median income for a family was $45,875. Males had a median income of $30,625 versus $21,058 for females. The per capita income for the city was $16,970. About 6.9% of families and 6.3% of the population were below the poverty line, including none of those under age 18 and 28.1% of those age 65 or over.

== Education ==
The City of Leroy is served by the West Independent School District.
