= West Fertilizer Company explosion =

2013 explosion of ammonium nitrate in Texas, USA

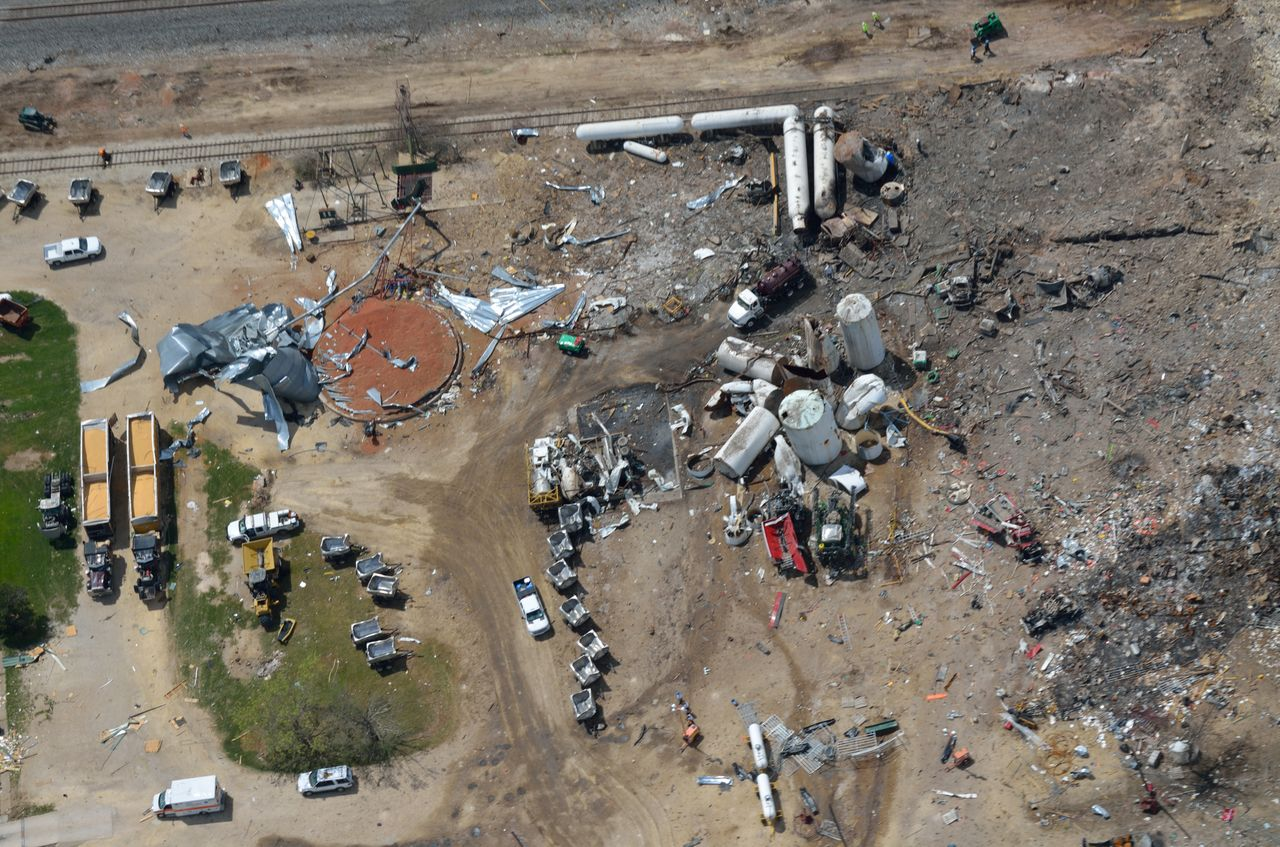
- Explosion site several days after the event
- Date: April 17, 2013; 13 years ago
- Time: 7:50:38 p.m. CDT (UTC−05:00)
- Location: West Fertilizer Co., 1471 Jerry Mashek Drive, West, Texas, U.S.; 31.816°N 97.088°W
- Cause: Unknown, possibly arson (disputed)
- Deaths: 15
- Injuries: Approximately 160–200
- Property damage: West Fertilizer Company building obliterated, 60–80 homes destroyed, 50–75 homes damaged, 50-unit apartment building destroyed, West Middle School damaged, West Volunteer Ambulance Station and nursing home
- Convictions: None

On April 17, 2013, an ammonium nitrate explosion occurred at the West Fertilizer Company storage and distribution facility in West, Texas, United States (18 miles (29 km) north of Waco), while emergency services personnel were responding to a fire there. Fifteen people were killed, over 160 injured, and more than 150 buildings damaged or destroyed. Investigators confirmed that ammonium nitrate was the material that exploded. On May 11, 2016, the Bureau of Alcohol, Tobacco, Firearms and Explosives stated that the fire was deliberately set. That finding has been disputed.

== Background ==
West Fertilizer Company had supplied chemicals to farmers since its founding in 1962. As of 2013 it was owned by Adair Grain, Inc. and employed nine workers at the facility. Adair Grain, Inc. is wholly owned by Donald Adair and his wife Wanda.

At the time of the incident, the Occupational Safety and Health Administration (OSHA) last inspected the plant in 1985. According to records obtained by the Associated Press, OSHA cited the plant for improper storage of anhydrous ammonia and fined it $30. OSHA could have fined the company as much as $1,000. OSHA also cited the plant for violations of respiratory protection standards but imposed no fine. OSHA officials said the facility was not on their "National Emphasis Plan" for chemical plant inspections, because it was considered an exempt "retail facility" under an interpretation of OSHA's Process Safety Management standard, the plant had no record of a major accident, and the Environmental Protection Agency did not consider it a major risk.

Map of West, Texas

After a complaint in 2006 about an ammonia smell coming from the facility, the Texas Commission on Environmental Quality investigated and cited the operator for lacking a permit for two storage tanks containing anhydrous ammonia. A permit was issued once the operators brought the facility into accord with agency regulations and recommendations. Also in 2006, the EPA fined the owners $2,300 for problems including not filing a risk management program plan on time. In June 2012, the US Department of Transportation's Pipeline and Hazardous Materials Safety Administration further fined the facility $5,250 for violations regarding anhydrous ammonia storage.

According to an open records request by Reuters, the plant had a long history of minor thefts, presumably by people wanting to use anhydrous ammonia to make methamphetamine. The facility lacked burglar alarms or a fenced perimeter. It installed a surveillance system in 2009 after law enforcement recommended it do so.

In an emergency planning report filed with the EPA in 2011, company officials said the anhydrous ammonia storage tanks did not represent a significant fire or explosion hazard. Indeed, the tanks were still intact following the nearby fire and explosion.

According to its last filing with the EPA in late 2012, the company stated that it stored 540,000 pounds (270 short tons; 240 t) of ammonium nitrate and 110,000 pounds (50 t) of anhydrous ammonia on the site. A week after the explosion, Homeland Security Secretary Janet Napolitano told Senate investigators that the company did not appear to have disclosed its ammonium nitrate stock to her department. Federal law requires that the Department of Homeland Security (DHS) be notified when anyone has more than one ton of ammonium nitrate on hand, or 400 pounds (180 kg) if the ammonium nitrate is combined with combustible material.

== Fire and explosion ==
External videos
- "Dangerously Close: Explosion in West, Texas". U.S. Chemical Safety and Hazard Investigation Board safety video about the fire and explosion at the West Fertilizer Company in West, Texas

The facility caught fire on Wednesday, April 17, 2013, and roughly 20 minutes after it was first reported to emergency dispatchers, the site exploded. At 7:50:38 p.m. CDT (00:50 UTC, April 18), as firefighters were attempting to douse the flames, it exploded – actually two explosions milliseconds apart – with the force of 7.5-10 tons of TNT. The explosion created a 93-foot-wide (28 m) and 12-foot-deep (3.7 m) crater where the fertilizer plant had been, and resulted in 15 deaths and at least 200 injuries.

After weeks of investigation, the cause of the initial fire remained unknown; authorities ruled out weather, natural causes, anhydrous ammonia, and ammonium nitrate in a rail car as possible causes. In May 2016, the ATF announced that they had determined the fire had been deliberately set. This finding is widely disputed, however; there were no named suspects or arrests made, leading to legal and forensic experts criticizing the ATF investigation.

== Aftermath ==
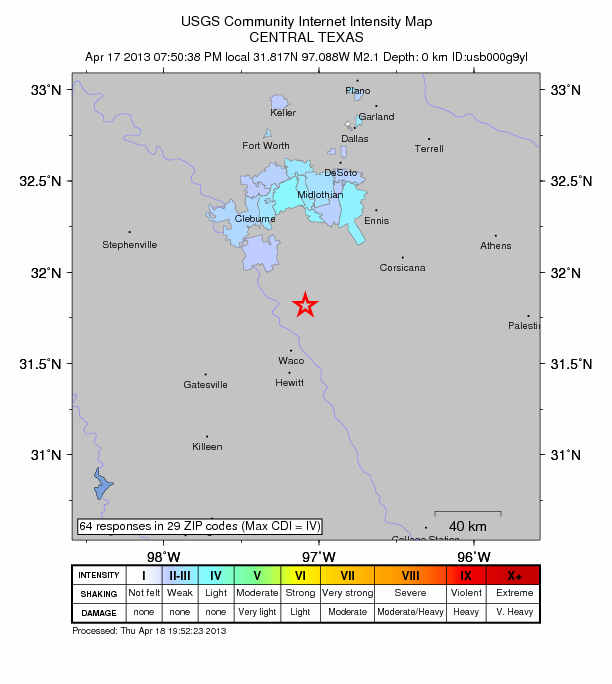
USGS ground level intensity map for the event

The massive explosion obliterated the West Fertilizer Company plant and caused heavy damage and further destruction to surrounding areas.

=== Damage ===
In addition to the obliterated plant, damaged buildings included the public West Middle School, which sits next to the facility. A neighboring 50-unit, two-story apartment building was destroyed.

The blast damaged the nearby West Rest Haven nursing home, and many residents were evacuated. Many nursing home residents received cuts from flying glass, but emergency personnel on scene judged that most such injuries were not life-threatening.

On April 20, some residents who tried to return to their destroyed homes were turned away, because leaking gas tanks were causing small fires.

According to the company's insurer, United States Fire Insurance of Morristown, New Jersey, the facility was only covered by $1 million in liability insurance. According to official estimates from both state and company officials, this amount did not even begin to cover the cost of damages. Furthermore, according to The Dallas Morning News, Texas law allows fertilizer storage facilities to operate without liability insurance, even when they store hazardous materials.

=== Injuries and fatalities ===
West Mayor Tommy Muska told the Waco Tribune-Herald that as of late evening, April 17, six or seven volunteer firefighters from the city were unaccounted for. West EMS Director Dr. George Smith, himself injured, said he believed at least two emergency responders were killed.

"We do have confirmed fatalities," Texas Department of Public Safety spokesman D.L. Wilson said at a midnight news conference on April 17. "We have a tremendous amount of injuries ... over 100 injuries at this time." Wilson did not confirm or deny an earlier report deaths could number in the range of 60 to 70. He said the blast zone was "just like the Murrah Building in Oklahoma City," comparing its effects to the Oklahoma City bombing, and that "50 to 75" homes and businesses were damaged. Sergeant William Patrick Swanton of the Waco Police Department said the operation had entered "search-and-rescue mode" to find survivors and recover those perhaps trapped in buildings. He said at least 160 people were injured, and the firefighters combatting the initial fire were still unaccounted for. Swanton quoted local environmental officials and emergency personnel in saying there was no risk to the community from the smoke fumes rising from the facility.

Over 100 people were reported injured in the blast, and were originally transported to a makeshift triage set up at West High School's football field. The triage site later was moved to a community center due to the football field's proximity to the still-burning facility. Hillcrest Baptist Medical Center in Waco received over 40 injured for treatment. Patients were also admitted to Waco's Providence Healthcare Network, Fort Worth's John Peter Smith Health Network, Dallas's Parkland Memorial Hospital, and Temple's Scott and White Memorial Hospital.

Authorities announced on April 19 that twelve bodies had been recovered, sixty people were missing, and at least 200 had been injured. The 12 dead included 10 first responders as well as two civilians who had volunteered to fight the fire.

The final confirmed death toll was 15 fatalities, and approximately 160 to 200 people were injured.

== Reactions ==
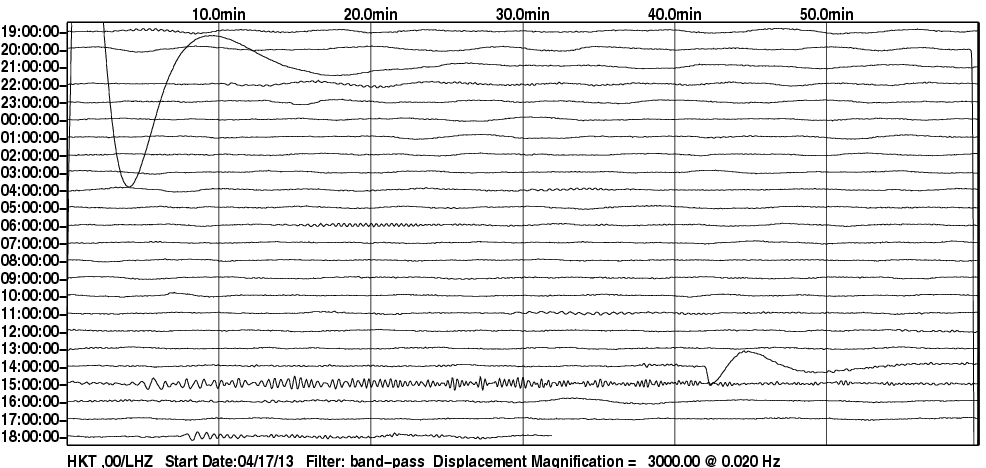
Seismograph reading from Hockley, Texas, 142 miles (229 km) south-east of West, clearly displaying the temblor caused by the explosion

Those living in and around West report that the blast felt like an earthquake. The United States Geological Survey recorded the explosion as a 2.1-magnitude tremor. The blast was heard in nearby Hillsboro, Waxahachie, DeSoto, and as far north as Arlington. Windows were blown out in Abbott, 7 miles (11 km) NNE of West.

Texas Governor Rick Perry issued a statement on the evening of April 17:

We are monitoring developments and gathering information as details continue to emerge about this incident. We have also mobilized state resources to help local authorities. Our thoughts and prayers are with the people of West, and the first responders on the scene.

President Barack Obama issued his own statement on April 18:

Today our prayers go out to the people of West, Texas in the aftermath of last night's deadly explosion at a fertilizer plant. A tight-knit community has been shaken, and good, hard-working people have lost their lives. I want to thank the first responders who worked tirelessly through the night to contain the situation and treat the wounded. My Administration, through FEMA and other agencies, is in close contact with our state and local partners on the ground to make sure there are no unmet needs as search and rescue and response operations continue. West is a town that many Texans hold near and dear to their hearts, and as residents continue to respond to this tragedy, they will have the support of the American people.

Due to toxic fumes and a large number of displaced families, West Independent School District announced on its Twitter feed that all five of the district's schools would stay closed until further notice. They reopened on April 22. Nearby school districts Abbott Independent School District (ISD) and Penelope ISD also closed their schools for a day.

Waco Police indicated that they would treat the explosion site as a crime scene out of caution. The U.S. Bureau of Alcohol, Tobacco, Firearms and Explosives announced on the morning of April 18 that it would send a national response team—including fire investigators, explosive experts, chemists, and canine units—to investigate the site. The U.S. Chemical Safety and Hazard Investigation Board, an independent federal agency that investigates accidents involving industrial chemicals, also dispatched a major investigation team to West to begin searching for the cause of the disaster.

Urban Search and Rescue Texas Task Force 1 and Texas Task Force 2 Urban Search and Rescue deployed on the morning of April 18 to assist in search and rescue. An incident management team from the Texas A&M Forest Service was also deployed, as was the Veterinary Emergency Team from Texas A&M College of Veterinary Medicine & Biomedical Sciences.

Governor Perry declared McLennan County a disaster area, and on April 22, President Obama issued an Emergency Declaration, which afforded the state aid with 75% federal funding. On April 18, the Texas National Guard sent members of the 6th Civil Support Team to the area to test the air quality and assess chemical and biological hazards.

On June 13, 2013, the Federal Emergency Management Agency (FEMA) declined additional aid to the town, based in large part on the ability of the state of Texas to provide the necessary funds to rebuild. However, on August 2, 2013, FEMA reversed its original decision and approved a major disaster declaration for West.

In 2015, David Schechter of WFAA-TV created a news documentary, titled Rise Up, West: Recovery Starts on the 50-Yard Line, about the plant's explosion. Schechter's piece won an Edward R. Murrow Award.

== Investigation ==
The state fire marshal department said that investigators interviewed "almost 300 people," and followed 160 leads in their initial investigation.

In May 2013, the Texas Department of Public Safety instructed the Texas Rangers and the McLennan Sheriff's Department to join the Texas Fire Marshal's Office and the U.S. Bureau of Alcohol, Tobacco, Firearms and Explosives, in the criminal investigation into the explosion.

Investigators blamed stocks of ammonium nitrate fertilizer stored in a bin inside a seed and fertilizer building on the property for the explosion but failed to identify what started the actual fire that led to the explosion.

On April 22, 2014, the U.S. Chemical Safety and Hazard Investigation Board released preliminary results of its investigation into the explosion. It found that company officials did not safely store the chemicals in its stockpile, and that federal, state and local regulations governing the handling of hazardous materials were inadequate. In a statement released with the report, the board's chair, Dr. Rafael Moure-Eraso, stated: "The fire and explosion at West Fertilizer was preventable. It should never have occurred. It resulted from the failure of a company to take the necessary steps to avert a preventable fire and explosion and from the inability of federal, state and local regulatory agencies to identify a serious hazard and correct it." The CSB's yearlong investigation found that 1,351 facilities across the country store ammonium nitrate, and that their many areas had no regulations to keep such facilities away from populated areas. Moure-Eraso urged new and revised regulations, stating "there is no substitute for an efficient regulatory system that ensures that all companies are operating to the same high standards. We cannot depend on voluntary compliance."

The ATF announced on May 11, 2016, that the fire that led to the explosion was intentionally set. They declined to comment about any possible suspect, though a reward of $50,000 for information leading to an arrest has been offered. This finding was subsequently disputed by various other experts, who noted that it was based primarily on ATF's inability to find any other cause for the initial fire. Some people complained that it delayed victims' lawsuits against the fertilizer company, gave the defendants more legal ammunition, and prompted the U.S. Environmental Protection Agency to put a hold on new chemical plant safety rules.

The Waco-McLennan County Public Health District in collaboration with the Texas Department of State Health Services carried out and completed an epidemiological study to describe the physical injuries related to the incident. The report was issued in June 2014 and the study was later published as a scientific manuscript in 2016.

=== Regulatory changes ===
One year later, in 2014, the Wall Street Journal reported that fertilizer storage regulations in the U.S. were unchanged.

In 2015, the Texas Legislature passed House Bill 942 regulating storage and inspection of ammonium nitrate and granting authority to the Texas Commission on Environmental Quality and local fire marshals to effect and enforce such regulation.

=== Lawsuits ===
At least seven lawsuits were filed against facility owner Adair Grain Inc. On October 11, 2015, a day before jury selection was to begin, parties reached a partial settlement in one case. Its terms have not been disclosed. The settlement includes the families of the three civilians killed in the fire and explosion. This is separate from the $118,300 in fines that West Fertilizer was issued for violating several rules about the handling of hazardous materials.

A trial for a second group of plaintiffs was expected to begin in late 2016.

In January 2018, it was reported that the city of West will receive $10.44 million in settlements with defendants in the litigation around the plant explosion, the West City Council approved the settlement, which includes funds for damages not covered by insurance or grants from state or federal agencies. The lawsuit that the settlement pertains to, was filed on behalf of the city and claimed the defendants were negligent in selling or distributing the ammonium nitrate based fertilizer, that they failed to properly warn of the dangers associated with the handling and storage of the product, and should have never sold the product to West Fertilizer.

== Memorial ==
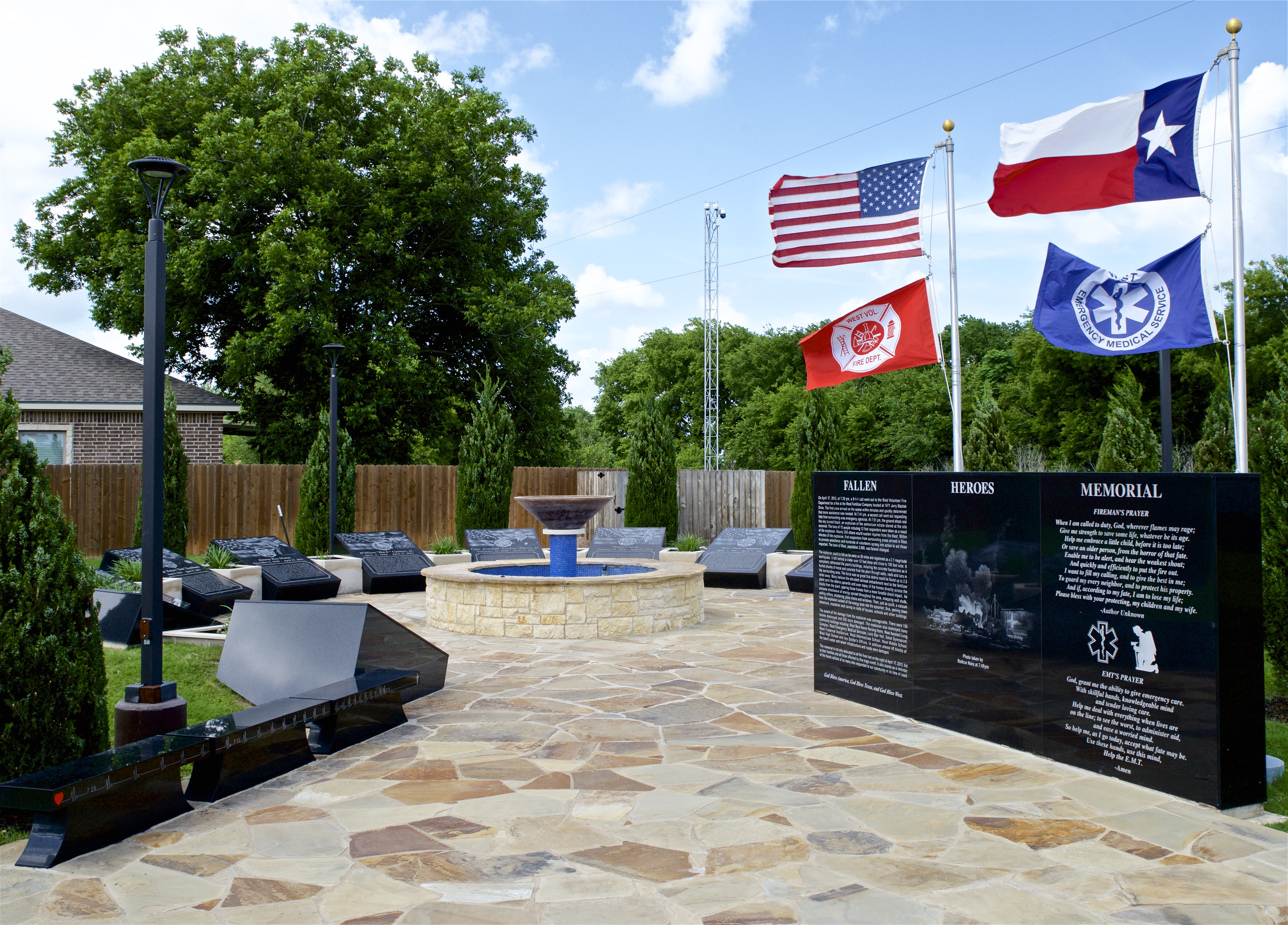
The Fallen Heroes Memorial in West, Texas

In 2019, the city of West dedicated the Fallen Heroes Memorial, a memorial park dedicated to the 15 people who died in the 2013 explosion. The memorial features a vertical stone wall with a narrative describing the event and its aftermath, and a circle of 15 stone markers (each stone marker dedicated to a victim) arranged in a circle around a reflecting pool and fountain.

The memorial was completed on land about 100 yards from where the fertilizer plant once stood, at a cost of approximately $300,000, most of which was covered by donations.

== See also ==
- Ammonium nitrate disasters
- PEPCON disaster
- Texas City disaster, 1947
- AZF explosion, 2001
- 2020 Beirut explosion
