= Ross, Texas =

- City
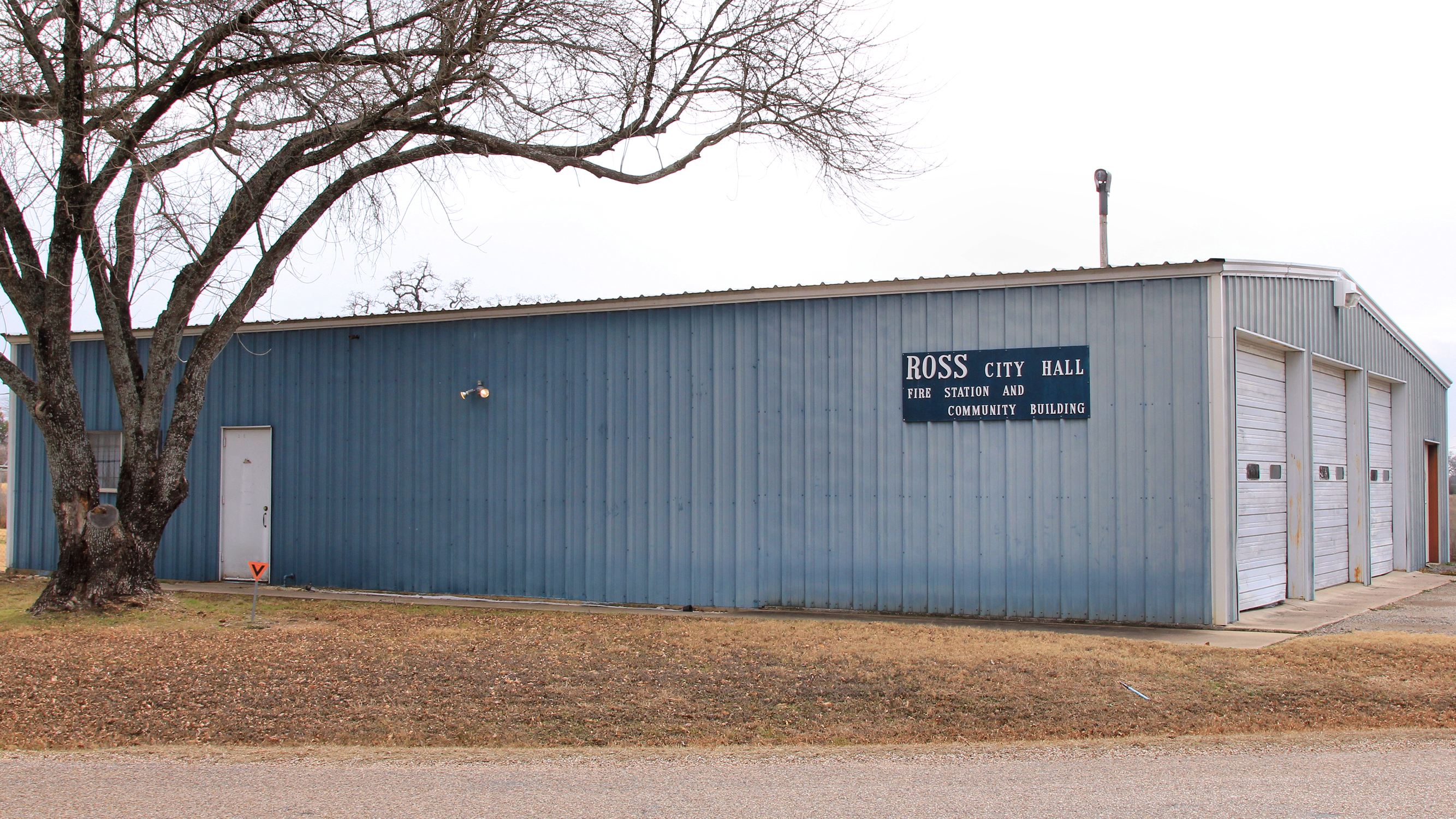
- Ross City Hall building

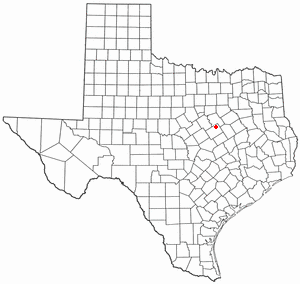
- Location of Ross, Texas

- Coordinates: 31°44′36″N 97°06′50″W
- Country: United States
- State: Texas
- County: McLennan

Area
  - Total: 1.75 sq mi (4.53 km^{2})
  - Land: 1.75 sq mi (4.53 km^{2})
  - Water: 0 sq mi (0.00 km^{2})
- Elevation: 571 ft (174 m)

Population (2020)
  - Total: 245
  - Density: 140/sq mi (54.1/km^{2})
- Time zone: UTC-6 (Central (CST))
  - Summer (DST): UTC-5 (CDT)
- ZIP code: 76684
- Area code: 254
- FIPS code: 48-63380
- GNIS feature ID: 2411002

Ross is a rural city in McLennan County, Texas, United States. The population was 245 at the 2020 census. It is part of the Waco Metropolitan Statistical Area.

== Geography ==
According to the United States Census Bureau, the city has a total area of 1.7 square miles (4.4 km^{2}), all land.

=== Climate ===
The climate in this area is characterized by hot, humid summers and generally mild to cool winters. According to the Köppen Climate Classification system, Ross has a humid subtropical climate, abbreviated "Cfa" on climate maps.

== Demographics ==
Historical population
| Census | Pop. | Note | %± |
|---|---|---|---|
| 1980 | 200 | | — |
| 1990 | 188 | | −6.0% |
| 2000 | 228 | | 21.3% |
| 2010 | 283 | | 24.1% |
| 2020 | 245 | | −13.4% |
U.S. Decennial Census; 2020 Census

=== 2020 census ===
As of the 2020 census, Ross had a population of 245. The median age was 43.1 years. 18.8% of residents were under the age of 18 and 19.2% of residents were 65 years of age or older. For every 100 females there were 97.6 males, and for every 100 females age 18 and over there were 107.3 males age 18 and over.

0.0% of residents lived in urban areas, while 100.0% lived in rural areas.

There were 89 households in Ross, of which 22.5% had children under the age of 18 living in them. Of all households, 66.3% were married-couple households, 16.9% were households with a male householder and no spouse or partner present, and 15.7% were households with a female householder and no spouse or partner present. About 17.9% of all households were made up of individuals and 4.5% had someone living alone who was 65 years of age or older.

There were 99 housing units, of which 10.1% were vacant. The homeowner vacancy rate was 0.0% and the rental vacancy rate was 6.3%.

Racial composition as of the 2020 census
| Race | Number | Percent |
|---|---|---|
| White | 198 | 80.8% |
| Black or African American | 1 | 0.4% |
| American Indian and Alaska Native | 3 | 1.2% |
| Asian | 0 | 0.0% |
| Native Hawaiian and Other Pacific Islander | 0 | 0.0% |
| Some other race | 24 | 9.8% |
| Two or more races | 19 | 7.8% |
| Hispanic or Latino (of any race) | 36 | 14.7% |

=== 2000 census ===
As of the 2000 census, there were 228 people, 85 households, and 66 families residing in the city. The population density was 130.8 inhabitants per square mile (50.5/km^{2}). There were 93 housing units at an average density of 53.3 per square mile (20.6/km^{2}). The racial makeup of the city was 96.93% White, 2.19% African American, and 0.88% from two or more races. Hispanic or Latino of any race were 5.26% of the population.

There were 85 households, out of which 34.1% had children under the age of 18 living with them, 67.1% were married couples living together, 8.2% had a female householder with no husband present, and 21.2% were non-families. 20.0% of all households were made up of individuals, and 10.6% had someone living alone who was 65 years of age or older. The average household size was 2.68 and the average family size was 3.09.

In the city, the population was spread out, with 27.6% under the age of 18, 6.6% from 18 to 24, 28.1% from 25 to 44, 22.8% from 45 to 64, and 14.9% who were 65 years of age or older. The median age was 38 years. For every 100 females, there were 103.6 males. For every 100 females age 18 and over, there were 101.2 males.

The median income for a household in the city was $31,250, and the median income for a family was $41,875. Males had a median income of $37,031 versus $21,250 for females. The per capita income for the city was $17,569. About 4.5% of families and 2.8% of the population were below the poverty line, including none of those under the age of eighteen and 10.0% of those 65 or over.

== Education ==
The City of Ross is served by the West Independent School District.
