= Vanessa Allen Sutherland =

American lawyer

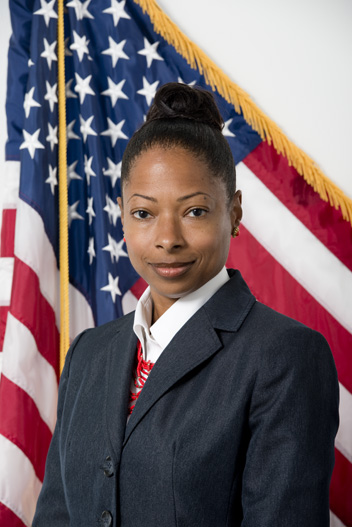

Chairman of the U.S. Chemical Safety and Hazard Investigation Board
- In office August 2015 – June 2018
- President: Barack Obama (2015–2017); Donald Trump (2017–2018)
- Preceded by: Rafael Moure-Eraso
- Succeeded by: Kristen Kulinowski (acting); Katherine Lemos

Personal details
- Born: Sibley Memorial Hospital, Washington, D.C., United States
- Parent(s): Audrey Allen (mother); Herbert Allen (father)
- Education: Drew University (B.A., 1992); American University (J.D., 1996; M.B.A, 1997)

Vanessa Lorraine Allen Sutherland is a corporate lawyer and former chairperson of the U.S. Chemical Safety and Hazard Investigation Board (CSB).

== Early life ==
Sutherland was born at Sibley Memorial Hospital in Washington, D.C. She lived in Tantallon, Maryland, where she attended Queen Anne School. She graduated from high school at the age of 16 and enrolled at Drew University, where she received a B.A. in political science and art history, and later attended American University, where she received a J.D. and M.B.A. After graduating from college, she moved to Fort Washington, Maryland.

== Career ==
After graduating from Drew, Sutherland worked at the office of the Inspector General of the Department of Energy prior to attending law school. While attending American University, she served as an associate at Federal Deposit Insurance Corporation and a clerk at Fulbright & Jaworski.

After graduating from law school, she worked as a corporate attorney at the telecommunications company MCI Inc. At this company, she became vice president and deputy general counsel of Digex, a subsidiary. She later worked as a counsel for the tobacco product producer Altria (formerly Philip Morris Companies, Inc.).

In 2011, Sutherland began government service as chief counsel for the Pipeline and Hazardous Materials Safety Administration.

== Chemical Safety Board ==
Sutherland was nominated by President Barack Obama to the U.S. Chemical Safety Board in March 2015 after the resignation of Rafael Moure-Eraso over allegations of mismanagement. She was confirmed by the Senate in August 2015.

In 2017, Sutherland was chairperson of the agency when the Trump administration attempted to defund the CSB for the 2018 United States federal budget. In March 2018, the Office of Management and Budget informed Sutherland that the Trump administration had again proposed to shut down the agency as part of the 2019 United States federal budget. This caused Sutherland to resign despite having two years left in her five-year term. After leaving the CSB, Sutherland joined Norfolk Southern Railway as a vice president.

The agency was ultimately not defunded after the House Appropriations Committee opposed the Trump administration's proposal and proposed a $1 million increase in the agency's 2019 budget. Kristen Kulinowski became the interim executive after Sutherland's departure until Katherine Lemos was confirmed as chair in March 2020.

CSB says it closed thirteen incident investigations under Sutherland.
