= Extension agency =

An extension agency is an organisation that practices extension, in the context of community development; it is any "organization in some countries that uses scientific research and new information to improve farming methods and develop country communities by educating farmers and local people".

An example is the Cooperative Extension Service, which aims to assist individuals or groups in defining and achieving their goals in rural communities in the United States.

Extension agents are trained in the skills of extension, such as communication and group facilitation, and usually in technical areas of the sector they serve (for example agriculture, health, or safety). Agricultural extension agencies promote more profitable and sustainable farming, while health extension agencies promote improved health.

Extension agents are represented by professional organisations such as the Australasia-Pacific Extension Network and publish in journals such as the Journal of Extension.
