= Rafael Moure-Eraso =

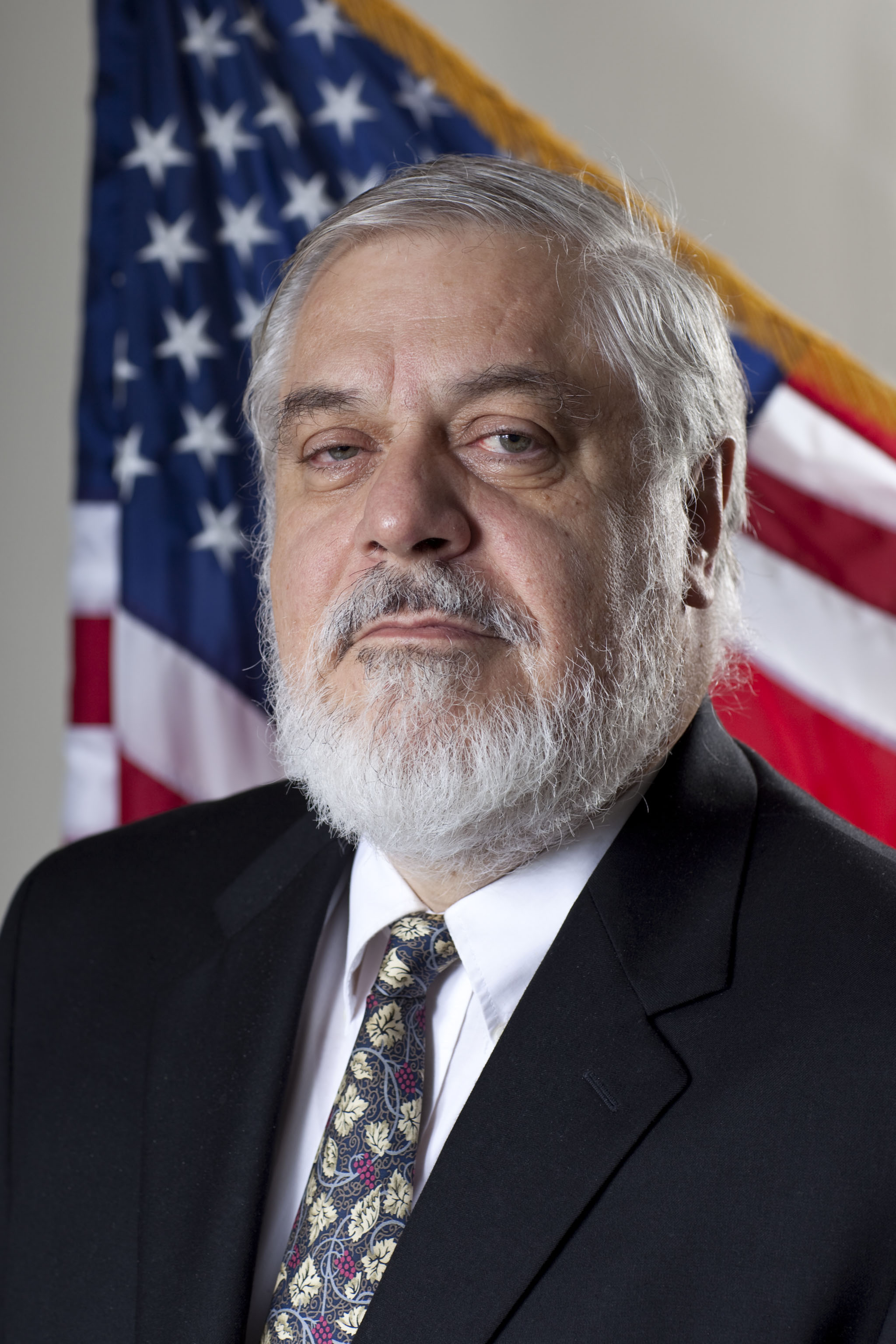

Chairman of the U.S. Chemical Safety and Hazard Investigation Board
- In office June 23, 2010 – March 26, 2015
- President: Barack Obama
- Preceded by: John S. Bresland
- Succeeded by: Vanessa Allen Sutherland

Personal details
- Born: Rafael Moure-Eraso; May 2, 1946 (age 80) Cali, Colombia
- Citizenship: United States (since 1985)
- Spouse: Laura Punnett
- Education: University of Pittsburgh; Bucknell University; University of Cincinnati

Rafael Moure-Eraso (born May 2, 1946) is a Colombian-born American chemical engineer. He is a former chairman and chief executive of the U.S. Chemical Safety and Hazard Investigation Board (CSB).

== Early life ==
Moure-Eraso was born in Cali, Colombia, in 1946. He grew up in Bogotá where he was educated by Augustinian friars and at the University of Los Andes.

== Education ==
He received his B.Sc. in chemical engineering from the University of Pittsburgh in 1967 and M.Sc. in chemical engineering from Bucknell University in 1970. He received his M.Sc. and Ph.D. from the University of Cincinnati in Environmental Health-Industrial Hygiene in 1974 and 1982.

== Career ==
For over 30 years, Moure-Eraso has been involved in workplace safety issues. Prior to joining the CSB Moure-Eraso served as a member of the National Advisory Committee on Occupational Health (NACOSH) for the Occupational Safety and Health Administration (OSHA) and as a member of the Scientific Advisory Committee of the National Institute for Occupational Safety and Health (NIOSH). Moure-Eraso has also worked as a chemical engineer for Rohm and Haas and the Dow Chemical Company. He was a faculty member at the University of Massachusetts Lowell for 22 years and chairman of the university's Department of Work Environment for 5 years. He has also served as an industrial hygienist engineer with the national offices of the United Automobile Workers union and the Oil, Chemical and Atomic Workers International Union.

== Chemical Safety Board ==
Moure-Eraso was nominated by President Barack Obama to the U.S. Chemical Safety Board in March 2010 and confirmed by the Senate in June 2010.

In March 2015, he was called to testify in front of the House Oversight Committee regarding the management of the Chemical Safety Board. Following that testimony fourteen members of the committee issued a letter to the White House calling on the president to use his statutory authority to remove Moure-Eraso from his position as chairman of the CSB. The letter cited a pattern of retaliation against whistleblowers, disenfranchisement of fellow board members, low morale in the organization, and possible violations of the Federal Records Act by using personal email accounts for official business.

Moure-Eraso told the Los Angeles Times: "A lot of it is political. The mission of the organization is to produce good reports that make a difference for safety. We are doing that. I can show that we are producing the best reports ever produced in the agency. I stand by that. All of this other talk is peripheral... There have been a lot of accusations, but none of those have ever ended in any findings. The Office of Special Counsel has made no recommendations. Anybody can claim actions against whistleblowers, but there’s no evidence of this. To just say it is not enough. What I would like to be judged for is the quality of the product and the fulfillment of our mission. There will always be people complaining. But they are all rumors." He resigned his post on March 26, 2015.
