= Texas A&M University College of Engineering =

Texas college

Coordinates: 30.6210°N 96.3389°W

College of Engineering
- Former name: Dwight Look College of Engineering
- Type: Public
- Established: 1880; 146 years ago
- Parent institution: Texas A&M University
- Dean: Robert H. Bishop
- Faculty: 837 (Fall 2025)
- Students: 23,416 (Fall 2024)
- Undergraduates: 19,005 (Fall 2024)
- Postgraduates: 4,411 (Fall 2024)
- Website: College of Engineering

The Texas A&M College of Engineering is the engineering college of Texas A&M University in College Station. It is one of the oldest Colleges in A&M's history (dating back to the early days of the institution), and historically it has been one of its largest, with an annual enrollment of around 24,000 total students.

== History ==
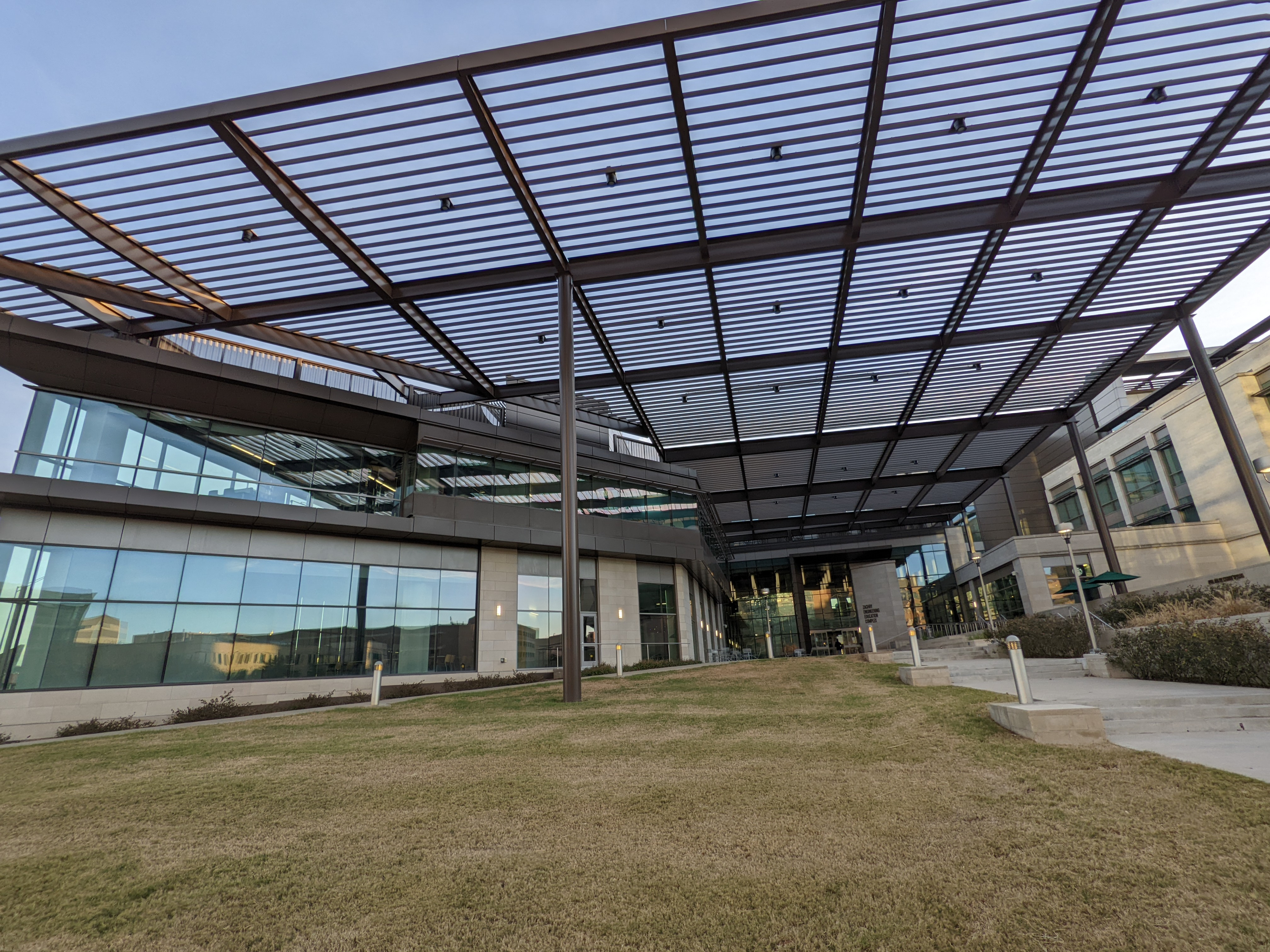
Zachry Engineering Education Complex, the main building for undergraduate engineering education

The first engineering department at Texas A&M appeared in 1880, four years after the foundation of the school, with the creation of the Department of Engineering, Mechanics, and Drawing. For the next several years, the curriculum focused on practical training to assist students in finding industrial and vocational work. By 1887, separate departments had been created for mechanical engineering and for civil engineering and drawing.

To assist the United States during World War I, the Department of Mechanical Engineering shifted focus to train blacksmiths, automobile mechanics, machinists, draftsmen, general mechanics, and pipe fitters for the war. Following the war, the department's enrollment continued to increase, and it began offering courses in power, industrial and railway, or transportation engineering. In the 1930s, these options were eliminated, while others, including aerodynamics, air-conditioning and physical metallurgy began to be offered. During the 1936–1937 school year, the Department of Mechanical Engineering was first accredited by the Engineering Council for Professional Development, now known as the Accreditation Board for Engineering and Technology.

By 1940, the engineering school comprised almost half of Texas A&M's enrollment. As World War II dawned, the school again assisted the war effort, with the Department of Mechanical Engineering faculty volunteering to teach at military bases throughout the state. Following the war, college introduced a Ph.D. program, and industries and government began to sponsor research within the College.

From 1992-2016, the College was known as the Dwight Look College of Engineering, named after Harold Dwight Look, a graduate and army veteran of World War II who later founded a construction company on the U.S. Territory of Guam, where he lived for 40 years until his death on September 5, 2002, at the age of 80. In 1992, Look donated 1,146 acres in Guam valued at $52 million to the university, considered at the time the largest single gift ever received by the university. It was reported that Texas A&M was looking to sell the property in 2009, which ultimately took place in 2016 (due to a severe crash in Asian real estate prices, the land sold for only $6 million). Upon sale of the land, in accordance with the original terms of the gift, Look's name was removed from the College's name (his name still remains on one of the four major buildings constituting the Engineering Quad at A&M).

== Academics ==
=== Academic Departments ===
The College of Engineering operates under 14 departments (names in parentheses are Departments which have naming rights attached):

- Aerospace Engineering
- Biological and Agricultural Engineering
- Biomedical Engineering
- Chemical Engineering (Artie McFerrin)
- Civil and Environmental Engineering (Zachry)
- Computer Science and Engineering
- Electrical and Computer Engineering
- Engineering Technology and Industrial Distribution
- Industrial and Systems Engineering (Wm. Michael Barnes, Class of 1964)
- Materials Science and Engineering
- Mechanical Engineering (J. Mike Walker, Class of 1966)
- Nuclear Engineering
- Ocean Engineering
- Petroleum Engineering (Harold Vance)

=== Degrees offered ===
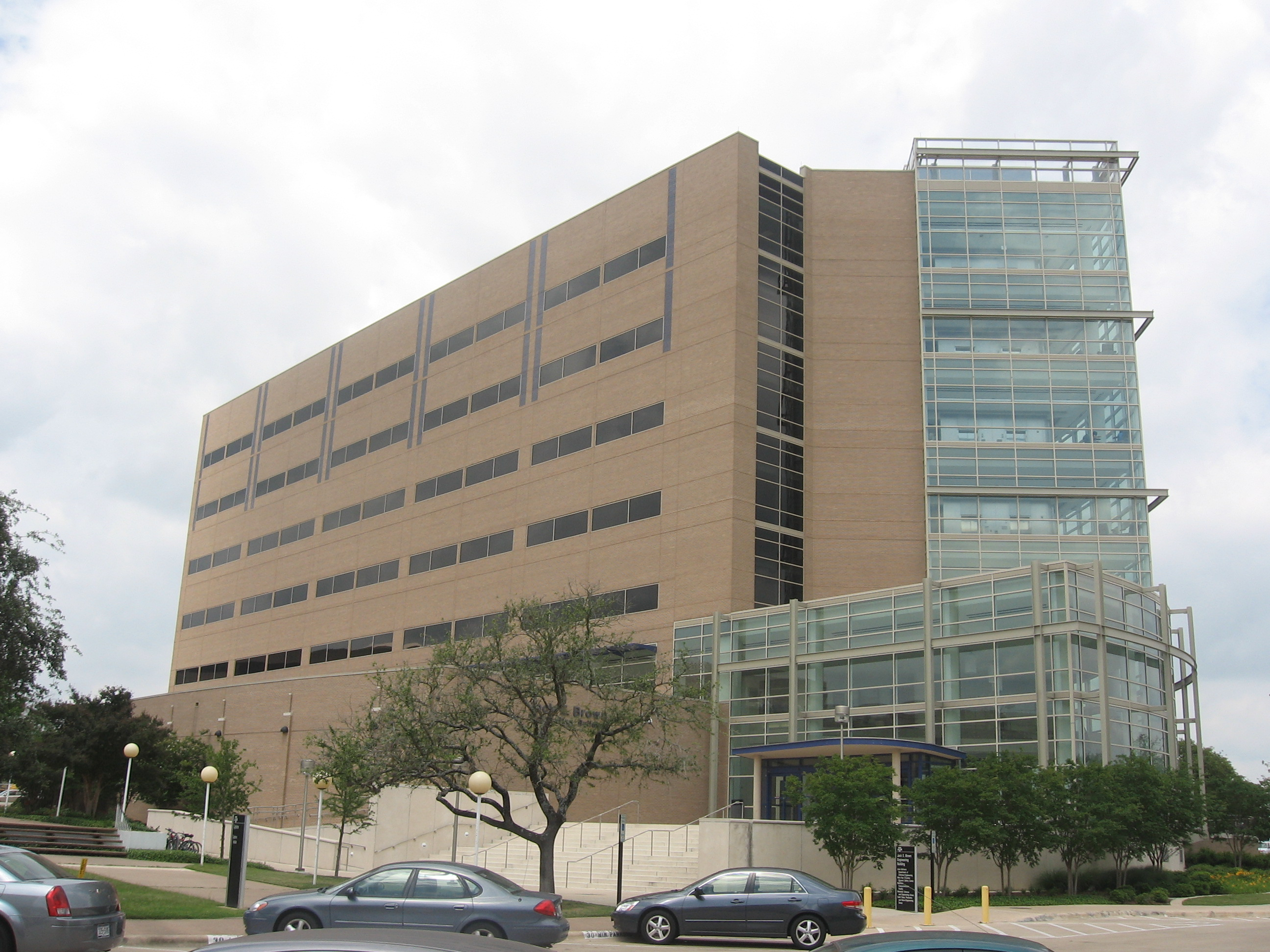
Jack E. Brown Engineering Building

As of the 2026-2027 academic year, these are the degrees (including minors and dual degrees) offered by the College (listed by the Department which offers them along with Interdisciplinary Engineering degrees offered):

- Aerospace Engineering – BS, MS, MEng, PhD
- Biological and Agricultural Engineering – BS (Biological and Agricultural Engineering, Agricultural Systems Management), MS (Biological and Agricultural Engineering, Agricultural Systems Management), MEng, PhD
- Biomedical Engineering – Minor, BS, MS, MEng, MEng/MBA dual degree, PhD
- Chemical Engineering – BS, MS (Chemical, Safety), MEng, PhD
- Civil Engineering – BS (Architectural, Civil, Environmental), MS, MEng, PhD
- Computer Science and Engineering – Minor (Computer Science, Game Design and Development), BA (Computer Science) BS (Computer Science, Computer Engineering), Master of Computer Science, MS (Computer Science, Computer Engineering), MEng (Computer Engineering), PhD (Computer Science, Computer Engineering)
- Electrical and Computer Engineering – Minor (Electrical Engineering) BS (Computer Engineering, Electrical Engineering), MS (Computer Engineering, Microelectronics and Semiconductors, Electrical Engineering), PhD (Computer Engineering, Electrical Engineering)
- Engineering Technology and Industrial Distribution – Minor (Embedded Systems Integration, Technical Sales), BA (Information Technology Service Management), BS (Electronic Systems Engineering Technology, Industrial Distribution, Manufacturing and Mechanical Engineering Technology, Multidisciplinary Engineering Technology), Master of Industrial Distribution, MS (Engineering Technology), MEng (Technical Management)
- Industrial and Systems Engineering – Minor (Industrial Engineering), BS (Industrial Engineering, Data Engineering), BS Industrial Engineering/Master of Public Health accelerated degree, BS/MS Finance accelerated degree, MS (Industrial Engineering, Engineering Management), MEng (Industrial Engineering), PhD (Industrial Engineering)
- Interdisciplinary Engineering – Minor (Engineering Project Management, Engineering Entrepreneurship), BS, BS/Master of Public Health combined degree, MS, MEng/MD combined degree, DEng, PhD
- Materials Science and Engineering – Minor, BS, MS, MEng, PhD
- Mechanical Engineering – BS, MS, MEng, PhD
- Nuclear Engineering – Minor (Nuclear, Radiological Health), BS, MS, MEng, PhD
- Ocean Engineering – BS, MS, MEng (Ocean, Subsea), PhD
- Petroleum Engineering – BS, MS, MEng, PhD

In addition, several departments offer specialized certificates, which count towards academic credit but not necessarily a degree or minor.

=== Rankings ===
The 2026 edition of the U.S. News & World Report ranks the Texas A&M University College of Engineering graduate program 9th and the undergraduate program 10th.

Individual engineering programs as ranked among public institutions by U.S. News & World Report:

- Aerospace: 6th graduate, 8th undergraduate
- Biological and Agricultural: 6th graduate, 1st undergraduate
- Biomedical: 18th graduate
- Chemical: 14th graduate, 12th undergraduate
- Computer Engineering: 11th graduate, 12th undergraduate
- Computer Science: 20th graduate, 16th undergraduate
- Civil Engineering: 9th graduate, 7th undergraduate
- Electrical: 13th graduate, 11th undergraduate
- Industrial and Systems Engineering: 5th graduate, 7th undergraduate
- Materials Science: 8th graduate, 12th undergraduate
- Mechanical: 6th graduate, 7th undergraduate
- Nuclear: 7th graduate, 2nd undergraduate (2019)
- Petroleum: 2nd graduate, 1st undergraduate

=== Research ===
According to the National Science Foundation's Higher Education Research and Development Survey, as of 2025, the college had $464.8 million in engineering research expenditures, ranking it 3rd overall.

The College maintains responsibility for three independent agencies as part of the overall Texas A&M University System:

- Texas A&M Engineering Experiment Station (TEES)
- Texas A&M Engineering Extension Service (TEEX)
- Texas A&M Transportation Institute (TTI)
