= Texas A&M Engineering Extension Service =

Government agency in Texas, USA

- Official TEEX logo

Agency overview
- Formed: 1919 and 1940 (predecessor agencies); 1948 (current merged agency)
- Type: extension agency
- Jurisdiction: State of Texas
- Headquarters: College Station, Texas
- Annual budget: $76.4 million (FY2013)
- Agency executives: David Coatney, Director; Alphonse Davis, Deputy Director
- Website: www.teex.org

Texas A&M Engineering Extension Service (TEEX, pronounced "teeks") is a state extension agency that offers training programs and technical assistance to public safety workers, both in Texas and around the world. Established in 1940 as the Industrial Extension Service, the agency took on its current name when it joined The Texas A&M University System in 1948. The agency sponsors the state's primary urban search and rescue force, Urban Search and Rescue Texas Task Force 1, and operates the Brayton Fire Training Field. Brayton is the largest firefighting training facility in the United States, and also contains a mock city for conducting training operations for emergency responders.

== History ==
The first step toward the formation of the Texas A&M Engineering Extension Service was the passing of the Morrill Land-Grant College Act in 1862, which led to the founding of several land-grant colleges, including the Agricultural and Mechanical College of Texas in 1871, which later became known as Texas A&M University. Despite its name, the college taught no agricultural classes, leading to protests by farmer groups and to much of the college's leadership being replaced. Other land-grant colleges around the country were also struggling, as farmers felt they had little incentive to adopt intensive farming methods and other advanced agricultural technologies. In response to the growing criticisms and lack of agricultural research being conducted, Congress passed the Hatch Experiment Station Act of 1887, which provided funding for agricultural experiment stations in each state. This led to the founding of the Texas Agricultural Experiment Station in 1887, tasked with conducting research in all aspects of crop and livestock operations. While considered a big step toward improving farming, the stations struggled to effectively communicate their findings to farmers. In 1903, Seaman Asahel Knapp (1831–1911), a US Department of Agriculture agent, created a demonstration farm, where he could show other farmers how new farming techniques and production methods could benefit them. His success got Congress' notice and led to the passing of the Smith-Lever Act on May 8, 1914, which gave states the ability to establish official extension agencies affiliated with their land-grant universities. The Act helped to "extend" the research findings of the colleges and Experiment Stations in practical ways that helped the citizens in every county. Texas quickly took advantage of this new act and formed the Texas Agricultural Extension Service in the same year, associating it with the Agricultural & Mechanical College of Texas (Texas AMC).

Three years later, Congress passed the Smith-Hughes Act for establishing public vocational technical training. Texas AMC began offering a limited industrial teacher training service. In 1919, the school began offering the Trade and Industrial Teacher Training Service. Supervised by the school's Agricultural Education department, the program was designed to train industry professionals to teach trade and industrial courses at Texas public schools. The School of Vocational Training took over the program in 1924, with the offerings split into three departments: Rural Education, Agricultural Education, and Industrial Education. The Industrial Education department offered training conferences for oil field foremen, covering topics related to job planning and work supervision. The legislature and the State Firemen's and Fire Marshals' Association established a firefighter training school at the school in 1929. With the closing of the Vocational Training school in 1935, the Industrial Education department moved to the Engineering school.

The Industrial Extension Service was founded in August 1940 and began offering training programs to water and sewage plant operators, custodial workers, police officers, firefighters, emergency medical technicians, and automobile mechanics. The firefighter school was merged into the agency in 1947. In July 1948, Texas A.& M. College formed The Texas A&M University System, incorporating seven related agencies, including the Industrial Extension Service which was renamed to the Texas Engineering Extension Service. The agency was charged with "providing occupational and technical training services on an extension basis to the citizens of Texas".

== Organization model ==
Texas A&M Engineering Extension Service operates as part of The Texas A&M University System and is overseen by the university's board of regents. The agency is composed of six divisions: Emergency Services Training Institute (ESTI), Infrastructure Training & Safety Institute (ITSI), National Emergency Response & Rescue Training Center (NERRTC), OSHA Training Institute Southwest Education Center, Law Enforcement & Security Training (LAW), and Knowledge Engineering (KE). It maintains an office in Galveston, and has training facilities in Abilene, Arlington, Corpus Christi, Houston, and San Antonio.

In 1993, the agency had an annual operating budget of $38 million and conducted some 5,700 training classes attended by 120,000 students. By 2013, its budget had grown to $76.4 million, and had reached some 183,750 students through over 2.84 million contact hours. The agency's current director is Gary F. Sera, who became the director in December 2007 after serving as the agency's interim director for nine months. Serving under the director are the deputy director, two associate agency directors, and six division heads.

== Brayton Fire Training Field ==
Brayton Fire Training Field is a 297-acre (1.20 km^{2}; 0.464 sq mi) live-fueled firefighter training facility located adjacent to Easterwood Airport. The largest in the United States, the facility has 132 training stations and 22 fueled live-fire props, including full-scale buildings, tanks, and a ship, that enable trainees to experience lifelike simulations. More than 4,000 firefighters and emergency workers visit the facility in the summer for its annual Texas Fire Training Schools.

Adjacent to Brayton's southern border is "Disaster City®", a 52-acre (0.21 km^{2}; 0.081 sq mi) mock city that serves as a training facility for emergency responders. Costing $7.7 million to construct, the city was built in 1998 in direct response to the Oklahoma City Bombing which then director G. Kemble Bennett felt highlighted the need for "a world-class facility to train responders in near-lifelike conditions." The city acts as the main training location for Texas A&M Task Force 1, and features collapsible structures that are designed to simulate various kinds of disasters and wreckage. It also provides complex interactive disaster scenarios for state and federal urban search and rescue teams, U.S. military CERFP and WMD-Civil Support Team teams, Department of Health and Human Services Disaster Medical Assistance Team (DMAT) and NVRT teams, and other specialized international search and rescue teams.
