= Urban Search and Rescue Texas Task Force 1 =

FEMA Urban Search and Rescue Task Force based in College Station, Texas

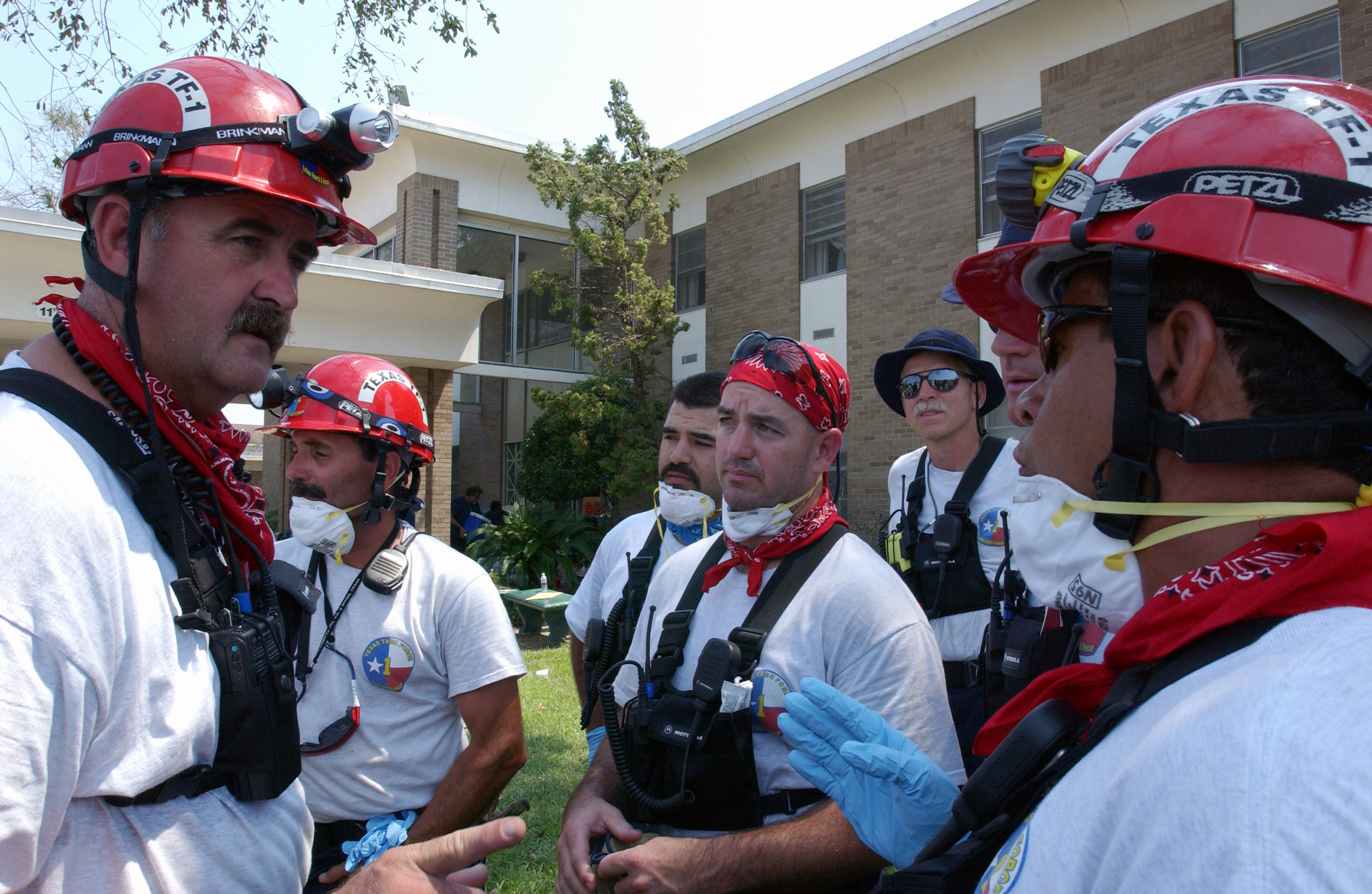
Members of TX-TF1 discuss search operations after Hurricane Katrina.

Texas A&M Task Force 1, abbreviated TX-TF1, is a FEMA Urban Search and Rescue Task Force, one of 28 teams that form the FEMA National Urban Search and Rescue System, and as such it is in rotation for deploying to national disasters and incidents of national significance. It is sponsored by the Texas A&M Engineering Extension Service and headquartered in College Station, Texas.

== History ==
Texas Task Force 1 was organized in 1997, and officially joined the FEMA National US&R System as a full, non-probationary member in June 2001. Starting in 2005, TX-TF1 expanded their search and rescue capability to include water rescue, with the purchase of additional equipment, boats, and a logistical support trailer. In 2009, the Helicopter Search and Rescue Technician (HSART) program was officially created within TX-TF1. This new program allowed for a quick response time of trained inland helicopter based search and rescue, along with partner agencies Texas Military Forces and the Texas Department of Public Safety. The TX-TF1 HSART program gives the state of Texas the ability to deploy trained personnel, aircrews, airframes during large state-wide disasters.

At the November 15th Texas A&M University System (TAMUS) Board of Regents Meeting, TAMUS Chancellor John Sharp submitted a resolution to the TAMUS Board of Regents for their approval and adoption, which was approved, changing Texas Task Force 1's name to Texas A&M Task Force 1, effective December 1, 2018.

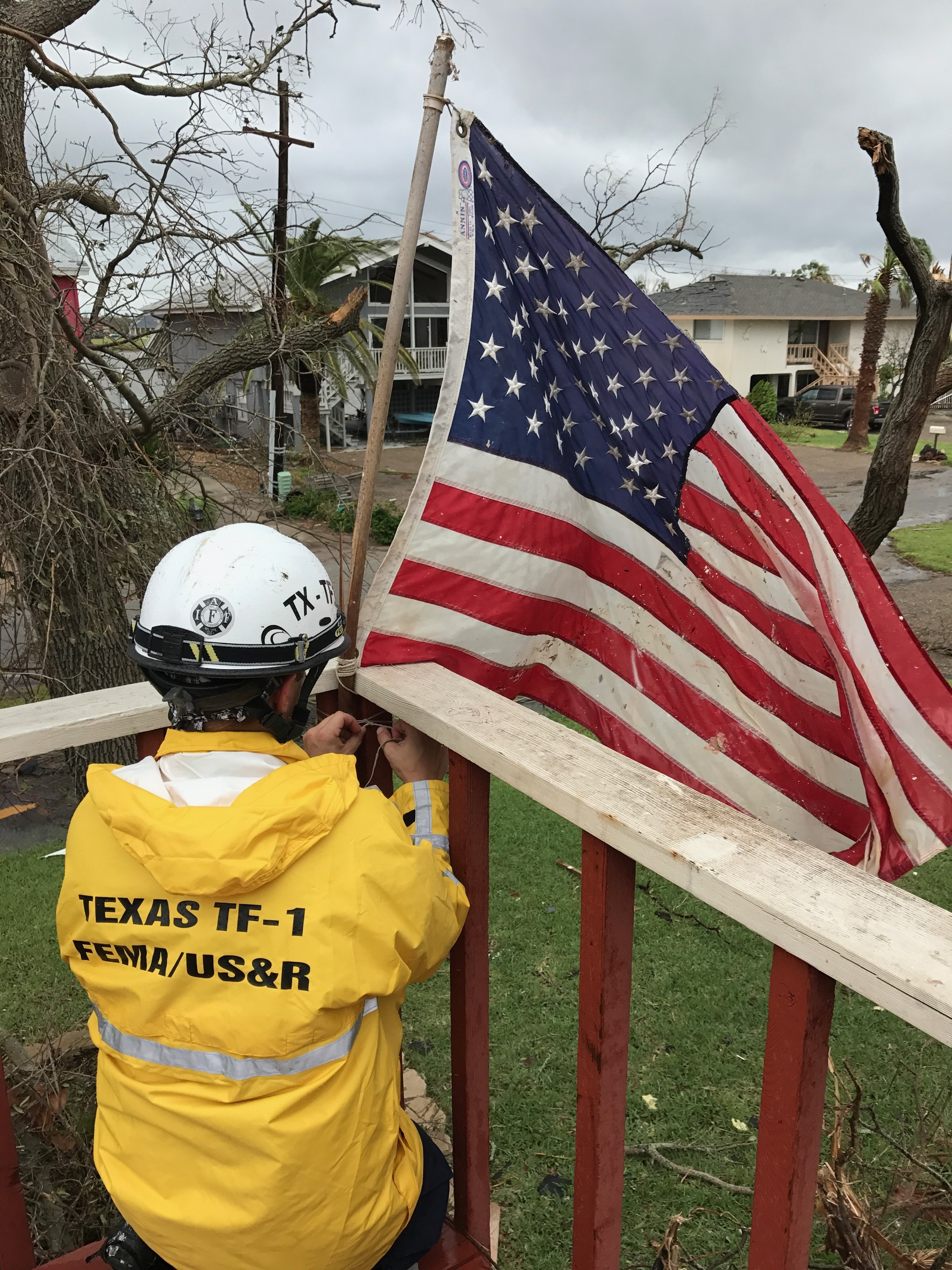
A member of Texas Task Force 1 re-hoists a fallen US flag in Rockport, Texas, following landfall of Hurricane Harvey in 2017.

== Deployments ==
Texas A&M Task Force 1 personnel have responded to incidents such as 9/11 and Hurricane Katrina. Texas Task Force 1 was dispatched to the April 17, 2013 West fertilizer plant explosion and were dispatched to assist in the wake of the 2013 Moore tornado. In 2014 they were dispatched to an area outside of Little Rock, Arkansas to assist after a number of tornadoes hit the area. TX-TF1 had a record number of deployments in 2015, 2016, 2017, and 2018 as the team responded such natural disasters as the catastrophic 2015 Blanco River floods, the damaging May 2016 North American storm complex, the historic 2017 Atlantic hurricane season, to include Hurricane Harvey and Hurricane Maria, and the very busy 2018 Atlantic hurricane season responding to Hurricane Florence and Hurricane Michael.

== Composition ==
Texas A&M Task Force One has the capability to deploy as a Type-1, Type-2, Type-3, or Type-4 Urban Search and Rescue (USAR) task force, as well as a water rescue resources, and helicopter based rescue resources.

It is made up of responders from over 60 jurisdictions across Texas and has over 650 active members, all of whom must reside within a three-hour radius of College Station. Firefighters, paramedics, doctors, nurses, structural engineers, and canine handlers are among those making up the Task Force teams. Each month, one team is on stand-up, one team is on stand-by, and one team is on stand-down; the stand-up team must be ready 24 hours a day to be mobilized and deployed within four hours.

Texas A&M Task Force 1 members are trained as specialists as well as cross-trained in other jobs on the task force. Members are required to complete over 90 hours of training per year, attend regional training, position specific training, and attend an annual full-scale exercise in Disaster City. Texas Task Force 1 members bring a variety of full-time job skills to the task force. Designed to be logistically self-sufficient for the first 72 hours of operation, the task force is able to function for up to 14 days under remote and austere conditions.

Texas A&M Task Force 1 maintains a $7 million equipment cache of more than 70,000 items weighing in excess of 100,000 pounds.

== See also ==
- Texas Task Force 2 Urban Search & Rescue
