= Texas A&M Engineering Experiment Station =

Engineering research agency

- Formed: August 25, 1914
- Headquarters: Bryan, Texas
- Academic partners: 22
- Specialized research centers: 22

The Texas A&M Engineering Experiment Station (TEES, pronounced "tease") is an engineering research agency within The Texas A&M University System and is governed by the Board of Regents.

Headquartered at the RELLIS Campus in Bryan, TEES has a close relationship with Texas A&M University and all other System members, as well as partnerships with other community colleges and universities.

== Leadership ==
=== Directors and Associate Directors ===
- Dr. Robert H. Bishop, Director
- Dr. Rodney Bowersox, Deputy Director
- Robert Ambrose, Associate Agency Director, Project Office Director for Space
- Gerard L. Coté, Associate Agency Director, Project Office Director for Health and Human Performance, also for Industry Engagement and Entrepreneurism
- Arum Han, Associate Agency Director, Project Office Director for CHIPS
- Dr. Arul Jayaraman, Associate Agency Director
- Dr. Cindy Lawley, Associate Agency Director, Workforce Development and Regional Divisions
- Ivett Levya, Associate Dean for Research, Texas A&M-Fort Worth
- Dr. Jodie Lutkenhaus, Associate Agency Director
- Dr. Lin Shao, Associate Agency Director

=== Executive Leadership ===
- Casey Bryan, Chief Information Officer
- Kerry Kinirons, Assistant Vice Chancellor for Federal Relations
- Rebecca Marianno, Executive Director, Engineering Research Office
- Barbara Mendoza, Assistant Vice Chancellor, Marketing & Communications
- Nicole Pottberg, Assistant Chief Operating Officer
- Melissa Thallemer, Chief People Officer
- Lona Warren, Assistant Vice Chancellor, Chief of Staff
- Jeffrey Williford, Assistant Vice Chancellor, State Relations
- Jane Zhou, Assistant Vice Chancellor, Chief Financial Officer

== Regional Educational Partners ==
- Angelo State University
- Del Mar College
- East Texas A&M University
- Lamar University
- New Mexico State University (regional affiliate)
- Prairie View A&M University
- Sam Houston State University
- Tarleton State University
- Tarrant County College
- Texas A&M International University
- Texas A&M University
- Texas A&M University at Galveston
- Texas A&M University-Central Texas
- Texas A&M University-Corpus Christi
- Texas A&M University-Kingsville
- Texas A&M University-San Antonio
- Texas A&M University-Texarkana
- Texas A&M University-Victoria
- Texas State University (regional affiliate)
- Texas Woman's University
- University of North Texas (regional affiliate)
- West Texas A&M University
