= Texas A&M AgriLife Extension Service =

Agency in Texas, USA

Agency overview
- Formed: 1915
- Jurisdiction: Texas
- Headquarters: College Station, Texas
- Employees: 1351 full-time, 527 part-time
- Annual budget: $113 million (FY 2013, excludes $35 million in local operating funds from county commissioners' courts)
- Agency executives: Dr. Rick Avery, Director; Dr. Angela Burkham, Associate Director - State Operations; Dr. Jeff Ripley, Associate Director - County Programs
- Parent agency: Texas A&M AgriLife
- Website: http://agrilifeextension.tamu.edu/

Texas A&M AgriLife Extension Service was formally established in 1915 after the 1914 passing of the Smith-Lever Act and in conjunction with Texas A&M University. Originally named Texas Agricultural Extension Service, then later Texas Cooperative Extension, the name Texas AgriLife Extension Service was adopted on January 1, 2008. A&M was added to the agency name on September 1, 2012 as a result of a Texas A&M University System change to strengthen the association with Texas A&M. The primary mission of AgriLife Extension is to provide educational outreach programs and services to the citizens of Texas. In conjunction with Texas A&M AgriLife Research, the Extension faculty members conduct research and bring practical applications of those research findings to the people of Texas.

== Programs ==
Texas A&M AgriLife Extension, in partnership with federal, state, and local governments, as well as others, serves the state of Texas through relevant, research-backed, community-based education. The mission of AgriLife Extension is to improve the lives of people, businesses and communities across Texas and beyond. The educational programs, activities, and resources of AgriLife Extension are generally organized under one of four broad program areas:

- Agriculture and Natural Resources
- Family and Consumer Sciences
- 4-H and Youth Development
- Community Economic Development

== History ==
The early history of Texas A&M AgriLife Extension Service is a blending of the history of the Cooperative extension service itself, Texas A&M University and Prairie View A&M University. The first step towards the creation of Cooperative Extension occurred in 1862 with the passing of the Morrill Land-Grant College Act. This law granted every state 30,000 acres (120 km^{2}) of public land for each of its House and Senate members, with the land being used to endow land-grant colleges for the teaching of agriculture and other practical arts. This led to the Texas Legislature founding the Agricultural and Mechanical College of Texas (referred to as Texas A.M.C. for short in 1871, which was funded through the Morill Act and was Texas' first public institution of higher education. In compliance with the Morrill Act, in 1876 the Fifteenth Texas Legislature endowed the Agricultural and Mechanical College for the Benefit of Colored Youth (the future Prairie View A&M University) as part of Texas A.M.C. In 1890, an amendment to the Morrill Act was passed to deal with the issue of providing steading funding to the land-grant colleges and to prohibit racial discrimination at any of the funded colleges.

During its early years, despite its name Texas A.M.C. didn't teach any agricultural classes at all, leading to protests by farmer groups and much of college's leadership being replaced. Despite the new curriculum in agriculture and engineering, the college's enrollment continued to drop. The land-grant colleges around the country were struggling. With the ample land available in the West, most farmers had little incentive to adopt intensive farming methods and other advanced agricultural technologies. As with Texas A.M.C., the agricultural colleges were being criticized for not actually giving their students the training that would enable them to return to their family farms, and instead the graduates were leaving the farm life altogether. For most observers, however, the biggest issue was that there was no solid agricultural research on which to base the practical teaching being attempted, so to fill this need Congress passed the Hatch Experiment Station Act of 1887, which provided funding for agricultural experiment stations in each state. This led to the founding of the Texas Agricultural Experiment Station in 1887 at Texas A.M.C. This new organization was given the task of conducting research in all aspects of crop and livestock operations.

The founding of the Experiment Stations was considered a big step towards improving farming, however the Experiment Station personnel soon realized that without a way to effectively communicate their findings to farmers, all their effort was for not. While they made attempts at out-reach, the results were limited and required diverting critical funds away from their core mission: research. In 1903, Seaman Asahel Knapp (1831-1911), a US Department of Agriculture agent, created two demonstration farms - the Walter C. Porter Demonstration Farm near Terrell, and the Greenville Demonstration Farm near Greenville - where he could show other farmers how new farming techniques and production methods could benefit them. In 1906, William C. Crider was appointed by Knapp as the first county agricultural agent in Texas (Smith County), and the first in the nation to serve a single county. Tom M. Marks organized the first Boys' Corn Club in Texas in Jack County, and this forerunner of Four-H Club activities became important. Girls' clubs, home demonstration, farmers' institutes, and the establishment of a Department of Extension at Texas A&M followed. The Texas legislature passed laws authorizing the county commissioners' court to provide and fund offices and conduct extension work in agriculture and home economics with Texas A&M. On January 16, 1912, in Milam County, Mrs. Edna W. Trigg became the first woman agent in the state. By 1913 demonstrations, shows, and fairs were common throughout Texas.

As word of the work of Knapp and the others spread, Congress took notice. Impressed by the success, Congress passed the Smith-Lever Act on May 8, 1914, which gave states the ability to establish official extension agencies affiliated with their land-grant universities to help "extend" the research findings of the colleges and Experiment Stations in practical ways that helped the citizens in every county. Texas quickly took advantage of this new act, forming the Texas Agricultural Extension Service in June of the same year and associating it with Texas A.M.C. The Texas legislature formally accepted the provisions of the Smith-Lever Act on January 29, 1915.

In 1948, Texas A&M formed the Texas A&M University System, incorporating the Extension agency and six related agencies which are still part of the system today. In 2001, Texas Agricultural Extension Service changed its name to Texas Cooperative Extension, feeling the new name would better reflect its mission and its focus on serving all Texans. In 2007, Dr. Elsa Murano, who was overseeing Texas A&M Agriculture as a whole, implemented another name change. After paying for a consultation from an outside firm, she also undertook to change the name of Texas A&M Agriculture, and Texas Agricultural Experiment Station. On January 1, 2008, Extension's name officially changed to Texas AgriLife Extension Service. The agency felt that "AgriLife" better reflected the agency's foundational message that "agriculture is life."

On September 1, 2012, following the recommendation of Texas A&M University System Chancellor John Sharp, the agencies of the Texas A&M University System formally added "A&M" into their names. Texas AgriLife Extension Service became Texas A&M AgriLife Extension Service on this date. The purpose of this effort was to create a unified branding which better associates the A&M System entities with Texas A&M University.

== Organizational model ==
Texas A&M AgriLife Extension is the largest extension service in the US and a leading employer in the Brazos County. Headquartered at the Texas A&M University campus in College Station, AgriLife Extension develops much of its own curriculum, which it then teaches across the state through its network of over 600 county extension agents located in 250 of the 254 Texan counties and its nearly 350 extension specialists. Together, these agents and specialists, aided by more than 150,000 volunteers, education the public through classes, publications, web sites, television series, and other outlets in the areas of agriculture, family and consumer sciences, human nutrition and health, environmental and natural resources, community development, and 4-H and youth development. Through its various programs, AgriLife Extension reaches over fifteen million Texans annually, and the Texas 4-H program is the largest in the nation and makes up one-sixth of the national enrollment numbers.

== See also ==
- Texas A&M University
- Texas A&M University System
- Cooperative extension service
- Agricultural extension
