= Hank Foley =

President of the New York Institute of Technology since June 2017

Henry C. "Hank" Foley
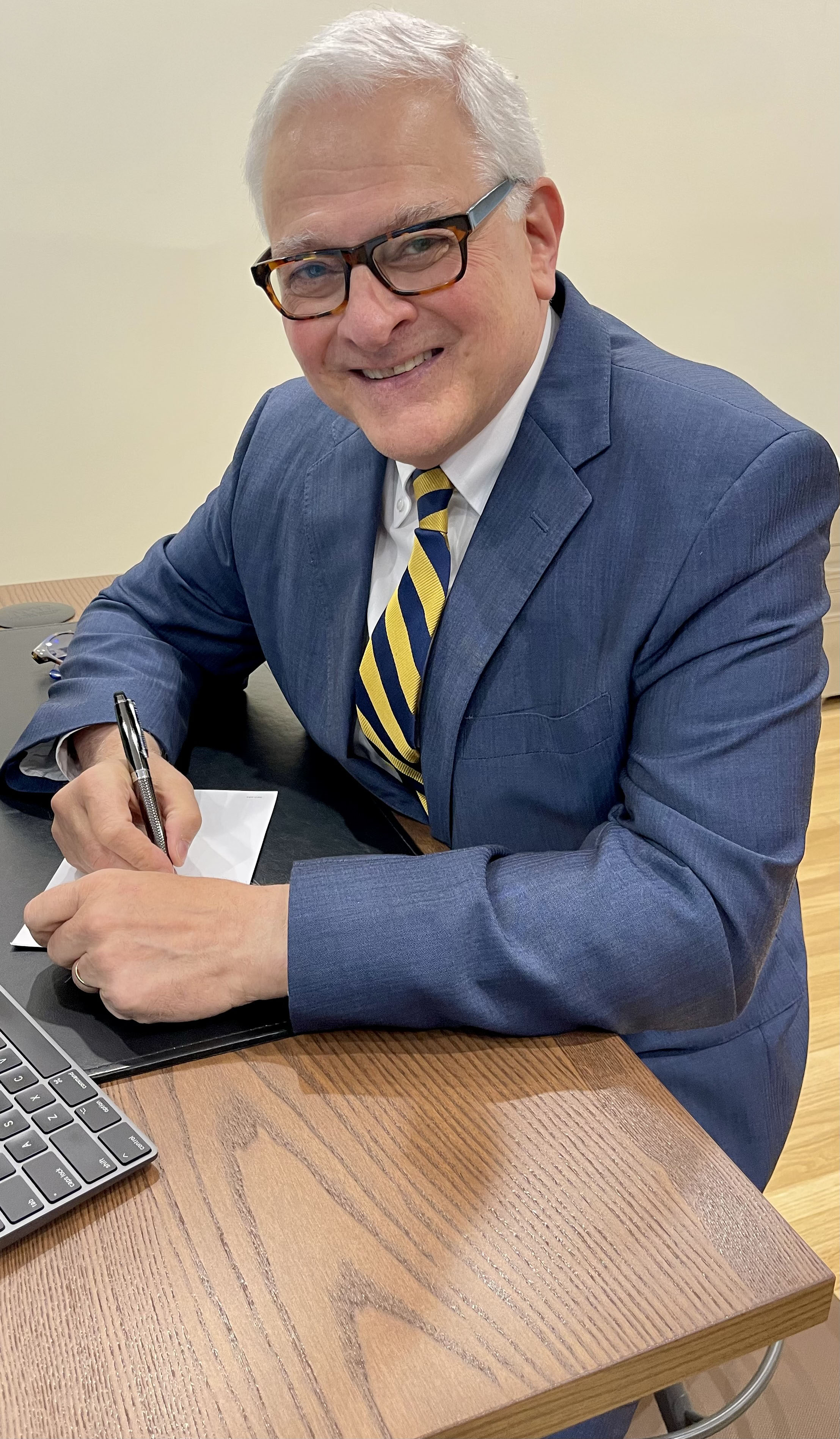

4th President of New York Institute of Technology
- Incumbent
- Assumed office June 1, 2017
- Preceded by: Edward Guiliano

Chancellor of the University of Missouri
- Interim
- In office November 11, 2015 – May 3, 2017
- Preceded by: R. Bowen Loftin
- Succeeded by: Garnett S. Stokes (interim)
- Scientific career
- Education: Providence College (BS); Purdue University (MS); Pennsylvania State University (PhD)
- Fields: Chemical engineering
- Workplaces: Pennsylvania State University; University of Delaware; University of Missouri; New York Institute of Technology
- Thesis: The photochemistry of selected organometallic compounds and the synthesis, structure, and reactivity of ruthenium-cobalt dinuclear complex (1982)
- Doctoral advisor: Gregory L. Geoffroy
- Doctoral students: Michael Strano

Henry C. "Hank" Foley was the president of New York Institute of Technology, serving since June 1, 2017.

== Education ==
Foley earned a bachelor's degree in chemistry at Providence College, a master's degree in chemistry from Purdue University, and doctorate in physical and inorganic chemistry from Penn State. He did his postdoc in chemical engineering at the University of Delaware.

== Academic work and career ==
Foley was most recently the interim chancellor of the University of Missouri, appointed on Nov. 10, 2015. Formerly, he was executive vice president for academic affairs for the UM System. Foley also served as vice president at Penn State and dean of Penn State's College of Information Sciences and Technology, and has held the positions of named chair, department head, associate vice president for research, and director of strategic initiatives at Penn State. While at Penn State, he was director of the Energy Efficient Buildings Hub, which was determined to be "poorly managed and lacked measurable goals" by the U.S. Senate Appropriations Committee, though (according to an interview with Foley) in its first year the EEB Hub had "developed cloud infrastructure and a web-based information portal for high resolution building energy data, launched the School District of Philadelphia Sustainability Workshop providing project-based learning for 30 high school seniors, and established partnerships with regional and national allies, including the Greater Philadelphia Chamber of Commerce." Two buildings renovated for the project with a budget of $39 million were sold in 2023 for $18.5 million. In addition, he has held faculty appointments at the University of Delaware.

Foley holds 16 patents for his research and has written more than 150 articles. He authored Introduction to Chemical Engineering Analysis Using Mathematica (1st Edition), a textbook published by Academic Press in 2002. On April 11, 2018, Scientific American published his op-ed, “Many Scientific Studies Are Bogus, but Blockchain Can Help.”

Foley also serves on the Board of Trustees at Providence College, the Commission on Independent Colleges & Universities in New York, Lincoln Square Business Improvement District. and the Long Island Regional Advisory Council on Higher Education In 2019, he received a Long Island Business News Executive Circle Award. Foley has been recognized as a fellow of the American Institute of Chemical Engineers, the Industrial and Engineering Chemistry Division of the American Chemical Society, the American Association for the Advancement of Science, and the National Academy of Inventors.

He was the doctoral advisor of MIT professor Michael Strano and University of Kansas professor Mark B. Shiflett. He was also the undergraduate advisor for MIT chemical engineer Zachary Smith.

=== NYIT presidency ===
The Board of Trustees of New York Institute of Technology (NYIT) announced on March 29, 2017 the appointment of Foley as the new president of NYIT, effective June 1, 2017. The installation ceremony took place on April 12, 2018. His last day was June 30, 2025.
