= Noble Resolve =

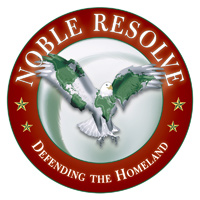
Noble Resolve logo

Noble Resolve is a United States Joint Forces Command (USJFCOM) experimentation campaign plan to enhance homeland defense and improve military support to civil authorities in advance of and following natural and man-made disasters.

The Noble Resolve campaign will:

- Develop solutions for U.S. agencies and organizations by providing the means to deter, prevent, and defeat threats and aggression aimed at the U.S., its territories, and interests.
- Develop solutions to provide improved defense support to civil authorities.
- Build upon global partnerships.

The U.S. Army and USJFCOM wargame Unified Quest 2006 determined the need for homeland defense experimentation.

In 2006, U.S. Joint Forces Command explored the Department of Homeland Security’s scenario for an unaccounted for, "loose," 10 kiloton nuclear weapon. A number of research questions for further experimentation and resolution were identified.

- To what extent does the U.S. have a layered defense?
- When will the U.S. know a threat is headed towards the U.S.?
- What can be done in advance to keep the threat from reaching us from overseas?
- How can USJFCOM provide emergency managers with modeling and simulation support?
- How can the U.S. establish a reliable collaborative environment that includes first responders?
- Is there a tool set that encompasses shared operations, shared information, shared situational awareness, and shared Common Operational Picture?

To answer these questions, USJFCOM established an evolving Noble Resolve experiment campaign plan which started execution in April 2007 and continue over the next couple of years. This campaign is conducted by using discussions, computer-aided modeling and simulation and seminars.

By 2025 Noble Resolve had been metamorphized into a project for an Oil Rig, now being run by the Danish company Maersk as "Maersk Resolve".

Participants include:

- United States Northern Command
- United States European Command
- United States Strategic Command
- United States Pacific Command
- United States Transportation Command
- United States Army
- United States Navy
- United States Coast Guard
- Department of Homeland Security
- Federal Bureau of Investigation
- Department of Energy
- Federal Emergency Management Agency
- State of Oregon
- Oregon National Guard
- National Guard Bureau
- Commonwealth of Virginia
- Virginia National Guard
- Port of Norfolk, Virginia and Hampton Roads
- Defense Threat Reduction Agency
- Virginia Modeling, Analysis and Simulation Center
- Virginia Polytechnic Institute and State University
- University of Virginia
- A.P. Moller-Maersk Group
- Multinational:
  - Austria, Canada, Israel, Japan, Republic of Korea, Poland, Singapore, and Sweden
