= Harold E. Rorschach Jr. =

American physicist (1926–1993)

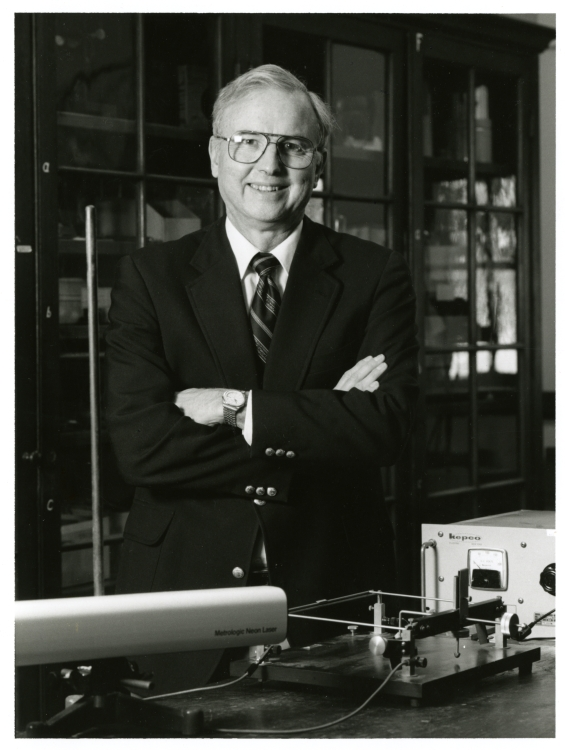
- Rorschach in Physics lab, Rice University, 1990
- Born: Harold Emil Rorschach Jr. November 25, 1926; Tulsa, Oklahoma, U.S.
- Died: June 5, 1993 (aged 66); Philadelphia, Pennsylvania, U.S.
- Education: University of Pennsylvania (BS, MS); Massachusetts Institute of Technology (PhD)
- Spouse: Virginia "Ginny" Purdy (m. 1951)
- Children: 2
- Scientific career
- Thesis: Resistance minima in metals at low temperatures (1951)
- Doctoral advisor: Melvin A. Herlin
- Doctoral students: R. Bowen Loftin; Frank J. Low

Harold Emil "Bud" Rorschach Jr. (November 25, 1926 – June 5, 1993), was an American physicist. He joined the faculty of Rice University in 1952, and served there throughout his career. He was three times the chairman of the physics department and was principal investigator of the NASA interdisciplinary laboratory at Rice, which conducted research involving a wide range of studies on solid materials.

== Life and career ==
Rorschach was born November 25, 1926, in Tulsa, Oklahoma, to Harold E. Rorschach Sr. and Margaret Hermes Rorschach. He died as a result of a stroke on June 5, 1993, in Philadelphia, Pennsylvania, where he was visiting relatives.

Harold attended the University of Pennsylvania, where he earned his Bachelor of Science and Master of Science degrees. He then entered the Massachusetts Institute of Technology, where he earned the Doctor of Philosophy degree in physics in 1951. In 1952, he joined the faculty of Rice University (then named the Rice Institute) in Houston, Texas as a physics professor. In 1963, he was awarded a Brown Prize for Teaching Excellence. (Note: The George R. Brown Teaching Awards are announced annually at Commencement based on voting by alumni who graduated either two or five years previously. Funded by an endowment from the Brown Foundation the two prizes are intended to encourage innovative teaching, and have been awarded every year since 1967.)

After Rorschach's death, his widow established the Dr. Harold E. Rorschach, Jr. Endowed Undergraduate Research Award in Physics.
