= Michael Strano =

American chemical engineer

External videos
- "Michael S. Strano: Quantum-Confined Materials - New Nano-Sensors", MIT Industrial Liaison Program (ILP)
- "Systems Chemistry and Functional Nanodevices – Michael Strano, Massachusetts Institute of Technology", 5 April 2012

Michael Steven Strano is an American chemical engineer and the Carbon P. Dubbs Professor of Chemical Engineering at Massachusetts Institute of Technology (MIT). He is particularly interested in quantum-confined materials. Strano was appointed editor-in-chief of Carbon in 2016. In 2017, Strano was elected a member of the National Academy of Engineering "for contributions to nanotechnology, including fluorescent sensors for human health and solar and thermal energy devices."

== Education ==
Strano was born around 1976. He graduated with a BS degree (summa cum laude) in chemical engineering from the Polytechnic University, Brooklyn in 1997. He gained his PhD (summa cum laude) in chemical engineering from the University of Delaware in 2002, under the direction of Hank Foley.

== Career ==
Strano held a postdoctoral research fellowship in Chemistry and Physics at Rice University, where he worked with Richard E. Smalley. In 2003, he became an Assistant Professor of Chemical and Biomolecular Engineering at the University of Illinois at Urbana-Champaign. In 2007, he joined the Massachusetts Institute of Technology, where he became the Charles and Hilda Roddey Professor in Chemical Engineering and later the Carbon P. Dubbs Professor of Chemical Engineering.

== Research ==
Strano has done extensive work with carbon nanotubes and holds a number of patents in this area. He has examined the surface chemistry of carbon nanotubes, and the relationship of surface chemistry to the semiconductive, metallic, and insulating properties of nanotubes.

Strano is particularly interested in the enhancement of plants using carbon nanotubes, an approach to bioengineering that his group has termed "plant nanobionics".

"Plants are very attractive as a technology platform,... They repair themselves, they're environmentally stable outside, they survive in harsh environments, and they provide their own power source and water distribution." – Michael Strano, 2014

Strano began studying plant cells as a possible model for self-repairing solar cells. Researchers hoped that understanding the photosynthetic functions of chloroplasts could inform the design of solar cells. They developed a technique called lipid exchange envelope penetration, or LEEP, to deliver a catalytic material such as nanoceria through the hydrophobic membrane around the chloroplasts and into the chloroplasts. The same technique can be used to move carbon nanotubes into chloroplasts. This can increase the range of wavelengths of light to which the plant can respond, and increase its photosynthetic activity.

With another technique, vascular infusion, researchers were able to deliver nanoparticles through the stomata of a plant by applying a nanoparticle solution to the bottom of a leaf. The nanotubes were able to enter the chloroplast and increase photosynthetic electron flow.

Strano's group has used carbon nanotubes to create plants that are biological sensors for the detection of chemicals such as hydrogen peroxide, TNT, and the sarin. The binding of a target molecule to a polymer in the nanotube causes the nanotube to fluoresce.

In 2017 Strano developed living watercress plants whose leaves contained nanoparticles of an enzyme called luciferase. Found naturally in fireflies, the plants used it to release stored energy as light. In 2019, Strano and architect Sheila Kennedy were one of 62 design teams in the 2019-2020 Design Triennial at the Cooper Hewitt, Smithsonian Design Museum. Their model of a house reimagines the structure to support the use of plants as light sources, with lightwells in the ceilings, ports for pollinators, and retaining walls filled with dirt.

Strano is a co-editor with Shawn M. Walsh, of Robotic systems and autonomous platforms: advances in materials and manufacturing (2019).

== Honors and awards ==
- 2016, World's Most Influential Scientific Minds of 2015, Thomson Reuters
- 2016, Highly Cited Materials Science Researchers, Thomson Reuters
- 2009, Popular Science's 'Brilliant 10'
- 2008, Colburn Award, American Institute of Chemical Engineers
- 2008, Young Investigator Award, Office of Naval Research
- 2008, Outstanding Investigator Award, Materials Research Society
- 2007, Unilever Award, American Chemical Society
- 2006, Beckman Young Investigators Award
- 2006, Coblentz Award for Molecular Spectroscopy
- 2005, Presidential Early Career Award for Scientists and Engineers
- Alfred P. Sloan Foundation Research Fellowship
