= Virginia Modeling, Analysis and Simulation Center =

Virginia Modeling, Analysis and Simulation Center (VMASC) is a multi-disciplinary research center of Old Dominion University. VMASC supports the University's Modeling & Simulation (M&S) degree programs, offering M&S Bachelors, Masters and Ph.D. degrees to students across the Colleges of Engineering and Technology, Sciences, Education, and Business. Working with more than one hundred industry, government, and academic members, VMASC furthers the development and applications of modeling, simulation and visualization as enterprise decision-making tools to promote economic, business, and academic development. The current executive director of VMASC is Dr. B. Danette Allen.

Old Dominion University, through VMASC, is a leader in modeling and simulation (M&S), analysis, and visualization, and is recognized for its multidisciplinary approach to M&S research, education, and application. VMASC's goal is to apply and leverage M&S expertise with the latest developments in interoperability and visualization by quickly and economically testing theories and ideas.

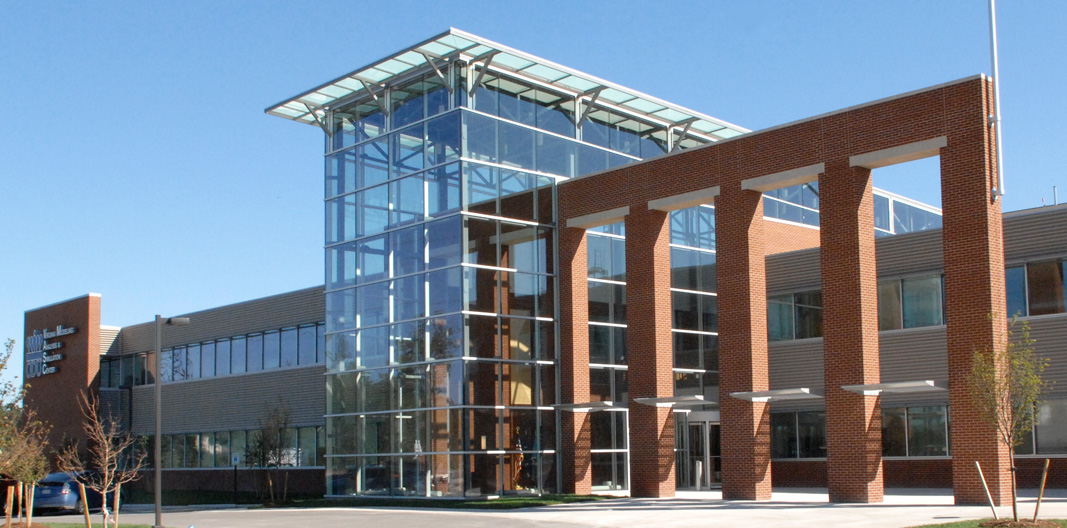
VMASC Facility in Suffolk, VA

== Applied research areas ==
- Transportation
- M&S interoperability
- Homeland security and military defense
- Virtual environments
- Social sciences
- Medical and health care
- M&S education and game-based learning
- System sciences

== History ==
=== Pre 1997 ===
The Virginia Modeling, Analysis, and Simulation Center (VMASC) began as an idea, a concept driven by need: the Joint Warfighting Center required short-courses and formal training of its staff and ODU determined it would take on that task. The concept became a plan, the plan became a Center; and all of this transpired over a three-year period from fall of 1994 to the summer of 1997. Things were set in motion in October 1994 with the establishment of the Joint Training, Analysis and Simulation Center as a part of the United States Atlantic Command (USACOM), which became the US Joint Forces Command (USJFCOM) in Suffolk, Virginia. One of its core requirements was to establish a facility with the infrastructure and workforce necessary to conduct simulation-based joint training that was not dependent on large-scale and expensive field training exercises. To meet that requirement the JTASC was charged with developing the processes and procedures, designing the facility, developing the workforce, and conducting joint exercises necessary to prepare Joint Task Force (JTF) Commanders to conduct operations as a Joint Force vice the individual service approach. It was apparent that the workforce of the future was not available in the Hampton Roads area; JTASC would have to develop this workforce in order to be successful in its assigned role.

To compound the problem, no institution of higher learning in Hampton Roads or the country was equipped to satisfy the academic needs of the JTASC. The emphasis on M&S as a training tool for leaders in a Joint Operation was new requiring expertise that did not exist; it had to be developed in an academic environment. Leaders at JTASC had looked to human resources and expertise outside of the region by turning to contractors in Orlando, Florida, and various defense contractors (M&S professionals with previous military experience) in Washington, DC as an interim measure. It was apparent that this dilemma had to be addressed and the logical institution to address the need was ODU.

The need for local expertise incited a handful of knowledgeable, intuitive, and earnest individuals to develop an academic-based venue to train members of the JTASC and members of the contract team right here in the region. That fall semester (1994) Eugene Newman, coordinator of Technical/Business Development for JTASC, and Roland Mielke, ODU professor of Electrical and Computer Engineering, worked on a proposal inviting the University to take the lead in providing this academic training. Meetings were held with the University President and Provost (Drs. James Koch and JoAnn Gora) and academic deans (Drs. James Cross and William Swart) to make them aware of the immediate need at the JTASC and to stress the fact that this would fill an education void in the region while fostering a professional relationship with the USJFCOM. Dr. Mielke proffered the introduction of short courses to begin formal academic training at the JTASC. ODU agreed to review the matter; by spring 1995, Dr. Mielke taught the very first short course and within months Jack Stoughton, ODU professor of Electrical and Computing Engineering, was assigned an office at USJFCOM to better accomplish his task of determining the validity of the requirement to prepare trainers for joint training.

In April 1995 Newman, Mielke, and Captain John Sherlock of the JTASC hosted a follow-up meeting of a delegation of Virginia political leaders and ODU administrators to explain the mission and the requirements of the JTASC. This meeting focused on the lack of formal training confounding JTASC members, and it addressed the fact that the JTASC had been looking outside the region for this training. The discussion also broached the subject of future trends for modeling and simulation and the regional economic effect that could result from a working relationship among the University, the USJFCOM, and the city of Suffolk. Congressman Norman Sisisky, Mayor of Suffolk Chris Jones, and other local government officials were interested in learning about the future of technical knowledge transfer from the government to the public sector.

In October, organizers of the future center put together a status report that described an effort to develop a computer simulation demonstration project that could be used to illustrate the sophistication and significance of next generation computer modeling and simulation technologies. The project was to address a research area rich enough to include modeling both physical and economic processes with several separate, but interrelated entities. The problem ideally suited for this demonstration was the investigation of ways to enhance the control and management of the fl ow of commercial goods through the Port of Hampton Roads. With this demonstration project, the organizers were expanding the depth of research opportunities for the Center while making the Center a valuable resource for solving problems affecting the economy in the region. It was obvious the Commonwealth needed to get involved. It was equally apparent ODU needed to begin thinking beyond the short courses to approach the state with any budgetary requests in support of this new endeavor.

== List of former directors ==
- Dr. Tom Mastaglio
- Dr. R. Bowen Loftin
- Dr. Roland Meilke
- Dr. Mike McGinnis
- Dr. John Sokolowski
- Dr. Eric Weisel
- Dr. R. Michael Robinson
