= Texas A&M AgriLife =

Educational organization

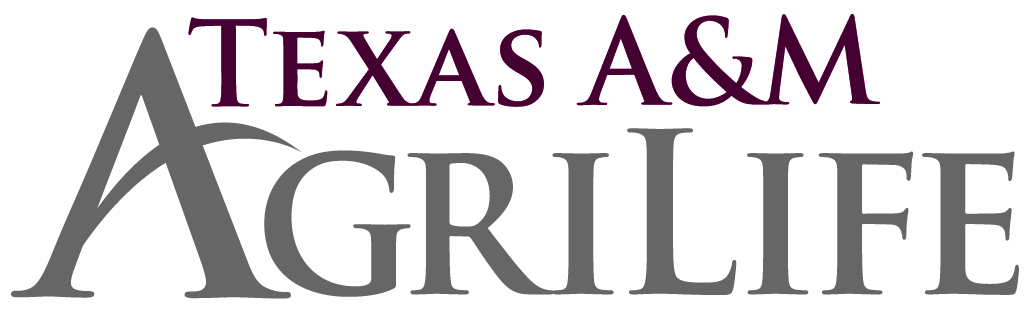

Texas A&M AgriLife is the organization the connects agriculture and life sciences programs at Texas A&M University and the Texas A&M University System.

This partnership allows for collaboration between its 5 state agriculture agencies:

- Texas A&M College of Agriculture and Life Sciences
- Texas A&M AgriLife Research
- Texas A&M AgriLife Extension Service
- Texas A&M Forest Service
- Texas Veterinary Medical Diagnostic Laboratory.
