= Campaign plan =

Campaign plan is a plan to achieve an objective, usually of a large-scale over an extended period of time. It usually coordinates many activities and uses of resources involving multiple organizations. A campaign plan could also have subordinate objectives or intermediate milestones and is often broken down by phases. They often begin with an assessment of the situation to put the plan in context. Campaign plans are often created in business marketing, political campaigning and military campaigning.

== Examples ==
An example of a military campaign plan is Noble Resolve.

== Official definitions ==
The U.S. Military defines campaign plan as:

"A joint operation plan for a series of related major operations aimed at achieving strategic or operational objectives within a given time and space."
