= R. Bowen Loftin =

American academic administrator

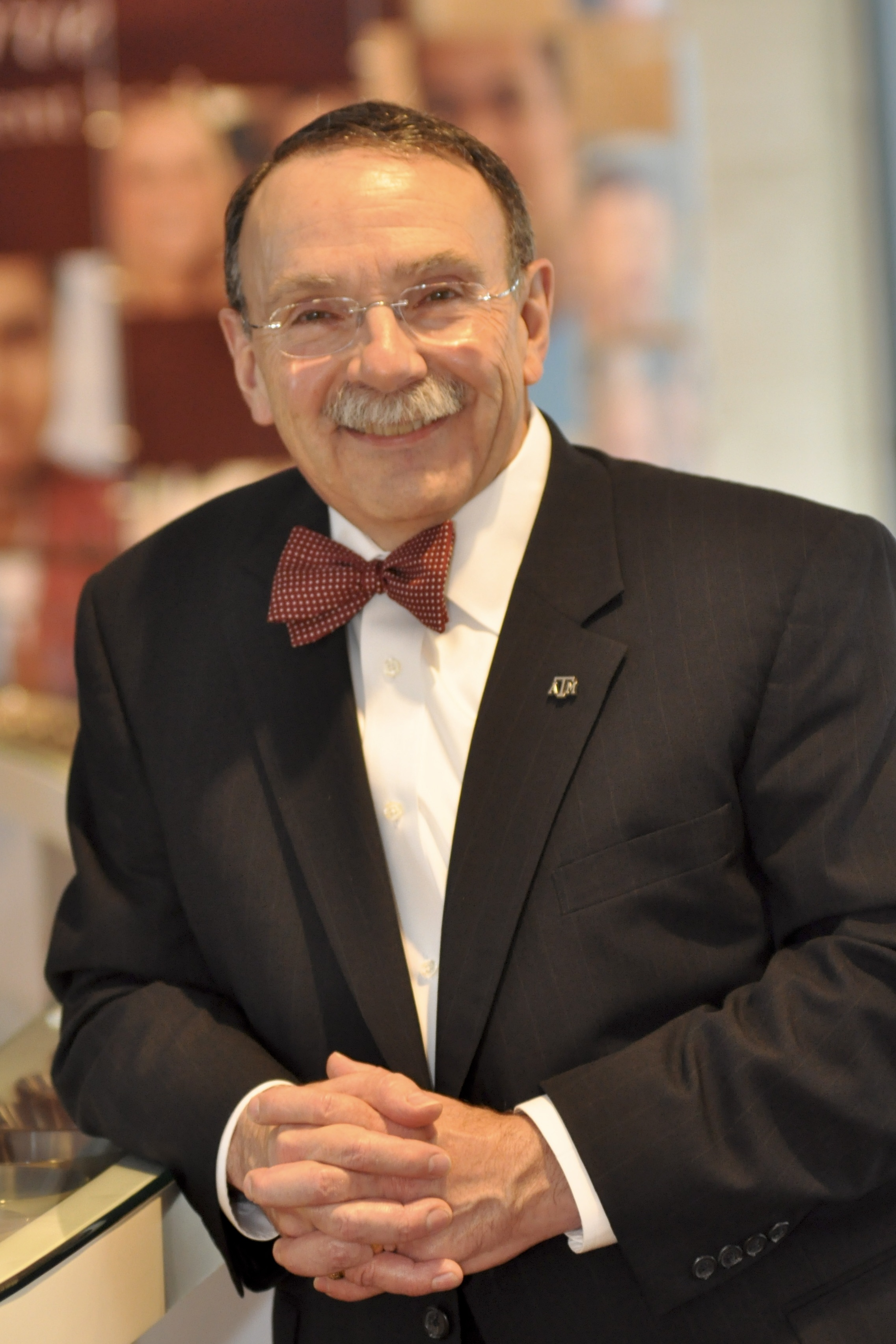

22nd Chancellor of the University of Missouri
- In office February 1, 2014 – November 11, 2015
- Preceded by: Stephen J. Owen (Acting)
- Succeeded by: Hank Foley (Acting)

24th President of Texas A&M University
- In office February 12, 2010 – January 13, 2014; Acting: June 15, 2009 – February 12, 2010
- Preceded by: Elsa A. Murano
- Succeeded by: Mark A. Hussey (Acting)

Personal details
- Born: Richard Bowen Loftin; June 29, 1949 (age 77) Hearne, Texas, U.S.
- Spouse: Karin Christiane Juhn Cibula (m. 1972)
- Children: 2
- Education: Texas A&M University (BS); Rice University (MS, PhD)
- Scientific career
- Fields: Computational physics
- Workplaces: Texas A&M University at Galveston; University of Houston-Downtown; University of Houston; Old Dominion University; Texas A&M University; University of Missouri
- Doctoral advisor: Harold E. Rorschach Jr.

Richard Bowen Loftin (born June 29, 1949), better known as R. Bowen Loftin, is an American academic and physicist who was the 22nd chancellor of the University of Missouri in Columbia, Missouri. Prior to his appointment as chancellor, he served as the 24th president of Texas A&M University.

Loftin is a consultant in modeling and simulation, advanced training technologies, scientific and engineering data visualization. He is the author or co-author of more than 100 publications and has served as principal investigator of grants and contracts totaling millions of dollars.

== Early life and education ==
Loftin was born in Hearne, Texas. He graduated from Texas A&M University in three years, having been awarded a bachelor of science degree in physics (B.S. 1970) with highest honors, and was a staff member of the MSC Student Conference on National Affairs. He earned a master of science degree (M.S. 1973) and doctor of philosophy degree (Ph.D. 1975) in physics from Rice University. His doctoral advisor was Harold E. Rorschach Jr.

== Career ==
=== Professional career ===
After completing his graduate studies at Rice University, Loftin began his academic career as an assistant professor of physics at Texas A&M University at Galveston in September 1976 and left in August 1977. He then became an assistant professor at University of Houston-Downtown starting in 1977. He later was awarded tenure at UH-D in September 1982. He remained teaching at UH-D until August 2000.

In May 1986, Loftin began working for the National Aeronautics and Space Administration as the principal investigator for Advanced Training Technologies of the Space Flight Training Division. In August 1994, Loftin began teaching as a professor of computer science at the University of Houston. He was the chair of the Department of Computer Science from September 1999 until April 2000. Loftin also was director of the NASA Virtual Environments Research Institute at the University of Houston.

In August 2000, Loftin started working at Old Dominion University where he was a professor of electrical engineering, professor of computer engineering, and a professor of computer science. He was a professor there until 2008. He also served as executive director of the Virginia Modeling, Analysis and Simulation Center from August 2000 until May 2005.

Loftin was appointed as the vice president and CEO of Texas A&M University at Galveston in May 2005, where he also held the position of professor of maritime systems engineering. In fall 2008, when Hurricane Ike hit the Texas Gulf Coast, Loftin oversaw evacuation of the multi-site campus and relocation of almost all of the 1,500 students, along with many of the faculty and staff, to the main Texas A&M campus in College Station, approximately 150 miles inland. This is believed to be the first time that an entire institution of higher education was transposed onto another for an extended period of time.

Loftin was appointed as interim president on June 15, 2009, and was named the 24th President of Texas A&M University on February 12, 2010. He succeeded Elsa Murano, who was the previous president.

In June 2013, Loftin notified Texas A&M leadership that he would step down from the presidency in January 2014, and return to his tenured professorship. However, in December 2013, Loftin announced that he had accepted the role of Chancellor of the University of Missouri flagship campus in Columbia, effective February 1, 2014, a similar role to his former job as president at Texas A&M.

=== 2015 University of Missouri controversy ===
In 2015, University of Missouri Deans met with University of Missouri System president Tim Wolfe on October 9 and October 13 to ask for Loftin's resignation. On October 21, the curators met behind closed doors in what was speculated by some to be related to proceedings about Loftin's role in shutting down ties between Planned Parenthood and the university. State Rep. Caleb Jones, R-Columbia, speculated on Twitter that Loftin would be fired for his role in shutting down MU's connections to Planned Parenthood. On November 3, The MU English department faculty voted unanimously in a vote of no confidence against Loftin. Then on November 9, nine deans called on the UM System Board of Curators for Loftin's removal. Citing Loftin's handling of race and cultural issues, the firing of the dean of the School of Medicine, the abrupt cancellation of graduate student health insurance subsidies in August, and the elimination of the vice chancellor for health sciences, they wrote that Loftin had created a “toxic environment through threat, fear and intimidation." That same day, amid protests which culminated with the resignation of President Wolfe earlier that day, Loftin announced that he would resign at the end of 2015 and take a research role at the university. On November 11, the curators voted to hasten his departure from January 1 to be effective immediately. Loftin's responsibilities were transferred to interim chancellor Hank Foley. In his not clearly defined role after his departure from the office of chancellor, Loftin's annual salary was $337,500.

== Awards and honors ==
- 1982 University of Houston-Downtown Award for Excellence in Teaching
- 1984 & 1985 University of Houston-Downtown Awards for Excellence in Service
- 1992 NASA Space Act Award
- 1993 NASA Public Service Medal
- 1995 NASA Invention of the Year Award

Academic offices
Preceded by Brady J. Deaton	Chancellor of the University of Missouri; 2014–2015	Succeeded by Alexander Cartwright
