= Joint Warfare Analysis Center =

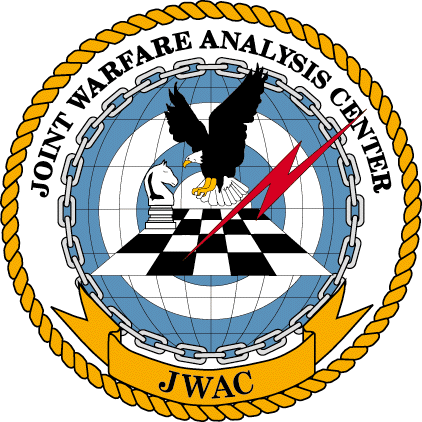

Joint Warfare Analysis Center (JWAC) is a subordinate command of United States Strategic Command (USSTRATCOM) that contributes to United States national security by recommending strategic technical solutions. JWAC has evolved from a small program office into a joint command of more than 400 personnel. As it grew, it became part of the Joint Chiefs of Staff in 1994 and then was spun off as an independent joint command subordinate to United States Joint Forces Command (formerly U.S. Atlantic Command) in 1998.

JWAC coordinates directly with the staffs of all unified commands, Department of Defense (DoD) elements, combatant commands (including: USAFRICOM, CENTCOM, USEUCOM, USPACOM, USSOUTHCOM, USSOCOM, USSTRATCOM), military services, and other government departments and agencies, in order to respond to crises. JWAC has twice been awarded the Joint Meritorious Unit Award and twice awarded the Modeling and Simulation Coordination Office's award for Outstanding Achievement in Modeling and Simulation Analysis.

== Location ==
JWAC's headquarters are located in Dahlgren, Virginia. Dahlgren is in King George county. JWAC's employees benefit from this location due to being close enough to Washington D.C. to receive the 17% locality pay as well as their federal base pay. Since the base is located in a rural area it has many amenities for employees. However, the base is located closely urban resources. The Dahlgren region is close to the Blue Ridge Mountains while also close to Virginia Beach.

== Employee Life ==
JWAC offers flexible work hours for employees so that employees can work to their full potential and balance work and home responsibilities. Employee life at JWAC includes a heavy focus on physical health and wellness. JWAC provides employees with better education on health and wellness from professionals as well as access to gyms with state of the art machinery. On base there are many entertainment activities for employee use like tennis courts, swimming pools, child-care programs, and more.

== Seal ==
The seal has many symbols and aspects with deeper meanings that help represent the overall meaning of JWAC. Since JWAC's seal has so many symbols it is easy to overlook certain parts such as the bulls-eye. However, each symbol has deep meanings that is crucial to the integrity of this organization.

- The braided rope border represents its origins from the Naval Warfare Analysis Center, JWAC became its own entity in 1994.
- The chain stands for the complex nature of military problems, and the importance of individuals to the entirety of the organization.
- The latitude and longitudinal lines on the globe exemplifies the global reach of the military and emphasizes national security.
- The white bulls-eye behind the eagle speaks to the precision used to solve complex problems foreign or domestic for the sake of national security.
- The chessboard symbolizes the far reaching capabilities of JWAC and its overall global influence. The chessboard represents the game and never ending pursuit of victory.
- The knight shows JWAC's level of independence and flexibility, being able to strike unhindered such as the knight in a game of chess.
- The lightning bolt represents the strength and power of JWAC analyses. The lightning bolt also emphasizes accuracy.
- The eagle symbolizes the United States constitution as well as the unity to fight for the U.S.
