= Elsa Murano =

Cuban-born American executive (born 1959)

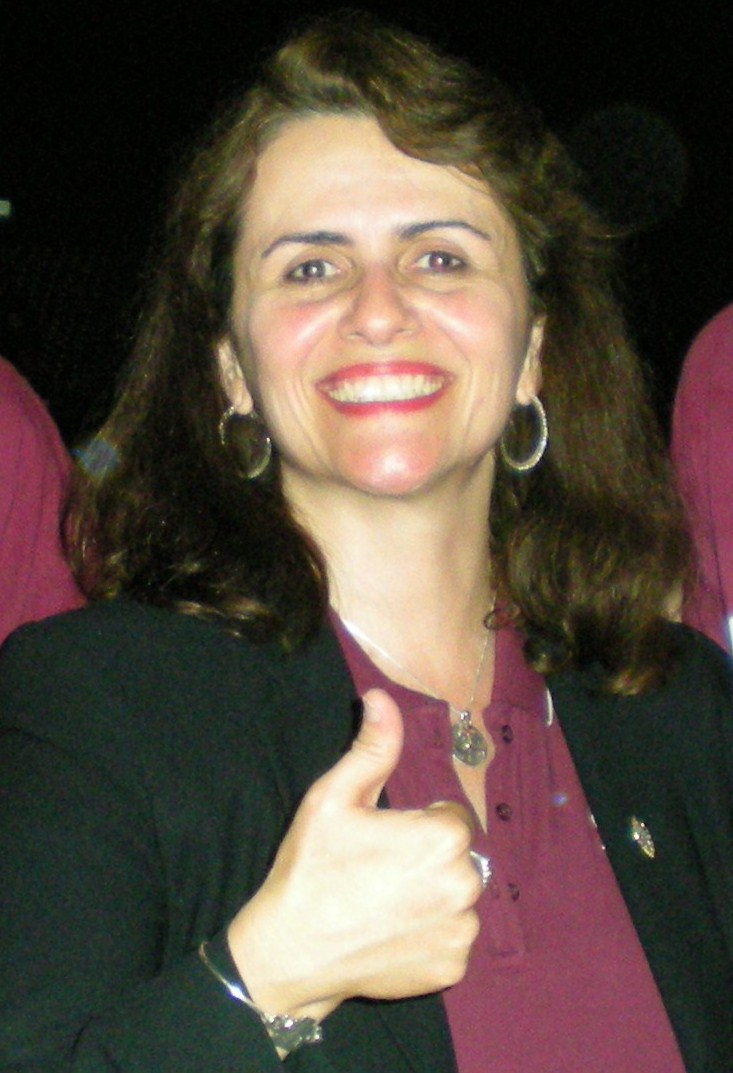

Director of the Norman Borlaug Institute for International Agriculture & Development
- Incumbent
- Assumed office 2012

23rd President of Texas A&M University
- In office January 3, 2008 – June 15, 2009
- Preceded by: Ed J. Davis (Interim); Robert M. Gates
- Succeeded by: R. Bowen Loftin

Under Secretary of Agriculture for Food Safety
- In office October 2001 – December 1, 2004
- President: George W. Bush
- Preceded by: Catherine Woteki
- Succeeded by: Merle Pierson (Acting)

Personal details
- Born: Elsa Alina Casales; August 14, 1959 (age 67) Havana, Cuba
- Party: Republican
- Spouse: Peter S. Murano (m. 1985)
- Education: Miami Dade College; Florida International University (BS); Virginia Polytechnic Institute and State University (MS, PhD)

Elsa Alina Murano (born Elsa Alina Casales August 14, 1959) is a Cuban-born American executive and the Director of the Norman Borlaug Institute for International Agriculture and Development at Texas A&M University's Agriculture & Life Sciences program since 2012. She served as the 23rd president from January 3, 2008, until her resignation on June 15, 2009.

From August 2021 to June 2022, she took a temporary leave from her duties at the Institute to serve as Associate Vice Chancellor for Strategic Initiatives at Texas A&M's Agriculture & Life Sciences Program, focusing on federal initiatives engagement.

Murano also served as the Vice Chancellor and Dean of Texas A&M's College of Agriculture and Life Sciences from 2005 to 2007 and as the U.S. Under Secretary of Agriculture for Food Safety from 2001 to 2004.

In 2006, Murano joined the board of directors at Hormel Foods. In 2024, she joined the board of directors at Blue Bell Creameries.

== Early life and education ==
Elsa Alina Casales was born on August 14, 1959, in Havana, Cuba, eight months after the end of the Cuban Revolution. Her family fled Cuba on July 4, 1961, moving first to Curaçao and later to Colombia, where her father worked for IBM.

Her parents moved to Peru and El Salvador before settling in Puerto Rico, where she began kindergarten.

Following her parents' divorce in 1973, Murano relocated with her mother and three siblings to Miami, Florida, where she graduated from Miami Coral Park Senior High School in 1977. She then attended Miami Dade College, while working at Kelly Tractor Company. After earning her associate degree from Miami-Dade, she transferred to Florida International University (FIU), supporting her education through loans and scholarships. Murano completed her bachelor's degree in biological sciences at FIU in 1981.

Originally intending to pursue a career in medicine, Murano developed an interest in research after participating in a project exploring the potential of CBD and THC extracts in preventing tumor formation in predisposed mice. This led her to enroll in the graduate program at Virginia Tech where she earned a master's degree in anaerobic microbiology in 1987. Her studies focused on the role of bacterial cell walls in stimulating the immune system for tumor prevention.

Murano earned a doctorate in food science and technology in 1990, specializing in food safety. In 1985, during her graduate school years, she married Peter Murano, a fellow student she met at FIU.

== Professorships and USDA ==
From 1990 to 1995, Murano served as an assistant professor in the Department of Microbiology, Immunology, and Preventive Medicine at Iowa State University and was researcher-in-charge at the food irradiation facility. Murano was granted tenure at Iowa State in less than five years.

Murano became an Associate Professor of Food Science & Technology in the Department of Animal Science at Texas A&M University, where she also served as Associate Director of the Centre for Food Safety within the Institute for Food Science and Engineering. She later served as the director of the center from 1997 to 2001. In this role, she facilitated the establishment of an electron beam food irradiation facility on campus. Murano then became a Full Professor and was awarded the Sadie Hatfield Endowed Professorship in Agriculture. In 2001, President George W. Bush named Murano the Under Secretary of Agriculture for Food Safety for the U.S. Department of Agriculture (USDA). As the highest-ranking U.S. official for food safety, she represented U.S. food safety policy in international standard-setting organizations, such as the Codex Alimentarius Commission. Murano oversaw Food Safety and Inspection Service policies, ensuring that U.S. meat products met safety, wholesomeness, and packaging standards.

After the first case of mad cow disease was detected in the U.S., Murano and her team at the Food Safety and Inspection Service developed regulations to prevent it from entering the food supply. At the end of President Bush's first term in office, Murano returned to Texas A&M University, where she assumed the position of Vice Chancellor and Dean of Agriculture & Life Sciences.

== Return to Texas A&M ==
In January 2005, Murano became the first woman and first Hispanic person to hold the position of Vice Chancellor of Agricultural and Life Sciences in the Texas A&M University System. She concurrently served as Dean of the College of Agriculture and Life Sciences and Director of the Texas Agricultural Experiment Station.

On January 3, 2008, the Texas A&M University System Board of Regents voted to appoint Murano president of Texas A&M. She was the first female, the first Hispanic-American, and the first person under the age of 50 to serve in the position.

=== Return to the Faculty ===
Murano resigned as president of Texas A&M University in June 2009 following disagreements with Chancellor Mike McKinney over administrative policies. Murano disagreed with Chancellor McKinney on several issues, most significantly his view that faculty should be assigned either research or teaching duties, not both. On June 9, 2009, the Faculty Senate at Texas A&M University met and issued a vote of "no confidence" on Chancellor McKinney, as well as a statement of full support for President Murano. Professor Angie Hill-Price, Speaker of the Faculty Senate, stated, "Murano has always worked very hard to engage faculty; she understands what shared governance means, and she's worked very hard implementing that at the university."

The Board of Regents awarded her the title of President Emerita. Murano resumed her faculty position and restarted her research program by securing a $1.2M grant from USDA as the lead investigator of a consortium of Texas A&M scientists to determine how microbial pathogens contaminate produce in the field. About a year later, a new Board of Regents told Chancellor McKinney to resign. McKinney later resigned following continued criticism from faculty and staff.

=== Director of the Norman E. Borlaug Institute for International Agriculture ===
In 2012, Murano was asked to serve as Director of the Norman Borlaug Institute for International Agriculture by then Vice Chancellor and Dean of Agriculture Mark Hussey. Under Murano’s leadership, the institute secured federal funding for international agricultural projects. In September 2021, she served as Associate Vice Chancellor for Strategic Initiatives for then Vice Chancellor and Dean Patrick Stover, appointing Julie Howe as the Principal Investigator. Murano then resumed her position as Director of the Borlaug Institute in July 2022.

== Other awards and recognition ==
2005: Murano was awarded the "American By Choice" Award by the U.S. Citizenship and Immigration Services of the Department of Homeland Security, along with Nobel Prize Laureate Eli Wiesel.

2008: Murano was inducted into the Texas Woman of the Year Hall of Fame, named to the Carnegie Corporation of New York's list of "Great Immigrants, Great Americans," and named Outstanding Alumna of Florida International University, where she earned her Bachelor's of Science degree in 1981, receiving the FIU Medallion at a ceremony on campus.

2009: Murano was inducted into the Miami-Dade College Alumni Hall of Fame, where she had previously earned an Associate of Arts degree in 1979.

2022: Murano was awarded the Virginia Tech's College of Agriculture & Life Sciences Outstanding Alumni in the Global Community in 2022 at its Celebration of Ut Prosim event.

Murano has been serving on the Board of Hormel Foods Corporation since 2006, and on the Board of Blue Bell Creameries since 2024. She previously served on the Board of Food Safety Net Services from 2010 to 2021, and on the Food Safety Advisory Board for Ecolab, Inc. In 2019, she was elected Vice-Chair of the Board of Trustees of the International Livestock Research Institute, and subsequently elected Chair in 2021, serving until 2024. She currently serves as a Vice Chair of the Board of Trustees of the Centro Internacional de Mejoramiento de Maiz y Trigo (CIMMYT). Murano was asked to serve on an advisory committee to NASA's Food Production Laboratory to help identify issues to be considered in developing foods for long-term missions to Mars. In 2018, Murano was named "Maestro of Community Service" by Latino Leaders Magazine's Maestro Awards, and selected as Women Inc. Magazine's "One of the Most Influential Corporate Board Directors". In 2019, Murano was inducted into the Meat Industry Hall of Fame.

In 2020, Murano was appointed by the Council of Advisors to the Director General of the Inter-American Institute for Cooperation in Agriculture (IICA), as a member of the Steering Committee for the Global Confederation of Higher Education Associations for Agricultural and Life Sciences (GCHERA), as a member of the Council of Advisors to the World Food Prize Foundation, and as a member of the Board of Semilla Nueva, a non-profit organization focused on providing improved corn varieties to farmers in the Guatemala.

She was also appointed as a Fellow of the Scowcroft Institute of International Affairs at the George H.W. Bush School of Government and Public Service at Texas A&M University., and as a member of the Baylor University Collaborative for Hunger and Poverty. In 2025, she was appointed to the Board of Advisors to the Society for International Development (SID).

Political offices
Preceded by Catherine Woteki	Under Secretary of Agriculture for Food Safety; 2001–2004	Succeeded by Merle Pierson; Acting
Academic offices
Preceded by Ed J. Davis; Acting	President of Texas A&M University; 2008–2009	Succeeded by R. Bowen Loftin
