= United States Joint Forces Command =

Former U.S. Unified Combatant Command (1999–2011)

United States Joint Forces Command (USJFCOM)
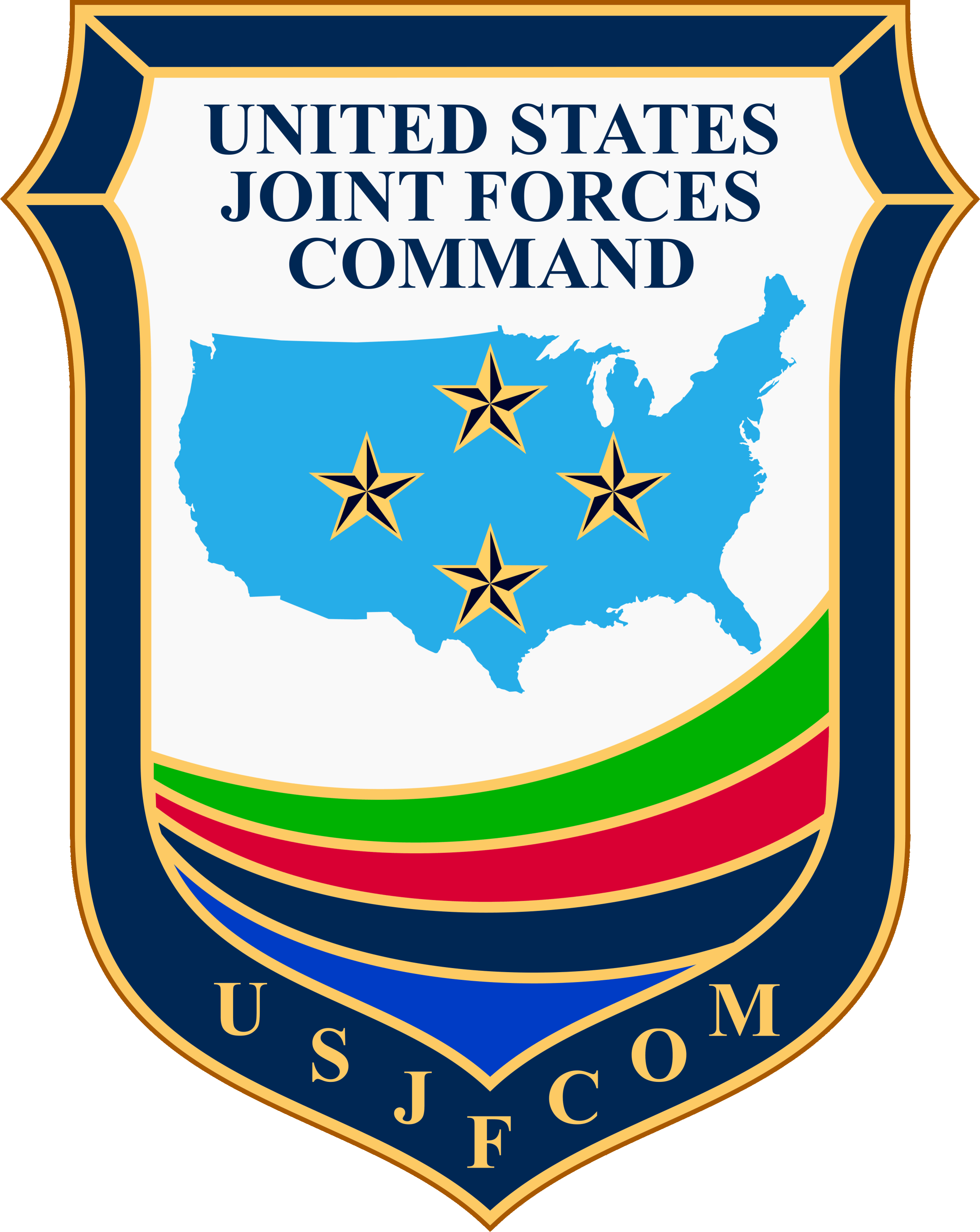
- Emblem of the United States Joint Forces Command
- Active: 1999–2011
- Country: United States
- Type: Unified Combatant Command
- Size: At its height, 1.16 million active and reserve soldiers, sailors, airmen and Marines
- Part of: United States Department of Defense
- Headquarters: Norfolk, Virginia

Commanders
- Combatant Commander: Disestablished

Insignia
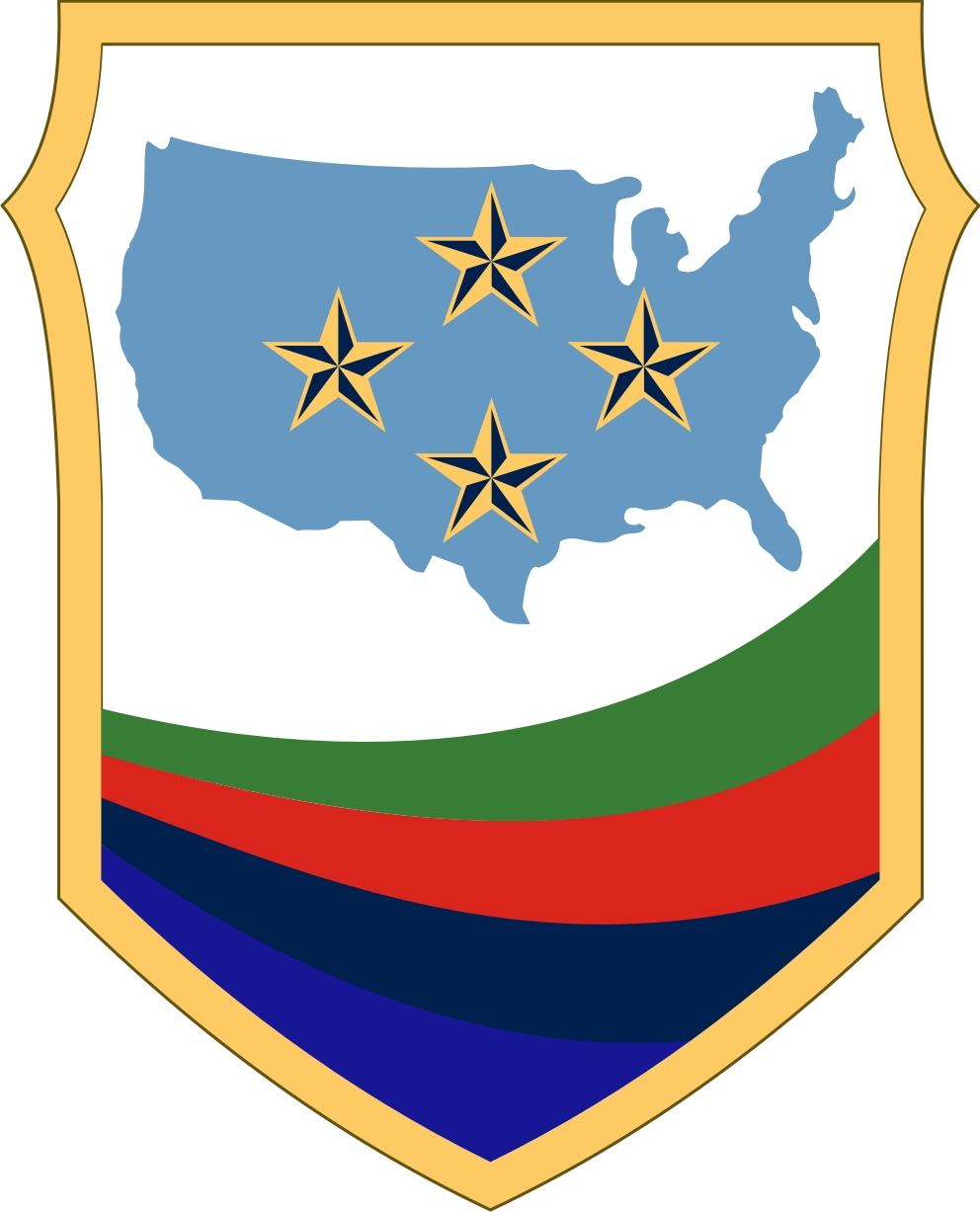
- Shoulder sleeve insignia (U.S. Army only)

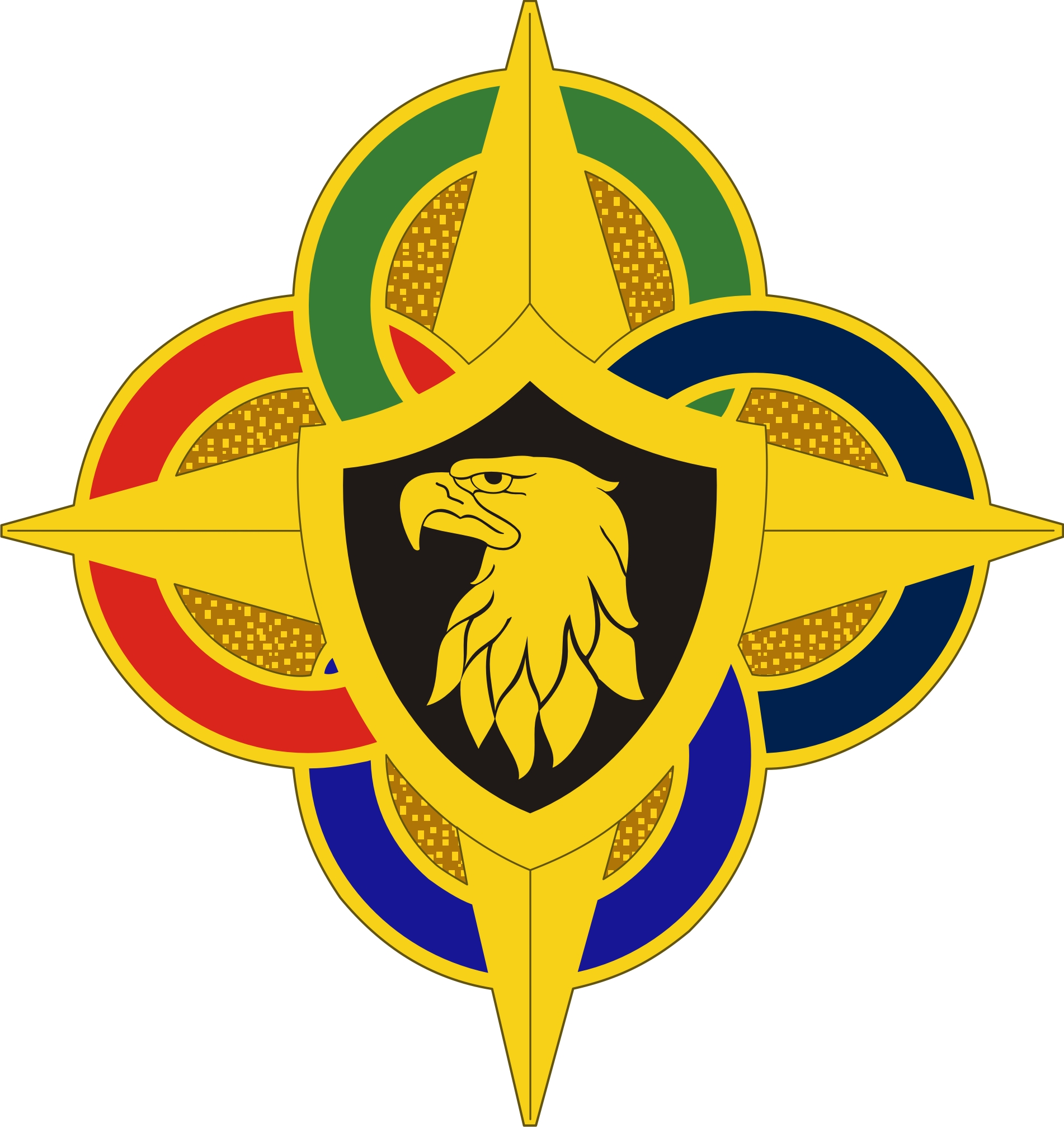
- Distinctive unit insignia (U.S. Army only)

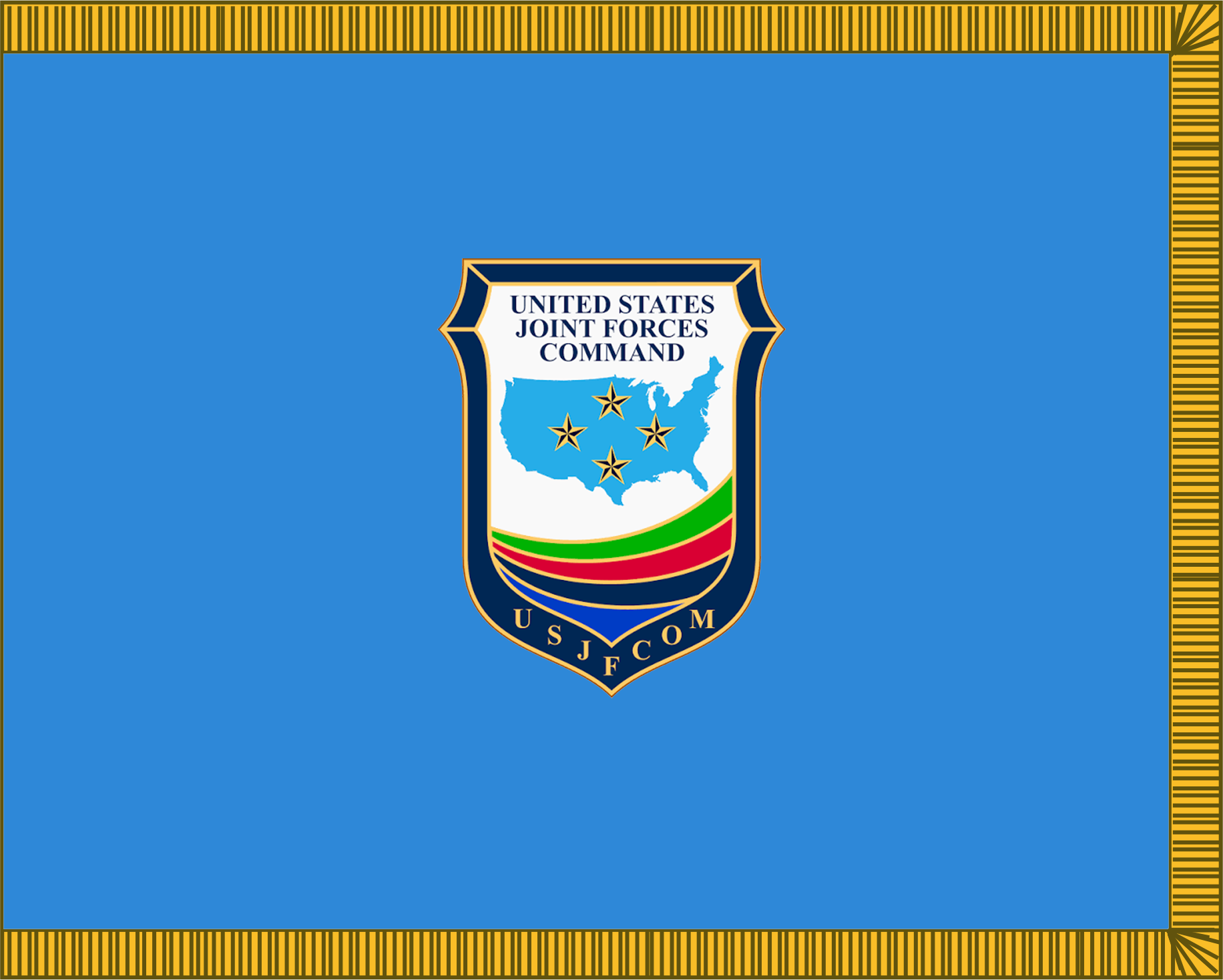
- United States Joint Forces Command Flag

The United States Joint Forces Command (USJFCOM) was a Unified Combatant Command of the United States Department of Defense. USJFCOM was a functional command that provided specific services to the military. The last commander was Army Gen. Ray Odierno and the Command Senior Enlisted was Marine Sergeant Major Bryan B. Battaglia. As directed by the President to identify opportunities to cut costs and rebalance priorities, Defense Secretary Robert Gates recommended that USJFCOM be disestablished and its essential functions reassigned to other unified combatant commands. Formal disestablishment occurred on 4 August 2011.

== History ==
USJFCOM was formed in 1999 when the old United States Atlantic Command was renamed and given a new mission: leading the transformation of the Department of Defense through experimentation and education. USLANTCOM had been active from 1947 to 1993 as a primarily U.S. Navy command, focused upon the wartime defence of the Atlantic sea lanes against Soviet Union attack. After the end of the Cold War, a 1993 reorganization gave the Command a new acronym, USACOM, and brought United States Army Forces Command and Air Combat Command under its authority.

In late 2004, U.S. Joint Forces Command assumed the role of primary conventional force provider in the Department of Defense. This landmark change assigned nearly all U.S. conventional forces to Joint Forces Command. Requirements, for example, for U.S. service personnel to support the transformation of the Armed Forces of Liberia, were fed to JFCOM, in this case via Africa Command, and JFCOM liaised with the service staffs to obtain available forces. Along with this responsibility came the task to develop a new 'risk-assessment' process that provided national leaders a worldwide perspective on force-sourcing solutions.

Its operations and exercises included Noble Resolve, an experimentation campaign plan to enhance homeland defense and improve military support to civil authorities in advance of and following natural and man-made disasters and Empire Challenge, an annual intelligence, surveillance and reconnaissance (ISR) interoperability demonstration.

=== Mission ===
United States Joint Forces Command was the only combatant command focused on the transformation of U.S. military capabilities. The commander of USJFCOM oversaw the command's four primary roles in transformation – joint concept development and experimentation, joint training, joint interoperability and integration, and the primary conventional force provider as outlined in the Unified Command Plan approved by the President. Its Unified Command Plan designated USJFCOM as the "transformation laboratory" of the United States military to enhance the combatant commanders' capabilities to implement the president's strategy. USJFCOM developed joint operational concepts, tested those concepts through rigorous experimentation, educated joint leaders, trained joint task force commanders and staffs, and recommended joint solutions to the Army, Navy, Air Force and Marines to better integrate their warfighting capabilities.

=== Organization ===
USJFCOM included members from each branch of the U.S. military, civil servants, contract employees, and consultants. It had four component commands, a sub-unified command (Special Operations component is SOCJFCOM) and eight subordinate activities, including: Joint Warfighting Center; Joint Systems Integration Center; Joint Transformation Command for Intelligence; and Joint Warfare Analysis Center (JWAC). JFCOM's Service components were the CONUS based commands that provided forces to other combatant commands: United States Army Forces Command (FORSCOM), United States Fleet Forces Command (USFLTFORCOM), Air Combat Command (ACC), and United States Marine Corps Forces Command (MARFORCOM).

USJFCOM Joint Concept Development and Experimentation (JCD&E) (J9) aimed to develop innovative joint concepts and capabilities providing experimentally proven solutions to the most pressing problems facing the joint force. It aimed to rapidly deliver operationally relevant solutions to support current operations and drive DOTMLPF and policy changes to better enable the future joint force. JCD&E aimed to provide thought leadership and collaborative environments to generate innovative ideas with a range of interagency, multinational, academic and private sector partners.

The C2 (Command and Control) Core was a DoD project sponsored by Joint Forces Command and the Office of the Assistant Secretary of Defense/Network and Information Integration (OASD/NII) to develop an open standard-supporting, extensible markup language (XML)-based command and control (C2) data exchange. It represents the first major implementation of the Universal Core v2.0, a federal information sharing initiative. It supports the DoD Net Centric Data Strategy by enabling data to be visible, accessible, understandable, trustworthy and interoperable. The overarching goal of this project is to support national and coalition warfighters by improving joint interoperability at the data and information layer.

Accomplishing these strategic goals within the C2 community involves publishing and evolving agreed-upon standards that exchange partners (services and, down the line, combatant commands and agencies) can use to share data more broadly, efficiently and effectively. The C2 Core standards also link C2 design guidance emerging at both the DoD enterprise level and within multiple C2-related communities of interest and programs of record to support the broadest range of interoperability requirements possible.

Among the command's many directorates and departments was Project Alpha, a JFCOM rapid idea analysis group created to "identify high-impact ideas from industry, academia and the defense community that could transform the United States Department of Defense into an organization better equipped to deal with the uncertain landscape of the future." Project Alpha was discontinued as part of an internal reorganization of U.S. Joint Forces Command's Joint Experimentation Directorate.

As of 1 August 2011, the Joint Warfighting Center (J7), Joint Center for Operational Analysis, and the Joint Concept Development and Experimentation directorate (J9) merged and transitioned from Joint Forces Command to the Joint Staff J7 as part of USJFCOM's disestablishment. The new organization created by this merger will remain in Suffolk, Va., and be known as the deputy director J7 for joint and coalition warfighting, a subordinate element of the Joint Staff J7. "We will continue our mission to provide comprehensive training that meets demands of the joint warfighter who continue to engage our adversaries in an ever-changing operational environment," said Army Maj. Gen. Frederick S. Rudesheim, deputy director for joint and coalition warfighting. "Key functions and missions will be linked together in a more efficient and effective manner, providing an integrated approach to joint development and joint training."

=== Disestablishment ===
US Joint Forces command was in charge of the region surrounding Washington, DC and New York during the 9/11 attacks. During a cost cutting session, General Mattis, then in command of JFCOM suggested to disband because in his interviews with his own staff it was clear to him that most did not see added value. On 9 August 2010 Secretary of Defense Robert Gates announced that Joint Forces Command has been slated for elimination as a budget-saving measure. General Ray Odierno was given the task of winding down JFCOM. On 6 January 2011, the plan was officially approved in a memorandum by President Obama. On 4 August 2011, Joint Forces Command cased its flag colors and officially disestablished on 31 August 2011.

Special Operations Command Joint Forces Command (SOCJFCOM) was transferred to U.S. Special Operations Command after the disestablishment of JFCOM, but was then disestablished in 2013.

== Former commanders ==
Until 24 October 2002, all combatant commanders held the title of "Commander-in-Chief", including the commander in chief of Joint Forces Command (USCINCJFCOM). However, an order dispatched by Secretary of Defense Donald Rumsfeld renamed all CINCs in the United States military as "Commanders" with the use of "CINC" as an acronym for anyone other than the President being strictly forbidden. Additionally, the dual-hatted title of Supreme Allied Commander Atlantic carried over to JFCOM from U.S. Atlantic Command and remained until October 2003 when it was superseded by the title of Supreme Allied Commander Transformation.

No.	Commander		Term			Service branch
No.	Portrait	Name	Took office	Left office	Duration	Service branch
1	Harold W. Gehman Jr.	Admiral; Harold W. Gehman Jr. (born 1942)	September 29, 1999	September 5, 2000	342 days	U.S. Navy
2	William F. Kernan	General; William F. Kernan (1946–2025)	September 5, 2000	October 2, 2002	2 years, 27 days	U.S. Army
3	Edmund P. Giambastiani Jr.	Admiral; Edmund P. Giambastiani Jr. (born 1948)	October 2, 2002	August 1, 2005	2 years, 303 days	U.S. Navy
-	Robert W. Wagner	Lieutenant General; Robert W. Wagner; Acting	August 1, 2005	November 10, 2005	101 days	U.S. Army
4	Lance L. Smith	General; Lance L. Smith (born 1946)	November 10, 2005	November 9, 2007	1 year, 364 days	U.S. Air Force
5	Jim Mattis	General; Jim Mattis (born 1950)	November 9, 2007	September 2010	~4 years, 295 days	U.S. Marine Corps
-	Keith M. Huber	Lieutenant General; Keith M. Huber; Acting	September 2010	October 29, 2010	~58 days	U.S. Army
6	Raymond T. Odierno	General; Raymond T. Odierno (1954–2021)	October 29, 2010	August 31, 2011	306 days	U.S. Army
