= Mark B. Shiflett =

American professor

Mark B. Shiflett is an American professor, a Distinguished Professor at the University of Kansas.

He earned Ph.D. and M.S. degrees in chemical engineering from the University of Delaware, as well as a B.S. degree in chemical engineering from North Carolina State University. Shiflett is a technical fellow with the American Institute of Chemical Engineers and holds 41 U.S. patents. In August 2024, he served as director of the Engineering Research Center-Environmentally Applied Refrigerant Technology Hub at the University of Kansas when the National Science Foundation awarded the project $26 million.
