= Texas A&M AgriLife Research =

Government agency in Texas, USA

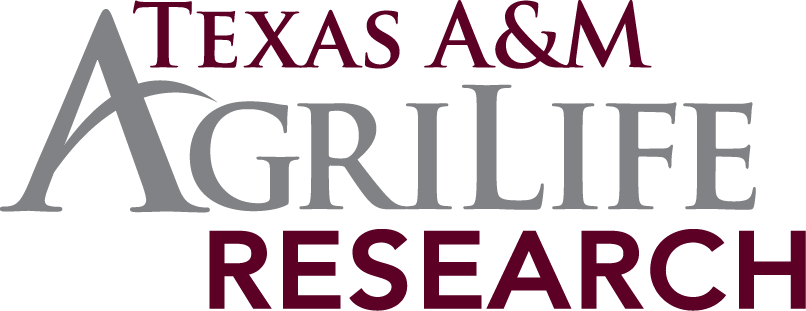
- Texas A&M AgriLife Research logo

Agency overview
- Formed: 1887
- Jurisdiction: Texas
- Headquarters: College Station, Texas, United States
- Employees: 400+ Doctoral-level scientists
- Annual budget: $216.3 million (FY 2017)
- Agency executives: Dr. Cliff Lamb, Director; Stephen Cisneros, Executive Associate Director and Chief Operating Officer; Amir Ibrahim, Associate Director and Chief Scientific Officer
- Parent agency: Texas A&M AgriLife
- Website: http://agriliferesearch.tamu.edu/

Texas A&M AgriLife Research is the agricultural and life sciences research agency of the U.S. state of Texas and a part of the Texas A&M University System. Formerly named Texas Agricultural Research Service, the agency's name was changed January 1, 2008, as part of a rebranding of Texas A&M AgriLife (formerly Texas A&M Agriculture). The A&M was formally added to the agency's name on September 1, 2012, as part of a branding effort by the Texas A&M University System to strengthen the association between the agencies and Texas A&M University.

The agricultural experiment station division is headquartered at Texas A&M's flagship campus in College Station, Texas. Texas A&M AgriLife Research serves all 254 Texas counties and operates 15 research centers throughout the state.

Texas A&M AgriLife Research specialists in beef cattle have produced the world's largest set of gene-mapping resources for beef cattle and have cloned what is believed to be the first animal—a calf—specifically cloned for disease resistance.

== History ==
The history of Texas A&M AgriLife Research began with the founding of the Agricultural and Mechanical College of Texas (Texas A.M.C.) in 1871, the state's first public institute of higher education. Initially, the university did not offer any agricultural classes, leading to protests by farmer groups and much of college's leadership being replaced. Despite the new curriculum in agriculture and engineering, the college's enrollment continued to drop. The land-grant colleges around the country were struggling. With the ample land available in the West, most farmers had little incentive to adopt intensive farming methods and other advanced agricultural technologies. As with Texas A.M.C., the agricultural colleges were being criticized for not actually giving their students the training that would enable them to return to their family farms, and instead the graduates were leaving the farm life altogether. For most observers, however, the biggest issue was that no solid agricultural research on which to base the practical teaching was being attempted, so to fill this need, Congress passed the Hatch Experiment Station Act of 1887, which provided funding for agricultural experiment stations in each state. This led to the founding of the Texas Agricultural Experiment Station in 1887 at Texas A.M.C. This new organization was given the task of conducting research in all aspects of crop and livestock operations.

In 1948, Texas A&M formed the Texas A&M University System, incorporating Texas A&M AgriLife Research and six related agencies which are still part of the system today. In 2007, Elsa Murano, who was overseeing Texas A&M Agriculture as a whole, hired a consulting firm to evaluate the name of Texas Agricultural Experiment Station, as well as other Texas A&M Agriculture organizations. On January 1, 2008, the Experiment Stations' name was changed to Texas AgriLife Research. Murano felt that "AgriLife" better reflected the agency's foundational message that "agriculture is life", while Research better reflected what the organization did. The A&M was formally added to the agency's name on September 1, 2012, as part of a branding effort by the Texas A&M University System to strengthen the association between the agencies and Texas A&M University.

== Research highlights ==
Through its research, the organization helped eradicate Texas fever, a bovine disease spread by ticks that threatened the state's cattle industry. In the 1920s, it conducted the first known studies on the crossbreeding of cattle, which went on to become a national practice still in use by the cattle industry. In 1931, Texas Agricultural Experiment Station developed the first mechanical cotton stripper, a machine that would become widely adopted by cotton farmers within a decade. The organization is a world leader in sorghum research, having begun with its developing the first known sorghum hybrid in 1955. In the 1950s, it also again came to the aid of the cattle industry by developing techniques for destroying screwworms which were plaguing cattle in Texas and Central America.

It also developed the '1015Y' onion, opening the way for Texas to become the leading producer of fresh market onions in America. It helped produce a mild jalapeño pepper ('TAM'), increasing the sales of salsa, and 'BetaSweet' carrots which have higher levels of beta carotene. Its animal researchers helped produce gene mapping resources for cattle, and lead to the cloning of the first calf.

=== Center locations ===
- Amarillo
- Beaumont
- Corpus Christi
- Dallas
- El Paso
- Fort Stockton
- Lubbock
- Overton
- Pecos
- San Angelo
- Stephenville
- Temple
- Uvalde
- Vernon
- Weslaco
