= Texas A&M University College of Agriculture and Life Sciences =

Agricultural school at Texas A&M University

College of Agriculture and Life Sciences
- Type: Public
- Established: 1911; 115 years ago
- Parent institution: Texas A&M University
- Dean: Jeffrey W. Savell
- Students: 6691 (2008)
- Undergraduates: 5425 (2008)
- Location: College Station, Texas, United States; 30.605731°N 96.350695°W
- Website: aglifesciences.tamu.edu

The Texas A&M University College of Agriculture and Life Sciences (AgLifeSciences) is a college of Texas A&M University, a public land-grant research university in College Station, Texas. Agriculture and the Life Sciences have been part of the university since its founding in 1876 as the "Agricultural & Mechanical College of Texas." The college was formally recognized in 1911. A part of the land grant university system, the college offers more than 80 undergrad and grad degree programs across 15 departments. It is also one of the five organizations that comprise Texas A&M AgriLife.

== Academics and enrollment ==
The college employs nearly 400 faculty members across 15 departments, with over 300 of those being full-time faculty. Those departments include: Agricultural Economics; Agricultural Leadership, Education & Communications; Animal Science; Biochemistry/Biophysics; Biological and Agricultural Engineering; Ecosystem Science and Management; Entomology; Horticultural Sciences; Nutrition and Food Sciences; Plant Pathology and Microbiology; Poultry Science; Recreation, Park and Tourism Sciences; Soil and Crop Sciences; and Wildlife and Fisheries Sciences. 31 degrees are available to undergraduate students, with all degrees being Bachelor of Science degrees, except within the horticulture department, which also offers a Bachelor of Arts degree. It offers 45 master's-level degree programs and 27 doctoral-level programs (including 9 interdisciplinary degrees).

In 2008, 6691 students were enrolled in the college, with 5425 of those being undergraduate enrollments. According to the 2008 FAEIS survey released by the USDA, A&M has the largest enrollment among the 234 agricultural colleges and land-grant universities for which USDA receives such data. The college has an 1,800 acre farm with livestock and crops.

== Notable faculty ==
The college faculty has included several professors who have been awarded national and international honors.

=== Active faculty ===
- Fuller Bazer: Humboldt Prize, Wolf Prize in Agriculture

=== Former faculty ===
- Norman Borlaug: 1970 Nobel Peace Prize, National Academy of Sciences in 1968
