= List of college marching bands in the United States =

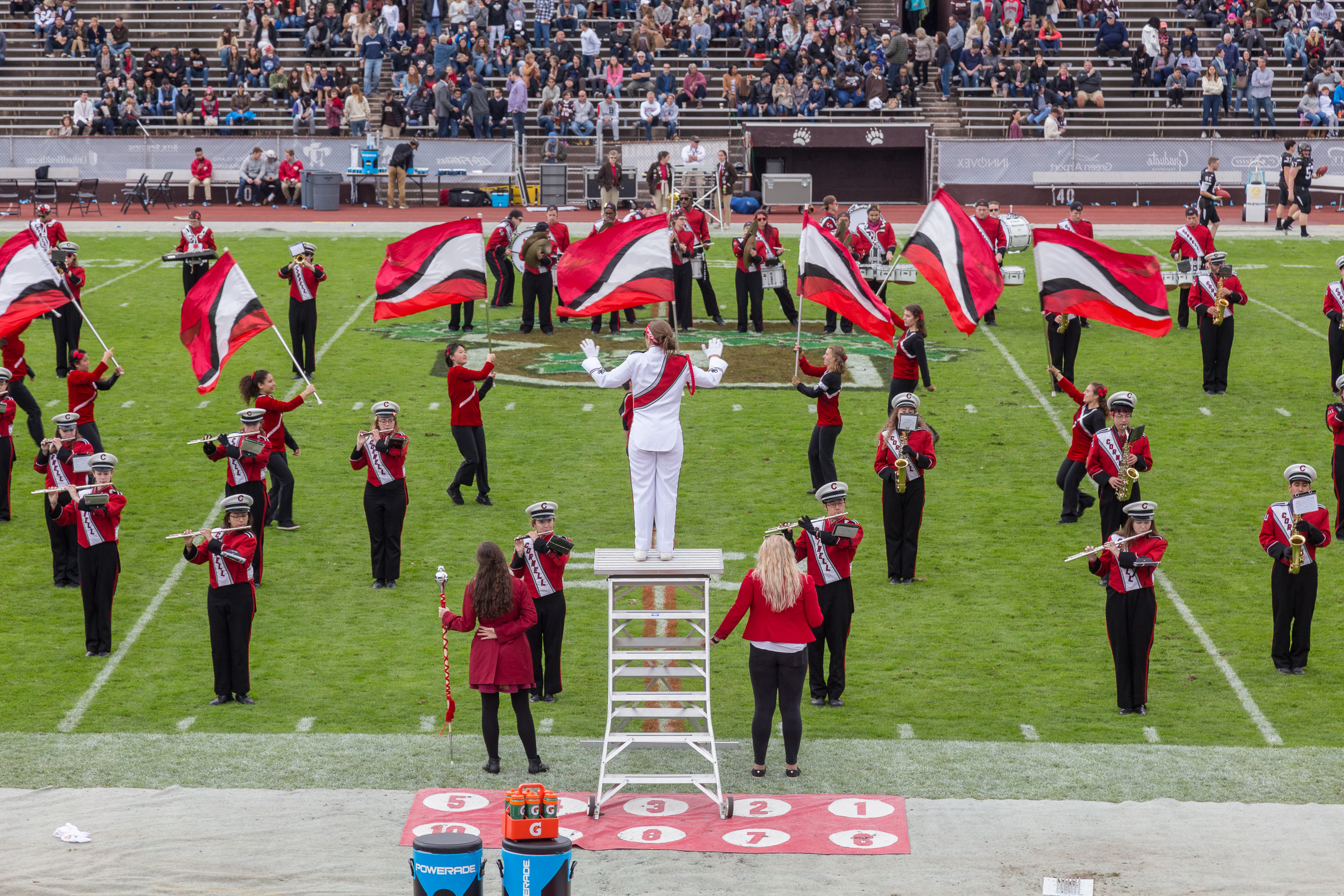
Cornell Big Red Marching Band

College marching bands in the United States are frequently associated with college football and their performance activities often (but don't always) revolve around the sport. In the context of football, marching bands can be seen on the field both at pregame and at halftime, and performing in the stands during the game. College marching bands can also be found performing in parades such as the Macy's Thanksgiving Day Parade and Rose Parade and performing in exhibition at high school marching band competitions such as those run by Bands of America and USBands. There are several styles of marching bands typically found at American colleges and universities.

Schools with prominent football programs in the power 5 conferences typically field traditional, Big Ten-style show bands, whose repertoire largely consists of popular music. They often perform a different half time show at each home game and frequently use a high march style.

Though sharing similarities with other show bands, the marching bands of HBCUs have a style, status, and legacy that differs significantly from bands at other institutions. The bands' repertoires consist largely of Hip Hop and R&B. The reach of HBCU bands extends far beyond the universities they represent and they are renowned for their contributions to black culture. The most famous exhibition of HBCU bands is the Honda Battle of the Bands.

Many Mid-major and FCS schools field corps-style bands drawing inspiration from Drum Corps International. Corps-style bands typically field a single show that is refined and performed throughout the season, These shows often have intricate drill, technical musical passages, and thematic choreography.

Military marching bands at academies and senior military colleges have a more traditional regimental style. They are military units made up either of cadets or full time active duty personnel.

Scramble bands are a type of band often found at selective universities such as those in the Ivy League. Instead of marching set to set, scramble bands often run or "scramble" between sets. Unlike most other marching bands which are led by faculty, scramble bands tend to be student led.

== List ==
Institution	Marching Band	City	St.	Founded	Style	Football Conference
Boston College	Boston College Marching Band	Chestnut Hill	MA	1919	show band	ACC
California	Cal Band^{[r]}^{[s]}	Berkeley	CA	1891	show band	ACC
Clemson	Clemson University Tiger Band^{[w]}	Clemson	SC		show band	ACC
Duke	Duke University Marching Band	Durham	NC	1906	show band	ACC
Georgia Tech	Yellow Jacket Marching Band^{[w]}	Atlanta	GA	1908	show band	ACC
Florida State	Marching Chiefs^{[r]}^{[s]}^{[w]}	Tallahassee	FL	1939	show band	ACC
Louisville	Cardinal Marching Band^{[w]}	Louisville	KY	1928	show band	ACC
University of Miami	Band of the Hour^{[r]}	Miami	FL	1933	show band	ACC
North Carolina	Marching Tar Heels	Chapel Hill	NC	1903	show band	ACC
NC State	Power Sound of the South^{[w]}	Raleigh	NC		show band	ACC
Pittsburgh	Varsity Marching Band	Pittsburgh	PA	1911	show band	ACC
SMU	Mustang Band	Dallas	TX	1917	scramble	ACC
Stanford	Stanford Band^{[r]}	Stanford	CA	1893	scramble	ACC
Syracuse	Syracuse University Marching Band^{[m]}	Syracuse	NY	1901	show band	ACC
Virginia	Cavalier Marching Band^{[m]}^{[w]}	Charlottesville	VA	2003	show band	ACC
Virginia Tech	The Marching Virginians	Blacksburg	VA	1974	show band	ACC
Virginia Tech	Highty-Tighties^{[m]}	Blacksburg	VA	1893	military	ACC
Wake Forest	Spirit of Old Gold and Black	Winston-Salem	NC		show band	ACC
Illinois	Marching Illini^{[m]}^{[r]}	Champaign	IL	1867	show band	Big Ten
Indiana	Marching Hundred^{[r]}	Bloomington	IN	1896	show band	Big Ten
Iowa	Hawkeye Marching Band^{[r]}^{[w]}	Iowa City	IA	1881	show band	Big Ten
Maryland	Mighty Sound of Maryland	College Park	MD	1908	show band	Big Ten
Michigan	Michigan Marching Band^{[r]}^{[s]}	Ann Arbor	MI	1896	show band	Big Ten
Michigan State	Spartan Marching Band^{[r]}	East Lansing	MI	1870	show band	Big Ten
Minnesota	Minnesota Marching Band^{[r]}^{[s]}	Minneapolis	MN	1892	show band	Big Ten
Nebraska	Cornhusker Marching Band^{[r]}	Lincoln	NE	1879	show band	Big Ten
Northwestern	Wildcat Marching Band^{[m]}^{[r]}	Evanston	IL	1911	show band	Big Ten
Ohio State	Ohio State University Marching Band^{[m]}^{[r]}	Columbus	OH	1878	show band	Big Ten
Ohio State	Ohio State University Athletic Band	Columbus	OH	1878	show band	Big Ten
Oregon	Oregon Marching Band^{[r]}^{[w]}	Eugene	OR	1908	show band	Big Ten
Penn State	Penn State Blue Band^{[r]}^{[w]}	University Park	PA	1899	show band	Big Ten
Purdue	"All-American" Marching Band^{[r]}^{[w]}	West Lafayette	IN	1886	show band	Big Ten
Rutgers	Marching Scarlet Knights^{[r]}	New Brunswick	NJ	1915	show band	Big Ten
UCLA	Bruin Marching Band^{[r]}	Los Angeles	CA	1928	show band	Big Ten
Southern California	Trojan Marching Band^{[r]}	Los Angeles	CA		show band	Big Ten
Washington	Husky Marching Band^{[r]}	Seattle	WA	1929	show band	Big Ten
Wisconsin	Badger Band^{[r]}	Madison	WI	1885	show band	Big Ten
Arizona	The Pride of Arizona^{[s]}	Tucson	AZ	1902	show band	Big 12
Arizona State	Sun Devil Marching Band^{[r]}^{[s]}	Tempe	AZ	1915	show band	Big 12
Baylor	Golden Wave Band	Waco	TX	1902	show band	Big 12
BYU	Cougar Marching Band	Provo	UT		show band	Big 12
Cincinnati	Bearcat Marching Band	Cincinnati	OH	1920	show band	Big 12
Colorado	Golden Buffalo Marching Band	Boulder	CO	1908	show band	Big 12
Houston	Spirit of Houston^{[s]}	Houston	TX	1947	show band	Big 12
Iowa State	Cyclone Marching Band	Ames	IA	1880	show band	Big 12
Kansas	Marching Jayhawks	Lawrence	KS	1887	show band	Big 12
Kansas State	The Pride of Wildcat Land	Manhattan	KS	1887	show band	Big 12
Oklahoma State	Cowboy Marching Band	Stillwater	OK	1905	show band	Big 12
TCU	Horned Frog Marching Band^{[r]}	Fort Worth	TX	1904	show band	Big 12
Texas Tech	Goin’ Band from Raiderland	Lubbock	TX	1925	show band	Big 12
UCF	Marching Knights^{[w]}	Orlando	FL	1980	show band	Big 12
Utah	University of Utah Marching Band^{[r]}	Salt Lake City	UT		show band	Big 12
West Virginia	The Pride of West Virginia^{[m]}	Morgantown	WV	1901	show band	Big 12
Boise State	Keith Stein Blue Thunder Marching Band	Boise	ID	1932	show band	Pac-12
Colorado State	Colorado State University Marching Band	Fort Collins	CO	1901	show band	Pac-12
Fresno State	Fresno State Bulldog Marching Band^{[r]}	Fresno	CA	1926	corps-style	Pac-12
Oregon State	Oregon State University Marching Band^{[r]}	Corvallis	OR	1891	show band	Pac-12
San Diego State	San Diego State University Marching Aztecs^{[s]}^{[w]}	San Diego	CA	1946	show band	Pac-12
Texas State	Bobcat Marching Band	San Marcos	TX	1919	show band	Pac-12
Utah State	Aggie Marching Band	Logan	UT	1902	show band	Pac-12
Washington State	Cougar Marching Band^{[r]}^{[w]}	Pullman	WA	1923	show band	Pac-12
Alabama	Million Dollar Band^{[m]}	Tuscaloosa	AL	1912	corps-style	SEC
Arkansas	Razorback Marching Band	Fayetteville	AR	1874	show band	SEC
Auburn	Auburn University Marching Band (AUMB)	Auburn	AL	1897	show band	SEC
Florida	The Pride of the Sunshine^{[s]}	Gainesville	FL	1913	show band	SEC
Georgia	Redcoat Marching Band^{[w]}	Athens	GA	1905	show band	SEC
Kentucky	Wildcat Marching Band	Lexington	KY	1893	show band	SEC
LSU	LSU Tiger Marching Band^{[w]}	Baton Rouge	LA	1893	show band	SEC
Ole Miss	Pride of the South	Oxford	MS		show band	SEC
MS State	Famous Maroon Band	Starkville	MS	1902	show band	SEC
Missouri	Marching Mizzou^{[m]}	Columbia	MO	1885	show band	SEC
Oklahoma	The Pride of Oklahoma^{[r]}	Norman	OK	1904	show band	SEC
South Carolina	Carolina Band	Columbia	SC	1920	show band	SEC
Tennessee	Pride of the Southland Band	Knoxville	TN	1869	show band	SEC
Texas	Longhorn Band^{[r]}^{[s]}	Austin	TX	1900	show band	SEC
Texas A&M	Fighting’ Texas Aggie Band	College Station	TX	1894	military	SEC
Vanderbilt	Spirit of Gold Marching Band	Nashville	TN	1909	show band	SEC
Notre Dame	Band of the Fighting Irish	South Bend	IN	1846	show band	(independent)
UConn	The Pride of Connecticut	Storrs	CT	1896	show band	(independent)
East Carolina	Marching Pirates^{[w]}	Greenville	NC	1934	show band	American
Florida Atlantic	Marching Owls	Boca Raton	FL	2002	corps-style	American
Memphis	Mighty Sound of the South^{[w]}	Memphis	TN			American
Navy	United States Naval Academy Band (unit)	Annapolis	MD	1852	military	American
Navy	USNA Drum and Bugle Corps (midshipmen)	Annapolis	MD	1914	military	American
North Texas	Green Brigade Marching Band	Denton	TX	1932	corps-style	American
Rice	Marching Owl Band (The MOB)	Houston	TX	1916	scramble	American
South Florida	Herd of Thunder^{[w]}	Tampa	FL	1998		American
Temple	Diamond Marching Band	Philadelphia	PA	1925		American
Tulane	Tulane University Marching Band (TUMB)^{[w]}	New Orleans	LA	1920	show band	American
Tulsa	The Sound of the Golden Hurricane	Tulsa	OK			American
UAB	Marching Blazers	Birmingham	AL	1990		American
UNC Charlotte	Pride of Niner Nation Marching Band	Charlotte	NC	2015		American
UTSA	Spirit of San Antonio^{[w]}	San Antonio	TX	2010		American
Army	West Point Band	West Point	NY	1817	military	American
FIU	The Wertheim FIU Marching Band^{[w]}	Miami	FL	2002	corps-style	CUSA
Jacksonville St.	The Marching Southerners^{[w]}	Jacksonville	AL	1956	corps-style	CUSA
Liberty	The Spirit of the Mountain^{[w]}	Lynchburg	VA		corps-style	CUSA
MTSU	Band of Blue	Murfreesboro	TN	1957		CUSA
New Mexico State	Pride of New Mexico Marching Band	Las Cruces	NM			CUSA
Sam Houston St.	Bearcat Marching Band	Huntsville	TX	1911		CUSA
Western Kentucky	Big Red Marching Band	Bowling Green	KY	1925		CUSA
Kennesaw State	Marching Owls	Kennesaw	GA	2014		CUSA
Delaware	Fightin' Blue Hen Marching Band	Newark	DE			CUSA
Missouri State	Pride Marching Band^{[r]}^{[w]}	Springfield	MO			CUSA
Akron	Ohio's Pride	Akron	OH			MAC
Ball State	The Pride of Mid-America	Muncie	IN	1926		MAC
Bowling Green	Falcon Marching Band	Bowling Green	OH	1923	show band	MAC
Buffalo	Thunder of the East^{[f]}	Buffalo	NY	1999		MAC
Central Michigan	Chippewa Marching Band	Mount Pleasant	MI			MAC
Eastern Michigan	Eastern Michigan University Marching Band	Ypsilanti	MI	1924		MAC
Kent State	Marching Golden Flashes	Kent	OH			MAC
Miami University	Miami University Marching Band	Oxford	OH	1935		MAC
Ohio	Marching 110^{[m]}^{[r]}	Athens	OH	1923		MAC
Toledo	Rocket Marching Band	Toledo	OH			MAC
Western Michigan	Bronco Marching Band	Kalamazoo	MI			MAC
UMass Amherst	Minutemen Marching Band^{[m]}^{[r]}	Amherst	MA	1873		MAC
Air Force	United States Air Force Academy Band (unit)	Colorado Springs	CO	1955	military	Mountain West
Air Force	USAFA Drum and Bugle Corps (cadet wing)	Colorado Springs	CO	1948	military	Mountain West
Nevada	Wolf Pack Marching Band^{[w]}	Reno	NV			Mountain West
Hawai'i	Rainbow Warrior Marching Band	Manōa	HI	1923		Mountain West
Northern Illinois	Huskie Marching Band	DeKalb	IL	1899	show band	Mountain West
New Mexico	Spirit Marching Band	Albuquerque	NM			Mountain West
North Dakota St.	Gold Star Marching Band	Fargo	ND	1902		Mountain West
San Jose State	Spartan Marching Band^{[r]}	San Jose	CA			Mountain West
UNLV	Star of Nevada^{[w]}	Las Vegas	NV			Mountain West
UTEP	Marching Miners	El Paso	TX			Mountain West
Wyoming	Western Thunder Marching Band	Lamarie	WY			Mountain West
App State	Marching Mountaineers	Boone	NC	1933	show band	Sun Belt
Arkansas State	Sound of the Natural State	Jonesboro	AR	1909		Sun Belt
Coastal Carolina	Chanticleer Regiment	Conway	SC			Sun Belt
Georgia Southern	Southern Pride Marching Band	Statesboro	GA	1982		Sun Belt
Georgia State	Panther Band^{[m]}^{[r]}^{[w]}	Atlanta	GA			Sun Belt
James Madison	Marching Royal Dukes^{[m]}^{[w]}	Harrisonburg	VA	1972	Corps Style	Sun Belt
Louisiana	Pride of Acadiana^{[s]}^{[w]}	Lafayette	LA			Sun Belt
LA-Monroe	Sound of Today	Monroe	LA			Sun Belt
LA Tech	Band of Pride	Ruston	LA	1906		Sun Belt
Marshall	Marching Thunder	Marshall	WV	1925		Sun Belt
Old Dominion	Monarch Marching Band	Norfolk	VA	2008		Sun Belt
South Alabama	Jaguar Marching Band	Mobile	AL	2009		Sun Belt
Southern Miss	Pride of Mississippi Marching Band	Hattiesburg	MS	1920		Sun Belt
Troy	Sound of the South Marching Band	Troy	AL	1939	show band	Sun Belt
EWU	Eagle Marching Band	Cheney	WA			Big Sky
Idaho	Vandal Marching Band	Moscow	ID	1919		Big Sky
Idaho State	Bengal Marching Band	Pocatello	ID			Big Sky
Montana	Grizzly Marching Band	Missoula	MT			Big Sky
Montana State	Spirit of the West Marching Band	Bozeman	MT			Big Sky
Northern Arizona	Lumberjack Marching Band	Flagstaff	AZ			Big Sky
Northern Colorado	Pride of the Rockies	Greeley	CO		corps-style	Big Sky
Southern Utah	The Sound of Southern Utah	Cedar City	UT			Big Sky
UC Davis	UC Davis Marching Band	Davis	CA	2019		Big Sky
Weber State	Weber State Marching Band^{[w]}	Ogden	UT			Big Sky
Sacramento State	Sacramento State Marching Band^{[w]}	Sacramento	CA	1955		Big West
Albany	Marching Great Danes	Albany	NY			CAA Football
Campbell	The Sound of the Sandhills	Buies Creek	NC			CAA Football
Elon	Fire of the Carolinas Marching Band	Elon	NC	1938		CAA Football
Hampton	The Marching Force^{[m]}	Hampton	VA		HBCU band	CAA Football
Maine	Pride of Maine Black Bear Marching Band	Orono	ME	1896	show band	CAA Football
NC A&T	Blue and Gold Marching Machine	Greensboro	NC	1918	HBCU band	CAA Football
New Hampshire	Wildcat Marching Band^{[w]}	Durham	NH	1919		CAA Football
Rhode Island	URI Ram Marching Band	Kingston	RI			CAA Football
Sacred Heart	SHU Marching Band^{[w]}	Fairfield	PA			CAA Football
Stony Brook	The Spirit of Stony Brook	Stony Brook	NY			CAA Football
Towson	Towson University Marching Band^{[w]}	Towson	MD			CAA Football
Villanova	Villanova Scramble Band	Philadelphia	PA		scramble	CAA Football
William & Mary	William & Mary Pep Band	Williamsburg	VA		scramble	CAA Football
Brown	Brown University Band	Providence	RI	1924	scramble	Ivy League
Columbia U	Columbia University Marching Band	Manhattan	NY	1904	scramble	Ivy League
Cornell	Big Red Marching Band	Ithaca	NY	1886	show band	Ivy League
Dartmouth	Dartmouth College Marching Band	Hanover	NH	1889	scramble	Ivy League
Harvard	Harvard University Band	Cambridge	MA	1919	scramble	Ivy League
UPenn	The University of Pennsylvania Band	Philadelphia	PA	1897	scramble	Ivy League
Princeton	Princeton University Band	Princeton	NJ	1919	scramble	Ivy League
Yale	Yale Precision Marching Band (YPMB)	New Haven	CT	1917	scramble	Ivy League
Del State	The Approaching Storm Marching Band	Dover	DE		HBCU band	MEAC
Howard	"Showtime" Marching Band	Washington	DC		HBCU band	MEAC
Morgan State	Magnificent Marching Machine^{[m]}	Baltimore	MD		HBCU band	MEAC
Norfolk State	Spartan Legion^{[r]}	Norfolk	VA	1975	HBCU band	MEAC
NC Central	Marching Sound Machine^{[r]}	Durham	NC	1938	HBCU band	MEAC
SC State	The Marching 101	Orangeburg	SC	1918	HBCU band	MEAC
Indiana State	Marching Sycamores	Terre Haute	IN	1933	show band	MVFC
Illinois State	Big Red Marching Machine	Normal	IL			MVFC
Murray State	Racer Band	Murray	KY			MVFC
North Dakota	Pride of the North	Grand Forks	ND			MVFC
Northern Iowa	Panther Marching Band^{[w]}	Cedar Falls	IA			MVFC
South Dakota	The Sound of USD	Vermillion	SD			MVFC
South Dakota St.	Pride of the Dakotas^{[r]}	Brookings	SD			MVFC
Southern Illinois	Marching Salukis	Carbondale	IL	1960		MVFC
Western Illinois	Marching Leathernecks	Macomb	IL			MVFC
Youngstown State	YSU Marching Pride	Youngstown	OH			MVFC
CCSU	Blue Devil Marching Band	New Britain	CT			NEC
Merrimack	Merrimack College Marching Band	North Andover	MA	2021		NEC
Robert Morris	Marching Show band	Moon Township	PA			NEC
Wagner	Wagner College Marching Band^{[m]}	Staten Island	NY			NEC
Charleston So.	Pride of the Lowcountry	North Charleston	SC			OVC
Gardner-Webb	Marching Bulldogs	Boiling Springs	NC			OVC
Eastern Illinois	Panther Marching Band	Charleston	IL			OVC
SEMO	SEMO Marching Band	Cape Girardeau	MO			OVC
Tennessee State	Aristocrat of Bands^{[r]}	Nashville	TN		HBCU band	OVC
UT Martin	Aviators Marching Band	Martin	TN			OVC
Holy Cross	Good Time Marching Band	Worcester	MA	1845		Patriot
Lehigh	Marching 97	Bethlehem	PA	1906	show band	Patriot
Butler	Butler University Marching Band	Indianapolis	IN			Pioneer
Dayton	Pride of Dayton Marching Band	Dayton	OH			Pioneer
Drake	Drake University Marching Band	Des Moines	IA			Pioneer
Marist	Marist Band	Poughkeepsie	NY	1979		Pioneer
Morehead State	Marching Band	Morehead	KY			Pioneer
UT Chattanooga	Marching Mocs	Chattanooga	TN	1886		SoCon
The Citadel	The Regimental Band and Pipes	Charleston	SC	1909	military	SoCon
ETSU	Marching Bucs	Johnson City	TN	2017		SoCon
Furman	Paladin Regiment	Greenville	SC	1920	corps-style	SoCon
Mercer	Mercer University Marching Band	Macon	GA			SoCon
Samford	Bulldog Marching Band	Samford	AL			SoCon
Tennessee Tech	Golden Eagle Marching Band	Cookesville	TN			SoCon
VMI	VMI Regimental Band	Lexington	VA	1881	military	SoCon
Western Carolina	Pride of the Mountains Marching Band^{[m]}^{[r]}	Cullowhee	NC	1938	corps-style	SoCon
McNeese State	The Pride of McNeese	Lake Charles	LA			Southland
Nicholls State	Pride of Nicholls^{[s]}	Thibodaux	LA	1972		Southland
Northwestern St.	Spirit of Northwestern	Natchitoches	LA			Southland
SE Louisiana	Spirit of the Southland	Hammond	LA			Southland
Alabama A&M	Marching Maroon & White^{[r]}	Normal	AL		HBCU band	SWAC
Alabama State	Mighty Marching Hornets^{[r]}	Montgomery	AL		HBCU band	SWAC
Bethune–Cookman	Marching Wildcats	Daytona Beach	FL	1930	HBCU band	SWAC
Florida A&M	Marching 100^{[r]}^{[s]}	Tallahassee	FL	1946	HBCU band	SWAC
Jackson State	Sonic Boom of the South	Jackson	MS	1940s	HBCU band	SWAC
Mississippi Valley	Mean Green Marching Machine	Itta Bena	MS		HBCU band	SWAC
Alcorn State	Sounds of Dyn-O-mite	Lorman	MS	1960s	HBCU band	SWAC
UA Pine Bluff	Marching Musical Machine of the Mid-South (M4)	Pine Bluff	AR	2008	HBCU band	SWAC
Grambling State	GSU Tiger Marching Band^{[r]}^{[s]}	Grambling	LA	1926	HBCU band	SWAC
Prairie View A&M	Marching Storm^{[m]}^{[r]}^{[s]}	Prairie View	TX		HBCU band	SWAC
Southern U	Human Jukebox^{[r]}^{[s]}	Baton Rouge	LA	1947	HBCU band	SWAC
Texas Southern	Ocean of Soul^{[s]}	Houston	TX	1969	HBCU band	SWAC
Incarnate Word	Marching Cardinals	San Antonio	TX			Southland
Lamar	Showcase of Southeast Texas	Beaumont	TX			Southland
Stephen F. Austin	Lumberjack Marching Band^{[m]}	Nacogdoches	TX	1926		Southland
Abilene Christian	Big Purple Marching Band	Abiline	TX			UAC
Austin Peay	Governor's Own Marching Band	Clarksville	TN			UAC
Central Arkansas	Bear Marching Band	Conway	AR			UAC
Eastern Kentucky	Marching Colonels	Richmond	KY			UAC
North Alabama	Marching Pride of North Alabama	Florence	AL	1949	corps-style	UAC
Tarleton State	The Sound & The Fury	Stephensville	TX			UAC
Utah Tech	Utah Tech University Marching Band	St. George	UT			UAC
UMass Lowell	UMass Lowell Marching Band	Lowell	MA	1979	corps-style	(non-football)
Minnesota State	The Maverick Machine	Mankato	MN	1929		Division II
Cal Poly Humboldt	Marching Lumberjacks	Arcata	CA	1968	scramble	Division II
Michigan Tech	Huskies Pep Band	Houghton	MI	1928	scramble	Division II
West Chester	Golden Rams Marching Band^{[m]}	West Chester	PA		corps-style	Division II
Benedict College	Marching Tiger Band of Distinction^{[m]}	Columbia	SC	1942	HBCU band	Division II
North Georgia	Golden Eagle Band	Dahlonega	GA	1873	military	Division II
CSU - Pueblo	ThunderWolves Marching Band	Pueblo	CO		show band	Division II
U Chicago	University of Chicago Band	Chicago	IL	1898	scramble	Division III
DePauw	Tiger Pep Band	Greencastle	IN		scramble	Division III
UWEC	Blugold Marching Band	Eau Claire	WI	2000		Division III
The College of Wooster	Scot Marching Band	Wooster	OH		show band	Division III
Gettysburg College	Bullet Marching Band	Gettysburg	PA	1909	corps-style	Division III
Grove City College	Wolverine Marching Band	Grove City	PA		corps-style	Division III
Saint Francis	St. Francis Marching Band	Loretto	PA			Division III
Ohio Northern University	The Star of Northwest Ohio	Ada	OH	1890	show band	Division III
Baldwin Wallace University	Marching Yellow Jackets	Berea	OH	1925	show band	Division III
Christopher Newport University	The Marching Captains	Newport News	VA	2004	show band	Division III
Rowan University	The Pride of the Profs	Glassboro	NJ	2023	show band	Division III
RCC	RCC Marching Tigers^{[m]}^{[r]}	Riverside	CA	1984	corps-style	CCCAA
Cisco College	Wrangler Band^{[m]}	Cisco	TX			NJCAA

== Notes ==
- ^{f} Band was originally founded in 1920 but its current incarnation was founded in 1999
- ^{m} Band has performed at the Macy's Thanksgiving Day Parade
- ^{r} Band has performed at the Tournament of Roses Parade
- ^{s} Band has performed at the Super Bowl
- ^{t} Band has continued activity even after its school's football team was disbanded
- ^{w} Band had their winter guard, indoor drumline, or indoor winds to compete in Winter Guard International
