= List of musical band types =

In music, a musical ensemble or band is a group of musicians that works together to perform music. Some types of musical bands are:

1. All-female band
2. Backup band
3. Boy band
4. Brass Band
5. Brass Band (British)
6. Brass Band (Salvation Army)
7. Christian band
8. Church Worship band
9. Community band
10. Concert band
11. Corps of drums
12. Corps style band
13. Cover band
14. Dansband
15. Drum and bugle corps
16. Fanfare band
17. Fanfare orchestra
18. Fife and drum
19. Garage rock band
20. Girl group
21. Heavy metal band
22. Jam band
23. Jazz band
24. Jug band
25. Klezmer band
26. Marching band
27. Metal band
28. Military band
29. Military band (USA)
30. Orchestra
31. Organ trio
32. Pipe band
33. Police band
34. Punk band
35. Rock band / Pop band
36. Rock Supergroup
37. School band
38. Ska band
39. Studio band
40. Tribute act
