= SSMB =

SSMB may refer to:

- Steady-state microbunching, an advanced accelerator-based synchrotron light source architecture designed to generate high-average-power, continuous-wave extreme ultraviolet light
- Sacramento State Marching Band, American band

== See also ==
- SSMB-Nano, type of electrical connector
