= Duke University Marching Band =

College marching band in Durham, North Carolina

- School: Duke University
- Location: Durham, North Carolina
- Conference: Atlantic Coast Conference
- Founded: 1906
- Director: Jeff Au
- Fight song: "Blue and White" and "Fight! Blue Devils, Fight!"
- Website: http://www.dukeband.org/

The Duke University Marching Band (DUMB) is the marching band of Duke University, located in Durham, North Carolina. The band performs at all Duke Blue Devils football home games, select away games, bowl games, and other events. The band also supports various other sports in the form of a pep band. Band membership consists almost entirely of non-music majors and includes roughly 150 participating students. First founded in 1906, the group is very significant for being one of the oldest marching bands in the Atlantic Coast Conference. In 2012, they produced and released their own album, Gameday Faves: Duke Classics, containing favorite music selections of the band and university.

== History ==
What would become the Duke University Marching Band was founded in 1906 at Trinity College (Trinity College was renamed Duke University in 1924). The history of the band over its first decade and a half remain rather spotty, though an article in the 1914 edition of the Chanticleer, the university's student newspaper at the time, made mentions of a "college military band". In the 1920s, the band switched gears and became an "entertainment jazz band", which performed at football games and other various events. The band dwindled in size during the 1930s, most likely due to the ongoing Great Depression. In 1935, director Robert B. Fearing divided the band into two units: a military unit (the marching band) and a concert unit. The military unit was given uniforms modeled after those used by the West Point Band, and women were granted membership into the band in 1943.

Much of the evolution of the band program at Duke University occurred under the leadership of Paul Bryan who was hired as the new director of bands, who then hired Jim Henry to be the exclusive marching band director nine years later in 1960. Under their tenure, the band also started to play at Blue Devil basketball games and became one of the first modern pep bands in the country. The structure of the pep band remains much the same to this day.

In 1976, the marching band took a much different and nontraditional approach to its field shows as it experimented with becoming a scramble band, much like those found at Stanford University and all but one Ivy League institution. However, the band quickly reverted to a traditional corps-style marching band in 1977. The band continues to grow steadily and size and gain recognition throughout the Atlantic Coast Conference.

=== Directors ===
- 1920–1924: H. L. Blomquist
- 1924–1935: G. E. "Jelly" Leftwich, Jr.
- 1935–1944: Robert B. Fearing
- 1944–1951: Allan H. Bone
- 1951–1960: Paul Bryan
- 1960–1987: Jim Henry
- 1987–2005: Neil Boumpani
- 2005–present: Jeff Au

== Performances ==
At all home football games, the band performs a pre-game show consisting of the Star-Spangled Banner, Dear Old Duke (the university's alma mater), and both of Duke's fight songs, Fight Blue Devils, Fight! and Blue and White. The band performs at several halftime shows during the football season, usually featuring current popular music, occasionally incorporating dance moves into the usual marching. In addition to performing on the field, the band maintains a large repertoire of stands music, which includes both fight songs, Everytime We Touch, and Mortal Kombat, among many others. The band also plays at several away football games each season, and appeared at the 2012 Belk Bowl, 2013 Chick-fil-A Bowl, and the 2014 Sun Bowl.

The band practices 2-3 times per week—on Wednesday and Friday evenings and on Mondays prior to football games.

== Pep Band ==
The band serves as a pep band at all home men's and women's basketball games, adding to the hostile game-time atmosphere of Cameron Indoor Stadium. The band leads the cheers of the Cameron Crazies, Duke's famous basketball student section. Come March, the band travels with both the men's and women's team to all ACC and NCAA tournament games. The pep band also performs at volleyball, field hockey, and soccer matches in the fall. Marching band membership is required to be a member in the pep band.
