= Utah State University Aggie Marching Band =

American university marching band

Utah State University Marching Band
- Origin: Logan, Utah, United States
- Genres: Marching band
- Years active: 1902–present
- Website: artsci.usu.edu/music/ensembles/aggie-marching-band

Utah State University's marching band is known as the Aggie! Marching! Band!. The band consists of approximately 180 members and has three sections: winds, drumline, and colorguard.

== Overview ==
The Aggie Marching Band performs at Utah State Aggies football games during halftime and during breaks in the game from a reserved section in the stands of Maverik Stadium. The band has also performs at concerts hosted by Utah State University.

== Membership and structure ==
All interested Utah State University students are eligible to try out for the marching band. Members of the marching band practice in the Daryl Chase Fine Arts Center and kick off each season with band camp, which band members refer to as "Hell Week," a 12-hour period focused on marching, music, and field movements. Following the initial rigorous week of training, the band practices for about four hours per week through the school year..

== Scholarships and stipends ==
Utah State University may provide modest scholarships to its band members.

== Faculty and leadership ==
Lane Weaver acts as director of the Aggie Marching Band.

== Traditions ==
The Aggie Marching Band is known for performing Utah State University's fight song, Hail the Utah Aggies and the university's anthem The Scotsman at football games. The band uniform consists of white shoes, navy blue pants, jacket, and cap, with the Utah State Block A and text "Utah State" over the A on the back of each jacket.

== Service ==
The marching band is served by the Iota Iota chapter of Kappa Kappa Psi. It was chartered on April 13, 1990 with the help of the Iota Alpha chapter of Fresno State University and the Alpha Nu chapter of the University of Wyoming. The Iota Iota chapter is a part of the Western District.

The Theta Eta chapter of Tau Beta Sigma was chartered on April 13, 1990, but has since gone inactive.

== See also ==
- Utah State Aggies
- List of college marching bands in the United States
