= Paladin Regiment =

Marching band of Furman University

- School: Furman University
- Location: Greenville, South Carolina, USA
- Conference: Southern Conference
- Founded: 1920
- Director: Jay Bocook and Sue Samuels
- Members: 230

The Paladin Regiment is the marching band of Furman University in Greenville, South Carolina. The band performs at all Paladin home football games and usually travels to one away game each year. The band is under the direction of Drum Corps International Hall of Fame arranger Jay Bocook and Furman Director of Bands Dr. Sue Samuels. The Paladin Regiment is open to all Furman students and students from Greenville Technical College.

The band has performed before audiences at professional football games and Disney World shows. The band has also performed at numerous regional exhibitions, including state marching championships. The Paladin Regiment is composed of woodwinds, brass, percussion, color guard, twirlers, and a dance troupe.

The band started in 1920. Dan Ellis became its director in 1958. In his first year, the marching band fielded about 40 members. By 1972, Ellis had built the band up to 120 members. Ellis also started the annual Furman University Marching Band Competition in 1968. From 1980 to 1986, this high school band contest was one of eight regional Tropicana Music Bowl events, with the winners invited to perform in the Orange Bowl Parade. The Music Bowl proceeds benefited the Greenville Shriners Hospital for Children, and the annual contest served as a recruitment tool for the Furman band program.

Jay Bocook served as Director of Bands from 1982 to 1989. During his tenure, the band adopted corps-style marching and recorded marching band music for promotional albums by Jenson Publications, where Bocook was an arranger, between 1983 and 1988. The band grew to a peak of 193 members in 1983 and was the subject of an article in Southern Living in 1984.

After Bocook's departure, John C. Carmichael served as Director of Bands from 1989 to 1993, followed by Dr. Leslie W. Hicken from 1993 to 2019. During Hicken's tenure, the marching band was renamed the Paladin Regiment in 1995, and Jay Bocook returned in 2000 in the newly formed position of Director of Athletic Bands. The band continued to embrace corps-style marching, expanded its front ensemble (pit) substantially, and added dance breaks, electric guitars, and electronic enhancements.
