= Fresno State Bulldog Marching Band =

College marching band in Fresno, California

- School: Fresno State University
- Location: Fresno, California, U.S.
- Conference: Pac-12 Conference
- Founded: 1926; 100 years ago
- Director: Steve McKeithen
- Members: 200
- Fight song: "Fight Varsity!"
- Motto: The Best Band in the West
- Website: www.fresnostatebands.com

The Fresno State Bulldog Marching Band (or BMB) is the marching band of Fresno State University. With over 200 members, the Bulldog Marching Band performs in support of Fresno State Bulldogs football at Valley Children's Stadium.

Unlike most the more common "show band" style of marching band found in the college football landscape, the BMB follows a corps style approach. The band utilizes a front ensemble and programs fewer shows per football season, with greater emphasis on theatrical staging and drill formations. This also makes the Bulldog Marching Band the only corps style band in the Pac-12 Conference.

In 1992, the Bulldog Marching Band was affected by institutional budget cuts. It was inactive for one year and returned in 1993 with the hiring of Gary P. Gilroy.

== Directors ==
Directors of the Bulldog Marching Band
| Director | Years | Length of Direction |
|---|---|---|
| Arthur C. Forsblad | 1926-1949 | 23 years |
| Elwyn Shwartz | 1950-1952 | 3 years |
| Russel Howland | 1953-1955 | 3 years |
| Ralph Rea | 1956 | 1 year |
| Dean Killon | 1957-1959 | 3 years |
| Arthur Barnes | 1960-1963 | 4 years |
| John H. Martin | 1964-1967 | 4 years |
| Lawrence R. Sutherland | 1968-1979 | 11 years |
| Frank Bibb | 1980-1983 | 4 years |
| M. Scott McBride | 1984-1990 | 7 years |
| Bill Barbour | 1991 | 1 year |
| Gary P. Gilroy | 1993-2002 | 10 years |
| David Gabrielson (interim) | 2003-2005 | 3 years |
| Timothy T. Anderson (interim) | 2006 | 1 year |
| Timothy T. Anderson | 2007-2010 | 4 years |
| Adam Wilke (interim) | 2011 | 1 year |
| David Fullmer | 2012 | 1 year |
| Gary P. Gilroy | 2013 | 1 year |
| Steve McKeithen | 2014- | |

== Band Composition ==
=== Instrumentation ===
==== Winds ====
- Piccolo
- Clarinet
- Alto Saxophone
- Tenor Saxophone
- Trumpet
- Mellophone
- Trombone
- Baritone
- Sousaphone

==== Percussion ====
- Snare drum
- Tenor drums
- Bass drum
- Cymbals
- Front ensemble
  - Marimba
  - Vibraphone
  - Drumset
  - Bass guitar
  - Keyboard
  - Rack

=== Auxiliaries ===
- Color Guard

== Repertoire ==
=== "Fight Varsity!" ===
"Fight Varsity!" is the fight song of the university. It was adopted in 1934, written by written by Chet Enos and Cuyler H. Leonard. It was arranged for the BMB by John Bliss.

=== "To Thee Our Alma Mater" ===
"To Thee Our Alma Mater" is the alma mater of the university. It was written in 1925 by Charles Dana Gibson and James H. Morrison. It was arranged by Anna Hamre for the BMB.

== Travel ==
The Bulldog Marching Band travels to select away games and postseason games. Some recent appearances in the last ten years include:

- 2016 Fresno State vs. Nevada game
- 2016 Oakland Raiders game
- 2017 Mountain West Conference Football Championship Game at Boise State
- 2017 Hawaii Bowl
- 2018 Fresno State vs. UCLA game
- 2018 Mountain West Conference Football Championship Game at Boise State
- 2018 Mitsubishi Las Vegas Bowl
- 2019 Fresno State vs. USC game
- 2021 New Mexico Bowl
- 2022 Fresno State vs. USC game
- 2023 Rose Parade
- 2023 St. Patrick's Day Parade in Dublin
- 2024 Rose Parade
- 2024 Famous Idaho Potato Bowl
- 2025 Snoop Dogg Arizona Bowl

== Sierra Cup Classic ==
The Sierra Cup Classic is a marching band competition hosted by the Bulldog Marching Band. It was founded in 1997 by current Fresno State Director of Bands, Gary P. Gilroy. The BMB performs one show from that year's slate in exhibition.

== Service ==
The Bulldog Marching Band is supported by the Iota Alpha chapter of Kappa Kappa Psi, and the Eta Omega chapter of Tau Beta Sigma. They were both chartered on April 30, 1988 and are a part of the Western District. Both chapters were advised by the Eta Mu and Zeta Xi chapters at San Diego State University.
