= Colorado State University Marching Band =

College marching band in Fort Collins, Colorado

- School: Colorado State University
- Location: Fort Collins, Colorado, U.S.
- Conference: Pac-12 Conference
- Founded: 1901; 125 years ago
- Director: Jayme Taylor
- Members: 230
- Fight song: "Stalwart Rams"
- Motto: Bring The Boom
- Website: music.colostate.edu/bands/marching-band/

The Colorado State University Marching Band (or CSUMB) is the marching band of Colorado State University. With approximately 230 members, the CSUMB performs at all home football games in support of Colorado State Rams football.

The marching band is one of the oldest organizations on campus, founded in 1901 with only 13 members. Aside of their home football games, the CSUMB travels to a select number of away games, high school competitions, the Parade of Lights, and Denver Broncos games.

== Band composition ==
=== Instrumentation ===
- Piccolo
- Clarinet
- Alto Saxophone
- Tenor Saxophone
- Trumpet
- Mellophone
- Trombone
- Baritone
- Sousaphone
- Snare drums
- Tenor drums
- Bass drums
- Cymbals

=== Auxiliaries ===
- Color Guard
- Dance Team

== Repertoire ==
=== "Stalwart Rams" ===
"Stalwart Rams" is the fight song of the university. It was composed in 1932 by Richard F. Bourne, the band director and veterinary medicine professor at the time. It premiered at a football game against the University of Utah on November 19, 1932. The song replaced an older fight song set to the tune of "On, Wisconsin!" ("Come on Aggies").

=== The alma mater ===
The alma mater of the university is set to the tune of "Annie Lisle" by H.S. Thompson. It is likely spun off from "Far Above Cayuga's Waters", Cornell University's alma mater, a practice done by dozens of other universities.

== Travel ==
The CSUMB travels with the football team to bowl games, with their most recent trip being the 2025 Snoop Dog Arizona Bowl. The band, in pep band form, also travels with the men and women's basketball teams to conference tournaments and postseason games.

The band will be going on a London tour in the spring of 2027 with performances planned for Cardiff Castle, a Premiere League football match, and more.

== Service ==
The marching band is supported by the Kappa chapter of Kappa Kappa Psi. It was chartered on May 31, 1924, but went inactive in the late 1960s. It was rechartered on April 23, 2023. It is a part of the Midwest District. It operates primarily to provide service, leadership opportunities, and social programming to the band programs at Colorado State University.

There was an Alpha Phi chapter of Tau Beta Sigma, chartered on April 3, 1954, but it has gone inactive.

== Venues ==
The CSUMB has performed in various locales in support of the football team, including:

- Durkee Field (1899-1911)
- Colorado Field (1912–1967)
- Sonny Lubick Field at Hughes Stadium (1968–2016)
- Canvas Stadium (2017-present)
