= Miami University Marching Band =

College marching band in Oxford, Ohio

- School: Miami University
- Location: Oxford, Ohio
- Conference: MAC
- Founded: 1935
- Director: Dr. Ryan Yahl
- Members: 220
- Fight song: "Miami March Song"
- Website: http://music.miamioh.edu/mumb/

The Miami University Marching Band (MUMB) is the marching band of Miami University in Oxford, Ohio. Founded in 1935, the band is an organization which fields 220 students enrolled in the Miami University system. The band is a part of the College of Creative Arts and the Department of Music, representing the students of the college at all home football games, as well as at various away games, bowl games, parades, and marching band festivals.

== History ==
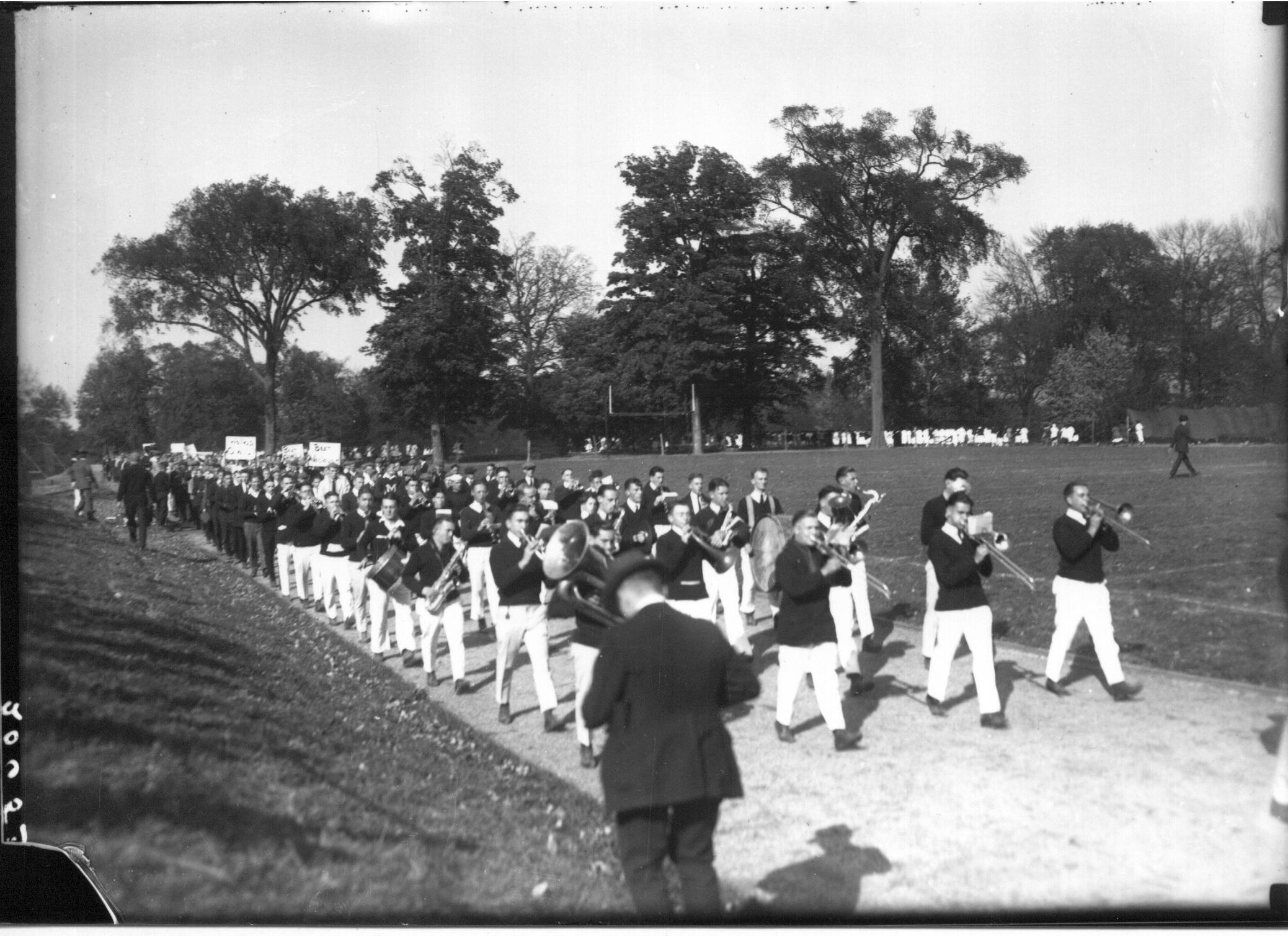
The band, then part of the Men's Glee Club, marching to the 1921 Miami–Ohio Wesleyan football game

The Miami University Marching Band was established in 1935 under the leadership of A.D. Lekvold, who served as director of bands from 1936 to 1960. Early uniforms featured white trousers, red capes, and red coats. By the 1950s, the band had grown to 96 members and regularly traveled to perform at Bowling Green State University, Ohio University, and the University of Cincinnati. Additionally, around this time the Shakerettes, drill team, and majorettes first appeared.

Under the direction of Nicholas Poccia in the 1960s and 1970s, membership increased from 96 to 144, with over 200 individuals participating as either field marchers or alternates. In the late 1960s, new blue uniforms were introduced, featuring a large "M" on the front and an Indian emblem on the back. In 1971, the "Miami Marching Machine", a tank-like structure built by Kappa Kappa Psi and Tau Beta Sigma as a birthday gift for Poccia, was introduced to performances. Mounted on a Volkswagen, it served as the band's mascot, making appearances in parades and a Cincinnati Bengals game until its retirement in 1979.

Jack Liles became director in 1978, introducing the modern drum corps style of marching in place of the previous dance style. He also added a color guard and front pit ensemble, aligning MUMB with national trends. The 1980s brought significant growth in both size and performance quality. In 1999, David Shaffer took over as director, leading the band in major performances including the 2003 Macy's Thanksgiving Day Parade and two bowl games. His successor, Stephen Lytle, expanded the band’s visibility through high-profile appearances, including performances with jazz icon Benny Golson, the 2011 Macy's Parade, the parade at the second inauguration of Barack Obama, and several NCAA and bowl game events. In 2018, Brooke Johnson was appointed director, and the band performed at the 2019 Bands of America championships. Ryan Yahl was made director in 2023, and in 2024 the MUMB performed with Snoop Dogg and the Colorado State University marching band at the 2024 Arizona Bowl.

== Instrumentation ==
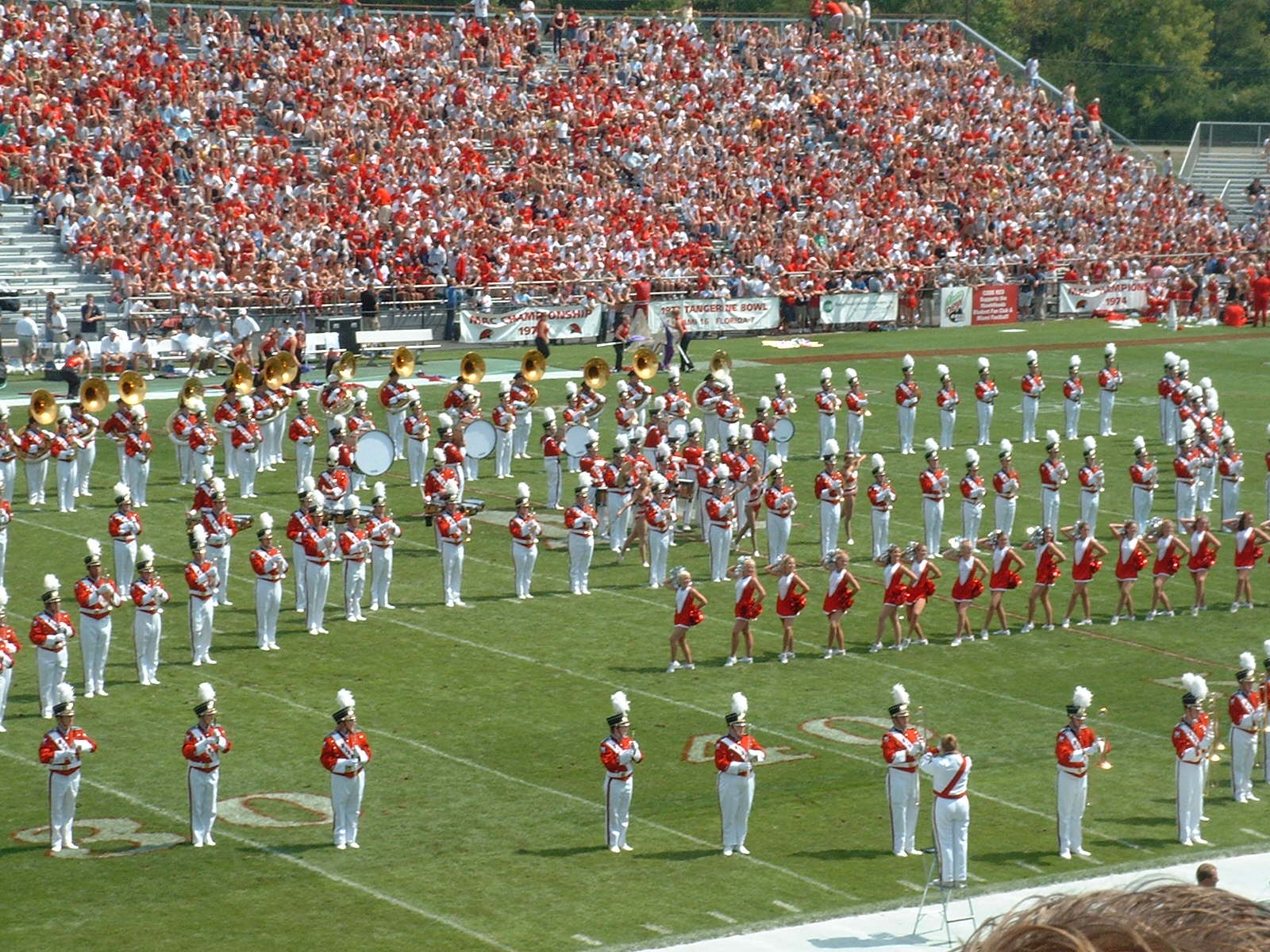
The Miami University Marching Band performing a halftime show on September 7, 2002, at Yager Stadium in Oxford.

The Miami University Marching Band consists of about 270 members, featuring brass, woodwinds, battery, and a pit percussion section. Baton twirlers, a color guard, and a dance team (called the Shakerettes) also perform with the band.

=== Directors ===
- A.D. Lekvold, 1935–1960
- Nicholas Poccia, 1960–1978
- Dr. Jack Liles, 1978–1999
- David Shaffer, 1999–2009
- Dr. Stephen Lytle, 2009–2018
- Dr. Brooke Johnson, 2018–2023
- Dr. Ryan Yahl, 2023–present

== Notable performances ==
Every other year, the band travels with the football team to the rival Cincinnati Bearcats to play for the Victory Bell. Additionally, since 1985, MUMB has performed in the following bowl games: the 1986 California Bowl, 2003 GMAC Bowl, the 2004 Independence Bowl, the 2010 MAC Championship Game, the 2010 GoDaddy.com Bowl, the 2016 St. Petersburg Bowl, the 2020 LendingTree Bowl, and most recently the 2021 Frisco Football Classic.

In 2003, the band traveled to New York City to perform in the Macy's Thanksgiving Day Parade, and returned again in 2011. The MUMB also marched in the 2013 Presidential Inaugural Parade on behalf of Ohio, and is a perennial feature in the Indianapolis Bands of America Grand Nationals.
