= The Sound of the Golden Hurricane Marching Band =

Marching band of the University of Tulsa, Oklahoma, US

Sound of the Golden Hurricane
- School: University of Tulsa
- Location: Tulsa, Oklahoma
- Conference: American Athletic Conference
- Director: Matthew Schepers
- Members: 121
- Fight song: "Hurricane Spirit"
- Website: https://artsandsciences.utulsa.edu/academics/departments-schools/music/the-sound-of-the-golden-hurricane-marching-band/

The Sound of the Golden Hurricane is the school marching band for the University of Tulsa, based in Tulsa, Oklahoma. The band is led by Matthew Schepers, Director of Athletic Bands, with Chris Harris serving as the percussion instructor. The color guard is under the instruction of Ms. Sydney Johnston. "The Sound" specializes in performing a variety of music geared to crowd entertainment, and performs in a multitude of styles during TU athletic events. The band performs a different halftime show for almost every home game throughout each football season, and introduced a new pre-game routine in 2013. The Sound debuted new uniforms during the 2016 season, featuring the first new uniform design for the group since the early 1990s.

The band performs at every home game for the Golden Hurricane football team in Chapman Stadium, as well as selected away games and bowl appearances. The band also performs at many men's and women's basketball games at the University of Tulsa's Reynolds Center. The band has appeared on several Tulsa news stations and ESPN broadcasts of TU football games. The band has performed at several bowl games, including the Independence Bowl, GMAC Bowl, Harvest Bowl, Liberty Bowl, Miami Beach Bowl, and the Armed Forces Bowl.

The Sound of the Golden Hurricane is officially considered a part of the TU curriculum: students may earn academic credit for marching in the band, though this is not mandatory for participation. The band boasts a very high rate of undergraduate participation; 3.5% of the total undergraduate student population are members of the band, a rate only eclipsed at the FBS collegiate level by the Band of the Fighting Irish from the University of Notre Dame.
