= Pride of Acadiana =

Marching band of the University of Louisiana at Lafayette

The Pride of Acadiana
- School: University of Louisiana at Lafayette
- Location: Lafayette, Louisiana
- Conference: Sun Belt Conference
- Director: Shaun Popp
- Members: 278 in 2023
- Website: www.ulbands.com

The Pride of Acadiana is the marching band at the University of Louisiana. The band plays pregame and halftime shows for all home games of the Louisiana Ragin' Cajuns football team.

== History ==
The band has given the Ragin' Cajuns an unofficial second fight song, Respect, as made famous by Aretha Franklin, by playing the song at every football game since the early 1970s.

The band performed at Governor Kathleen Blanco's inauguration in 2004. It also traveled to New York, New York to perform in the Macy's Thanksgiving Day Parade in 2005. During spring break in 2009, the band traveled to the United Kingdom to perform. They held performances at Princes Street Gardens in Edinburgh, Scotland, and at Victoria Embankment Gardens in the City of Westminster in London, England and recently in 2010 performed in Madrid, Spain as part of the annual Three King's Parade and was the first American marching band to appear on national Spanish television. The Pride has recently been invited to return to the Macy's Thanksgiving Day Parade in 2012 to represent the Cajuns once again making them only a handful of college marching bands to ever be invited back.

== Pregame ==
The Pride of Acadiana performs a pregame show before the games. The band will start behind the student section of Cajun Field, marching around three sides of the stadium until it gets to the main entrance. There it will perform a pep rally with the help of the cheerleaders. It will then start playing "Do What Ya Wanna" as it turns and heads into the stadium. The band then files out and down into the tunnel, where the members line up for the pregame field show. For 2013, the band begins pregame by peak stepping out of the tunnel and onto the field at a quick tempo to a drum cadence. Then, they perform short snippets of Aretha Franklin's "Respect" (the Respect Fanfare) before marching down the field to the Louisiana Fight Song, eventually forming a large "UL." The band then performs the Alma Mater and the Star Spangled Banner. Afterwards, the band performs the songs "Jambalaya" and "You Are My Sunshine" forming a large fleur de lis, as the world's largest Louisiana flag is displayed. Then, after forming a "tunnel," the band plays the Louisiana Fight Song once again as the team enters the field. Afterwards, the band plays "Respect off the field", where they play "Respect" while marching to the away side of the field and gathering by the band's section in the stands.

== Halftime ==
The Pride of Acadiana usually prepares multiple marching shows for each football season, which they will alternate between games. For these shows, the band will file down to the field and get in position to start the show before the half. The band performs to the home side, although occasionally it will turn and perform a couple of songs to the student side. After the performance, the band plays "Respect" off the field and returns to their seats.

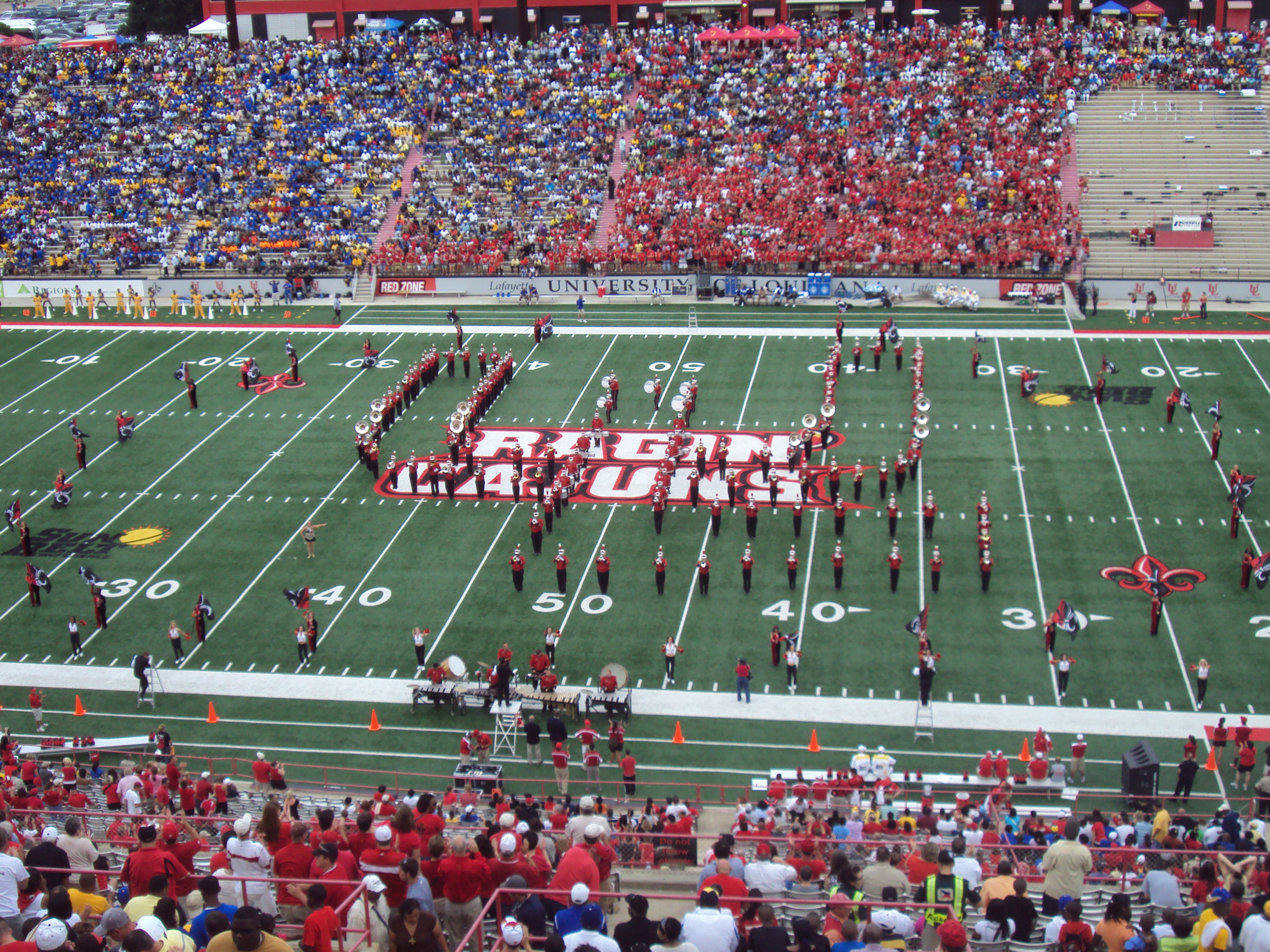
A view of the Pride of Acadiana marching band playing the fight song in the Louisiana Ragin Cajuns set during pregame at Cajun Field.

== Exhibitions ==
The University marching band is the host of the annual Louisiana Showcase of Marching Bands, which brings bands from more than 30 high schools from around the state to compete at one festival. The Pride of Acadiana ends the festival with an exhibition performance of the year's shows.

The band also hosts Drums Across Cajun Field, an annual DCI exhibition that takes place before school starts, usually in July.
