= Temple University Diamond Marching Band =

College marching band in Philadelphia

The Temple University Diamond Marching Band
- School: Temple University
- Location: Philadelphia, PA
- Conference: American Conference
- Founded: 1925
- Director: Matthew Brunner
- Members: 175+
- Fight song: "Fight, Temple, Fight!"
- Motto: "The Pride of the Cherry & White"

Uniform
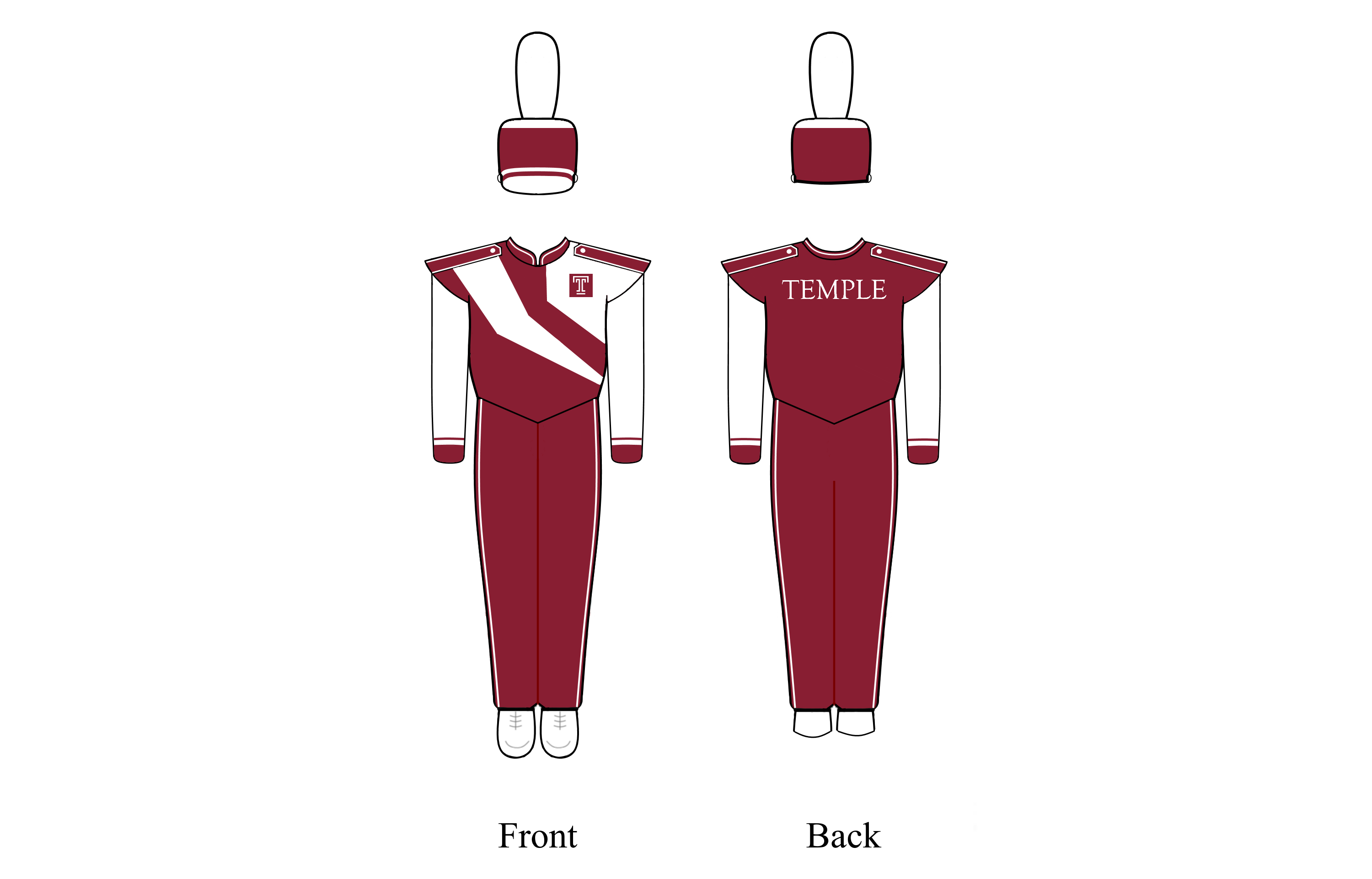
- Website: boyer.temple.edu/about/templebands

The Temple University Diamond Marching Band (TUDMB), sometimes simply the Diamond Band is the official marching band of Temple University. It performs at all home Temple Owls football games and select away games. Other ensembles come from the main band, performing at many events during the Fall semester as well as performing at Temple Owls men's basketball and Temple Owls women's basketball games during the Spring semester. The Diamond Band performed in the 2025 Macy's Thanksgiving Day Parade, coinciding with the band's 100th anniversary.

== History ==
The Temple University Diamond Marching Band was started in 1925 by Herbert E. McMahan, under the direction of Charles Golder. George Otto Frey assumed the director position in 1926 and H. Edward Pike became the band's first full-time director the following year. Under Pike's direction, the band started forming the Temple "T" on the field, a tradition that is still present today. In 1935, the band performed at the first Sugar Bowl. Under the direction of Dr. John H. Jenny, who replaced Pike in 1946, the band was renamed the Diamond Band. A new position, Director of Athletic Bands, was created to oversee the Diamond Marching Band and Basketball Bands. The position is currently held by Dr. Matthew Brunner alongside the Director of Bands, Dr. Patricia Cornett.

== In popular culture ==
The Temple University Diamond Marching Band has appeared in many films over the years, most famously their part in The Wolf of Wall Street (2013 film). The Diamond Band also appears in Annie (2014 film) and on the Tonight Show alongside American rappers Yung Thug and Gunna. The band also marched in the 2025 Macy's Thanksgiving Day parade.

== Uniform ==
The Diamond Band Uniform consists of cherry red bibbers with a white stripe, a cherry and white coat with the Temple University T on the chest, a shako style hat, and white shoes. The Diamond Band jacket has "TEMPLE" across the back.

== Instrumentation ==
- Baton Twirlers
- Color guard
- Flutes and Piccolo
- Clarinets
- Trumpets
- Mellophones
- Alto Saxophones
- Tenor Saxophones
- Trombones
- Baritones
- Drumline
- Sousaphone
