= Bulldog Marching Band =

Marching band of Samford University

- School: Samford University
- Location: Homewood, Alabama, USA
- Conference: Southern Conference
- Director: Ryan Lovell
- Members: 160

The Bulldog Marching Band is the marching band for Samford University located in Homewood, Alabama. The band supports all Bulldogs athletic teams and performs at all football home games. Students from all academic disciplines can participate in the band.
