= Dear Old Duke =

The Duke University Alma Mater, also known as Dear Old Duke, is the official alma mater of Duke University in Durham, North Carolina.

== History ==
The Duke alma mater was written by R. H. James, Class of '24. The alma mater is played every Friday on the Carillon at Duke Chapel, during official events of the university such as convocation and commencement, and at the end of nearly all sporting events where a band is present.

== Lyrics ==
The lyrics are as follows:

Dear old Duke thy name we’ll sing.
To thee our voices raise (we’ll raise),

To thee our anthems ring,
in everlasting praise.

And though on life’s broad‒sea,
Our fates may far us bear.

We’ll ever turn to thee,
Our Alma Mater dear.
