= Bearkat Marching Band =

Marching band at Sam Houston State University

- School: Sam Houston State University
- Location: Huntsville, Texas
- Conference: C-USA
- Founded: 1910
- Director: Darla McBryde
- Members: 250

The Bearkat Marching Band, also known as The Famous Bearkat Band or the BMB, is the marching band at Sam Houston State University. The band was founded in 1910 under the direction of C.W. Feuge, and is currently directed by Darla McBryde. The band appears at Sam Houston football and basketball home games, as well as at pep rallies, the annual Battle of the Piney Woods in Houston, and occasionally at in-state away games.

== History ==
=== Early history (1910–19) ===
The Sam Houston State Bearkat Marching Band has a record dating back to 1910. This unofficial university band consisted of just seven members, who were all males from multiple backgrounds, which included students, faculty, and Huntsville residents. Band director C. W. Feuge, a German instructor at the university, was approached by Henry C. Pritchett, president of the university, to start a brass band.

After 7 years, the Sam Houston Band was officially organized in 1917. Before being made official, the band was open to anyone who had an instrument and was willing to participate, and more importantly, they were ineligible for any state funds. The new university president, Harry Estill, and Earl Huffor, the new band director and faculty manager, proved to the state legislature that states funds were needed to support the program. As a result, the marching band received six hundred dollars, which they used to purchase instruments and other supplies for the band. The first concert was performed in November 1917, and was considered successful enough to establish Huffor as the permanent band director until 1919. Following the spring semester of 1919 a new band director, W.R. Faifer, was appointed. Faifer had previously conducted a fifty-piece orchestra in Nacogdoches, Texas. Early meetings of the band were focused on music instruction until Faifer felt they were ready for public performance.

=== Band development (1920–40) ===
Over the next twenty years the band was directed under four different men: Faifer through the spring of 1920; W. R. Ford (1920–21); Erwin G. Ernst (1922–28); N. J. Whitehurst (1928-37); and C. R. Hackney (1937–40). The band's most successful years came in 1923–24. They performed at all home basketball games; all pep rallies, assemblies, and a memorial ceremony for Sam Houston at the Huntsville Community Fair on Armistice Day. In a program created by former Sam Houston alumni, the marching band performed in Fort Worth, Texas for a radio appearance. Following the performance, the band received complimentary letters from thirteen different states and Canada. The band made a return trip to Fort Worth the following semester to perform at the State Teachers Convention. At the basketball games, according to the campus newspaper, The Houstonian, they "made the gym vibrate and helped put fight into the team and spirit into the student body".

In 1926, the band expanded to twenty-five members, which included both students and Huntsville residents. During that fall, the band made their first football appearance at the game against Abilene Christian, following which they were urged by The Houstonian to continue to appear at games. Through the next several years the band saw growth and made appearances not only at Sam Houston events, but at off-campus events as well, including county fairs and other community activities. Starting with the 1929–30 school year, the Bearkat Band played at all home football and basketball games. This was also the first year the band elected officers. By 1933, the band size had increased to thirty members. In 1937 Hackney was appointed as the new band director. President Shaver granted three thousand dollars to the band to purchase new instruments and new uniforms, and ordered all existing uniforms to be burned and all instruments scrapped. Beginning in the fall of 1939, the Sam Houston State School of Music was created, and with the increased enrollment for music the band saw a 100 percent increase in membership, bringing their total membership to eighty-four.

=== Growth from 1940 to 1962 ===
The fall of 1940 saw the membership rise to 110 members. Later that semester, the band performed in front of the Governor and State Legislature in Austin, Texas, giving a tribute to all state teacher colleges by playing their fight songs or alma maters. Starting with the 1941 football season, the band began regular halftime shows and performed at eight of ten games. 1942 saw lowered numbers regarding band size. The year started with sixty-five members, much lower when compared to the 110 members in the band just two years prior. By the end of the spring semester, only twenty-five members remained. The next year, Sam Houston's enrollment dwindled due to World War II to the point where there was no football team to perform for. At war's end, the band slowly began to increase in numbers, reaching eighty-five members by the 1949 school year.

In 1953, a sorority for female band members was created, the Progressive Band Women's Association, and was open to any girl in the band maintaining a C average. The sorority later affiliated with a national group, becoming the Alpha Omicron chapter of Tau Beta Sigma.

In 1954 the football team accepted an invitation to play in the Refrigerator Bowl in Indiana. No funds were available for the band to travel to the game, so the band members ran fundraisers and performed odd jobs to raise the funds while dressed as "hobos". The twenty-five hundred dollar goal was met. The Famous Bearkat Band name was used to describe and introduce the band as early as 1950, and by 1956 the name became a regular part of the band's introduction for football games.

By 1960, the band had increased to over one hundred forty, resulting in the number of shows featuring the band increasing. For the first time in twenty-five years, the Christmas concert was performed in 1960. In the spring, the band performed at the first Texas Music Educators Association convention in Dallas, Texas. The 1961–62 school year saw the creation of an endowment fund for scholarships. Two awards of two-hundred and fifty dollars were offered in memory of Inez Powell. Band members auditioned for these scholarships at the end of the two semesters. In the spring of 1962, the band performed at the Sam Houston Ex-Students banquet at the Texas State Teachers Association Convention, and the Wind Ensemble performed in Bryan, Texas on KBTX-TV.

=== Recent history ===
Former band director Elliot T. Bowers later went on to become university president, and the football stadium is named in his honor. The band's peak was in 1974 when the symphonic band performed for the American Band Association and Japanese Band Association's joint convention held in Hawaii. The band was chosen from a national competition to choose which collegiate band would perform

During Sam Houston's 2011 National Championship run, many of the Bearkat band members were unable to perform due to the playoffs being held after the semester was over. To replace the missing members, former Bearkat Marching Band alumni were asked to perform during the FCS Semifinal game. This was the first ever Alumni Bearkat Marching Band.

== On-field performances ==
In the early 1940s one popular halftime show was an American military tribute known as the "bomber formation", which included a blackout of the stadium, sirens, motors and fireworks to replicate a "bombing". As the performance closed, the band exited to "God Bless America. Today, the Bearkat Marching Band performs several different halftime shows throughout the football season. These shows include contemporary music and have specific themes. Some themes in recent years include a superhero show and a Blues Brothers show.

== Traditions ==
Throughout its 100-year history, the band developed many traditions. These include the March to Bowers, and the performance of the Alma Mater from the stands in front of the entire football team. The March to Bowers began during the 2010 season. The band walks from the library on campus to Bearkat Alley at Bowers Stadium playing melodies. They are followed by the Orange Pride dance team and Sam Houston State cheerleaders. A ten-minute mini-pep rally precedes the March.

Sam Houston State has many in-game traditions, most of which were started in the last decade, such as when both teams' bands are present, the Bearkat Marching Band drum line learns the other band's drum cadences and plays them back. Beginning with the 2011 football team's undefeated regular season, the Bearkat Marching Band plays DJ Khaled's hit song, All I Do Is Win after victories. Before the football team leaves the field, the band plays the SHSU alma mater in front of the entire football team. During the song, the fans, along with the football team, raise his or her right hand up over their head and curls the fingers down to form a paw. The football team sings the lyrics to the alma mater.

== Accolades ==
In 1953, the National Bandmasters Association named The Bearkat Marching Band one of the Top Ten College Bands in the nation. Texas Governor Allen Shivers declared the band the official unit for the state on April 21 in the same year.

== Sources ==
- Dabney, Ray F. (1963). The History of the Band at Sam Houston State Teachers College. Sam Houston State Teachers College.
