= Marching Mocs =

Marching band of UT Chattanooga

- School: UTC
- Location: Chattanooga, Tennessee, USA
- Conference: Southern Conference
- Founded: 1886
- Director: Randall Coleman, Director of Bands
- Members: 125

The Marching Mocs are the marching band of the University of Tennessee at Chattanooga (UTC) located in Chattanooga, Tennessee, United States. The band performs at all Mocs home football games and select away games each year. The Marching Mocs are recognized as one of the nation's top collegiate marching bands. The Marching Mocs are popular for their performance of modern pop, rock, metal, and other popular genres songs that crowds can relate to.

== History ==
In March 2009, the Marching Mocs pep band was featured prominently on Late Night with Jimmy Fallon who picked the men's basketball team as his favorite underdog in the 2009 NCAA Division I men's basketball tournament.

== Traditions ==
=== First Tennessee Pavilion ===
The Marching Mocs perform in a parade and a pep rally in the First Tennessee Pavilion before the kick-off of all home football games with the cheerleaders, Sugar Mocs, Majorettes, Elite, and the UTC mascot, Scrappy the mockingbird.

=== First Down ===
Every time the football team receives a first down, it is tradition for the Marching Mocs to play what is known as the Woo-Woo. It is a sequence of two long tones that sound like a train horn with drum fill between long tones. This ties in with Chattanooga's history as a major railroad hub.

=== Pregame ===
During pregame, the Marching Mocs make the formation of the Chattanooga Athletic's logo on the field. The Marching Mocs always perform "Chattanooga Choo Choo", "The Star-Spangled Banner", The UTC Alma Mater, The UTC Fight Song, and the "Tennessee Waltz March" while on the field for the Pregame festivities.

== Marching Mocs Miscellanea ==
- Artists covered since 1999 include Red Hot Chili Peppers, Van Morrison, Mötley Crüe, Metallica, No Doubt, Michael Jackson, Barry White, Stevie Wonder, Alice in Chains, System of a Down, Kiss, OutKast, Madonna, Justin Timberlake, Santana, KC and the Sunshine Band, Parliament and Bootsy Collins, Tina Turner, Bill Withers, and many more.
- The Marching Mocs are one of the most innovative non-prop-oriented marching bands in the country, synthesizing styles of show band, traditional band, and drum corps.
- The Marching Mocs work on five primary shows. These include a patriotic show with the City of Chattanooga Pipes and Drums, a Band Day Show with high schools from the surrounding area, a homecoming show with alumni, a traditional halftime show, and a Pregame show.

== Pep Band ==
The University of Tennessee at Chattanooga's Pep Band performs at all home men's and women's basketball games. The pep band is also known as The World's Most Dangerous Pep Band. The pep band travels to the Southern Conference Men's and Women's Basketball Tournament, and to NCAA basketball tournaments with the Mocs and Lady Mocs. The pep band has the honor to be called the most entertaining, loudest, and best pep band in the Southern Conference.

== School songs ==
Alma Mater

Lookout Mountainr o'er us guarding,
Ceaseless watch doth keep.
In the valley stands our college,
where the shadows creep.

Refrain:
Chattanooga, Chattanooga!
Loud the anthem swell.
Sing, O Sing of alma mater.
All her praises tell.

As in days of blood and battle
On that mountain's height,
Soldiers fought, so she shall ever
Stand for truth and right.

(Refrain)

Loyally, we'll bear her standard,
Blazon'd gold and blue,
Forward, upward, ever onward,
Forth to dare and do.

(Refrain)

Fight Song

Fight, Chattanooga,
'Til the victory's finally won.
Mighty Mocs you know,
We're counting on you;
Go UTC Gold and Blue

Fight! Fight!

Roll on, Chattanooga,
Ride the rails and march to victory;
Ever more we pledge to always be True to UTC!
