= San Diego State University Marching Aztecs =

College marching band in San Diego, California

- School: San Diego State University
- Location: San Diego, California, U.S.
- Conference: Pac-12 Conference
- Founded: 1946; 80 years ago
- Director: Bryan K. Ransom
- Members: 240
- Fight song: "Fight On"
- Website: music.sdsu.edu/performing-groups/athletic-bands/marching-aztecs

The San Diego State University Marching Aztecs is the marching band of San Diego State University. The Marching Aztecs perform at every home football game along with local community events such as high school marching band competitions, campus events, and corporate events.

== Directors ==
Directors of the Marching Aztecs
Director	Years
John Philip Dalby	1946–1948
Myron Collins	1948–1950
Leo J. Christy	1950–1951
Norman Rost	1951–1969
Charles Yates	1970–1972
Terry O' Donnell	1973–1977
Harold Warman	1977–2003
Bryan Ransom	2003-

== Band Composition ==
=== Instrumentation ===
- Piccolo
- Flute
- Clarinet
- Alto Saxophone
- Tenor Saxophone
- Baritone Saxophone
- Bass Clarinet
- French Horn
- Mellophone
- Trombone
- Baritone
- Sousaphone
- Snare Drum
- Tenor Drums
- Bass Drums
- Marching Cymbals

=== Auxiliaries ===
- Dance Team
- Color Guard
- Feature Twirlers (team)
- Diamonds (HBCU-style majorette team)

== Repertoire ==
=== "Fight On" ===
"Fight On" is the fight song of the university. It was composed by Frank J. Losey, a junior in the music department. He was asked to do so by the university president, Walter R. Hepner.

=== "Hail Montezuma" ===
"Hail Montezuma" is the alma mater of the university. It was composed by music major Bob Austin under the name Peter Standish. The song was first used at a commencement in 1942, and officially adopted by the university in 1945.

== Service ==
The marching band is supported by the Zeta Xi chapter of Tau Beta Sigma. It was chartered on December 16, 1978.

The Eta Mu chapter of Kappa Kappa Psi was also chartered on December 16, 1978, but has since become inactive.

== Venues ==
The Marching Aztecs, supporting the football team, have performed in various locations such as:

- Balboa Stadium (1921–1935)
- Aztec Bowl (1936–1942, 1947–1966)
- San Diego Stadium (1967–2019)
- Dignity Health Sports Park (2020–2021)
- Snapdragon Stadium (2022–present)
