= Keith Stein Blue Thunder Marching Band =

College marching band in Boise, Idaho

- School: Boise State University
- Location: Boise, Idaho, U.S.
- Conference: Pac-12 Conference
- Founded: 1932; 94 years ago (original); 1987; 39 years ago (re-established)
- Director: Joe Tornello
- Assistant Director: Bill Waterman
- Members: 185
- Fight song: "Orange and Blue"
- Website: www.boisestate.edu/thunder/

The Keith Stein Blue Thunder Marching Band is the marching band of Boise State University. With over 180 members, the band supports the Boise State Broncos football team at Albertsons Stadium. The modern version of the band, re-established in 1987 after a period of inactivity, makes it the youngest band in the Pac-12 Conference.

== Origins ==
The BMB has origins as a pep band in the 1930s, transformation into a marching band in the 1950s, and was active until the 1976 when support and funds from the student body and community began to wane. The original version of the band was inactive until 1986, when a $250,000 scholarship donation from Keith and Catherine Stein allowed the music department to start talks of restarting the marching band. Over $500,000 were raised in support of marching band scholarships, and the modern version of the band debuted at a football game against Delaware State on September 5, 1987.

== Directors ==
The following list begins from the 1987 re-establishment of the band.

Directors of the Keith Stein Blue Thunder Marching Band
Director	Years
David A. Wells	1987-2008
Nathan Stark (interim)	2009
Eric Smedley	2010
Joe Tornello	2011-

== Band composition ==
=== Instrumentation ===
- Flute
- Piccolo
- Clarinet
- Alto Saxophone
- Tenor Saxophone
- Trombone
- Baritone
- Sousaphone
- Snare Drum
- Tenor Drums
- Bass Drum
- Cymbals

=== Auxiliaries ===
- Color Guard
- Twirler

== Repertoire ==
=== "Orange and Blue" ===
"Orange and Blue" is the fight song of the university. It was composed in 1940 by Boise State Junior College student Eldred Renk. It was revised in 1965 when the institution became Boise College. It was almost replaced in 1974 when the institution became Boise State University, but students voted to keep the fight song.

=== "Les Bois" ===
"Les Bois" is the alma mater of the university. It was written around 1940 by James L. Strachan and Grace Watson. Additional verses were added later by Helen Moore.

== Service ==
The Blue Thunder Marching Band is supported by the Iota Kappa chapter of Kappa Kappa Psi, which was chartered on April 14, 1990. The chapter is part of the Western district, and works to promote band activity throughout the university, develop leadership skills among its members, and foster communication and cooperation between other chapters, particularly those within the district.
