= Pride of Nicholls =

Marching Band of Nicholls State University

- School: Nicholls State University
- Location: Thibodaux, Louisiana
- Conference: Southland Conference
- Director: Benjamin Robichaux

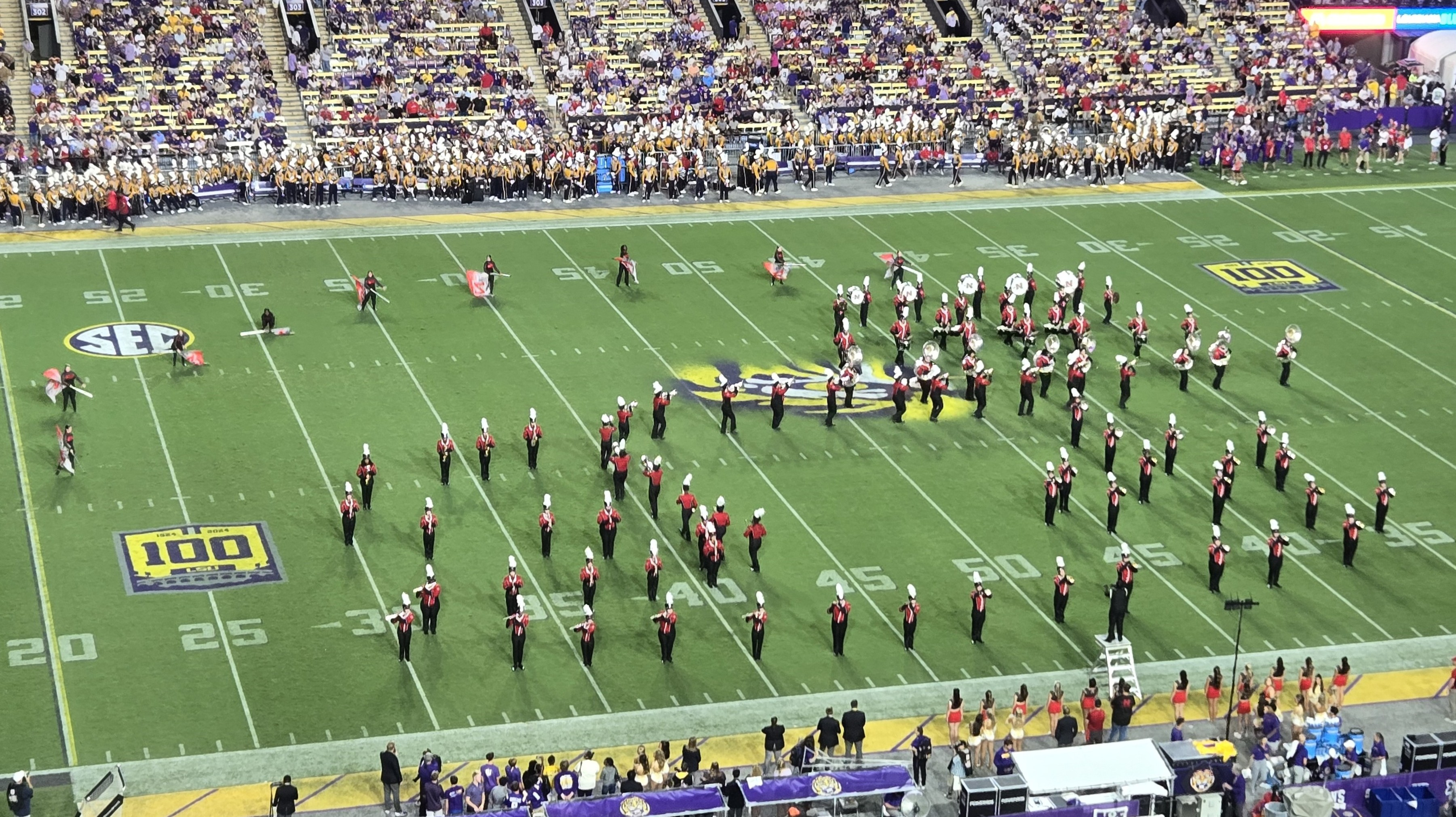
Pride of Nicholls Marching Band

The Pride of Nicholls is the marching band which represents Nicholls State University in Thibodaux, Louisiana. The Pride of Nicholls performs pregame and during halftime at all Nicholls Colonels home football games, selected away games and in exhibitions at selected marching festivals during the fall semester. There are 200 members.

The 6th Man Basketball Band performs at all home games during the spring semester and accompanies the Nicholls Colonels men's basketball team to the Southland Conference Basketball Tournament.

== Music ==
- Nicholls State University Alma Mater
- Nicholls State Colonels Fight Song

== See also ==
- Nicholls Colonels
- Nicholls State University
