= Elon University Fire of the Carolinas Marching Band =

College marching band in Elon, North Carolina

Fire of the Carolinas
- School: Elon University
- Location: Elon, North Carolina, USA
- Conference: Colonial Athletic Association
- Founded: 1938-1982, 2001-
- Director: Dr. Danny Frye (2026-Present)
- Members: 230

The Fire of the Carolinas, the marching band at Elon University, is a contemporary ensemble that performs at all Phoenix home football games, select away football games, and at various University events throughout the fall. All Elon students are eligible for membership within the band which includes winds, percussion, color guard, feature twirler, and dance team. FOTC members are from almost every area of study on campus, with over 30 different majors represented each year.

== History ==
The first reference to Elon College's (now Elon University) band marching onto the field to perform halftime shows is in Elon's 1938 yearbook. It was organized by student Landon Walker and had 22 members under Drum Major Harold Hilburn. The marching band lasted until 1982 and shut down due to disinterest. Bill DeJournett, band director at Colorado State University, was hired to resurrect Elon's band. The current director of the band is Dr. Danny Frye, who also serves as the school's wind ensemble director.

=== Directors ===
- Landon Davis Walker (1938)
- Charles R. Hamrick (1939)
- Howard Grier Brown (1940)
- Elbert F. Rhodes (1941-1949)
- Eugene Jacobowsky (1950)
- John S. Westmoreland (1952-1953)
- Laurence Hedgpeth (1954)
- Dewey M. Stowers, Jr. (1955-1959)
- Gene Patrick Johnson (1960-1961)
- Jack O. White (1962-1982)
- William (Bill) DeJournett (2001-2002)
- Tony Sawyer (2003-2012)
- Raul Barcenes (2013)
- Adam Kehl (2014–2018)
- Jonathan Poquette (2019–2026)
- Danny Frye (2026-Present)

== Traditions ==
The Fire of the Carolinas performs 3-4 high energy, entertainment focused halftime shows every year that includes a wide variety of music from classic rock, pop, and jazz, to modern alternative and current popular music. The band also performs a full collegiate pregame show. The band has a close-knit, family atmosphere. Members also receive a small scholarship that increases every year of participation in the band.

== Associations ==
Elon University has the Iota Xi chapter of Tau Beta Sigma that is connected to the band.
