= South Alabama Jaguar Marching Band =

Marching band of the University of South Alabama

- School: University of South Alabama
- Location: Mobile, Alabama, USA
- Conference: Sun Belt Conference
- Founded: 2009
- Director: Dr. William Hanks Petersen, Director of Bands, Director of Athletic Bands
- Associate Directors: Dr. Rob Abend, Associate Director of Bands/Athletic Bands and Mrs. Marsha Foster (Colorguard)
- Assistant Directors: Dr. Clayton Maddox, Tuba/Euph Professor
- Members: 260+

The South Alabama Jaguar Marching Band is a student organization that was approved by the University of South Alabama's board of trustees to debut in conjunction with the South Alabama football team in 2009. The decision was made on December 6, 2007.

The band debuted with 150 members at the first football game on September 5, 2009. The band grew to 250 members in 2013. The Jaguar Marching Band is housed in the Department of Music in the College of Arts and Sciences, the University of South Alabama's largest academic division.

== Pre-game ==
The USA Jaguar Marching Band is an integral part of South Alabama football game-day atmosphere. Before kick-off, the band plays for fans throughout the tailgating areas surrounding Hancock Whitney Stadium. As the team arrives for the pre-game walk to the locker room, known as "The Prowl", the band performs for the players, coaches, and fans. The Jaguar Marching Band's pre-game show uses knee lifts, shoulder swagger, and other traditional collegiate marching styles. The Pre-Game show consist of "Jaguar Pride" (the original fight song for the University) with the band forming JAGS to both the student side and the press box side, "Patriotic Medley" which culminates with the band hitting their iconic "USA", while in the "USA" set the marching band performs the Star-Spangled Banner and the Universities Alma Mater, and finally the band heads down the field playing the Universities modern fight song "South!"

== Halftime ==
The Jaguar Marching Band performs three different halftime shows each season. The band marches a modern, corps style, with a focus on velocity (often marching in the 180-200 beats per minute range). Shows range across a wide variety of musical eras and styles. The band's first ever halftime show was a Led Zeppelin tribute, featuring nine different songs by that band. Other past shows include the jazz-rock music of Bill Chase, Tchaikovsky's 1812 Overture, and progressive and alternative rock such as Radiohead, Red Hot Chili Peppers, and Rush, and new pop music by Miley Cyrus and Billie Eilish. During the 2012 season, the band performed a Classical Music show, a "Tribute to the State of Alabama" production, and also a halftime show saluting the five branches of America's Armed Forces. The Jaguar Marching Band plays shows in alternating weeks first to the home side of the stadium and next to the opposite stands, home to the South Alabama student section. This is to ensure that both alumni and students experience the band, a tribute to the student body's initiative in bringing marching band and football to the University of South Alabama.

== Current Halftime Shows ==
In the current 2022 season, the Jaguar Marching Band will be performing shows titled “JMB Back to Broadway” featuring selections from Dear Evan Hansen, Hamilton, Les Miserables, and Wicked as well as “JMB Sing-A-Long”, featuring crowd participation!

== Exhibitions and Community Performances ==
The Jaguar Marching Band performs at multiple exhibition and community performances each year. The band performs three to four exhibitions at high school marching band competitions and football games throughout the state and region each fall. In 2012, the Jaguar Marching Band performed at halftime in the New Orleans Super Dome during the New Orleans Saints vs. Atlanta Falcons game. The ensemble also performs in one Mobile Mardi Gras parade each year. Other community performances include the 2010 and 2012 Mobile Veterans' Day Parades, and the 2011 Senior Bowl held in Ladd–Peebles Stadium. The Jaguar Marching Band had a banner year in 2014, including performances at Governor Robert Bentley's 2015 Inauguration as well as the band's first bowl game performance at the inaugural 2014 Raycom Media Camellia Bowl. In addition, the JMB welcomed over 500 students at the 2014 Jaguar Marching Honor Band, the largest attendance at the event since its inception. In 2021 the Jaguar Marching Band performed at the Trussville Marching Invitational at Hewitt-Trussville High School in Trussville, AL. In 2022, the Jaguar Marching Band is performing at “The Swamp Classic”, at Gautier High School in Gautier, MS.

== South Alabama Marching Band Championships ==
The Jaguar Marching Band hosts a competition open to all schools around the region. This competition utilizes a 10-person adjudication panel, with judges on and off the field. Up to 30 bands compete yearly.

== Recordings ==
Each season, the Jaguar Marching Band produces a CD recording highlighting halftime productions, school songs and cheers, and the traditional pre-game show. This recording is given away as a recruiting and promotional item to fans, alumni, and potential members. In 2012, the band released its fourth annual highlights CD, "Celebrating 50 Years," to mark the 50th anniversary of the University of South Alabama. In February 2013, at the request of the DevMusic Company, the band recorded that publisher's demo catalogue, to be distributed to thousands of schools and websites in the United States and the Netherlands.
