= Texas State University Bobcat Marching Band =

College marching band in San Marcos, Texas

Bobcat Marching Band The Pride of the Hill Country
- School: Texas State University
- Location: San Marcos, Texas, U.S.
- Conference: Pac-12 Conference
- Founded: 1919; 107 years ago
- Director: Kyle Glaser
- Members: 350+
- Fight song: "Go Bobcats"
- Motto: Somos Músicos
- Website: www.txst.edu/bands/bands/marchingband.html

The Bobcat Marching Band, or The Pride of the Hill Country, is the marching band of Texas State University. With over 350 members, it is the largest marching band in the Pac-12 Conference.

The band primarily supports Texas State Bobcats football while also forming the Bobcat Basketball Band for basketball games. The Bobcat Marching Band has performed at Lyndon B. Johnson's inauguration, Bill Clinton's inaugration, several state and national music conferences, and was featured in director Colin Higgins' 1982 film, "The Best Little Whorehouse in Texas".

== Directors ==
Directors of the Bobcat Marching Band
| Director | Years |
|---|---|
| D. D. Snow | 1919-1922 |
| Robert A. Tampke | 1923-1948 |
| Fred Eggert | 1949 |
| David E. Leighton | 1950-1951 |
| Maurice Callahan | 1952-1953 |
| Anton "Tony" Bek | 1954-1971 |
| Doug Wiehe | 1972-1973 |
| James Sudduth | 1974-1980 |
| Tom Waggoner | 1981-1986 |
| James Williamson | 1987-2002 |
| Rodney Schueller | 2003-2006 |
| Caroline Beatty | 2007-2011 |
| Kyle Glaser | 2012- |

== Band composition ==
=== Instrumentation ===
- Piccolo
- Clarinet
- Alto Saxophone
- Tenor Saxophone
- Trumpet
- Mellophone
- Trombone
- Baritone
- Sousaphone
- Snare drums
- Tenor drums
- Bass drums
- Cymbals

=== Auxiliaries ===
- Color Guard
- Twirlers

== Repertoire ==
=== "Go Bobcats" ===
"Go Bobcats" is the fight song of the university. It was composed in 1961 by Paul Yoder on commission.

=== Alma Mater ===
"Alma Mater" is the alma mater of the university. The lyrics were penned by Texas State professor Jessie Sayers in the early 1900s. It was set to the hymn "Ancient of Days", written by J. Albert Jeffery in 1886.

=== Other common tunes ===
- Bleacher Feature
- Bobcat Olé (La Virgen de la Macarena)
- Deep in the Heart of Texas
- Dudley Do Right
- Eat 'Em Up Cats
- Lets Go Cats
- Immigrant Song
- March to the Stadium
- Mars, the Bringer of 4th Downs (Mars by Holst)
- Metal Shop
- Rock n' Roll Pt. II (The Hey Song)
- Techno
- Texas State Fanfare - The Hill Country Theme

== Service ==
The marching band is supported by the Theta Alpha chapter of Kappa Kappa Psi. It was installed on February 19, 1984 with the help of the Zeta Gamma chapter of Texas Lutheran University.

The Eta Epsilon chapter of Tau Beta Sigma was installed on February 25, 1984, but has since gone inactive.

== Venues ==
The Bobcat Marching band have performed primarily at the following locations:

- Evans Field, originally Normal Field (1919-1931)
- Evans Field, also known as Kyle Field (1932-1980)
- UFCU Stadium (1981-present)
