= Sacramento State Marching Band =

Marching band of California State University, Sacramento

- Nickname: SSMB
- School: California State University, Sacramento
- Location: Sacramento, California
- Conference: Mid-American Conference
- Founded: 1955
- Director: Kalei Cablay
- Members: 162 (2026)
- Fight song: "Fight Hornet Fight!"

The Sacramento State Marching Band (SSMB) is the official marching band at California State University, Sacramento. The band performs at all home football games and various away games during the football season. The SSMB also functions as the student cheering section at athletic events including football, volleyball, and basketball.

== History ==
The SSMB was formed in 1955, when it was known as the Sacramento State Marching Musicians. Its first director was Dr Norman J. Hunt. His successor was Ronald Holloway, who was in charge of the band from the mid-1960s until 1981. Holloway retired in 1992 and is now professor emeritus. Holloway was succeeded by Dr Jack Foote, who oversaw the SSMB until 1995. Dr Foote is now a professor emeritus in the university's School of Music and has been inducted into the SSMB Hall of Fame.

Dr Jeffrey Edom directed the band from 1996 to 2007, a period that is remembered as the Edom era. Edom oversaw the growth of the band from 37 members to 100 members, designed two of the band's uniforms, and established the first Sacramento State Winter Drumline. He also changed the name of the band to what it is today. Edom was inducted into the SSMB Hall of Fame on October 24, 2021.

Dr. Clay Redfield took over after Edom in 2008, at one point serving Sacramento State simultaneously as the Director of Bands, the Director of Marching & Athletic Bands, and Professor of Education. He resigned from his position of athletic bands director in 2018 and currently still works within the School of Music as the Professor of Education.

Santiago A. Sabado began his reign in 2018 as the up-and-coming young band director. His skill in budgeting, recruiting, scheduling, and overall impressive organization of the position brought the band's membership to an all-time high of 187 as of 2022. On August 6, 2021, the SSMB welcomed a new assistant director of Athletic Bands to the team, Christopher Langton. Sabado and Langton ran the marching band for the next two years, maintaining partnerships with Mandarins Drum and Bugle Corps to supply food, transportation, and extra instruments. During Sabado's 2022 season, he coined the saying "Build the Empire! Take over the World!" that would be echoed by the band whenever shouted by him. Sabado resigned from the program at the end of the 2022 season. Langton guided the Pep Band, Trash Band, and Sac State Indoor groups during the 2023 spring season.

Dr James Long became the SSMB director in August 2023 but resigned his position in July 2024.

The SSMB traditionally performed at the annual Causeway Classic against its arch-rival, UC Davis up until the 2026 fall season.ip

Although it the group is primarily composed of students who attend Sacramento State, the SSMB welcomes all who are interested in devoting their time to the group. Those who are not enrolled at Sacramento State are permitted into the band as volunteers. These volunteers typically include students enrolled in various other colleges (i.e. community colleges) who may or may not have an existing athletics bands program. Volunteers must be pre-approved as a university volunteer beforehand.

There are no auditions required for members interested in playing a woodwind or brasswind instrument. There are, however, required placement auditions for those interested in joining the battery, color guard, or front ensemble.

Sacramento State students who are enrolled in the SSMB are provided with priority registration for the Spring and Fall semesters following their commitment to the band in the immediately previous season.

== Winter Activities (WGI) ==
Winter marching activities include the Sacramento State Indoor Percussion Ensemble and the Sacramento State Winter Guard. Similar to membership in the marching band, there are required placement auditions for all positions. Both ensembles require a minimum age of 18 years of age.

=== Indoor Percussion ===
The Sacramento State Indoor Percussion Ensemble (SSI) existed informally and performed exhibition shows at local winter percussion events pre-2019 but did not compete in any official circuits. The ensemble began competing in 2019 and has since participated in regional indoor percussion circuits including the Northern California Band Association (NCBA) Winter Guard & Percussion, Northern California Percussion Alliance (NCPA), and official Winter Guard International (WGI) regionals. The ensemble hovered between Independent A (PIA) division and Independent Open (PIO). As of 2026, they place in PIO.

== The Pep Band ==
The Sacramento State Hornet Revue (better known as the Sacramento State Pep Band) is the smaller subset of the marching band and usually performs as the official pep band. The Hornet Revue performs at home volleyball and basketball games that take place in Yosemite Hall's "The Hive" court and at Golden 1 Center for the basketball Causeway Classic between Sacramento State Hornets and UC Davis Aggies.

== The Soccer Trash Band ==
On August 13, 2021, the SSMB debuted a new branch to their spirit groups under the name "Trash Band" (or "Trash Gig"). This spirit group consists of steel trash cans, plastic buckets, bass drums, and cheering to create all kinds of noise at the Hornet Soccer Field for the Men's and Women's Hornet Soccer Teams.

== Traditions ==
=== Marching Style ===
The Sacramento State Marching Band marches the straight-leg glide step style.

=== The Rivalry ===
The SSMB has sought to maintain the Sacramento State Hornets and UC Davis Aggies rivalry alive, highlighted each year at by the annual Causeway Classic during their time as members of the Big Sky Conference. However, with Sacramento State's move to the Mid-American Conference, this may disrupt or discontinue the series.

==== Trooping ====
Trooping is a tradition of the SSMB performed usually during game days, parade performances, or other school functions. The SSMB marches in parade block formation usually accompanied by the color guard along with Sacramento State Cheer Team and Dance Team. During Trooping, the battery plays its signature "Rumble" cadence and the band stops and plays for tailgaters prior to home football games.

=== Repertoire ===
The band's musical repertoire consists of various classic rock, jazz, funk, grunge, metal, Latin and pop tunes, as well as the school's fight song, "Fight Hornet Fight".

== See also ==
- University of Montana Grizzly Marching Band (Another Big Sky Conference marching band)
