= Western Kentucky Big Red Marching Band =

College marching band in Bowling Green, Kentucky

Big Red Marching Band
- School: Western Kentucky University
- Location: Bowling Green, Kentucky
- Conference: Conference USA
- Founded: 1925
- Director: Dr. Matthew McCurry and Dr. Gary Schallert
- Members: 260

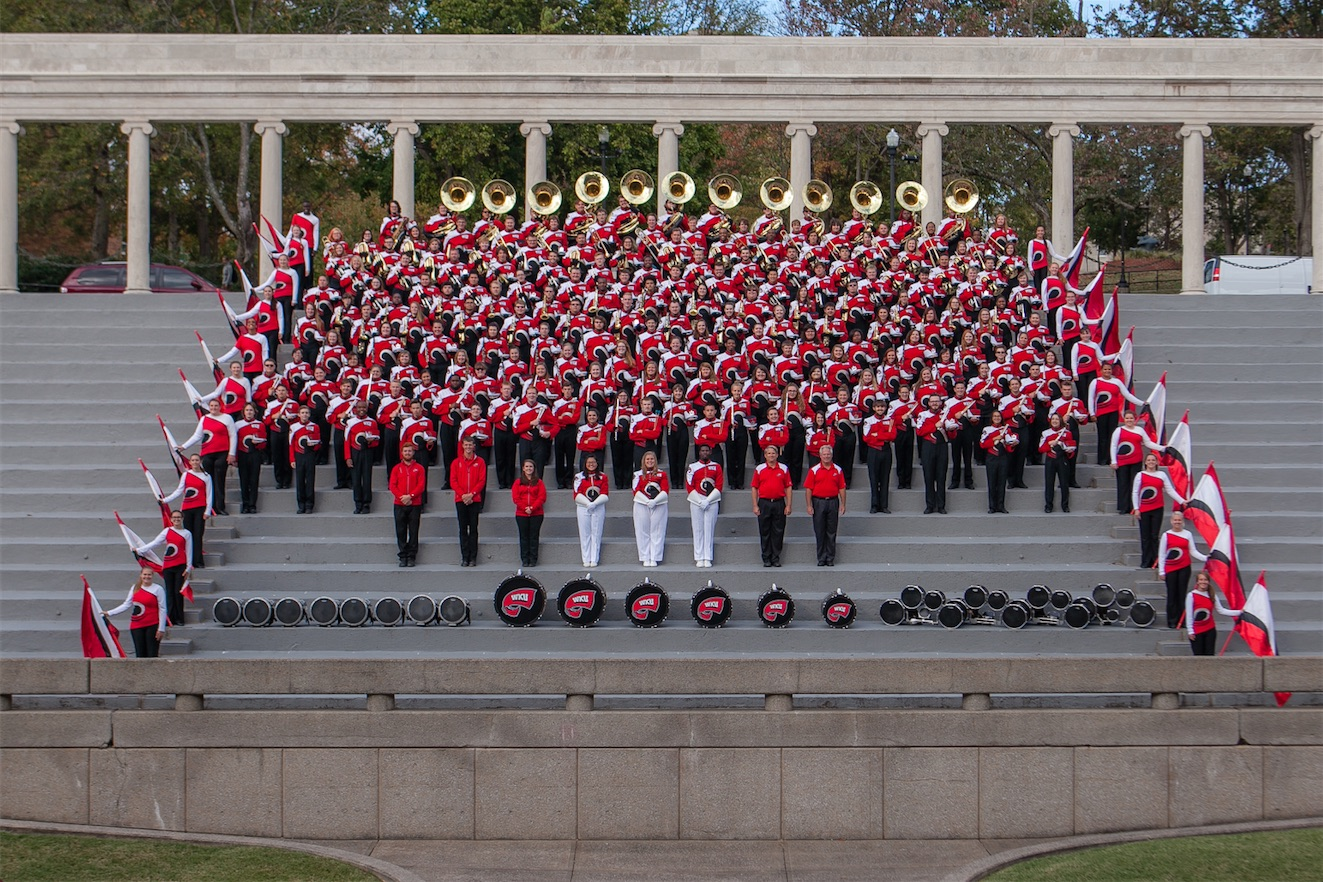

The Big Red Marching Band (also known as The Pride of the Hilltoppers) is the name of the marching band organized by Western Kentucky University. The band was formed in 1925 at what was then Western Kentucky Teachers College. Around 1939, the band became a regular feature at every home game of the WKTC football team and raised its participation above 100 members for the first time. The music department began to expand and establish a chamber wind and symphonic concert band program over the next few decades and by 1993, the band had achieved a total of 170 members.

Today, the band program at WKU boasts several athletic and concert bands and entertains audiences in sports venues and concert halls on the WKU campus, the Commonwealth of Kentucky, and the nation. The BRMB now has over 260 members.

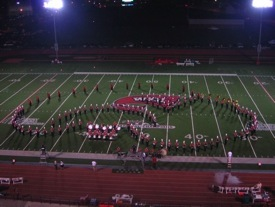
Western Kentucky University Big Red Marching Band

The Big Red Marching Band (BRMB) performs at all home football games, some away games, local campus and community functions, and is a regular exhibition band for high school marching band competitions throughout the region. The BRMB is the most visible ensemble in the WKU Department of Music. The BRMB has performed on the national level at several National Football League games, most notably for the Indianapolis Colts and the Tennessee Titans.

The uniforms include a red and white coat accented with silver trim, forming an abstract red towel logo. There is a WKU red towel emblem on the left breast and right shoulder. Pants, shoes, and plume are solid black. The shako is red, white, and black with silver accents and a mirror-like WKU cupola on the front.
