= Oregon State University Marching Band =

College marching band in Corvallis, Oregon

Oregon State University Marching Band (OSUMB) The Spirit and Sound of OSU
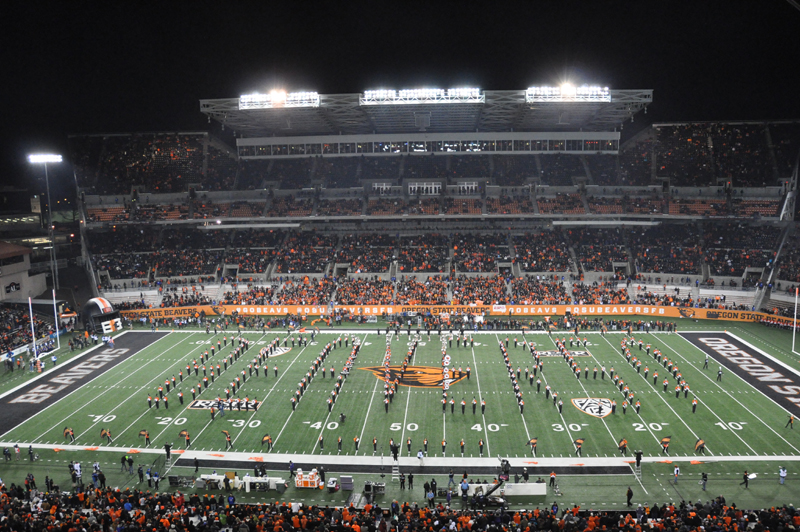
- OSUMB performing the "Great Beaver Spell-Out" in 2013
- School: Oregon State University
- Location: Corvallis, Oregon, US
- Conference: Pac-12
- Founded: 1891
- Director: Olin Hannum
- Members: 265+
- Fight song: "Hail to Old OSU"
- Website: https://www.oregonstateband.org/

Oregon State University Marching Band, ("OSUMB"), is the marching band of Oregon State University, known as the "Spirit and Sound of OSU." The band was established in 1891. It is one of the oldest bands in the Pac-12 and the primary athletic band at Oregon State. In addition to the Oregon State University Marching Band, other athletic bands include Basketball Band, Rhythm & Beavs, Rhythm & Beavs: Travel Band, the Away Game Pep Band (for select away games), Alumni Band (the band that covers any games occurring prior to the start of the school term), Gymnastics Band (the ensemble that performs at home gymnastic meets; this ensemble also include alumni members), and Bar Band (a small ensemble that tours local bars on the day before a home football game). All band members are required to participate in marching band before they may be eligible to participate in any of the other athletic bands Oregon State offers.

The Athletic Bands program is based partially on the same program at Kansas State University.

== History ==
- 1890 –The Oregon State University Marching Band was founded.
- 1890 – Brass band organized in November; students had to procure their own instruments.
- 1892 – Cadet Band played at first school athletic event, an all-school intramural "Field Day."
- 1893 – Cadet Band played at the first school football game, held in Albany, Oregon.
- 1901 – Self-sustaining Department of Music established.
- 1914 – "Hail to Old O.A.C." is written by Wilkins.
- 1917 – "Carry Me Back," is written by W. Homer Maris.
- 1919 – "Carry Me Back," is adopted by OSU as the Alma Mater.
- 2013 – Dr. Dana Biggs is named the Director of Athletic Bands.
- 2015 – Dr. Jason Gossett is named the Assistant Director of Athletic Bands.
- 2016 – Mr. Olin Hannum is named the Director of Athletic Bands.

== Staff ==
=== Staff members ===
- Olin Hannum, Associate Director of Bands and Director of Athletic Bands
- Justin Preece, Percussion Coordinator and Drumline Instructor
- Kristin Heckers, Color Guard Instructor and Choreographer
- David Manela, Staff Assistant
- Kathleen Smith, Staff Assistant

=== Former directors ===
Years	Director
	Capt. Harry L. Beard
1949-1967	Ted Mesang
1968-1999	Dr. James Douglas
1999-2002	Lewis Norfleet
2002-2013	Dr. Brad Townsend
2013-2016	Dr. Dana Biggs
2016–present	Olin Hannum

== Student leadership ==
=== Drum majors ===
The drum major is the leader of the band, and is chosen from among the student body of the band.

=== Section leaders ===
Each section has one to four section leaders based on section size. Section leaders provide student leadership in all aspects of the organization, especially during sectional rehearsals.

== Membership ==
Membership is open to any Oregon State University or Linn-Benton Community College student. Students are welcome from all fields of study.

== Game day ==
The Oregon State University Marching Band performs at all Oregon State University home and bowl games. During these game days, the marching band begins their day with a pre-performance rehearsal. During this rehearsal, the band will briefly rehearse the halftime show and the pre-game sequence. After rehearsal, the band will set up a parade block to prepare for the "Beaver Walk" (an event where the football team walks west on SW Ralph Miller Street. Prior to the start of the game, the band congregates inside Reser Stadium for an on-field pregame performance. The only exception to this is Civil War at OSU. Instead of a parading, the band will meet with the Oregon Marching Band face-to-face for Battle of the Bands.

During the football games, the band plays music from their seats in the stands, and during halftime performs an on-field show.

At the conclusion of each home game the band performs the fight song "Hail to OSU" and the alma mater "Carry Me Back to OSU". Additional music is performed in a post-game show from the stands.

== Away game trips ==
The Oregon State Marching Band typically attends one away game each year, in addition to the Civil War if it is held at the University of Oregon. The entire band travels to any high-profile Bowl Games, while lower-tiered Bowl Games usually are accompanied by a smaller "pep band" from within the band.

=== Bowl game appearances ===
- 2001 Fiesta Bowl (full band)
- 2002 Insight Bowl (pep band)
- 2003 Las Vegas Bowl (pep band)
- 2004 Insight Bowl (pep band)
- 2006 Sun Bowl (full band)
- 2007 Emerald Bowl (pep band)
- 2008 Sun Bowl (full band)
- 2009 Las Vegas Bowl (pep band)
- 2012 Alamo Bowl (full band)
- 2021 LA Bowl (full band)
- 2022 Las Vegas Bowl (full band)
- 2023 Sun Bowl (partial band)

== Uniforms ==
=== Types of uniforms ===
The marching band has three different variations to their uniform; the uniform that the marching band wears will depend on the type of event. There are three different variations: Full Dress, "Beaver Casual", and "Beaver Scuzzy". Full Dress is used exclusively during the fall season and only during special parades and most football games. "Beaver Casual" is used as the default uniform primarily for pep band events, basketball band, and other related events that do not require the full uniform; this uniform can be used year-round. The Beaver Casual uniform consists of the OSU Band baseball cap, orange polo, black slacks, black belt, and black socks and shoes. "Beaver Scuzzy" consist of the orange OSU band T-shirt and blue jeans and is normally used for informal events such as bar band.

=== Earlier uniforms (1989 and earlier) ===
Orange and white jackets, tall helmets, and large white plumes.

Other previous uniforms have included a version with shoulder-tassels and other regalia, black uniforms with orange half-capes and orange military helmets (used in 1941 season), and military cadet uniforms.

Past Featured Twirlers have historically worn uniforms mainly of white with short or no legs.

=== 1997–2005 ===
The previous set of uniforms consistent of orange and black jackets with silver sequins, as well as black gloves and gauntlets, black pants and shoes, black shako, and black and silver tasseled plumes.

=== 2006–2015 ===
Orange and black jackets with white stripes and the "Beavers" logo in the center of a white shield on the front, white gauntlets, white gloves, black pants, and black shako with mirrors and black feathered plumes. The drum majors have an alternate version, substituting the jacket colors of orange and black with black and white, larger white plumes, and optional black gauntlets.

=== 2016–present ===
The new uniforms were unveiled July 2016. The uniform consists of a tall, 16" black feather plume with a shako featuring an orange colored front side. The jacket features an orange and black body color split featuring the beaver logo on the wearer's top left and the Oregon State logo embroidered vertically along the black edge of the split. The rear side of the jacket features the orange OSU block letters arranged vertically along the back side. The features a traditional canopy that resembles traditional uniforms college bands traditionally wear. The gauntlets are black with the beaver script logo embroidered on them; these are worn with black gloves. Bibber pants are black with no unique design features. The overall design of the uniform borrowed many design elements from uniform designs of the 70's with contemporary styling from new the logos and colors.

== Band composition ==
=== Instrumentation ===
The instrumentation does not include percussion typically located in the "Front Ensemble" or "Pit" (Bells and other instruments on wheels) due to the band's emphasis on performing for the crowd, as opposed to the drum corps style utilized by most high schools and by a handful of university marching bands. Larger sections have multiple parts and divide up the sections to play those parts.

- Piccolo
- Clarinet
- Alto Saxophone
- Tenor Saxophone
- Mellophone
- Trumpet
- Trombone
- Baritone
- Sousaphone
- Battery Percussion (Bass drums, tenor drums, snare drums, cymbals)

=== Color guard ===
- Flags
- Rifles

== Repertoire ==
=== Fight Song: "Hail to Old OSU" ===
"Hail to Old OSU" is the fight song for Oregon State University. It was published by Harold A. Wilkins (Class of 1907) in 1914. It was originally called "Hail to Old O.A.C." and has evolved over time as the school's name and initials underwent changes to Oregon State College, and later, Oregon State University. The song originally consisted of two verses and a chorus, but only the chorus is sung today.

=== Alma Mater ===
The OSU Alma Mater, "Carry Me Back", was written by W. Homer Maris.

Within a vale of western mountains,
There's a college we hold dear.
Her shady slopes and fountains
Oft to me appear.
I love to wander on the pathway
Down to the Trysting Tree,
For there again I see in fancy,
Old friends dear to me.

[CHORUS]
Carry me back to OSU,
Back to her vine-clad halls;
Thus fondly ever in my mem'ry
Alma Mater calls.

== Service ==
The marching band is supported by the Theta chapter of Kappa Kappa Psi. It was chartered on May 12, 1923. The chapter has gone through periods of inactivity, one notably due to World War II. It was most recently rechartered on January 3, 2009, with assistance of the Gamma chapter at the University of Washington.

The Delta Zeta chapter of Tau Beta Sigma was chartered on February 22, 1970, but is currently inactive.

== Notable alumni ==
- Founding members of The Crazy 8's, a popular college band in the 1980s known for its hit "Johnny Q."
- George Bruns, noted music arranger for the Walt Disney Company
