= Western Illinois University Marching Leathernecks =

Marching band

WIU Marching Leathernecks
- Nickname: ML’s
- School: Western Illinois University
- Location: Macomb, IL
- Conference: Ohio Valley Conference (OVC)
- Founded: 1904
- Director: Dr. Matthew Thomas (2010 - )
- Members: 160
- Fight song: "We're Marching On"
- Motto: You’ll never walk alone

Uniform
- Website: www.wiu.edu/cofac/bands/ensembles/marching_band/

The Western Illinois University Marching Leathernecks is the marching band for Western Illinois University in Macomb, Illinois. The group was formed in 1904.

This performing ensemble includes students from many different academic majors at the university. Membership is open to any student on the Macomb campus regardless of major and does not require an audition except for leadership positions like section leader, drum major, senior assistant, equipment manager, etc.

== Performance Information ==
Their performances have included halftime shows for the Kansas City Chiefs, St. Louis Rams, Indianapolis Colts, and Chicago Bears of the National Football League, as well as exhibition performances at the Bands of America Regional Championships at the Edward Jones Dome in St. Louis, Missouri and at the RCA Dome in Indianapolis, Indiana. Western Illinois University also hosts the Marching Band Classic, a high school marching band competition that attracts bands from Illinois, Iowa and Missouri. The Marching Leathernecks also perform for Leatherneck football games, both home and away, parades, exhibitions, and regional tours. The full schedule may be viewed on the bands WIU band's website.

== Traditions ==
The band has a rich history and many traditions. The tradition of "Georgia On My Mind" has been in practice since 1982. At the end of every show the band plays its traditional closer, "Georgia on My Mind". This piece features a trumpet soloist and an interesting presentation of the band. For this tune the brass is packed against the fence, right next to the crowd. Halfway through, the brass turns as one to face the crowd while playing as loudly as possible.

After each performance, the band forms an inner facing circle to perform "You'll Never Walk Alone" from Carousel. This piece, which is performed for the group themselves instead of its audience, is used strengthen the commitment of the members to one another as individuals and helps to bond the group as a caring, compassionate family, both on and off the field. This has only been officially recorded once in the history of the group. That recording was made during a tribute to Dale Hopper who passed suddenly in the Fall of 2005.

== Instrumentation ==
The Marching Leathernecks consist of four major components: wind instruments, percussion, color guard, and danceline.

The wind instrumentation consists of both woodwind and brass instruments.

Woodwind:

- Piccolo
- Flute
- Clarinet
- Alto and Tenor Saxophone

Brass:

- Trumpet
- Mellophone
- Trombone
- Baritone (Marching)
- Sousaphone

The Percussion instrumentation consists of a drumline. (Note: the percussion section did at one time also consist of a front "pit" ensemble as well, but was eliminated due to transportation and storage issues)

Drumline:

- Cymbal
- Snare (Marching)
- Toms (Marching)
- Bass Drum (Marching)

The last two major components are the color guard and danceline named Westernaires and Westernettes to keep with the WIU "Western" theme. Along with these two larger groups there is often one or two twirlers and three drum majors.

Color Guard (Westernaires):

- Flags

Danceline (Westernettes):

- Dancers/Poms

Twirler

- Baton

Drum Major

- Core Style

== See also ==
- Western Illinois University
- Western Illinois Leathernecks
