= Marching Sound Machine =

Marching Band of North Carolina Central University

NCCU Sound Machine Marching Band
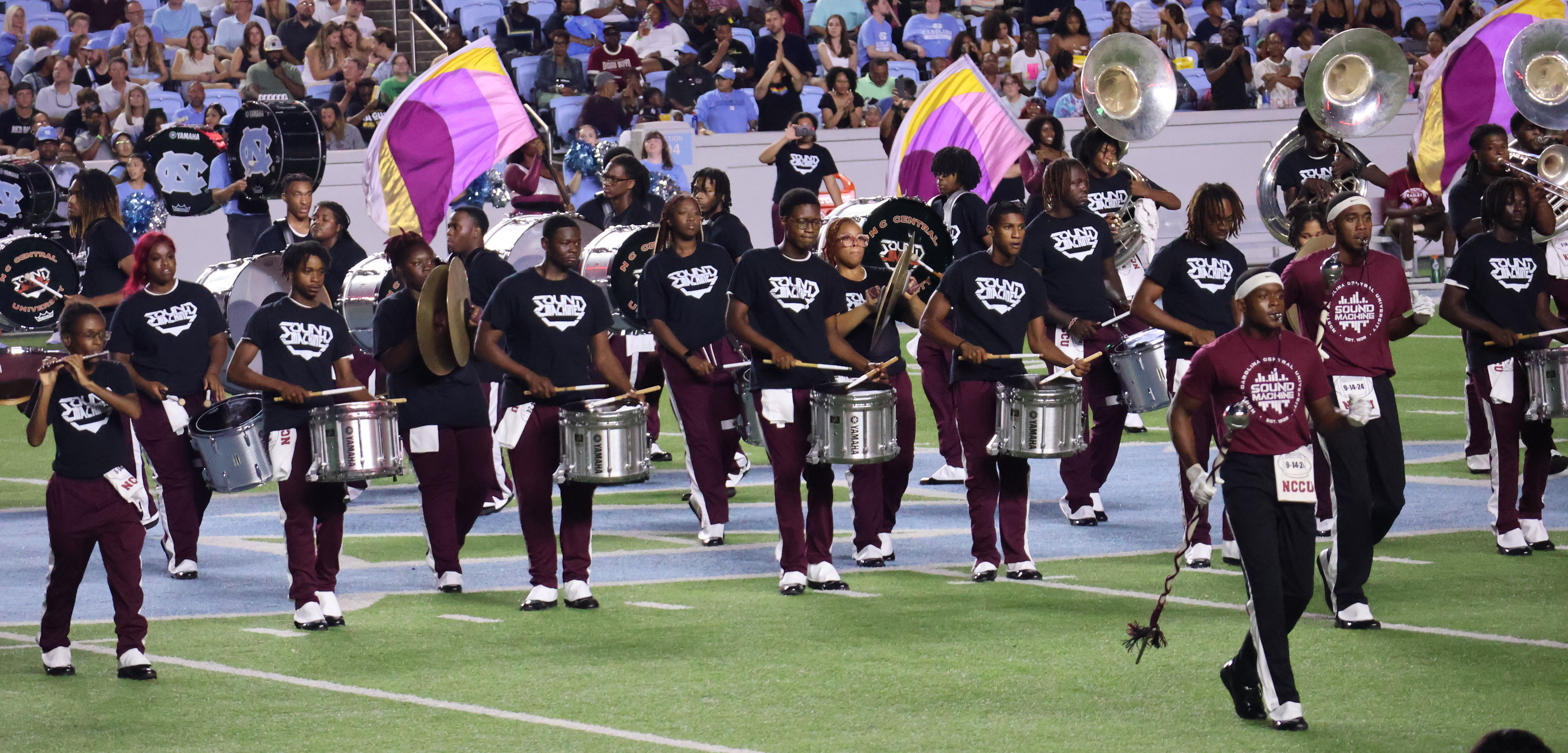
- Drumline of the marching band in 2024
- School: North Carolina Central University
- Location: Durham, North Carolina
- Conference: MEAC
- Founded: 1938
- Director: Jovan Alexander Wilson
- Assistant Director: Kynan J. Hudson
- Members: 210
- Fight song: "NCCU Fight Song"

The Sound Machine is the official marching band of North Carolina Central University. The Sound Machine performs pre-game and halftime shows at all North Carolina Central home games and travels to most away games.

== History ==
The history of the North Carolina Central's Marching Band dates back to the 1930s when Dr. Stephen Junius Wright, an assistant professor of education at the then North Carolina College in Durham, was asked to organize the first marching band. The inaugural band was believed to have about 25 musicians.

In 1958, Dr. Richard Henry Lee Jones, became the fifth band director to lead the program. Jones is credited for growing the band to around 120 members and gaining both national and local recognition for their performances. In 1960, the band performed at the inauguration for then Governor of North Carolina, Terry Sanford. The following year, the band performed during halftime of the New York Giants-Dallas Cowboys football game in front of 56,000 fans at Yankee Stadium.

Following the tenure of Dr. Jones, a number of succeeding directors carried on the legacy of the band program, including Ms. Robyn Reaves who in 1997 became the first female band director in the CIAA. In 2001, Mr. Jorim Reid was named band director. Reid was responsible for a number of changes to the program, including the introduction of marching techniques commonly found in corp style marching. Under Reid's leadership the Marching Sound Machine increased to around 200 members, and made a number of national appearances including six appearances at the Honda Battle of the Bands in Atlanta, Georgia and participation in the 122nd Rose Parade in Pasadena, California. In 2015, Mr. Thurman D. Hollins assumed leadership as director of bands.

== Leadership ==
Directly overseeing the Sound Machine is Professor Jovan Alexander Wilson. Jovan Alexander Wilson is a 2017 graduate of Delaware State University in Dover, DE, where he received his baccalaureate degree: one in Music Performance with a focus in Trumpet Studies. As a professional, Wilson has also completed a master level degree in education (M.Ed.) from National University, where he studied Leadership in Higher Education & completed a second masters degree in Music and Music education (MMME) from the Longy School of Music at Bard College in Instrumental Conducting. Wilson is a doctoral candidate, graduating with his Doctorate Degree (D.A.) from the Winter’s Conservatory of Music at William Carey University in Music Education.

== Composition ==
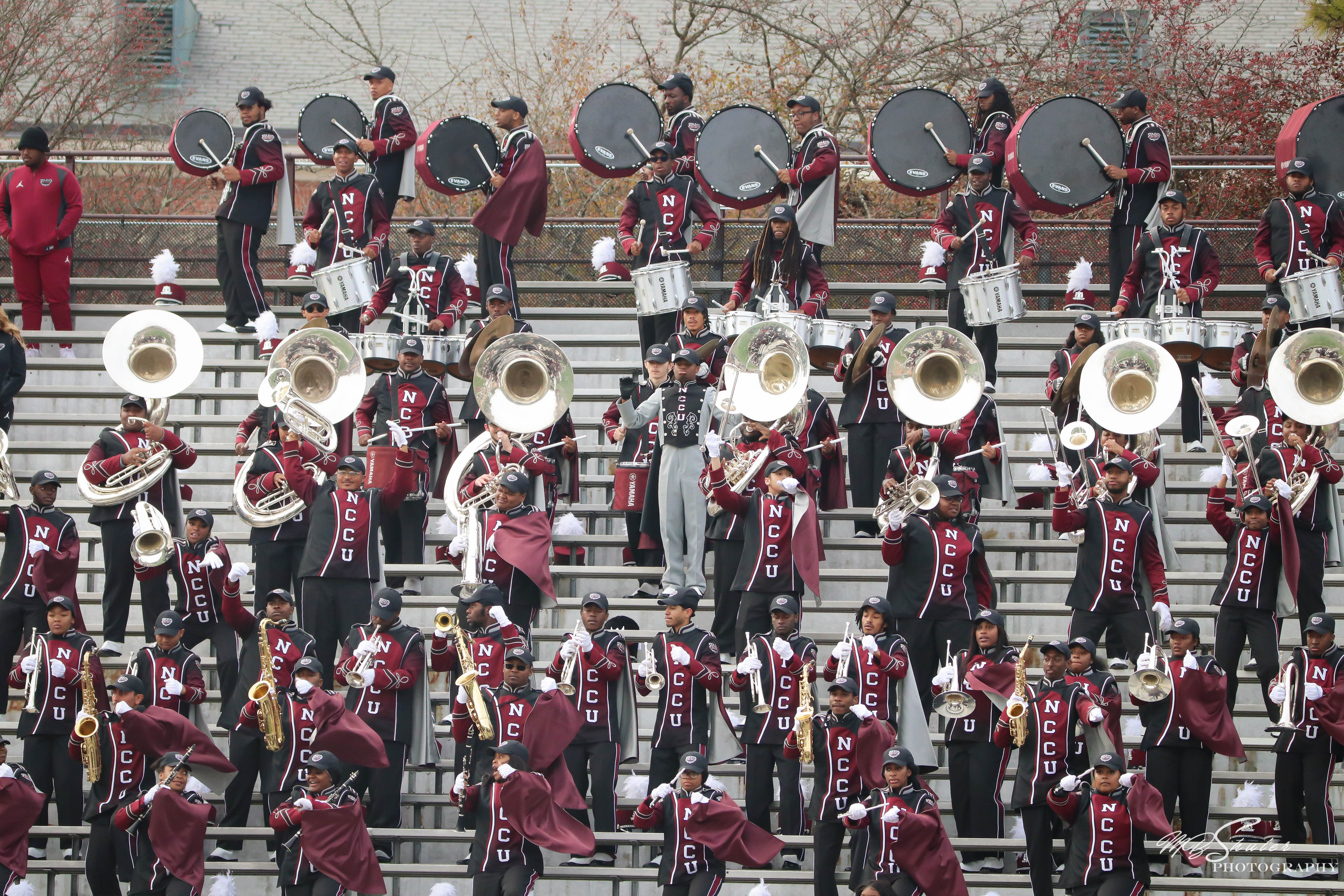
The Marching Sound Machine in 2019

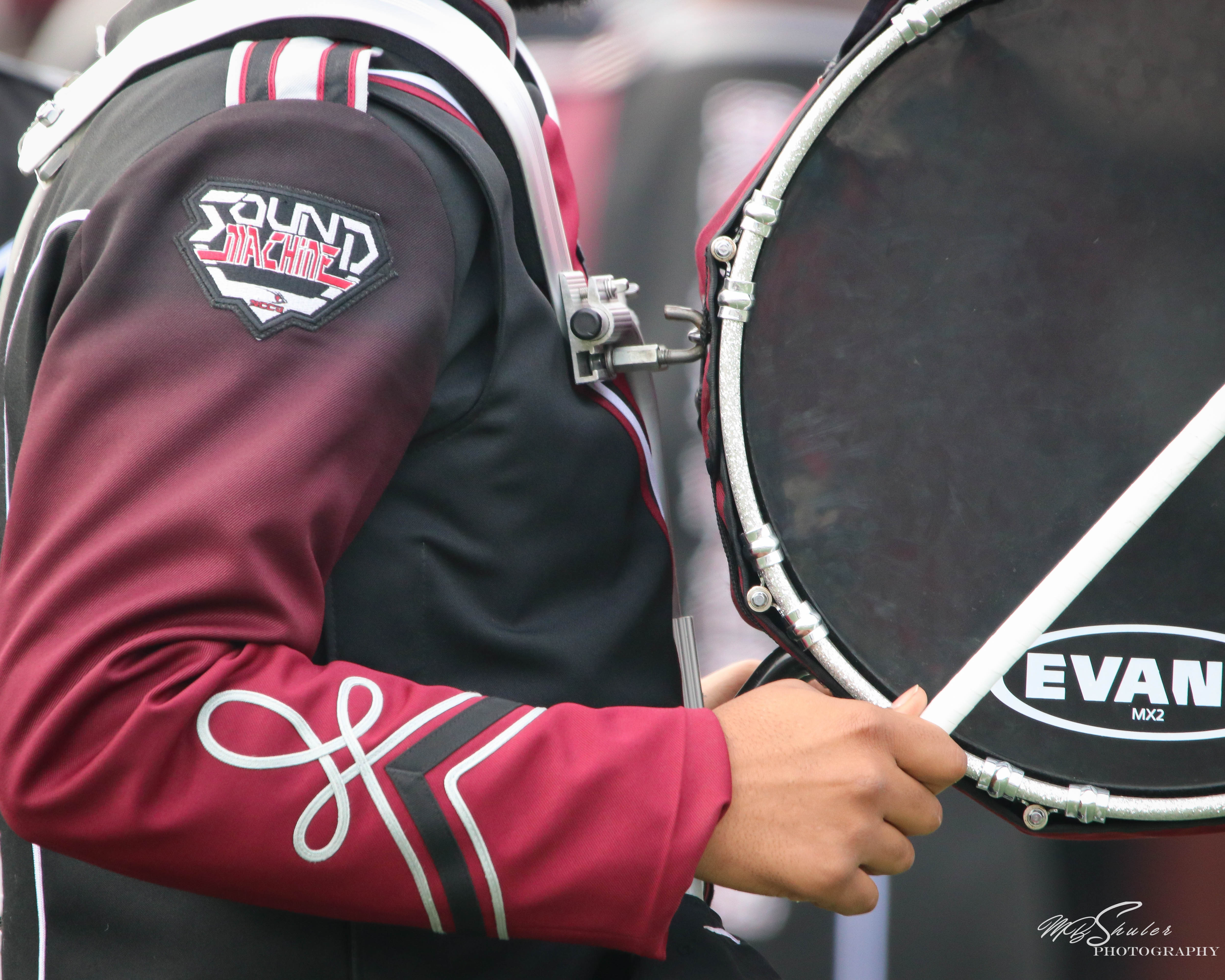
The Marching Sound Machine in 2019

The Marching Sound Machine contains numerous woodwind, brass, percussion, and auxiliary members, divided into section which are run by their respective section leaders. woodwind instruments include clarinets, piccolos, and saxophones sections. The brass instruments consists of the trumpet, mellophone, trombone, baritone, and sousaphone sections. The percussion section contains snare, tenor and bass drums; in addition to cymbal players. Members of the band's auxiliary units include the drum majors, Color guard, and dancers

== Marching style ==
As is the style commonly found in HBCU bands, The Sound Machine utilizes a variation of the high step marching style. This involves the lifting of the knee with legs directly in front, thighs parallel to the ground, and toes pointed downward. When the leg is elevated, there should be a 90-degree angle with the body and the thigh, and a 90-degree angle with the thigh and the shin. The leg is then lowered, and this is repeated with the other leg. This is informally referred to as the "chair step".

== Notable Performances ==
- 1960 Inauguration of the Governor of North Carolina
- 1961 New York Giants vs Dallas Cowboys Halftime in Yankee Stadium
- 2005 Honda Battle of the Bands
- 2006 Honda Battle of the Bands
- 2007 Honda Battle of the Bands
- 2008 Honda Battle of the Bands
- 2009 Honda Battle of the Bands
- 2010 Honda Battle of the Bands
- 2011 Rose Parade
