= University of Montana Grizzly Marching Band =

College marching band in Missoula, Montana

- School: University of Montana; Montana Grizzlies
- Location: Missoula, MT
- Conference: Big Sky Conference
- Founded: 19th Century
- Director: Dr. Kevin Griggs
- Members: 140
- Fight song: "Up with Montana"
- Website: Grizzly Marching Band

The University of Montana Grizzly Marching Band is the school band of the University of Montana. As of 2017, the band had about 130 members.

== Program ==
The band started in the late 1800s. It largely specializes in contemporary corps-style outdoor marching, playing at every home game. Until 2024, the band traveled to Bozeman for the Brawl of the Wild football rivalry against Montana State University. The group has accompanied the football team to four Division I-AA / Football Championship Subdivision National Championships. In addition to the game-day entertainment, it makes several appearances in the community each season.
