= Corps style band =

Type of marching band

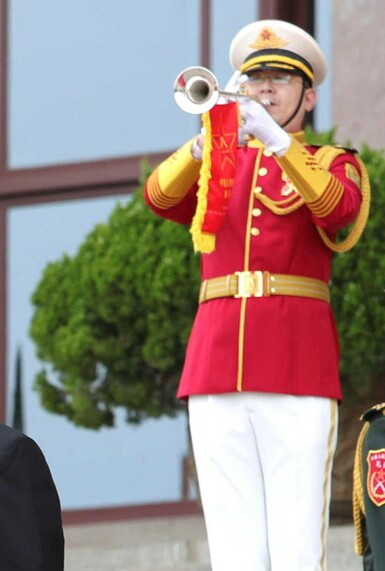
A state fanfare trumpeter of the PLA National Marching Band, which is considered to be a Corps style band.

A Corps style band is a type of marching band based on those of Drum Corps International. Notable differences include the introduction of the roll step, backwards marching and sliding, and the "8 to 5" step size.

== History ==
The corps style of marching stems from a rich American military history of marching bands. Following the Civil War, many musicians from the North and the South returned home and formed community bands. These proliferated in many American towns for decades, and served as a focal point for local festivals. Following World War I, the VFW and the American Legion began sponsoring their own bands for local parades and performances. These groups grew in size and scope to where competitions were held locally, regionally, and finally nationally.

When the Drum Corps Associates (DCA) was formed in 1965 and later Drum Corps International (DCI) in 1972, the performances and level of creativity began to dramatically change from the traditional military style. During this time, step sizes were altered from a "6 to 5" ratio (six steps to five yards) to an "8 to 5" (eight steps to five yards). Instead of a constant forward marching, groups would "stand fast" or "mark time" to music, maintaining specific forms. Backwards marching, as well as a Traverse march (sliding side to side) was incorporated into the marching style during this time.

Through the 1960s the American high school and college bands marched primarily in a military style. However, following the trends set forth by drum corps, many college and high school bands began to incorporate the drum corps elements into their style. The 8 to 5 stride became widely accepted in the late 1970s. During this time marching bells, xylophone, and even marching tympani were added to the field.

The 1980s saw increased movement by American high schools to utilize the corps style of marching rather than the military style. This is most likely due to the fact that the corps style allowed for a much broader selection of musical styles, tempos, and moods, versus the limitations of the traditional military march. Another important factor is that the Corps Style bands face the audience, versus the military bands primarily facing the end zones, therefore, the corps style band has a much fuller sound, and is generally louder. The 1980s also saw the movement away from strict 8 to 5 step size to the usage of a constantly changing step size.

With the addition of new musical elements, the 1980s also saw the addition of the "Front Ensemble" or "Pit", a derivation of the orchestra pit used for ballet and opera. In marching band, the pit is used to incorporate keyboard percussion such as xylophone, marimba, and vibraphone, as well as other color percussion instruments such as tympani, cymbals, hand drums, drum set, and tambourine.

The 1990s observed increased usage of dance with the color guard, more usage of props and backdrops, increased usage of pit percussion, and generally an increase of the physical demands of the band members. Faster tempos of music were incorporated into corps style shows. Electronics were also incorporated into the corps style via the pit. Electronics are used for amplifying soloists, or as synthesized sounds effects or instrument voices in the arrangements.

== Similar styles ==
During the 1970s, several styles were derived from the corps style, including "Patterns in Motion" which was pioneered by Bill Moffit, then band director at the University of Houston, and later Purdue University. The Patterns in Motion style includes mostly symmetrical forms, gate swings, pinwheels, etc. Generally, the style maintains a fixed 8 to 5 stride but can include altered step sizes to accommodate maneuvers such as pinwheels. This style also maintained a military-style "high step", where the feet are brought straight up to the knee before being pushed forward for a step.

Another similar style developed in the 70s is the "show band" style, which incorporates similar gate swings, pinwheels, and such from the patterns in motion style. Generally, the show band style includes more standing time, and more movement to a drumbeat or cadence, instead of while marching to the music of the winds. The music selection for show bands is often more popular music.

In modern times the show band style still is fairly popular around the country. Although one may observe patterns in motion movement during a show, it is generally not utilized for an entire performance.

Even within the show band style, there are significant variations. There tends to be a style more geared towards African American traditions, and can be observed in bands from schools such as Grambling State University, Texas Southern University, or the fictitious college from the film Drumline. This variation features more standing time, while band members dance and entertain the spectators. Often, musical elements from this variation of show band incorporate contemporary popular music and traditional rhythm and blues. Many of these bands maintain a twirling line, as well as a dance line instead of a color guard.

The other major derivation of show band can be observed in bands such as the University of Texas, or Ohio State University. Although one could argue that both these bands have such rich and longstanding traditions which predate the formation of drum corps, they could be considered a style unto themselves. However, these bands serve more as the foundation of the show band style, not as its ultimate evolution. These types of show bands are also more interested in crowd entertainment, and typically change their field show (music and drill) every other week. They generally have a theme for each show but derive their musical selection from a variety of sources such as traditional marches, symphonic, film scores, jazz, or popular music. These types of bands feature mostly playing while marching with only a limited amount of stand fast time.

== Stylistic differences ==
Where the military style is usually a constant forward march, it may incorporate an abrupt turn (known as a face turn) or an about face. The corps style incorporates forward, backward, and side to side marching. The military bands generally always face an end zone, where the corps bands generally face the main audience (home side press box), but can face backfield or other directions for specific effect. The military style uses a strict "6 to 5" foot stride, where corps style generally has a constant altered step size.

A significant break from the military tradition used in the corps style is instead of baton twirlers, there is a color guard which uses flags in their routines, as well as rifles and sabres. In military bands twirlers march the same drill as the band members do, where the color guard in a corps band is generally a separate unit, doing their own drill and routine. Color guard members also may incorporate dance movement. If a military unit has flags, they are generally not spun, and the same silk is used throughout the show, where a color guard will use multiple designs for silks during the show, as well as rifle and sabre.

Musically, military bands perform marches. The corps style can incorporate any or multiple styles of music to fit the theme of their show. Corps style bands can utilize props and backdrops to enhance the theatrical quality of their show, whereas military bands generally don't have a theme for their shows.

== Instrumentation ==
The corps style marching band contains the traditional military band instrumentation with the addition of other concert instruments and percussion.

- Woodwinds:
  - Piccolo
  - Flute
  - Clarinet
  - Bass clarinet
  - Alto saxophone
  - Tenor saxophone
  - Baritone saxophone
- Brass:
  - Trumpet
  - Cornet
  - Mellophone (French horn)
  - Trombone
  - Tenor horn
  - Baritone tuba/euphonium
  - Marching baritone
  - Sousaphone
  - Helicon
  - Contrabass bugle
- Battery percussion (marches with winds):
  - Snare drums
  - Multiple multi-tenors (quads/quints)
  - Multiple single tenors (bands with Philippine/Indonesian tradition)
  - Multiple bass drums
  - Cymbals
  - Marching glockenspiel (bands with Indonesian/Latin American tradition)
  - Marching marimba (bands with Guatemalan Latin American tradition)
- Pit percussion (stationary, usually on sideline):
  - Bells (glockenspiel)
  - Xylophone
  - Vibraphone
  - Marimba
  - Chimes
  - Crotales
  - Timpani
  - Triangle
  - Tambourine
  - Drum kit
  - Congas
  - Shakers
- Other:
  - Oboe
  - Bassoon (usually not marched, but as featured soloists in the pit)
  - Synthesizer (used in pit for sound effects or color instruments, piano, harp, celesta, etc.)
- Color guard:
  - Flag
  - Rifle
  - Sabre
  - Props

== Drumline ==
The development of the corps style of marching has brought about new equipment for drum-lines. In the 1970s and 1980s, specific drum harnesses were developed to accommodate marching with a set of bells, a single fiberglass timpani, or a xylophone. These types of harnesses are also used for snares, tenors (quads/quints), and bass drums, a significant upgrade to the traditional cloth sling. Multiple sizes of bass drums are often used for corps style bands, with the bass drums playing melodic or "moving" parts (similar to a hand bell choir) rather than a traditional military bass drum keeping a steady beat.

== See also ==
- Scramble band — another style of marching band
