= Durand (surname) =

Durand, du Rand or du Randt is a surname of French origin. It ultimately derives from the Latin omen name Durandus, meaning "enduring". Notable people with the surname include:

- André Durand (1947–2024), Canadian painter
- Angèle Durand (1925–2001), Belgian singer and actress
- Anthony Durand (1956–2009), American potter
- Alain Durand (born 1967), French footballer
- Asher Brown Durand (1796–1886), American painter
- Auguste Durand (1830–1909), French organist, publisher, and composer
- Bernice Durand (1942–2022), American physicist
- Carlos Durand (1826-1904), the namesake of the Hospital Durand in Buenos Aires, Argentina
- Christophe Durand (born 1973), French table tennis player
- Claude Durand (1938–2015), French publisher, translator, and writer
- Cora Durand (1902–1998), American potter
- David Durand (historian) (1680–1763), Huguenot French and English minister and historian
- David Durand (actor) (1920–1998), American actor
- Dimitri Durand (born 1982), French footballer
- Earl Durand (1913–1939), American outlaw
- Edmé-Antoine Durand (1768–1835), French diplomat and art collector
- Elias Durand (1794–1873), American pharmacist and botanist
- Elias Judah Durand (1870–1922), American mycologist and botanist
- Estienne Durand (1586–1618), French poet
- Florentin Durand (born 1982), French ski jumper
- Frank Durand (1895–1978), American politician
- Frédérik Durand (born 1988), Canadian DJ
- George Du Rand (born 1982), South African swimmer
- George F. Durand (1850–1889), Canadian architect
- George H. Durand (1838–1903), American politician
- Georges-Mathieu de Durand (died 1997), Canadian monk
- Gilbert Durand (1921–2012), French academic
- Gilles Durand (born 1952), Canadian former cyclist
- Ginette Durand (1929–2018), French gymnast
- Godefroy Durand (1832–1896), French illustrator
- Grace Durand (1867–1948), American clubwoman, business owner, and temperance activist
- Gregory Durand (born 1977), French short track speed skater
- Guillaume Durand (1230–1296), French canonist and liturgist
- Hélène Durand (1883–1934), Belgian botanical illustrator
- Henry Marion Durand (1812–1871), British Indian Army officer and colonial administrator
- Sir Henry Mortimer Durand (1850–1924), British diplomat and civil servant in British India
- Henry R. Durand (1855–1932), businessman
- Henry Strong Durand (1861–1929), American medical doctor and philanthropist
- Hippolyte Durand (1801–1882), French architect
- Jacky Durand (born 1967), French professional cyclist
- Jacques Durand (1920–2009), French engineer and automobile designer
- Jacques Durand (publisher) (1865–1928), French music publisher and composer
- James Durand (1775–1833), businessman and political figure in Upper Canada
- Jean Durand (director) (1882–1946), French screenwriter and film director
- Jean Durand (politician) (1865-1936), French politician
- Jean-Marie Durand (born 1940), French Assyriologist
- Jean-Nicolas-Louis Durand (1760–1834), French author, teacher and architect
- Jean-Philippe Durand (born 1960), French footballer
- Joël-François Durand (born 1954), French composer
- Johann Durand (born 1981), French football player
- John Durand (MP, died 1788) (1719–1788)
- John Hodsdon Durand (1761–1830)
- José Durand Laguna (1885–1965), Argentine footballer and manager
- Julien Durand (disambiguation), several
- Kevin Durand (born 1974), Canadian actor
- Laurent Durand (1712–1763), French publisher
- Léopold Durand (1666–1746), French architect
- Lorenzo T. Durand (1849–1917), American lawyer and politician
- Manon Durand (born 1998), French canoeist
- Marguerite Durand (1864–1936), French stage actress, journalist, and suffragette
- Marie Durand (1711–1776), French Protestant
- Martín Durand (born 1976), Argentine rugby union player
- Os du Randt (born 1972), South African rugby player
- Peter Durand (1766–1822), British inventor of the tin can
- Pierre Durand (disambiguation), several
- Raymond Durand (1786–1837), French diplomat
- Raymond Durand (politician) (1945–2025), French politician
- Raymond Durand (rally driver) (born 1952), French rally driver
- Salty du Rand (1926–1979), South African rugby player
- Ursin Durand (1682–1771), French monk and historian
- William F. Durand (1859–1958), American aeronautical engineer
- Luc Durand (1929-2018), Quebec Architect and Urbanist

== See also ==
- Durant (surname)
- Durand (disambiguation)
- Randt
