= Virginia Duran =

Tiwa micaceous potter

Virginia Duran (1904 – 1998), was a Tiwa micaceous potter and educator from Picuris Pueblo. She was notable for her work as an educator to preserve the centuries of Picuris Pueblo's pottery traditions, and for the artistry of her ceramics.

== Biography ==
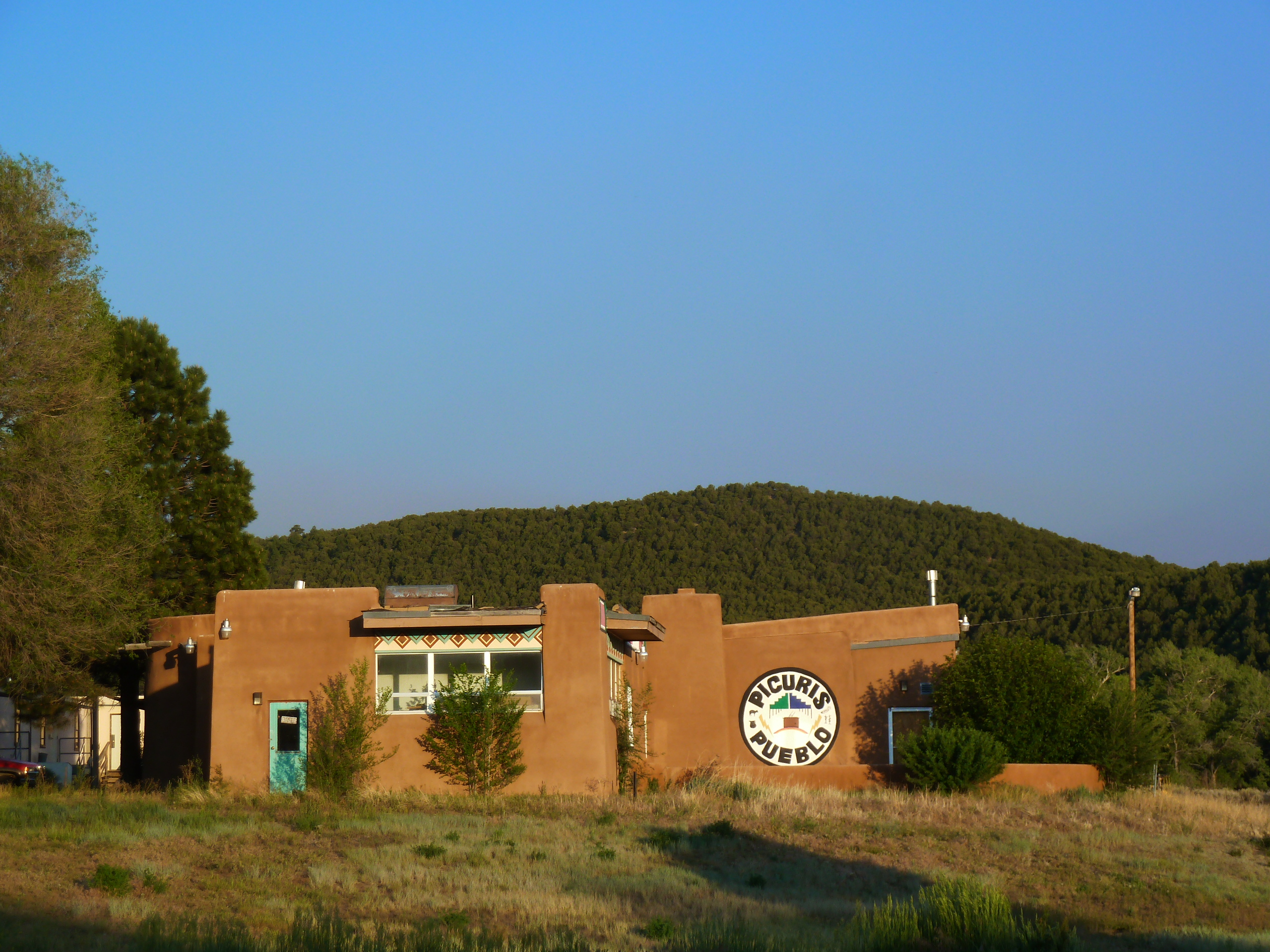
Contemporary image of Picuris Pueblo

Virginia Duran was born in 1904 in Picuris Pueblo, a member of the Tiwa tribe.

=== Picuris pottery and revival ===
The tradition of Picuris Pueblo pottery dates back to the 1600s. It is made with locally mined mica-rich clay, giving the pieces a glittery sheen. The pieces are fired at a low temperature, making the resulting pottery particularly durable and well adapted for baking and cooking use.

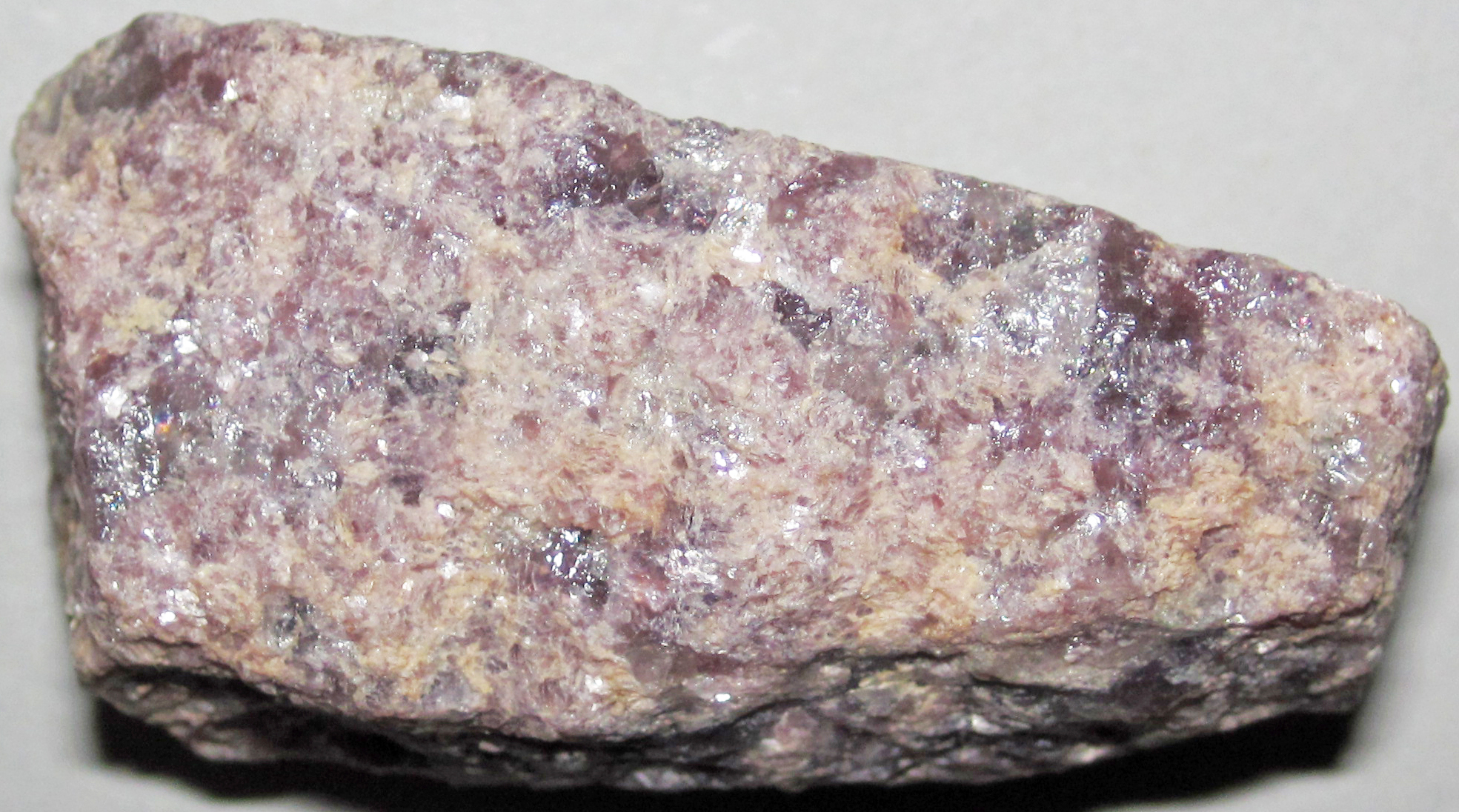
Rose muscovite collected in the Picuris Mountains. The stone's mica inclusions are characteristic of those found in the area's substrates that give Picuris pottery its traditional sheen.

When Pueblo pottery began to be collected by the tourist trade in the 1950s, wares from Picuris Pueblo tended to be left behind. Due to the pottery's versatility as cooking ware, the works were considered utilitarian and rarely collected, as collectors were drawn to more artisanal Native American pieces such as the black pottery of Santa Clara Pueblo. As a result, traditional Picuris Pueblo pottery was becoming more difficult to find as few potters practiced the art. When concerns were raised that the art would be lost, Virginia Duran was one of the traditional potters who was integral to preserving the distinctive micaceous pottery tradition of Picuris Pueblo.

=== Art style ===
Duran became particularly notable amongst Picuris Pueblo potters for adding additional mica slip to her pots before firing, creating a result that enhanced the clay's glittery properties. The result would leave a golden finish on her designs. Virginia Duran described her work as a potter, "Pots of ours, its very handy in any way. Making pottery too is sacred". Duran sought to create pieces that were not "just for pretty", they had to be both beautiful and functional.

=== Educator ===
In the 1960s, Duran began holding demonstrations on how to create Picuris pottery, teaching learners to craft vessels and how to apply her signature slip. Later, she became a supervisor of the Picuris Pueblo's Arts and Crafts program, which taught traditional crafts to interested learners in the pueblo.

== Legacy ==
Duran's teaching would inspire further artists who would craft pottery in the style of Picuris Pueblo, specifically Taos potter Virginia T. Romero and Anthony Durand.

The contributions of traditional potters Maria Ramita Simbola Martinez, Cora Durand and Virginia Duran towards preserving the tradition of Picuris Pueblo pottery is commemorated with a New Mexico Roadside Marker, found in Taos County on U.S. Route 75 at Indian Road, Mile Marker 11.5.

== Collections ==
- Pot, 1958. Hood Museum of Art, Dartmouth College
