= Yale Precision Marching Band =

Official marching band of Yale University

Yale Precision Marching Band YPMB, The Band
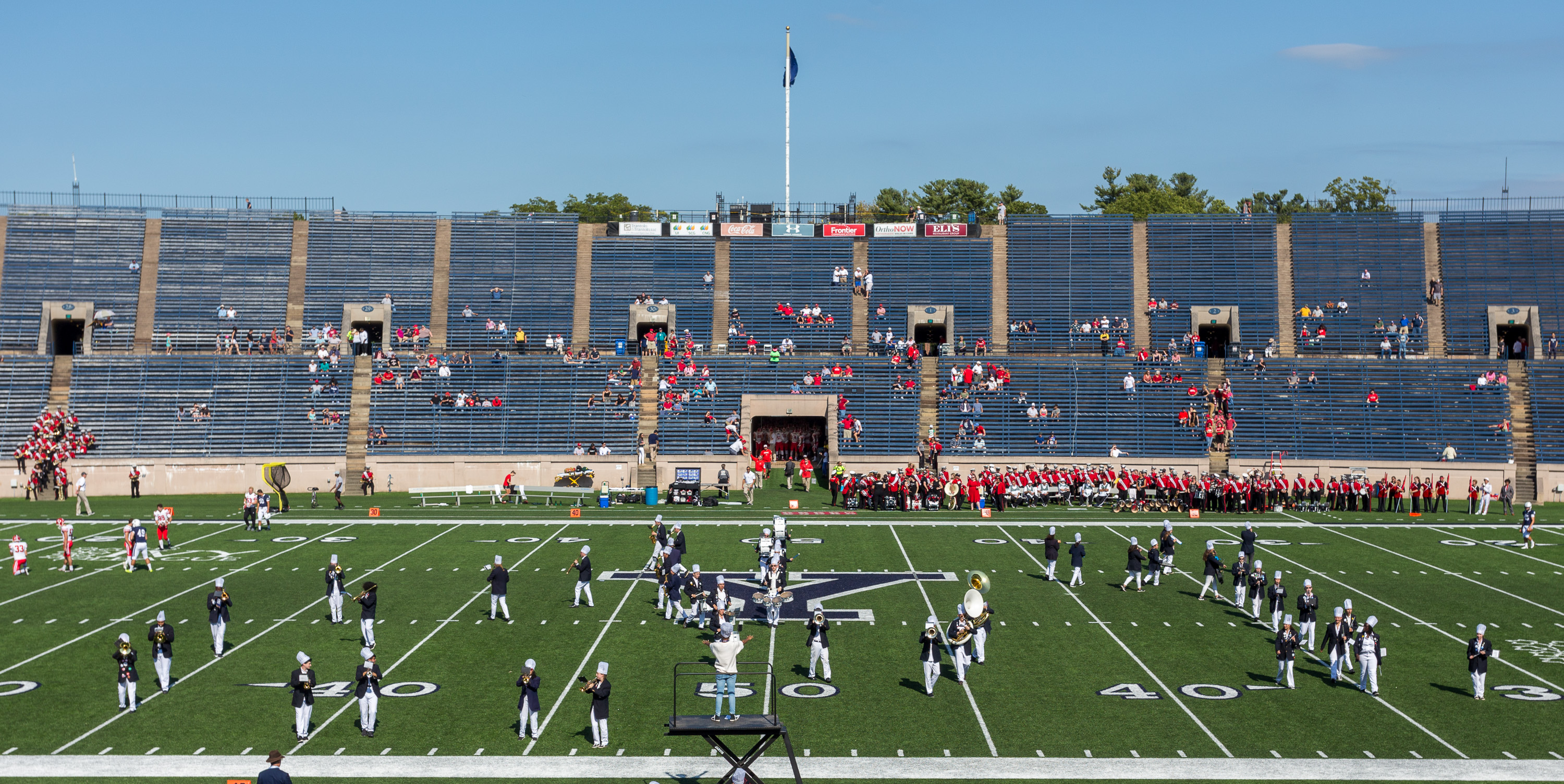
- At Yale Bowl in 2019
- School: Yale University
- Location: New Haven, CT
- Conference: Ivy League
- Founded: 1917
- Director: Thomas C. Duffy
- Members: 85
- Fight song: "Bulldog, Down the Field"
- Website: Yale Precision Marching Band

The Yale Precision Marching Band (affectionately known as the YPMB, or more simply The Band, for short) is the official marching band of Yale University. It is a scatter band (what some peers might call a "scramble band"), as distinct from university marching bands that emphasize precise movements and geometric field formations. Band members refer to themselves as "The Members Of...", which is derived from their introduction at Yale events.

== About the Band ==
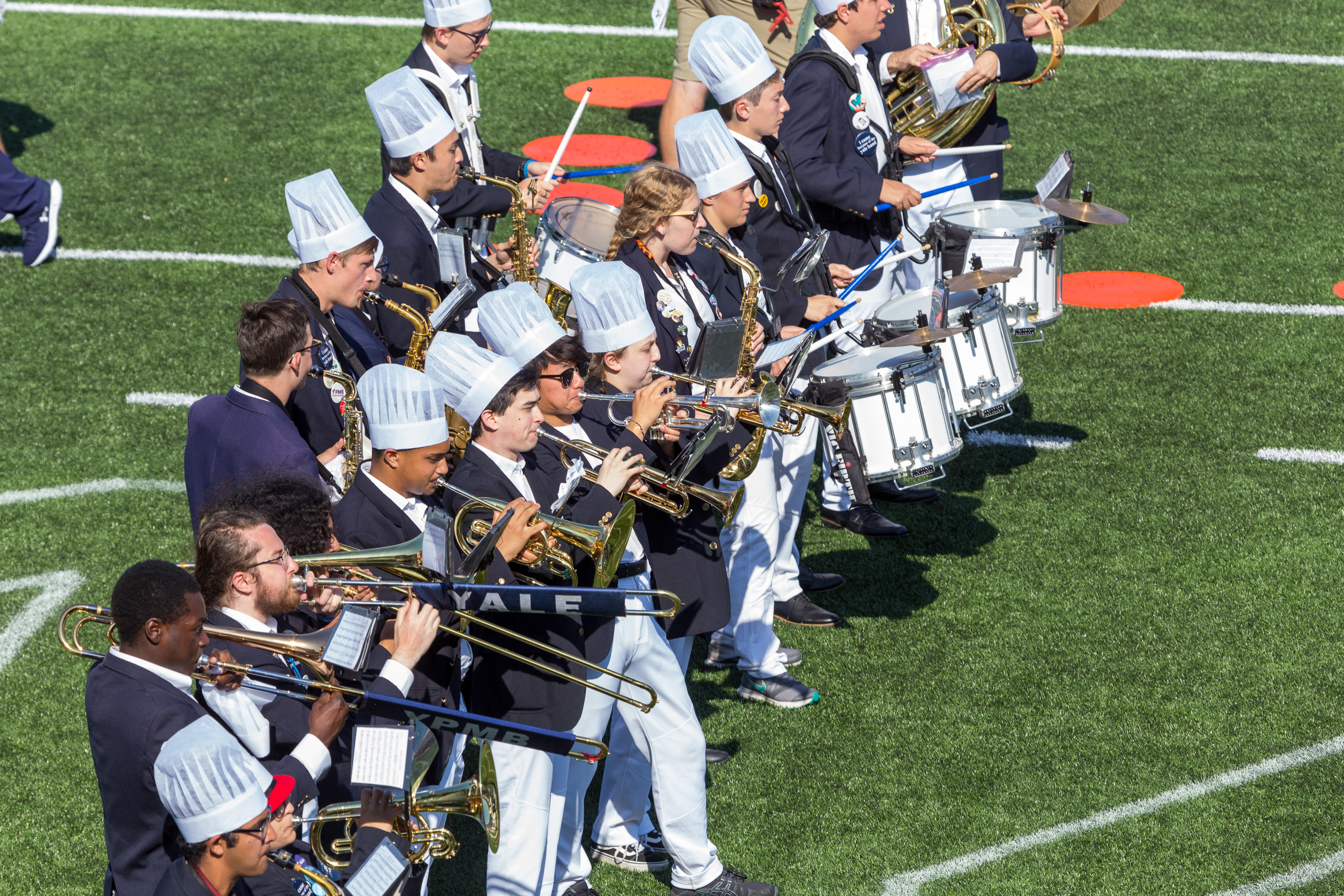
Wearing chef hats

Aside from Director Thomas C. Duffy and Business Manager Stephanie Theodos Hubbard, the band is largely student-run.

- The Drum Major conducts the band during rehearsals and at games.
- The Manager works closely with the Drum Major to organize performances and events on-and-off campus and ensure the well-being of the group.
- The Social Chair plans social gatherings and bonding events for the band outside of performances. They work to create a comfortable environment for everyone in the band.
- The Media Specialist documents the band's adventures through photos and videos. They post photos of the band on Facebook and they have control over the band's Twitter, Instagram, and TikTok.
- The Equipment Manager is responsible for coordinating the logistics, maintenance, and setup of all band gear during football games in the fall season.
- The band consists of five sections, the leaders of which assist the Drum Major and Manager in the running of the band. They also lead sectionals and provide section morale.
- The Announcer announces and performs the halftime shows during football games, and works closely with Mark Ryba, the play-by-play announcer for Yale football.
Überprops

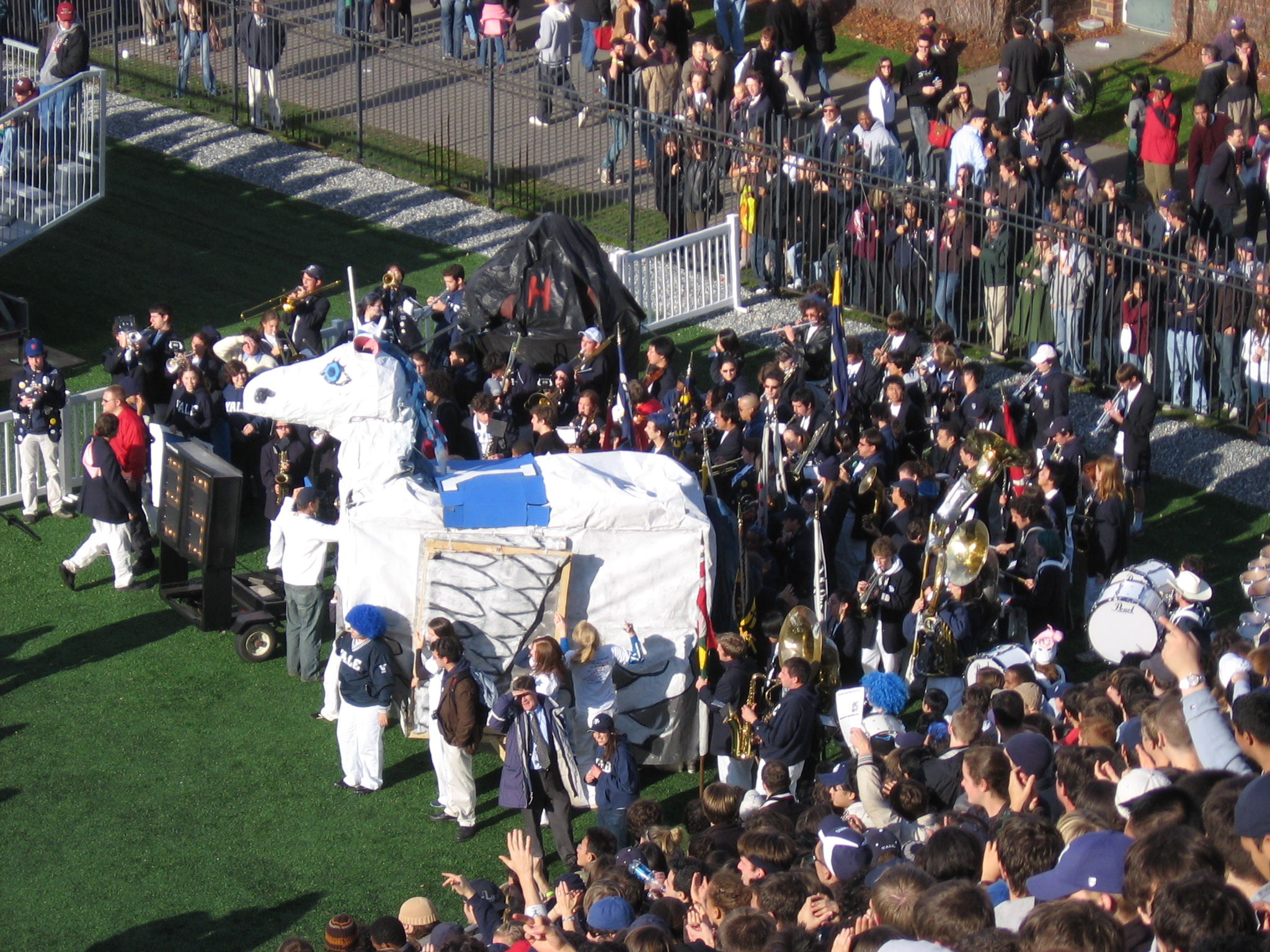
Überprop "Peggy" at The Game 2006 (wings folded)

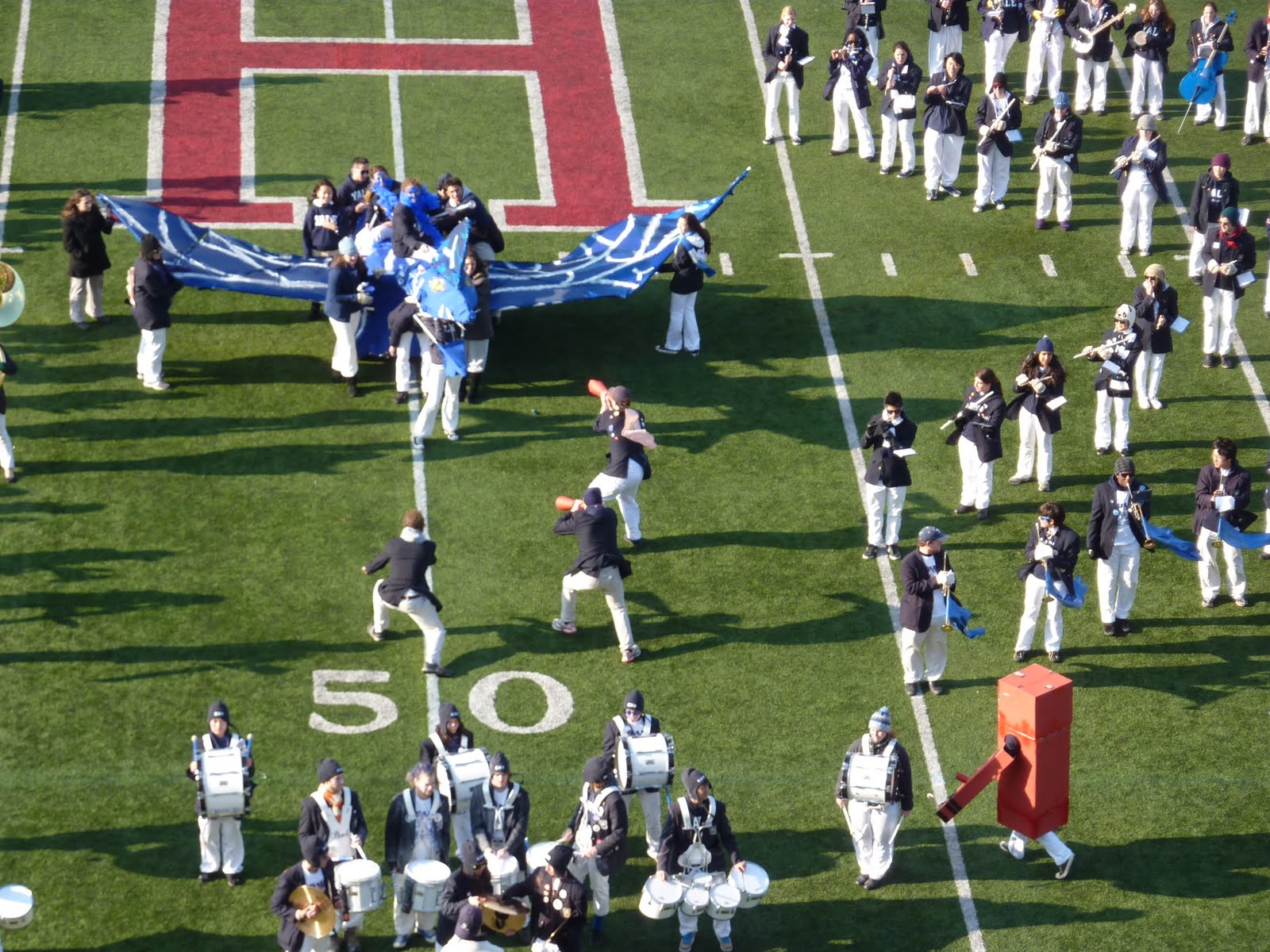
Überprop "Dmitri" at The Game 2010 (in attack position)

== Notable stunts ==
In October 1985, six YPMB members were suspended after dropping their pants at halftime during the Yale-Holy Cross game. Only one week earlier, the band was forbidden by West Point officials from performing its halftime show during the Army-Yale game for the script's insinuation that certain government officials were communists. The following season, in the Yale-Army game at New Haven, the YPMB took the unusual step of marching in straight lines for several minutes before breaking into its usual scatter formations. (NYT 10/7/86, B4) Before the band left the field, members removed their blue blazers on the field, spelling out "USA."

== Repertoire ==
- Bulldog, Eli Yale words and music by Cole Porter (class of 1913)
- Bright College Years (the unofficial alma mater of Yale University) words by Henry Durand in 1881 to the music of Die Wacht am Rhein
- Down the Field (march two step) words by Stanleigh P. Friedman; arranged by G.L. Atwater, Jr.; published in 1905 by the Chas H. Loomis Company (New Haven, CT)
- Yale Boola, Boola (march) words and music by A. M. Hirsh; arranged by G. L. Jr. Atwater; Original Copyright 1906 by Leo Feist
- Yale College Life words by T. Herbert Reed; arranged by J.C. Heed; Original Copyright: 1903 By: Reed, Dawson & Co.
- Sons of Yale: Here's to Good Old Yale Alternative title March Blue arranged by JL Lake; Original Copyright: 1917 by Carl Fischer

The repertoire also includes scores or hundreds of songs arranged by students.
