= Run for Your Life (TV series) =

American drama television series (1965–1968)

- Title screen
- Genre: Drama
- Created by: Roy Huggins
- Starring: Ben Gazzara
- Theme music composer: Pete Rugolo
- Composer: Pete Rugolo
- Country of origin: United States
- Original language: English
- No. of seasons: 3
- No. of episodes: 86 (all in color), in addition to pilot

Production
- Executive producer: Roy Huggins
- Producers: Robert Hamner; Gordon Hessler; Jo Swerling, Jr.
- Running time: 45–48 min
- Production company: Roncom Films

Original release
- Network: NBC
- Release: September 13, 1965 – March 27, 1968

Run for Your Life is an American drama television series starring Ben Gazzara as a man with only a short time to live. It ran on NBC from 1965 to 1968. The series was created by Roy Huggins, who had previously explored the "man on the move" concept with The Fugitive.

== Synopsis ==
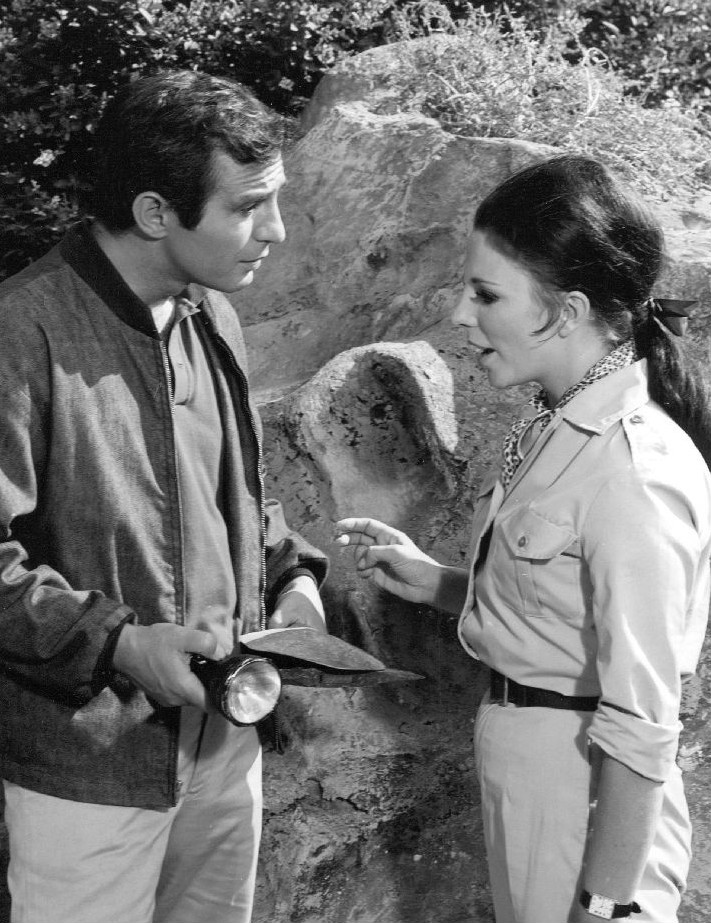
Gazzara as Paul Bryan with guest star Joan Collins.

=== Premise ===
Ben Gazzara played attorney Paul Bryan. When his doctor tells him he will die in no less than 9 months, but in no more than 18 months, he decides to do all the things for which he had never had the time—to squeeze 30 years of living into one or two years of life. Much like Route 66, each episode features the main character on the move, encountering new people in new situations.

=== Background ===
Gazzara originated the character of Paul Bryan on Kraft Suspense Theatre, in the episode "Rapture at Two-Forty," which aired on April 15, 1965, and served as the show's pilot. Well received, the show became a series that September. Near the beginning of that episode, the audience actually sees the conversation between Bryan and his doctor, which is heard only in voice-over in subsequent episodes of Run For Your Life. Although Bryan's doctor gave him no more than 18 months to live, the series ran for three seasons, with 86 hour-long episodes, all filmed in color.

== Episodes ==
Overview of Run for Your Life seasons
Season	Episodes	Originally released		Timeslot (ET)
Season	Episodes	First released	Last released	Timeslot (ET)
0	TBA	April 15, 1965		TBA
1	30	September 13, 1965	May 16, 1966	TBA
2	30	September 12, 1966	April 24, 1967	TBA
3	26	September 13, 1967	March 27, 1968	TBA

=== Pilot (Kraft Suspense Theatre, 1965) ===
No. overall	No. in season	Title	Directed by	Written by	Original release date
Pilot	Pilot	"Rapture at Two-Forty"	William Graham	Story by : Jo Swerling Jr. Teleplay by : Luther Davis	April 15, 1965
The pilot for Run for Your Life, broadcast as an episode of Kraft Suspense Theatre. After being diagnosed with an incurable disease and being given only a short time to live, lawyer Paul Bryan (Ben Gazzara) decides to spend his days associating with the jet set on the French Riviera. Also starring Katherine Crawford, Michael Rennie, Antoinette Bower, Stella Garcia, S. John Launer, Louis Mercier, Miguel Landa, and Marcel Hillaire.

=== Season 1 (1965–1966) ===
No. overall	No. in season	Title	Directed by	Written by	Original release date
1	1	"The Cold, Cold War of Paul Bryan"	Robert Butler & Leslie H. Martinson	Story by : "John Thomas James"; Teleplay by : Frank Fenton & "John Thomas James"	September 13, 1965
While snowed in at an expensive ski resort, Paul seeks to impress a young woman named Laura Beaumont (Katharine Ross) and becomes involved in a tense card game with General Carlos Portaz (Robert Loggia), a Latin American dictator. Other guest stars: Stephen McNally, Celeste Holm, Eric Braeden, Ned Romero, Jacques Bergerac, Jacqueline Beer, Carl Esmond, Ted Knight, and Mary Lawrence.
2	2	"The Girl Next Door Is a Spy"	Leslie H. Martinson	Story by : "John Thomas James"; Teleplay by : Luther Davis	September 20, 1965
In West Berlin, Paul spots an old girlfriend, Ellen Henderson (Diana Hyland), and inadvertently gets involved in Cold War spying intrigue. Other guest stars: Macdonald Carey, Robert Knapp, Britt Semand, Walter Friedel, Walter Janowitz, and Maya Van Horn.
3	3	"Someone Who Makes Me Feel Beautiful"	Leslie H. Martinson	Story by : Judith & Robert Guy Barrows; Teleplay by : Robert Guy Barrows	September 27, 1965
For different reasons, two men vie for the love of beautiful, but lonely, divorcee Jessica Braden (Tippi Hedren). Other guest stars: Fernando Lamas, Henry Beckman, Maureen Leeds, Alex Montoya, and Mark Miranda.
4	4	"Never Pick Up a Stranger"	Leslie H. Martinson	Story by : "John Thomas James"; Teleplay by : Howard Browne	October 11, 1965
in the southwestern United States, Paul is arrested after Kathy Sloan (Brenda Scott), an attractive and seemingly innocent but troubled teenage girl he picked up hitchhiking, is injured jumping from his car, which forces him to deal with the town's brutal Sheriff Trumbell (Barry Sullivan), who orders him out of town. Other guest stars: George Mitchell, Vaughn Taylor, Russell Thorson, Len Wayland , Paul Newlan, Gregg Palmer, Michael Stanwood, and Don Brodie.
5	5	"How to Sell Your Soul for Fun and Profit"	Steve Previn	Story by : "John Thomas James"; Teleplay by : Frank Fenton & "John Thomas James"	October 18, 1965
Paul unites with fellow race-car drivers to help a woman named Marika Takacs (Gia Scala) whose brother Janos Takacs (Eric Braeden) was imprisoned in a country behind the Iron Curtain after he toasted Paul — and simply because he also repeated a toast Paul made to the United States. Other guest stars: Telly Savalas, Jeremy Slate, and David Lewis.
6	6	"Our Man in Limbo"	Leslie H. Martinson	Story by : "John Thomas James"; Teleplay by : "Paul Tuckahoe"	October 25, 1965
While working under orders from American intelligence and looking for proof that a charming friend is actually an enemy agent, Paul crash-lands in the Sahara Desert. Guest stars: Macdonald Carey and Janine Gray.
7	7	"Where Mystery Begins"	Leslie H. Martinson	"John Thomas James"	November 1, 1965
Paul reluctantly agrees to attorney Martin Shawe′s (Keith Andes) request that he defend Shawe′s client, Louise Brode (Dana Wynter) — a confessed murderess accused of killing her husband — even though Paul believes that she is guilty. Other guest stars: Cyril Delevanti, Ian Wolfe, Walter Brooke, and Booth Colman.
8	8	"The Savage Season"	Richard Benedict	Story by : "John Thomas James"; Teleplay by : Frank Fenton	November 8, 1965
Paul helps out airline stewardess Judy Collins (Jill Haworth), who has been transporting mob money to Switzerland and becomes their target after they accuse her of stealing money. Other guest stars: Gene Evans, Harold J. Stone, Lyle Talbot, Henry Silva, Leslie Perkins, Quinn O'Hara, and Leslie Summers.
9	9	"This Town for Sale"	Richard Benedict	Story by : Chester Krumholz; Teleplay by : George Kirgo	November 15, 1965
After Paul's car breaks down in a small community, he is accused of murder by the town's police chief, Jim Holland (James Whitmore), who is eager to please Edward Loomis (R.G. Armstrong), father of the victim and the town's main employer. Other guest stars: Mary Ann Mobley, Sharon Hugueny, Paul Fix, and Anthony Hayes.
10	10	"A Girl Named Sorrow"	Leslie H. Martinson	Judith & Robert Guy Barrows	November 22, 1965
The search for a Nazi war criminal (David Opatoshu) brings concentration camp survivor Lisa Sorrow (Ina Balin) and Paul together and culminates in a confrontation in the Arizona desert. Also guest-stars Eric Braeden.
11	11	"The Voice of Gina Milan"	William Hale	Story by : Philip Saltzman; Teleplay by : John W. Bloch & Philip Saltzman	November 29, 1965
In Paris, Paul meets Gina Milan (Susan Strasberg), a frightened, pretty young opera singer who asks Paul for protection so she can put on a performance after a quarrel with her teacher — and whose romance with Paul leads to heartbreak. Other guest stars: Renzo Cesana, Frances Fong, Vinton Hayworth, Michele Montau, Yuki Tani, Linda Watkins, and Al Checco.
12	12	"The Time of the Sharks"	Leslie H. Martinson	Story by : "John Thomas James"; Teleplay by : Frank Fenton	December 6, 1965
On a small island in Tahiti, Paul meets Hardie and Elizabeth Rankin (Howard Keel and Dolores Dorn-Heft), a couple with marital difficulties who invites him to go shark fishing. During the fishing trip, they encounter a group of beatniks who claim that they are photographers and that fishing will disrupt their work. The beatniks risk their lives by diving in the shark-infested waters for mysterious reasons, and a shark kills one of them. Eventually, the story of Paul and his illness inspire the disillusioned people around him. Other guest stars: Tony Bill, Melodie Johnson, Steve Carlson, and Bernie Hamilton.
13	13	"Make the Angels Weep"	Leslie H. Martinson	Story by : "John Thomas James"; Teleplay by : John T. Dugan	December 13, 1965
Paul returns to his home town to clear his runaway friend of a murder charge by finding the real murderer, and has trouble dealing with the victim's mother, Mrs. Fielding (Anne Seymour) and unfaithful wife Rosinha Fielding (Carol Lawrence), both of whom he remembers. Also guest starring Alberto Morin.
14	14	"Journey into Yesterday"	Richard Benedict	Teleplay by : Lou Shaw; Based on a story by : Marc Norman	December 27, 1965
While searching the jungles of New Guinea (or Africa, according to some sources) for the son of Judge Haines, the man who helped raise Paul after the death of Paul's father, Paul and his guide Carl Hague (James Forrest) — an alcohol-loving newspaperman and former boxer from Australia — are captured by a primitive tribe after Hague kills one of the tribe's children. The tribespeople want to kill Hague in retribution, but Hague claims to have a wife and three children while Paul has only a short time left to live. A duel of justice ensues over whether Paul should offer his own life to the tribe to save Hague's. Other guest stars: Harold Fong, and Ken Renard.
15	15	"Strangers at the Door"	Stuart Rosenberg	Tom Allen	January 3, 1966
Forced to abandon his car in a small town in the southwestern United States, Paul hops aboard a freight train and meets an angry young man named Bret (Robert Drivas) who feels he is an outcast and resents the world. Paul soon joins Bret in a fight against two hobos — and is instrumental in changing Bret's life. Other guest stars: Lynn Carey, George Chandler, Kelly Corcoran, Trevor Bardette, Jim Boles, Zara Cully, John Francis, Billy M. Greene, Tim Graham, and Burt Mustin.
16	16	"The Carnival Ends at Midnight"	Richard Benedict	Story by : "John Thomas James"; Teleplay by : Boris Sobelman	January 10, 1966
The daughter of murdered man sends Paul to Rio de Janeiro to bring back the man wanted for the murder, Larry Carter (Peter Lawford), an American living in Brazil to escape extradition to the United States. When two thugs attack Carter, Paul scares them off — and one of the murder victim's daughters complicates his plans to trap Carter. Other guest stars: Anne Helm, Tom Allen, Angela Dorian, Edy Williams, Carlos Rivas, Stella Garcia, Inez Pedroza, Anna Mizraki, and Edward Colmans.
17	17	"The Rediscovery of Charlotte Hyde"	William Hale	Story by : "John Thomas James"; Teleplay by : Harold Gast	January 24, 1966
When Paul visits Monte Carlo to drove in car races there, he encounters his old car-racing gigolo friend Ramon de Vega (Fernando Lamas) whose livelihood stems from charming lonely, wealthy women. Ramon meets a charming young widow, Charlotte Hyde (Gena Rowlands), who agrees to loan him $10,000 he tells her needs to keep his (actually nonexistent) ranch operating. Ramon also takes a valuable necklace of Charlotte's to a jeweler for repairs, but when he brings it back to her she has him arrested on charges that he stole it. Paul comes to Ramon's aid — and discovers some previously unknown facts. Other guest stars: Denny Miller, Ted Roter, Wolfe Barzell, and Emile Genest.
18	18	"The Night of the Terror"	Alexander Singer	Story by : "John Thomas James"; Teleplay by : Gerald Vaughan-Hughes	January 31, 1966
At a party in Greenwich Village in New York City, Harry Blunt (Donnelly Rhodes) invites everyone to visit a farmhouse he says is inhabited by spirits. Paul and his date, Jenny (Sharon Farrell) accept the invitation and have a harrowing experience. Other guest stars: Charles Aidman, Nancy Marshall, and Maggie Thrett.
19	19	"Keep My Share of the World"	Richard Benedict	Story by : Harold Livingston; Teleplay by : John W. Bloch	February 7, 1966
After spending a fortune building a car capable of breaking the world land speed record, Greek industrialist millionaire Alex Staphos (Rossano Brazzi), known as a man of depth and stature, signs Paul's friend Pete Gaffney (Jeremy Slate ) to drive it on a salt flat in North Africa. After Gaffney fails, he hires Paul and pays him $100,000 to drive the car. Paul finds the suave, unethical Staphos to be an exacting employer and a desperate man in love — because when Staphos tries to bribe Paul to end his romance with Katerina Ghiatis (Louise Troy) and Paul refuses, Staphos makes the surprising disclosure that he once was in love with her. Other guest stars: Phillip Pine and Athan Karras.
20	20	"In Search of April"	Stuart Rosenberg	Story by : "John Thomas James"; Teleplay by : Alvin Sargent	February 14, 1966
While in New Orleans for Mardi Gras, Paul makes a date with an attractive woman named April Martin (Carol Lynley), but when he arrives at her hotel to meet her he finds that she has checked out — and is being followed. His search for her leads him on a strange adventure that almost ends in murder. Other guest stars: Don Rickles, William Lundigan, Don Galloway, Gail Bonney, George Furth, Larry D. Mann, and K. T. Stevens.
21	21	"Hoodlums on Wheels"	Richard Benedict	Halsted Welles	February 21, 1966
After beating a man to death at a drive-in restaurant, a motorcycle gang of beatniks called The Saints and led by a repellant young punk called Goebbels (John Drew Barrymore) heads for the California resort where Paul′s old friend Mrs. Southworth (Marsha Hunt) and her daughter Elke (Karen Jensen) live. When Paul drops in for a visit, he finds the Southworths being terrorized by The Saints, who take him hostage as well. Other guest stars: Norman Grabowski, James Oliver, Leslie Perkins, Hinton Pope, and Stuart Anderson.
22	22	"Who's Watching the Fleshpot?"	Leslie H. Martinson	"John Thomas James"	March 7, 1966
A comedic episode which was the unsold pilot for a projected television series for the fall of 1966 starring Bobby Darin. While Paul is in the French Riviera, he encounters his old college friend Mark Shepherd (Bobby Darin), a beachcomber who operates an unusual travel and escort service along the Côte d'Or. Shepherd talks Paul into escorting a wealthy American client, Mame Huston (Eve Arden), and her glum daughter Marcia (Davey Davison). A crazy adventure ensues for Paul in which he encounters thieves, beautiful women, and a used car dealer named "Honest Abe" Lincoln (Jeff Corey). Other guest stars: Jocelyn Lane, Nicholas Colasanto, Thordis Brandt, Maurice Marsac, and Nadia Sanders.
23	23	"Sequestro: Part 1"	Richard Benedict	A. Martin Zweiback	March 14, 1966
Paul becomes the victim of an old Sicilian custom when he visits the village of his grandparents in Sicily and is kidnapped at gunpoint by two young brothers — Yanio (Sal Mineo) and Enzo (Harry Guardino) — who demand a ransom for his release of 1 million lire to finance the marriage of a tough Sicilian. Other guest stars: Marianna Hill and David Mauro.
24	24	"Sequestro: Part 2"	Richard Benedict	A. Martin Zweiback	March 21, 1966
With Paul being held for ransom in a dismal cave outside a remote town in Sicily and no ransom money arriving for his release, his kidnappers Yanio (Sal Mineo) and Enzo (Harry Guardino) decide that they must kill him. Meanwhile, the young woman whose marriage is to be financed by the ransom money, Marta (Marianna Hill), goes into town and takes a shine to a young man, resulting in stark tragedy. Also guest-starring David Mauro.
25	25	"Don't Count on Tomorrow"	Stuart Rosenberg	E. Arthur Kean	March 28, 1966
While Paul is traveling to a sports car race, his train stops in a country behind the Iron Curtain and a border guard accuses him of espionage. After he is arrested and jailed, he and his cellmate, Gyula Bognar (Roddy McDowall), plan their escape. Other guest stars: Michael Constantine, Peter Brocco, and Frank Oberschall.
26	26	"The Cruel Fountain"	Stuart Rosenberg	Henry Slesar	April 4, 1966
While in a coastal town in South America to race cars, Paul becomes interested in a former client, bitter divorcee Clara Mallory (Jan Sterling), who has arthritic hands. When he tries to help Clara and another young invalid woman — the bubbly, sweet, and attractive Belle Frazer (Kathryn Hays), who Paul takes a romantic interest in but who doctors say will never walk again after a skiing accident — his investigation into their situation leads him to Svengali-like Dr, Raphael (Murray Hamilton) — and into a sinister trap. Other guest stars: Robert Pine, Tom Stern, Kai Hernandez, Johnny Aladdin, Amentha Dymally, and Jeff Scott.
27	27	"Night Train from Chicago"	Richard Benedict	Story by : "John Thomas James"; Teleplay by : Robert Bloch	April 11, 1966
Aboard a train bound from Chicago to Los Angeles, Paul shares a dining car table with an attractive nun named Elizabeth (Louise Sorel) — but she is not what she seems, because the next time he sees her she is a smartly dressed woman on a street in Los Angeles. His attempts to find her become a murder mystery and almost lead him to his death in an encounter with the Mafia. Other guest stars: Diana Muldaur, Robert Osterloh, Brock Peters, Phil Arnold, Chris Alcaide, Nicky Blair, Anthony Brand, Dale Johnson, Don Kennedy, S. John Launer, John McCann, Ollie O'Toole, and Cosmo Sardo.
28	28	"The Last Safari"	Abner Biberman	Story by : "John Thomas James"; Teleplay by : John W. Bloch & Mel Goldberg	April 25, 1966
At the request of a doctor, Paul travels to Africa to visit millionaire sportsman Mark Foster (Leslie Nielsen) to help Foster face the fact that his young daughter Julie (Lesley Ann Warren) has a terminal illness — and Paul ends up teaching Julie how to get the most out of the life she has left. Other guest stars: Abraham Sofaer and Jean Durand.
29	29	"The Savage Machines"	Richard Benedict	Story by : Robert Guy Barrows; Teleplay by : William Wood	May 2, 1966
After a car entered by Paul and driven by his friend Pete Gaffney (Jeremy Slate) qualifies during time trials for an international car race in Spain, they run into trouble. They turn to sportscar maker Clive Darrell (Edward Mulhare), whose firm is failing and who has a bitter relationship with his estranged wife Rhona (Sally Ann Howes). Paul, Gaffney, and Darrell hope that by combining forces they all can win. Bent on divorce, however, Rhona tries to undermine their efforts until she and Darrell finally decide that they cannot live without each other after all. When race day comes, Paul risks his life for a victory that will save Darrell's business — and marriage. Also guest-stars Brendan Dillon.
30	30	"The Sadness of a Happy Time"	Alf Kjellin	Teleplay by : John W. Bloch; Based on a story by : Patrick Kennedy	May 16, 1966
In a Spanish coastal village on the Costa Brava, Paul falls in love with Nicole (Claudine Longet), a pretty French novelist and sophistictaed realist. He wants to marry her, but is afraid that if he tells her about his terminal illness, she will leave him. When Paul's rough-and-tumble secret agent friend Mike Allen (Stephen McNally) arrives, he upsets their relationship, leads her to suspect Paul of being an American secret agent — and prompts her to leave him for that reason. Other guest stars: Michael Stanwood, Lili Valenty, Eumenio Blanco, and Don Diamond.

=== Season 2 (1966–1967) ===
No. overall	No. in season	Title	Directed by	Written by	Original release date
31	1	"The Day Time Stopped"	Leo Penn	Henry Slesar	September 12, 1966
After an accident, Paul awakens in a hospital in Switzerland suffering from a case of amnesia. Unable to remember the accident or anything else from the preceding six months, his is advised to retrace his steps to determine what happened to him that made him forget. Other guest stars: Anne Helm, John Kerr, Carol Lawrence, Billy Daniels, Sheree North, John Ireland, and Paul Lukas.
32	2	"I Am the Late Diana Hays"	Michael Ritchie	Dale & Katherine Eunson	September 19, 1966
Sculptor Julian Hays (Jack Palance) and his wealthy and kooky wife Diana (Diana Hyland) are an offbeat couple with an unconventional style in San Francisco, California, and after she disappears, he is convicted of murdering her and begins serving a life sentence for the crime. While in Mexico, Paul is surprised to find Diana alive and well there — she had faked her death, burning her personal effects and leaving a charred diamond as evidence. Paul convinces her to return to San Francisco to set things right by getting Julian freed and agrees to provide her with legal representation. Her return to San Francisco astonishes District Attorney George McCullough (Laurence Haddon), who had prosecuted Julian for her murder, and puts Julian in a murderous rage that makes Paul fear that he will kill Diana after all. Other guest stars: Isabelle Cooley, Anthony Eisley, Paula Winslowe, Joy Ellison, and Joe Finnigan.
33	3	"The Borders of Barbarism"	Richard Benedict	Teleplay by : John Thomas James; Based on a story by : Eric Williams	September 26, 1966
Paul picks up beautiful Gilian Wales (Joan Collins) in a pub in London, and she wants him to accompany her to Yugoslavia to recover a tin box containing diamonds and documents buried there by her late father — a British counterspy — during World War II and clear her father's name. Intelligence agent Mike Allen Stephen McNally} asks the reluctant Paul to accompany her in the hope that her father's World War II association with the Yugoslav Partisans will yield valuable Cold War information. Based on the 1961 novel The Borders of Barbarism by Eric Williams. Other guest stars: Alf Kjellin, Joseph Sirola, Reginald Owen, Jack Good, George Pirana, Don Knight, Gabor Curtiz, Lawrence Montaigne, Peter Forster, and Jane Betts.
34	4	"The Committee for the 25th"	William Graham	Story by : Tom Allen; Teleplay by : Luther Davis	October 3, 1966
Paul is appalled to find Sarah Sinclair (Brooke Bundy) — a very young San Francisco heiress he knows — hung up in a cage and performing a trance-like dance in a casino in Las Vegas owned by gangsters, and when he tries to question her, thugs beat him up and smash his hands, warning him to stay out of Las Vegas. After Paul informs her father (Wendell Corey) — a friend of Paul's and former San Francisco mayor who has become a wealthy and influential politician in Las Vegas — that his daughter is a virtual prisoner of an underworld gambling czar, her father becomes determined to abolish gambling and enlists Paul's help. Other guest stars: Edward Asner and Edward Faulkner.
35	5	"The Dark Beyond the Door"	Richard L. Bare	Story by : "John Thomas James"; Teleplay by : John W. Bloch	October 10, 1966
The marriage of Paul's oldest friends, Jim and Ellen Carlson (Peter Graves and Delphi Lawrence), is about to break up because Ellen has chosen to drink herself to death rather than talk it out after she discovers that Jim — Paul's former law partner and the owner of a football team — is making mysterious monthly payments, leading her to believe that Jim is romantically involved with another woman. Paul sets out to investigate, and the payments lead him to George Kowal (Michael Dunn), a shifty and unsavory dwarf. Other guest stars: Kent McCord and Robert Nichols.
36	6	"The Sex Object"	Leo Penn	Henry Slesar	October 17, 1966
While at a plush resort in Mexico waiting for his friend Ramon De Vega — a Latin lover and European international gigolo perpetually in search of wealthy women for his own financial gain — Paul meets two career women from New York City, Diana Murrow (Joan Hackett) and her friend Louise (Sharon Farrell), both of whom are gold diggers scheming to meet wealthy men to marry. After Ramon arrives, he and Diana try to con one another despite Paul's attempts to warn them about each other, with Ramon pretending to be wealthy and Diana claiming to be a rich heiress — and the situation descends into romantic farce when Ramon and Diana actually fall in love. Other guest stars: Pepe Hern and Fernando Escandon.
37	7	"The Grotenberg Mask"	Nicholas Colasanto	Henry Slesar	October 24, 1966
While at a ski resort in Sweden, Paul and attractive and attentive jet setter Diana Fuller (Elizabeth Ashley) investigate a murder. They suspect that Charles Cadell (Skip Homeier), with whom they had shared an ocean liner voyage, murdered his wife, and must deal with untrustworthy ski instructor Johnny Cadell (Tom Simcox). Also guest-starring George Furth.
38	8	"Edge of the Volcano"	Leo Penn	Ed Waters & Paul David Moessinger	October 31, 1966
Paul and Abby Powers (Katherine Crawford), the daughter of famed novelist Eliot Ponas (John Dehner), travel deep into the mountains of South America to find Eliot, who is staying at the camp of rebel leader Mario Cudero (Alejandro Rey) to gather material for a new book. They plead with Eliot to return to New York City with them, but his mixed feelings about Cudero′s cause make the decision difficult for him. Paul helps Eliot discover his true feelings about Cudero's revolution — and gets roughed up by soldiers. Other guest stars: Len Wayland, Edmund Hashim, Don Diamond, and Ruben Moreno.
39	9	"The Treasure Seekers"	Nicholas Colasanto	Max Ehrlich	November 14, 1966
Paul arrives in San Francisco on a flight from Tokyo and discovers that he has won $500,000 in a sweepstakes. Not needing the money, he decides to do with it as he chooses. He is besieged by old acquaintances and newfound friends who want a share of it, and also finds himself pursued by Lisa Rand (Collin Wilcox), a sharp and smart newswoman who wants to tell his story, and, to his dismay, facing the possibility of having to reveal the secret that he is terminally ill. Other guest stars: Jack Albertson, Bruce Dern, Anne Helm, and Rosemary Murphy.
40	10	"The Man Who Had No Enemies"	Michael Ritchie	Story by : "John Thomas James"; Teleplay by : John W. Bloch	November 21, 1966
After Paul sails to a small Caribbean island with a newfound friend — a millionaire socialite and sailboat racer from Hot Springs, Arkansas — the man is murdered. The man supposedly knew no one on the island and the crime has overtones of Mafia involvement, and a local police official, Inspector Kronig (Kurt Kasznar), views Paul as the prime suspect in the murder. Paul sets out to solve the murder and clear his name in an investigation in which three beautiful women — Kay Mills (Joanna Moore), Katherine (Nancy Malone), and Eileen Trotter (Victoria Shaw) — play key roles, but the victim's widow, once an old friend of Paul's, makes no effort to help him. Other guest stars: John Lodge, Jean Durand, Ward Ramsey, Jason Wingreen, and Kai Hernandez.
41	11	"A Game of Violence"	Leo Penn	Louis Guardino	November 28, 1966
Paul returns to San Francisco, where an old friend of his, boxer Duke Smith (Sugar Ray Robinson), is heavily favored to win a middleweight title bout but collapses mysteriously in the third round. Although Smith is accused of "taking a dive," Paul believes he is an honest fighter and stands by him — but Paul′s suspicions are aroused when he discovers a $25,000 payment made by gambler Sam Miller (Tige Andrews). Robinson, a real-life former boxing champion, made his dramatic debut in this episode. Other guest stars: Ossie Davis, Carol Lawrence, Janet MacLachlan, Chick Hearn, and Jim Healy.
42	12	"Hang Down Your Head and Laugh"	Michael Ritchie	Story by : Jack Curtis; Teleplay by : Adrian Joyce & Jack Curtis	December 5, 1966
While aboard a westbound bus headed for California, Paul meets Tina (Kim Darby), a disturbed but arresting teenage girl who startles the passengers. They befriend one another, and after the bus breaks down, they continue their journey together in a rented car, each trying to learn the reasons for the other's way of life. She responds with hostility and evasion as Paul questions her about her exact destination and whether or not she is a runaway and lectures her about running away from home, and it becomes apparent that her arrogance is both a cover for her loneliness and a cry for help. Other guest stars: Jacqueline Scott and Larry Ward.
43	13	"Tears from a Glass Eye"	Leo Penn	Story by : "John Thomas James"; Teleplay by : Luther Davis	December 12, 1966
While Paul is visiting a Caribbean resort, the one-eyed owner of a chain of car washes offers him $100,000 to marry his beautiful ex-wife, Laura Bronson (Mary Ann Mobley). Paul becomes suspicious when a well-known con man begins to romance Laura and intervenes to help her choose the right man for a husband. (Some sources describe the Laura Bronson character as a young widow.) Other guest stars: Gerald S. O'Loughlin and Donnelly Rhodes.
44	14	"Time and a Half on Christmas Eve"	Michael Ritchie	Story by : Dan Aubry; Teleplay by : A. Martin Zweiback	December 19, 1966
When Paul′s car breaks down and leaves him stranded in a small town on Christmas Eve, he becomes involved in the life of Harry (Ernest Borgnine), a taxicab driver who has lost everything spiritually important in his life. Harry has refused to see his wife and son for nine years, and as he drives Paul around town and discusses his problems he suddenly discovers that he is lonely and his life is empty without his family. Other guest stars: Melanie Alexander, Richard Bull, Charles McGraw, and Craig Hundley.
45	15	"The Shock of Recognition"	William Hale	John D. F. Black	December 26, 1966
In Spain, Paul encounters Charlie Herrod (Farley Granger), a movie star whose life is controlled by the sycophantic agents and managers who surround him. To regain his self-respect, Herrod decides to perform an act of bravery in the bullfighting ring. Matador Jose Tirado appears as himself. Other guest stars: Gavin MacLeod, Marlyn Mason, Walter Mathews, and Frank Silvera.
46	16	"Flight from Tirana"	John Rich	Joel Murcott	January 9, 1967
Part 1 of 2. Paul is tricked into traveling to Tirana, Albania, to mount a legal defense of his old school friend, United States Army defector Sergeant Dave Corbett (Ossie Davis), against charges of espionage. In Tirana, he plays a pivotal role in an international plot involving espionage, narcotics, Corbett′s wife Linda (Gloria Edwards), a heroin addict, and ends up having to flee from pursuing Albanians. Other guest stars: Robert Knapp, Edward Binns, James Callahan, Nicholas Colasanto, Will Kuluva, Mike Road, Chet Stratton, George Voskove, Sam Wanamaker, and William Yip.
47	17	"A Rage for Justice"	Leo Penn	Story by : "John Thomas James"; Teleplay by : John W. Bloch	January 16, 1967
Part 2 of 2. After Paul and United States Army Sergeant Dave Corbett (Ossie Davis) escape from Albania under gunfire from Albanian Communists, Paul defends Corbett at his court martial in Athens, Greece, for desertion, black marketeering, and aiding the enemy. Paul is convinced that the Albanians forced Corbett to defect to save his late wife Linda (Gloria Edwards), whom the Albanians had made into a heroin addict — but it is not clear that the prosecutor, Major Joe Rankin (Sam Wanamaker), really is seeking justice. Other guest stars: Robert Knapp, Edward Binns, James Callahan, Nicholas Colasanto, Will Kuluva, Mike Road, Chet Stratton, George Voskove, and William Yip.
48	18	"The List of Alice McKenna"	Michael Ritchie	Story by : "John Thomas James"; Teleplay by : Jerry Ludwig & David W. Rintels	January 23, 1967
49	19	"The Face of the Antagonist"	Nicholas Colasanto	Howard Browne	January 30, 1967
50	20	"Baby, the World's on Fire"	Leo Penn	Shirl Hendryx	February 6, 1967
51	21	"Rendezvous in Tokyo"	Richard Benedict	Harold Livingston	February 13, 1967
52	22	"The Calculus of Chaos"	William Hale	Bill S. Ballinger & Lou Breslow	February 20, 1967
53	23	"The Assassin"	Nicholas Colasanto	Henry Slesar	February 27, 1967
54	24	"The Carpella Collection"	Alexander Singer	Robert Foster & Philip DeGuere	March 6, 1967
55	25	"A Very Small Injustice"	Nicholas Colasanto	Ronald M. Cohen	March 13, 1967
56	26	"East of the Equator"	Fernando Lamas	Story by : "John Thomas James"; Teleplay by : Henri Simoun	March 20, 1967
57	27	"A Choice of Evils"	Ben Gazzara	Story by : Rita Lakin; Teleplay by : Alvin Sargent & Rita Lakin	April 3, 1967
58	28	"Tell it to the Dead"	Leo Penn	Story by : Philip DeGuere & Betty Andrews; Teleplay by : Luther Davis	April 10, 1967
59	29	"Better World Next Time"	Michael Ritchie	Jack Miller	April 17, 1967
60	30	"The Word Would Be Goodbye"	Alf Kjellin	Story by : Don Balluck & Patrick Kennedy; Teleplay by : Don Balluck & John W. Bloch	April 24, 1967

=== Season 3 (1967–1968) ===
No. overall	No. in season	Title	Directed by	Written by	Original release date
61	1	"Who's Che Guevara?"	Michael Ritchie	Philip DeGuere & Robert Foster	September 13, 1967
62	2	"The Inhuman Predicament"	Alexander Singer	Story by : "John Thomas James"; Teleplay by : Barry Pritchard & Robert Hamner	September 20, 1967
63	3	"Three Passengers for the Lusitania"	Richard Benedict	Erich Faust	September 27, 1967
64	4	"The Frozen Image"	Nicholas Colasanto	Mel Torme	October 4, 1967
65	5	"Trip to the Far Side"	Fernando Lamas	Story by : "John Thomas James"; Teleplay by : "Paul Tuckahoe"	October 11, 1967
66	6	"The Company of Scoundrels"	Michael Ritchie	Story by : Roy Huggins; Teleplay by : Howard Browne	October 18, 1967
67	7	"At the End of the Rainbow There's Another Rainbow"	Nicholas Colasanto	Story by : "John Thomas James"; Teleplay by : Henry Slesar & "John Thomas James"	October 25, 1967
68	8	"Down with Willy Hatch"	Richard Benedict	Richard Baer	November 1, 1967
69	9	"The Naked Half Truth"	Michael Ritchie	Story by : Roger O. Hirson; Teleplay by : Marc Norman & Roger O. Hirson	November 8, 1967
70	10	"Tell It Like It Is"	Ben Gazzara	Shirl Hendrix	November 15, 1967
71	11	"Cry Hard, Cry Fast: Part 1"	Michael Ritchie	Luther Davis	November 22, 1967
72	12	"Cry Hard, Cry Fast: Part 2"	Michael Ritchie	Luther Davis	November 29, 1967
73	13	"The Mustafa Embrace"	Murray Golden	Story by : Roy Huggins; Teleplay by : Robert Hamner	December 6, 1967
74	14	"It Could Only Happen in Rome"	Alexander Singer	Elick Moll	December 13, 1967
75	15	"Fly by Night"	Richard Benedict	Story by : Roy Huggins; Teleplay by : Philip DeGuere & Robert Foster	December 20, 1967
76	16	"A Dangerous Proposal"	Barry Shear	Story by : Tom Blackburn; Teleplay by : Robert Hamner	January 3, 1968
77	17	"One Bad Turn"	Ben Gazzara	Story by : Roy Huggins; Teleplay by : Paul Mason	January 10, 1968
78	18	"The Rape of Lucrece"	Larry Peerce	Story by : Dale & Katherine Eunson; Teleplay by : Chase Mellon	January 17, 1968
79	19	"The Killing Scene"	Ben Gazzara	Story by : Edward DeBlasio; Teleplay by : Philip DeGuere & Robert Foster	February 1, 1968
80	20	"Sara-Jane, You Never Whispered Again"	Alexander Singer	Story by : Roy Huggins; Teleplay by : Adrian Joyce	February 8, 1968
81	21	"Strategy of Terror"	Unknown	Unknown	February 15, 1968
82	22	"The Dead on Furlough"	Alexander Singer	Story by : Paul Freeman; Teleplay by : James M. Miller	February 22, 1968
83	23	"Beware My Love"	George McCowan	Robert L. Thompson	March 2, 1968
84	24	"Carol"	Ben Gazzara	Story by : Robert Foster; Teleplay by : Philip DeGuere & Robert Foster	March 9, 1968
85	25	"Life Among the Meat Eaters"	Robert Day	Story by : Robert Hamner; Teleplay by : Mann Rubin	March 16, 1968
86	26	"The Exchange"	John Llewellyn Moxey	Story by : "John Thomas James"; Teleplay by : Howard Browne	March 27, 1968

== Production ==
Bryan needed to have a disease from which he would die, but would not affect his quality of life otherwise. The disease selected was chronic myelogenous leukemia.

== Adaptation ==
In March 1997, it was reported Universal Pictures was developing a feature adaptation of the series as a potential vehicle for John Travolta.
