= Raymond Durand =

Raymond Durand may refer to:

- Raymond Durand (rally driver) (born 1952), French rally driver
- Raymond Durand (politician) (1945–2025), French politician
- Raymond Durand (sport shooter) (1894–1977), French Olympic shooter
- Louis Marie Raymond Durand (1786–1837), French diplomat, consul in Warsaw during the November Uprising
