= Randt =

Randt is a surname. Notable people with the surname include:

- Clark Randt (born 1945), American lawyer and diplomat
- Leif Randt (born 1983), German author
- Os du Randt (born 1972), South African rugby player
- Peter Randt (born 1941), German handball player

== See also ==
- Du Randt
