= Alexander B. Lamberton =

American politician and conservationist (1839–1919)

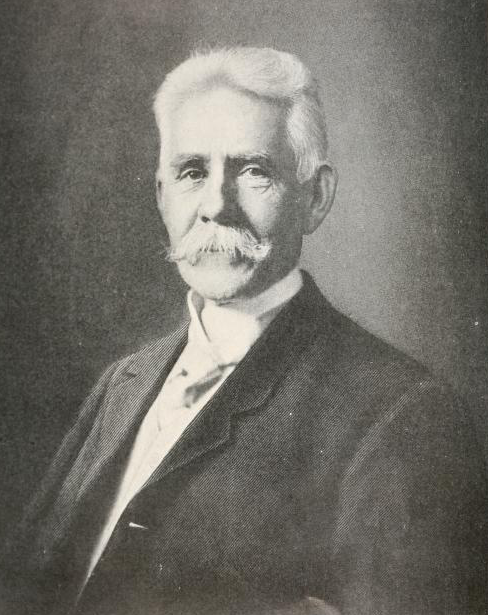
- Lamberton in a 1916 publication
- Born: Alexander Byron Lamberton; February 28, 1839; Richhill, County Armagh, Ireland
- Died: May 24, 1919 (aged 80); Rochester, New York, U.S.
- Resting place: Mount Hope Cemetery
- Education: Auburn Theological Seminary; University of Rochester (AB)
- Occupations: Politician; lumberman; pastor; real estate agent
- Political party: Democratic/Prohibition Party (before 1880); Republican (1880 and after)
- Spouse: Eunice B. Hussey (m. 1864; died 1898)
- Children: 2

Alexander Byron Lamberton (February 28, 1839 – May 24, 1919) was an American politician, conservationist and lumberman. He served on the park board and as park commissioner in Rochester, New York, from 1894 to 1918. He was known for expanding the parks in Rochester and establishing Durand Eastman Park and Seneca Park Zoo.

== Early life ==
Alexander Byron Lamberton was born on February 28, 1839, in Richhill, County Armagh, Ireland, to Ann Jane (née Chambers) and Alexander Lamberton. His parents were of Scotch-Irish ancestry. When he was two years old, he moved with his family to the United States. He studied in common schools in New York. He studied divinity at Auburn Theological Seminary and graduated in 1864. He then graduated from the University of Rochester with a Bachelor of Arts in 1866. He was a member of the Delta Upsilon fraternity.

== Career ==
Lamberton was ordained a minister in 1869 and served as pastor of the Tompkins Avenue Church in Brooklyn for two years. He left the ministry due to poor health. He then pursued a planing mill and lumber yard at Exchange and Spring streets in Rochester until around 1864. He served as director and the first vice president of the East Side Savings Bank for several years. He also served as a founding trustee, director, and a member of the executive committee of the Genesee Valley Trust Company. He also worked as a real estate agent in Rochester.

Lamberton was a Democrat. He ran for the New York State Senate in 1877 against William N. Emerson, but lost. In 1878, he ran unsuccessfully against John Van Voorhis for the U.S. House of Representatives. In 1880, he switched to the Republican Party. In 1881, it was reported he was a potential opponent to incumbent state senator Edmund L. Pitts. At one point, he was also affiliated with the Prohibition Party. He also ran unsuccessfully for mayor of Rochester. Lamberton was a member of the board of managers of the State Industrial School. He succeeded Charles H. Babcock as president of the Rochester Public Market. He was elected as president of the Rochester Chamber of Commerce on June 8, 1901, serving for one term. He helped influence the erection of the swing bridge over the canal on Exchange street.

In March 1876, he liberated 50,000 brook trout in the Fulton Chain of Lakes. In the 1880s, he invested in The Sunday Morning Herald, a Rochester-based newspaper. He was appointed to the Rochester park board in 1894 under Mayor George W. Aldridge. He then served on the board of the park commission until he became president of the board on March 26, 1902, succeeding Edwin Mott Moore. When the Department of Parks was created in 1915, he was appointed park commissioner. He was head of the bureau of playgrounds and recreation parks. He established Durand Eastman Park and Seneca Park Zoo. Under his tenure, park conditions improved, band concerts and other forms of entertainment were added to the parks. Frederick Law Olmsted, the landscape architect of the parks, was opposed to Lamberton's plans for large events in the park. He retired as park commissioner on January 25, 1918. He was an advocate of forest preservation and urged the state to protect the forests of the Adirondack Mountains. He also encouraged fish and game protection and wrote Animals, Birds and Fishes of North America. He was vice president of the National Association for the Protection of Game and was chairman of the committee on nomenclature.

== Personal life ==
Lamberton married Eunice B. (née Starbuck) Hussey, daughter of Charles R. Starbuck and widow of Obed Hussey, of Nantucket on May 6, 1864. They had two daughters, Eunice Starbuck and Mary Byronia. His wife died in 1898. He was an extensive traveler. He traveled to the Adirondacks, Switzerland, Troy, Messina, Syria, Babylon, and Asia Minor. He was a member of Brick Church in Rochester. He became an elder of the church on March 4, 1902. He studied Sanskrit and had an extensive library.

For a time in the 1860s, he lived in Plattsburgh. In January 1876, Lamberton bought the Forge House and Forge Tract of 1,358 acres (550 ha) in Old Forge, New York, from S. Adelaide Buell.

Lamberton died on May 24, 1919, in Rochester. He was buried in Mount Hope Cemetery.

== Legacy ==
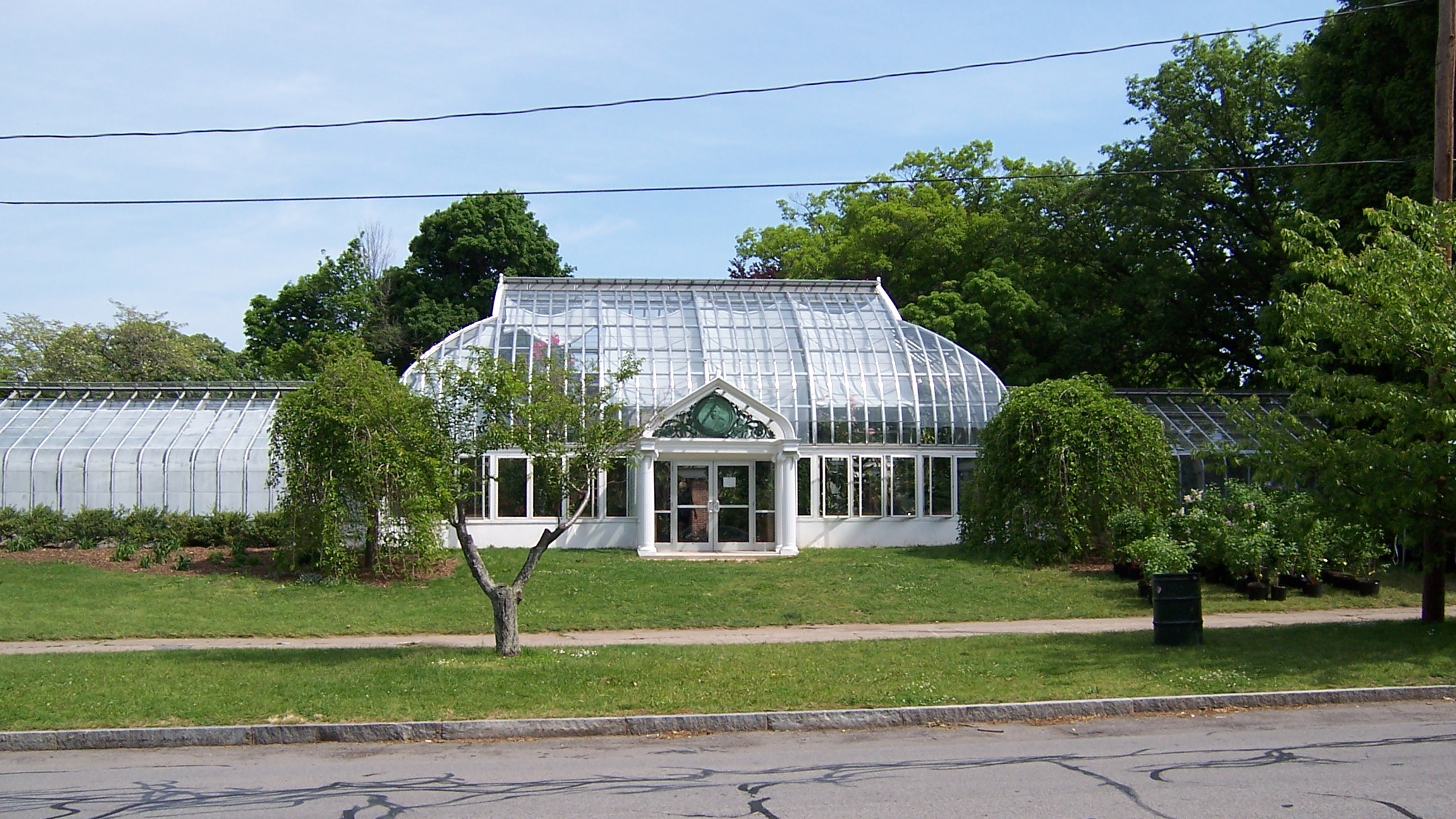
Lamberton Conservatory in Highland Park

His sister-in-law Mary A. Starbuck gifted US$20,000 to name a conservatory at the entrance of Highland Park after Lamberton. It was named the Lamberton Conservatory. Lamberton Street in Rochester was also named after him.
