= Pierre Durand =

Pierre Durand may refer to:

- Pierre Durand (pastor) (died 1732), French Huguenot pastor and martyr
- Pierre Durand (equestrian, born 1931) (1931–2016), French Olympic equestrian
- Pierre Durand (equestrian, born 1955), French Olympic equestrian champion
- Pascal Pia, born with name Pierre Durand

== See also ==
- Peter Durand, British merchant who patented the tin can
- Durand (surname)
