= Maria Ramita Martinez =

Native american potter

- Born: 1884; Picuris Pueblo
- Died: October 1969 (aged 84–85)
- Resting place: Picuris
- Known for: Potter
- Style: Traditional
- Spouse: Juan José Martinez

Maria Ramita Simbolo Martinez "Summer Harvest" (1884 - October 1969) was a Picuris Pueblo potter. Martinez learned traditional methods of creating pottery and has been recognized for preserving a cultural tradition of the Picuris Pueblo. Martinez collaborated with her husband, Juan José Martinez, who decorated her finished pots.

== Biography ==
Martinez was born in Picuris Pueblo in 1884 to the Simbola family. She learned to make pots by watching her mother, Solidad Simbola, make her own. In the pueblo, she was known as "Summer Harvest." She married Juan José Martinez, and the couple had six children together. She and her husband collaborated on the pottery she made and sold their items together from the back of a wagon.

Martinez died in October 1969 and was buried in Picuris. A historic marker in New Mexico describes her contribution to the preservation of traditional pottery methods.

== Work ==
Martinez gathered clay from the hills outside Picuris. Martinez used traditional methods to work on her pots which were generally red-brown in color and had a sparkles from the mica in the clay. She would shape the pots and then her husband, Juan José Martinez, would decorate them before firing.

Martinez's work is part of the collections of the Museum of Indian Arts and Culture and the Leonard D. Hollister Collection at the University of Massachusetts Amherst.

== See also ==
- Virginia Duran
- Cora Durand
