= Bright College Years =

One of the traditional songs of Yale University

Bright College Years
Sung by the 2006 Yale Whiffenpoofs

"Bright College Years" is one of the traditional songs of Yale University, and the university's unofficial but undisputed alma mater. It was written in 1881 by Henry Durand and set to the tune of "Die Wacht am Rhein".

During World War I and shortly afterward, "Bright College Years" was nearly banned for its German origins. Yale men stationed in Paris sang it to the tune of "La Marseillaise".

== Lyrics ==
Written by H.S. Durand 1881

Music composed by Karl Wilhelm; (SATB) arr. Robert Bonds ‘71

Bright College years, with pleasure rife, The shortest, gladdest years of life; How swiftly are ye gliding by! Oh, why doth time so quickly fly? The seasons come, the seasons go, The earth is green or white with snow, But time and change shall naught avail To break the friendships formed at Yale.

We all must leave this college home, About the stormy world to roam; But though the mighty ocean’s tide Should us from dear old Yale divide, As round the oak the ivy twines The clinging tendrils of its vines, So are our hearts close bound to Yale By ties of love that ne’er shall fail.

In after years, should troubles rise To cloud the blue of sunny skies, How bright will seem, through mem’ry’s haze Those happy, golden, bygone days! Oh, let us strive that ever we May let these words our watch-cry be, Where’er upon life’s sea we sail:

“For God, for Country, and for Yale!”

== Performance ==
The Yale Glee Club, custodians of the Yale song tradition through publication of Songs of Yale, traditionally closes every concert with the alma mater. At the end of The Game the Yale Precision Marching Band performs the song while the senior members of the band sing along. Various member parties in the Yale Political Union include "Bright College Years" in their toasting sessions and celebrations. In addition, the song is sung at the end of Class Day (held the day before University Commencement annually). White handkerchiefs are raised in the air and waved on the last line. Traditionally, only the first and third verses are sung.

== In popular culture ==
- The 1946-49 radio adaptation of Frank Merriwell used "Bright College Years" as its theme tune.
- Bright College Years: Inside the American Campus Today is a book by Anne Matthews published in 1997 describing modern day academia.
- Bright College Years is a 1971 documentary filmed by Peter Rosen describing the reactions of people at Yale to President Nixon's bombing of Cambodia and the arrest of several Black Panther leaders in New Haven.
- "Bright College Days" is the name of a satirical alma mater written by Harvard's Tom Lehrer. It contains several Yale references and resets the lyrics to Aura Lea.
