= Thomas C. Duffy =

American classical composer

Thomas C. Duffy, DMA (born June 17, 1955) is Professor (adjunct) of Music and the Director of Bands at Yale University.

== Biography ==
Duffy received his Bachelor of Science in Music Education (magna cum laude) and Master of Music in Composition from the University of Connecticut, and his Doctor of Musical Arts in Composition from Cornell University, where he studied with Karel Husa and Steven Stucky.

He has taught music courses at the Hartford Conservatory, the University of Connecticut, the Auburn Maximum Security Correctional Facility, Cornell, and Yale. In 1996, Duffy was selected as Outstanding Music Educator of the Year by the Connecticut Music Educators Association. From 1997 to 2005, Duffy served as Deputy Dean (Principal) of the Yale School of Music; from July 2005 through June 2006, he served as Acting Dean (Principal).

Duffy served as President of the College Band Directors National Association from 2009 to 2011.

In 2019, Duffy wrote a piece called "Power and Light" for two banks in Williamsville, New York. His music is published by American Composers Alliance, Ludwig Music, and Bourne Company Music Publishers.
