= Picuris Pueblo, New Mexico =

Picuris Pueblo, New Mexico P'įwweltha (Northern Tiwa)
- CDP
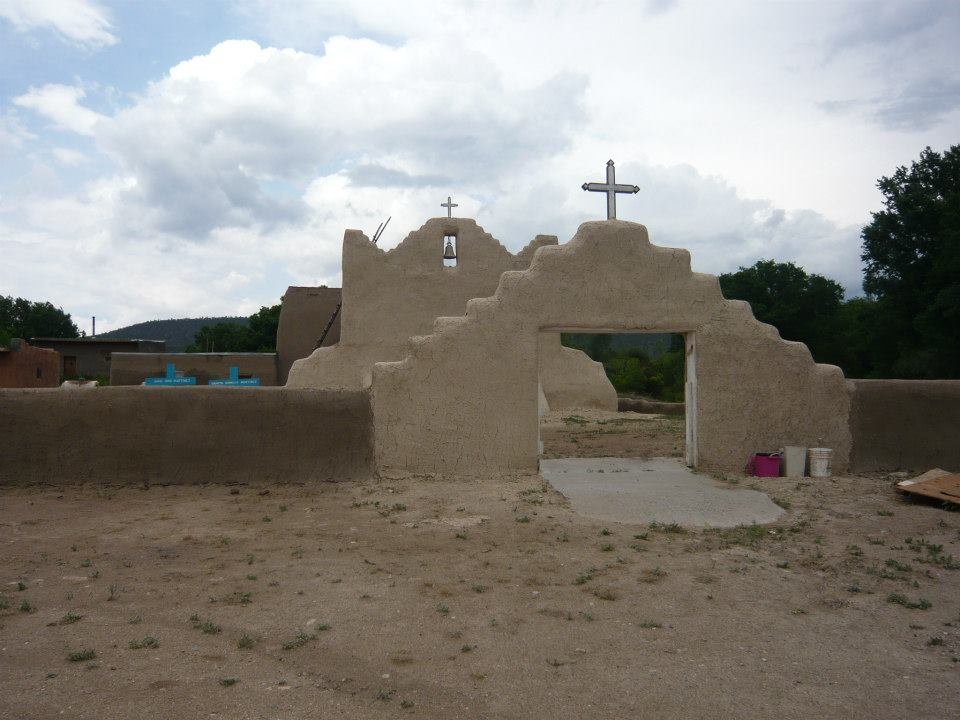
- San Lorenzo de Picurís

- Location of Picuris Pueblo (CDP), New Mexico

- Location in the United States
- Coordinates: 36°11′58″N 105°42′47″W
- Country: United States
- State: New Mexico
- County: Taos

Area
  - Total: 0.46 sq mi (1.19 km^{2})
  - Land: 0.46 sq mi (1.18 km^{2})
  - Water: 0.0039 sq mi (0.01 km^{2})
- Elevation: 7,277 ft (2,218 m)

Population (2020)
  - Total: 83
  - Density: 181.7/sq mi (70.17/km^{2})
- Time zone: UTC-7 (Mountain (MST))
  - Summer (DST): UTC-6 (MDT)
- Area code: 505
- FIPS code: 35-56810
- GNIS feature ID: 2409063

- Picuris Pueblo
- U.S. National Register of Historic Places
- U.S. Historic district
- NM State Register of Cultural Properties
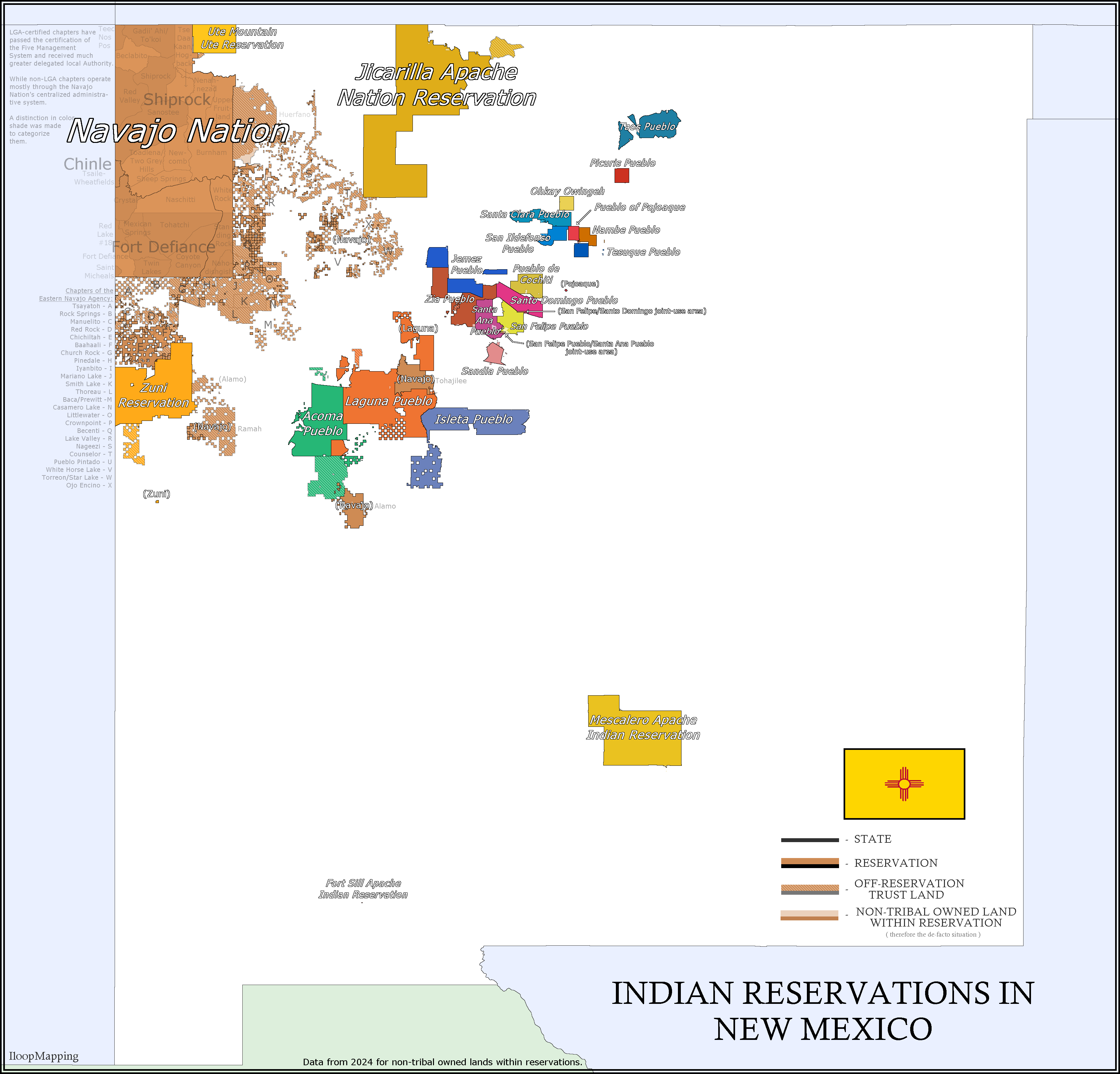
- Location of Picuris Pueblo and neighboring pueblos in New Mexico (In red)
- Nearest city: Taos, New Mexico
- Area: 20.4 acres (8.3 ha)
- Built: 1776
- Architectural style: Pueblo
- NRHP reference No.: 74001211
- NMSRCP No.: 229

Significant dates
- Added to NRHP: August 13, 1974
- Designated NMSRCP: December 30, 1971

Picuris Pueblo (/pɪkəˈriːs/; Tiwa: P'įwweltha [p’ī̃wːēltʰà]) is a historic pueblo in Taos County, New Mexico, United States. The federally recognized tribe of Tiwa Pueblo people of the same name inhabit the community. Picurís Pueblo is a member of the Eight Northern Pueblos. Their own name for their pueblo is P'įwweltha, meaning "mountain warrior place" or "mountain pass place." They speak the Picuris dialect of the Northern Tiwa language, part of the Kiowa-Tanoan language family. For statistical purposes, the United States Census Bureau has defined that community as a census-designated place (CDP). As of the 2020 census, Picuris Pueblo had a population of 83.

== Geography ==
Picuris Pueblo is located in northern New Mexico, on the western slopes of the Sangre de Cristo Mountains and 18 miles south of Taos Pueblo. Average elevation in the pueblo is over 7,000 feet. The Rio Santa Barbara ("Tuikwepapama") and Rio Pueblo ("Telpupápamá") unite near Picurus to form Embudo Creek, a tributary of the Rio Grande ("Pasxlapakwlix").

== Demographics ==
Historical population
Census	Pop.	Note	%±
2020	83		—
U.S. Decennial Census

As of the census of 2000, there were 86 people, 38 households, and 18 families residing in the CDP. The population density was 192.7 inhabitants per square mile (74.4/km^{2}). There were 60 housing units at an average density of 134.4 per square mile (51.9/km^{2}). The racial makeup of the CDP was 10.47% White, 70.93% Native American, 16.28% from other races, and 2.33% from two or more races. Hispanic or Latino of any race were 26.74% of the population.

There were 38 households, out of which 10.5% had children under the age of 18 living with them, 21.1% were married couples living together, 13.2% had a female householder with no husband present, and 52.6% were non-families. 42.1% of all households were made up of individuals, and 13.2% had someone living alone who was 65 years of age or older. The average household size was 2.26 and the average family size was 3.33.

In the CDP, the population was spread out, with 16.3% under the age of 18, 10.5% from 18 to 24, 30.2% from 25 to 44, 24.4% from 45 to 64, and 18.6% who were 65 years of age or older. The median age was 43 years. For every 100 females, there were 95.5 males. For every 100 females age 18 and over, there were 105.7 males.

The median income for a household in the CDP was $11,528, and the median income for a family was $16,875. Males had a median income of $21,000 versus $23,333 for females. The per capita income for the CDP was $12,492. There were 36.0% of families and 28.7% of the population living below the poverty line, including no under eighteens and 45.0% of those over 64.

In 1990, 147 of the 1,882 enrolled tribal members lived in the pueblo; however, the number reduced to 86 in 2000. At the 2010 Census, the population was recorded as 68. By 2014, it was one of the smallest Tiwa pueblos.

== History ==
The Picuris People once lived in Chaco Canyon, now a UNESCO World Heritage Site. The Picuris people later lived in a village of about 3,000 people now known as Pot Creek, near Taos. They migrated to the present location along the Rio Pueblo about 1250 CE. In the 15th century it was one of the largest Tiwa pueblos, influenced by Apache and other Plains Indian cultures, as was the Taos Pueblo.

In the late 17th century people from the pueblos of New Mexico revolted against the Spanish colonialists, particularly during a revolt between 1680 and 1696 when they fought for autonomy and their land. Following this period the people of the pueblo were dispersed and had abandoned their pueblo until 1706. At that time they joined with the Spanish to fight against attacks by Comanche and Apache tribes. Then, the Picuris pueblo people settled into a peaceful period.

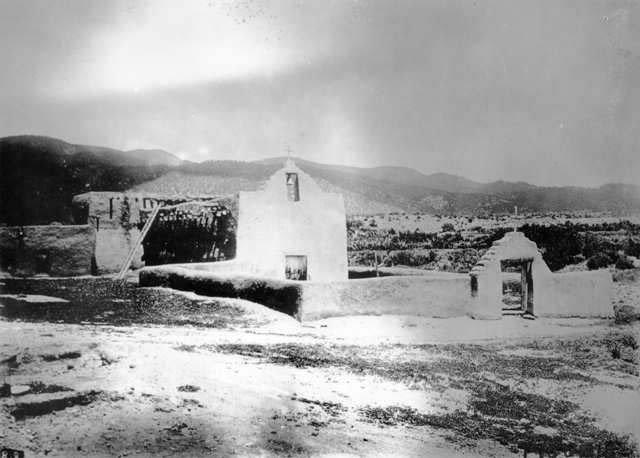
San Lorenzo de Picurís, circa 1915

Spanish explorer Don Juan de Oñate named the pueblo "Pikuria" - which means "those who paint." The pueblo was influenced by the Spanish, particularly adoption of Christian religious practices and letting go of traditional rituals and ceremonies. The San Lorenzo de Picurís church was built of adobe by 1776 and was restored in the 21st century. Having been influenced by the Spanish and then the Americans for centuries, the Picuris adopted telephone and electrical services, paved roads and television. They resumed their traditional customs, which are performed throughout the year, and became self-governing again in the mid-1920s. As of 2014, the pueblo maintained a growing herd of buffalo. Pueblo is a member of the Intertribal Buffalo Council.

== Education ==
The community is in the Peñasco Independent School District.

== Government ==
The Pueblo's headquarters is in Peñasco, New Mexico. Their tribal officers, led by a tribal governor, are elected every two years. The administration of the Pueblo of Picuris in 2025 is:

- Governor: Wayne Yazza
- Lieutenant Governor: Craig Quanchello

== Tourism ==
In 1991, the tribe opened the four-star Hotel Santa Fe and the Amaya Restaurant, serving Native American cuisine, in Santa Fe, New Mexico.

Located within the Pueblo are the San Lorenzo de Picurís church and the Picuris Pueblo Museum, which displays and sells the works of local weavers, potters and beadworkers. Picuris is particularly known for its micaceous pottery. Excavated dwellings are located within the pueblo. Self-guided tours and permits for photography within the pueblo are available to visitors. Visitors may fish for trout at Pu-La Lake by contacting the Picurís Pueblo Fish & Game and Parks & Wildlife. There are also picnic and campground facilities.

=== Events ===
Their major feast day is San Lorenzo's Day on August 10, during which people of all ages engage in races and the Sunset Dance held on August 9. There are Corn Dances and Buffalo Dances in June and August, which may be private ceremonies. There are also dances held New Year's Day and in late January and early February that are open to the public.

An Arts & Crafts fair of weaving, sculpture, beadwork, and jewelry is held the first weekend in July.

== Notable people ==
- Anthony Durand (1956–2009), micaceous potter
- Cora Durand (1902 - 1998), micaceous potter
- Maria Ramita Martinez (1884–1969) micaceous potter
- Joseph Rael (b. 1935), New Age writer
- Rosalie Simbola Aguilar (c. 1898–1947), potter

== See also ==
- National Register of Historic Places listings in Taos County, New Mexico
- High Road to Taos, New Mexico
