= Julien Durand =

Julien Durand may refer to:

- Julien Durand (footballer) (born 1983), French association footballer
- Julien Durand (politician) (1874–1973), French politician
