= Cora Durand =

Picuris Pueblo potter

Cora L. Durand
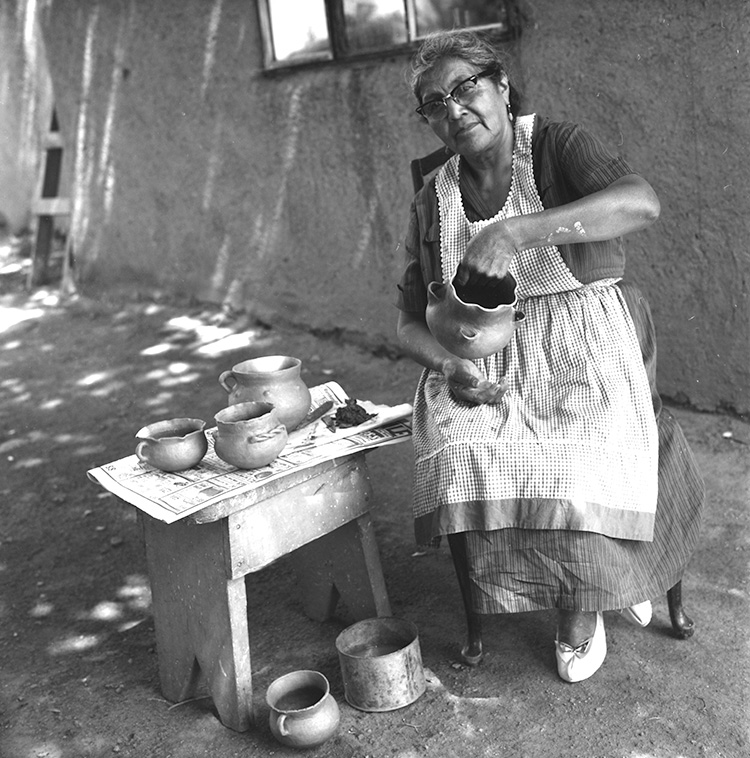
- Born: August 23, 1902; Picuris Pueblo, New Mexico, U.S.
- Died: January 23, 1998 (aged 95)
- Resting place: Picuris Cemetery
- Known for: Ceramic

Cora L. Durand (August 23, 1902 - January 23, 1998) was a Picuris Pueblo potter. Durand started working as a potter later in life, beginning in the 1950s. She helped maintain the traditional hand-built method for creating micaceous pottery. Her work is utilitarian and was meant to be used.

== Biography ==
Durand was born on August 23, 1902, in Picuris Pueblo, where her father, Miguel Lopez, raised her. Durand married Roland Durand in the 1920s and the couple had four children. Before she started working as a potter, she held many different kinds of jobs, including working for the Bureau of Indian Affairs, the Picuris Pueblo Day School, the Taos Pueblo Indian Hospital and in two different boarding schools in Towaoc, Colorado and Holbrook, Arizona. Her husband died in a car accident in the 1950s, which brought her back to Picuris. In Picuris, she began to work as a potter. Durand stayed active in the community, volunteering at the Picuris Catholic Church and involved in the Picuris Valley Home Extension Club.

Durand died on January 23, 1998. She was buried in the Picuris Cemetery. A historic marker in New Mexico celebrates her contribution to preserving traditional pottery methods, alongside other Picuris potters Virginia Duran and Maria Ramita Martinez.

== Work ==
Durand's pottery was intended by her to be used and was therefore utilitarian in design. She follows the tradition of the creation of hand-built, micaceous pottery which had been made for many years in Picuris and Taos. She sourced her own clay in the Picuris area. Durand's work had been influenced by potter, Juanita Martinez. Durand was part of a 1974 Smithsonian Institution exhibition, representing the Picuris Pueblo pottery tradition. She also exhibited at the Bond House Museum and Cultural Center in 1987. Durand's pottery was featured at the Arizona State Museum's 1994 American Indian Pottery Fair. Her work was featured in the Museum of Indian Arts and Culture in 1996.

By the 1990s, Durand was one of the last of her people working as a potter. She passed on her skills to her grandson, Anthony Durand, who started learning from her when he was seven years old.
