= Georges-Mathieu de Durand =

Canadian Christologist

Georges-Mathieu de Durand (died 1997) was a Canadian Dominican who specialized in patristics and Christology.

A professor at the University of Montreal, he was particularly known for his contributions to the Sources Chrétiennes collection. He published 13 bilingual volumes both alone or in collaboration with others, relating particularly to the Trinity (Hilary, De Trinitate; Basil, Contra Eunomium; and Cyril of Alexandria, De Trinitate Dialogi) and to Christology (Cyril of Alexandria, De Incarnatione, Quod Unus Sit Christus).

He was working on Nemesius of Emesa's De Natura Hominis at the time of his death.
