= Henry Strong Durand =

American songwriter and poet (1861–1929)

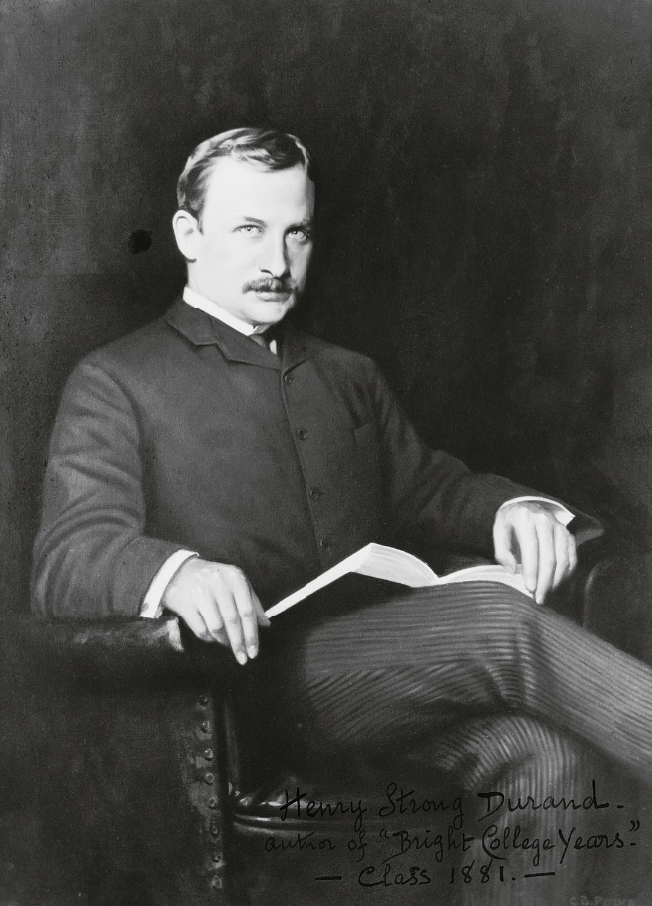
- Born: June 6, 1861; Cincinnati, Ohio, U.S.
- Died: May 8, 1929 (aged 67); Paris, France
- Resting place: Mount Hope Cemetery, Rochester, New York, U.S.
- Education: Yale University (BA); Harvard Medical School (MD)
- Occupations: Physician, lyricist, poet, park donor
- Known for: Writing the lyrics to "Bright College Years"; co-donating land for Durand Eastman Park
- Spouse: Harriet Blanche Robinson Best
- Children: 1 adopted daughter

Henry Strong Durand (June 6, 1861 - May 8, 1929), also known as Harry Durand, was an American physician, lyricist, poet, and civic benefactor. A graduate of Yale College and Harvard Medical School, he practiced medicine in Rochester, New York, before becoming known for two different legacies: writing the lyrics to "Bright College Years", Yale University's unofficial alma mater, and donating, with George Eastman, the land that became Durand Eastman Park.

Durand wrote "Bright College Years" as a Yale senior in 1881, setting his verses to the melody of Carl Wilhelm's German patriotic song "Die Wacht am Rhein". The song became one of Yale's most enduring traditions and is sung at university ceremonies, alumni events, and athletic occasions. In Rochester, Durand is remembered as a physician, landowner, and donor whose Lake Ontario property formed the original core of Durand Eastman Park.

== Early life and education ==
Durand was born in Cincinnati, Ohio, on June 6, 1861, to John Durand and Martha Boyd Stewart Durand. His father was a railroad manager whose work connected the family to several railroad lines, including lines in the Rochester region. Durand was the third of four children.

Before college, Durand attended Wilson's School in Rochester and then Hopkins Grammar School in New Haven, Connecticut, graduating from Hopkins in 1877. He entered Yale University with his brother, John Stewart Durand, and graduated with the Yale College Class of 1881.

At Yale, Durand contributed to student publications and became class poet in his senior year. After graduation, he spent several months in Europe and then studied medicine at Yale and Harvard. He received his medical degree from Harvard Medical School on June 27, 1888, after training that included work at Massachusetts General Hospital.

== "Bright College Years" ==
Durand's best-known work is "Bright College Years", written in 1881 while he was a Yale senior. According to Yale University archivist Judith Ann Schiff, Durand wrote the words after John F. Merrill, a classmate and president of the Yale Glee Club, asked him for a song for the club. Merrill supplied the tune of "Die Wacht am Rhein", a German patriotic song for which Carl Wilhelm had written the music in 1854. Durand returned with the manuscript soon afterward, and the song was arranged for the Yale Glee Club's senior concert.

The song quickly became a Yale standard. Yale Alumni Magazine later described it as Yale's "unofficial alma mater" and "the University's most-sung tune". A Yale University Library guide to the Yale Music Collection lists multiple early printed versions, including a 1906 version titled Dear Old Yale (Bright College Years) and a 1908 arrangement titled Bright College Years: Dear Old Yale, both crediting H. S. Durand or H. S. Durand '81 for the words and Carl Wilhelm for the music.

During and after World War I, the song's German melody became controversial. In 1919, the Yale Student Council recommended that it be dropped from undergraduate gatherings, but alumni sentiment and student practice helped preserve the song, and it returned to regular use in the early 1920s. Yale continued to refer to the song as an unofficial alma mater into the twenty-first century.

Durand also wrote other Yale-related verse and music. Yale's music collection includes The House of Old Yale, listed as words and music by Henry S. Durand, Yale 1881.

== Medical career ==
Durand returned to Rochester in 1889 to practice medicine. He lived and practiced at 87 South Fitzhugh Street with another physician. In the same period, he became active in regional medical societies. He was elected by the Monroe County Medical Society as a delegate to the Central New York Medical Association, was appointed out-patient surgeon at Monroe County Hospital in 1891, and was elected a fellow of the American Academy of Medicine.

Durand later served as president of the Rochester Pathological Society and became a lifetime member of the Medical Society of the State of New York. In 1898, he accepted an appointment as consulting surgeon at the Sisters of Charity Hospital in Buffalo. He largely stopped practicing medicine in Rochester after 1898, although he later resumed medical work informally while living in Mexico.

== Mexico ==
In 1909, Durand traveled to Urique, in the Sierra Madre region of Mexico, with Arthur Stilwell, initially in connection with mining interests. The local community soon learned that he was a physician, and Durand began treating villagers. Rochester History reported that there was no other doctor within 250 miles and that local residents came to call him "Nuestro Doctor", meaning "Our Doctor".

Durand spent about seven years in Urique, combining mining activity with medical care. In 1915, he was made health officer for Urique, and during a smallpox outbreak he obtained vaccine from Washington, D.C.; accounts of the episode report that several hundred villagers were vaccinated. While in Mexico he met Harriet Blanche Robinson Best, and the two married on August 9, 1916. They later adopted a daughter, Margaret.

The Mexican Revolution made the region increasingly unsafe, and Durand and his family left Mexico in 1916 after his recovery from a severe illness. They returned to the United States through Los Angeles, where Durand joined clubs and continued writing light verse.

== Durand Eastman Park ==
Durand had long wanted to own lakefront land near Rochester. He purchased a 270-acre parcel on the shore of Lake Ontario and moved in 1904 to a newly built house in Irondequoit, New York. With George Eastman, he later donated land that became Durand Eastman Park.

Monroe County's golf history for Durand Eastman states that in 1907 Durand and Eastman offered the City of Rochester a tract of about 484 acres in Irondequoit on Lake Ontario "to be used as a public park forever". The park began with Durand's lakefront property and adjacent land acquired with Eastman's help. The park later included a public golf course; records from 1929 indicated that a nine-hole course existed there in 1917, and the course was later expanded and redesigned.

Durand retained a life interest in several acres near his house and left instructions concerning the maintenance and use of parts of the property. His relationship with the city became strained after zoo construction and other park work affected portions of the land and buildings he had expected to preserve. In letters from the 1910s and 1920s, Durand objected to the removal of trees, the use of land near his house, and the failure to carry out parts of earlier agreements. Despite those disputes, he later expressed hope that future generations of Rochester residents would enjoy the park.

Durand Eastman Park remains a major public park in Monroe County. The county's current park guide identifies the area of Dr. Henry S. Durand's former campground along the Trott Lake Trail.

== Later life and death ==
In the 1920s, Durand and his family lived abroad. After his daughter Margaret went to study voice in Nice, France, Durand settled in Paris. In 1926, George Eastman and Durand's cousin Audley Durand Stewart visited him in Paris while traveling to Africa.

Durand died of heart trouble at the American Hospital in Paris on May 8, 1929. His remains were returned to Rochester, and he was interred in the Durand family plot at Mount Hope Cemetery on June 6, 1929, which would have been his sixty-eighth birthday.

== Papers and legacy ==
The Rochester Public Library Archives holds the Henry S. Durand papers, a small collection of correspondence dating from 1892 to 1932. The collection includes correspondence to and from Durand and a letter from George Eastman.

Durand's legacy is divided between Yale and Rochester. At Yale, "Bright College Years" remains one of the university's central songs and is used at formal and informal university events. In Rochester, Durand is primarily associated with Durand Eastman Park, whose name preserves the joint gift of Durand and Eastman.

== Selected works ==
- "Bright College Years" / "Dear Old Yale", lyrics by H. S. Durand, music by Carl Wilhelm.
- "The House of Old Yale", words and music by Henry S. Durand.

== See also ==
- Bright College Years
- Durand Eastman Park
- Yale Glee Club
- George Eastman
- Mount Hope Cemetery (Rochester)
