= Durand Eastman Park =

County park in Monroe County, New York

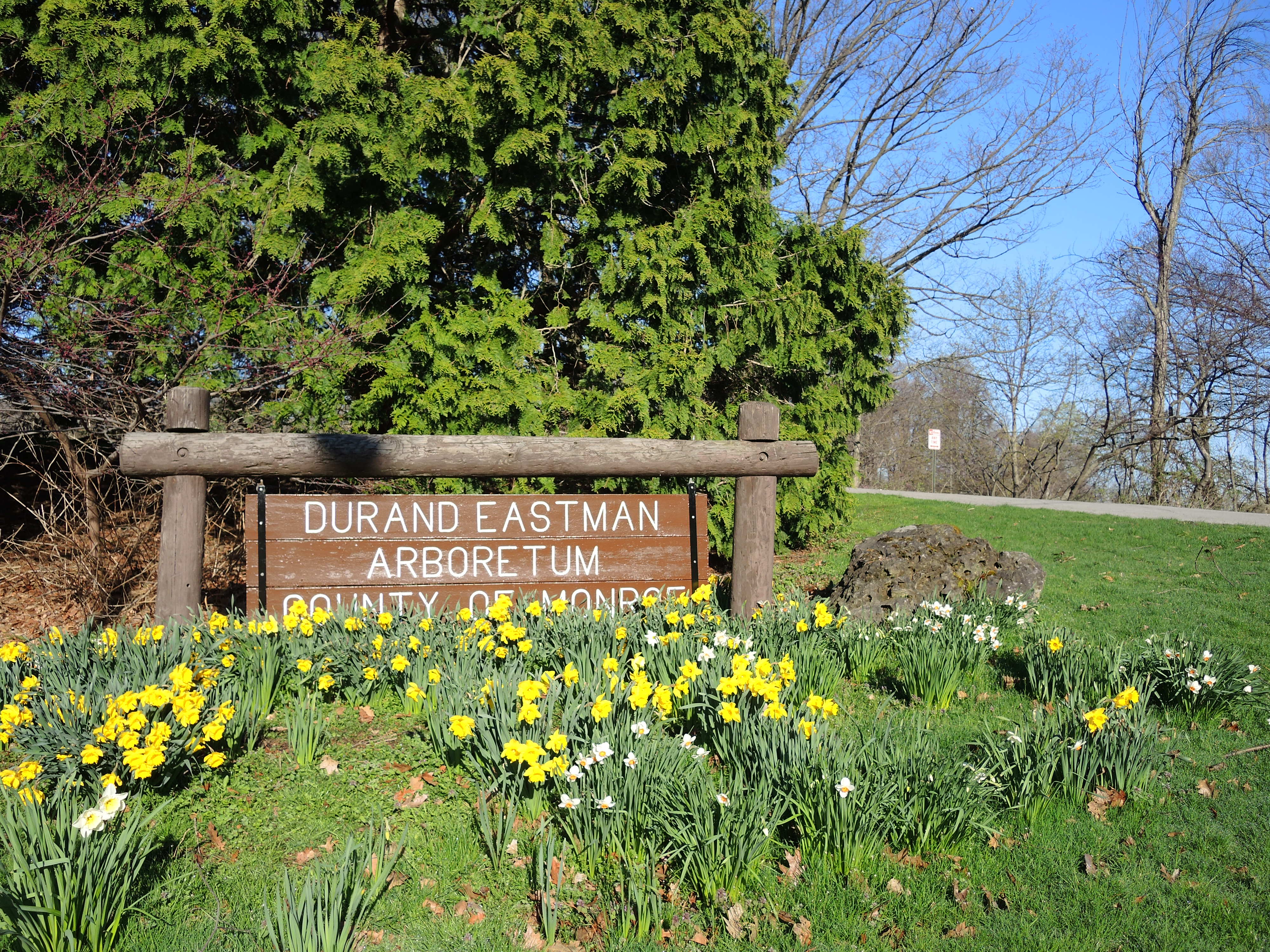

- Location within New York
- Type: Regional park
- Location: Rochester and Irondequoit, Monroe County, New York
- Nearest city: Rochester, New York
- Coordinates: 43.23101°N 77.56854°W
- Area: 977 acres (3.95 km^{2})
- Created: 1909
- Operator: Monroe County Parks Department; City of Rochester

Durand Eastman Park is a 977-acre (3.95 km^{2}) park located partly in Rochester, and partly in Irondequoit, New York. It is administered by the Monroe County Parks Department under agreements with the City of Rochester and the Town of Irondequoit.

== Geography ==
The 977-acre (3.95 km^{2}) park contains several lakes; the two largest are Durand Lake and Eastman Lake. The park's northern boundary is defined by 5,000 feet (1,500 m) of Lake Ontario coastline. The most commonly used parts of the park are within Rochester; the more remote areas are part of Irondequoit. The park is almost completely surrounded by Irondequoit, and is connected to Rochester by an easement.

== History ==
At the turn of the century, Dr. Henry S. Durand owned a summer camp in Irondequoit. He and his friend George Eastman saw a need for a public park in the area, and towards this end, bought a number of farms around the Durand property. On January 28, 1907, they offered their land to the city of Rochester, "to be used as a public park forever, a tract of land of about 484 acres situate in the Town of Irondequoit on Lake Ontario", thus giving the common citizen rights to nearly a mile of public beach and adjacent lands on the Lake's shoreline. One year later the land was transferred to the city.

Durand-Eastman Park was formally dedicated on May 22, 1909. Historically, the beach at Durand-Eastman was much wider than it is today. In 1915, bath houses were built on the lakeshore. They became unusable in 1949 due to rising water levels. The buildings were eventually demolished. There once was a zoo in the park, home to as many as 115 animals of the "hoof-stock" variety, such as buffalo, elk, deer, and goats. Opened in 1912 with private funds provided by Alexander B. Lamberton, then head of the parks commission, the zoo closed in 1962.

In 1961, the City of Rochester made a 99-year agreement with the County of Monroe to maintain, administer and regulate Durand-Eastman Park. This agreement was later modified in 1975, but forms the basis for Durand-Eastman being a county park. In 2001, the City of Rochester sold the 90.9 acres (36.8 ha) along the western edge of Durand-Eastman Park, commonly known as Camp Eastman, to the Town of Irondequoit. The city remains responsible for maintenance of the park's beach.

== Flora and fauna ==
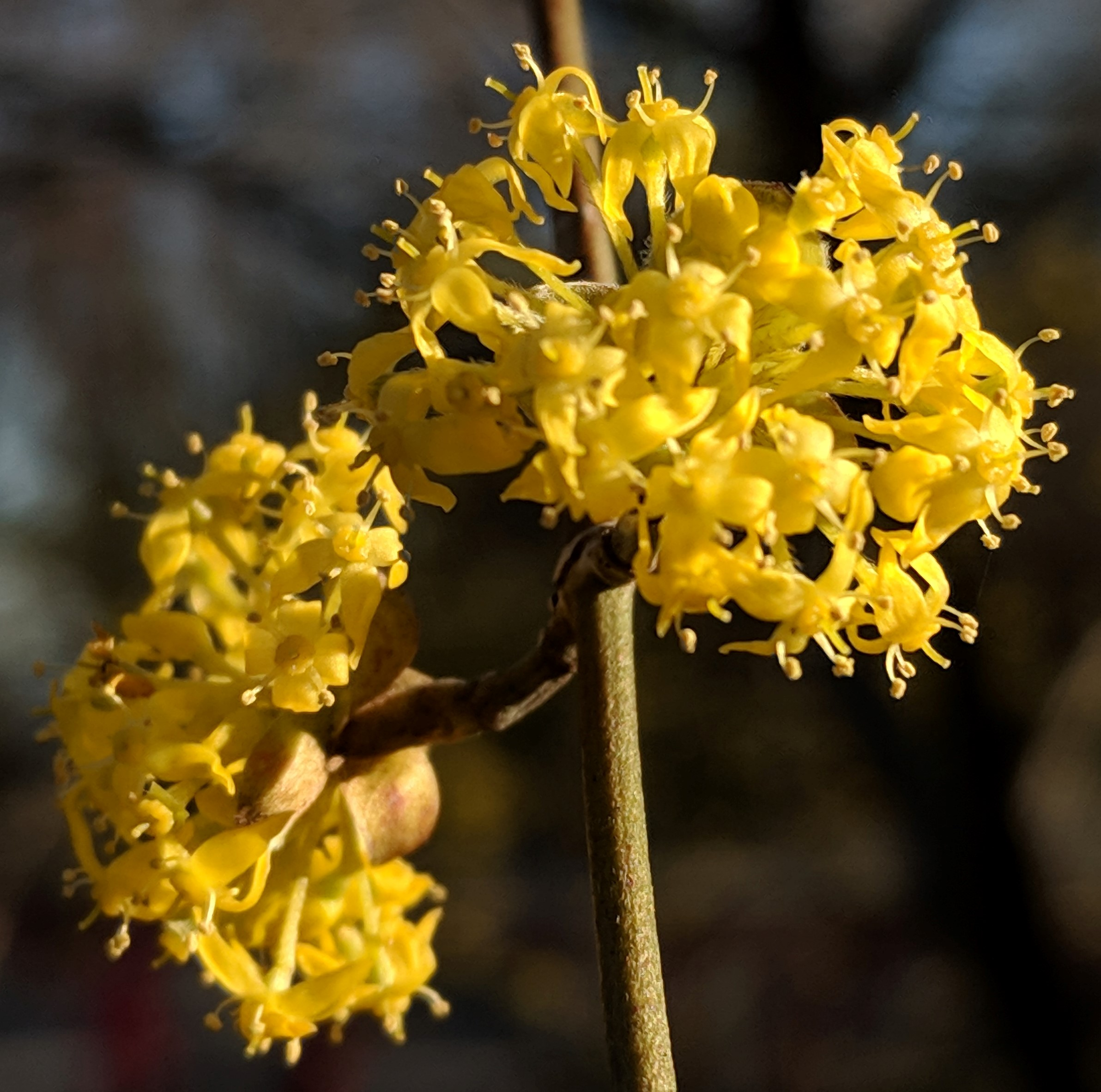
Cornelian Cherry Dogwood flowers in Durand Eastman Park

Durand-Eastman Park has a variety of trees and wildflowers. A 1937 source claims that the park "contains 395 varieties of native and foreign trees, shrubs, and plants." The park's Slavin Arboretum contains an impressive collection of trees.

Deer, raccoon, groundhogs, eastern gray squirrels, turkey, and chipmunks are common animals in the park.

== Recreation and facilities ==
The park has a municipal golf course, built as a 9-hole course in 1917, that was redesigned by Robert Trent Jones in 1933. Now it has 18 holes and a club house. There are hiking trails. Swimming was permitted at the park's Lake Ontario beach in 2006 for the first time in forty years. In May 2007, the beach opened for the second straight season with a slightly larger swimming area, extending an additional 25 yards (23 m) west. The beach is staffed by lifeguards, grounds-people, and security personnel.
