= Virginia T. Romero =

Taos Pueblo potter from New Mexico (1986–1998)

Virginia Trujillo Romero, or Pop Tő (September 1896–1998) was a Taos Pueblo potter and ceramicist from Taos, New Mexico.

== Biography ==
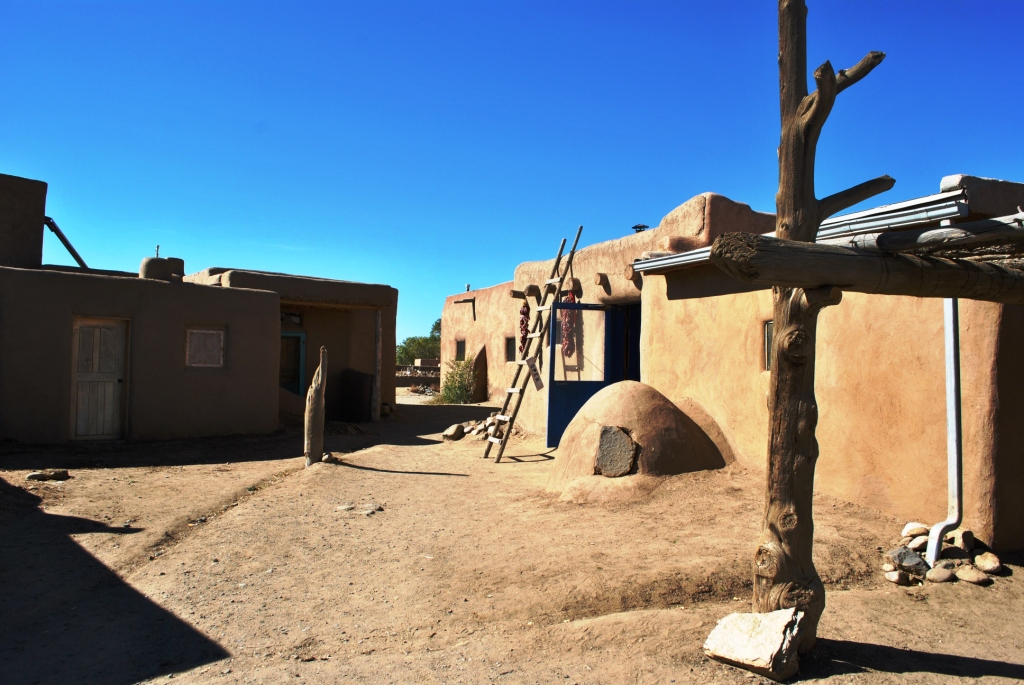
A view of the Taos Pueblo where Romero was born and raised.

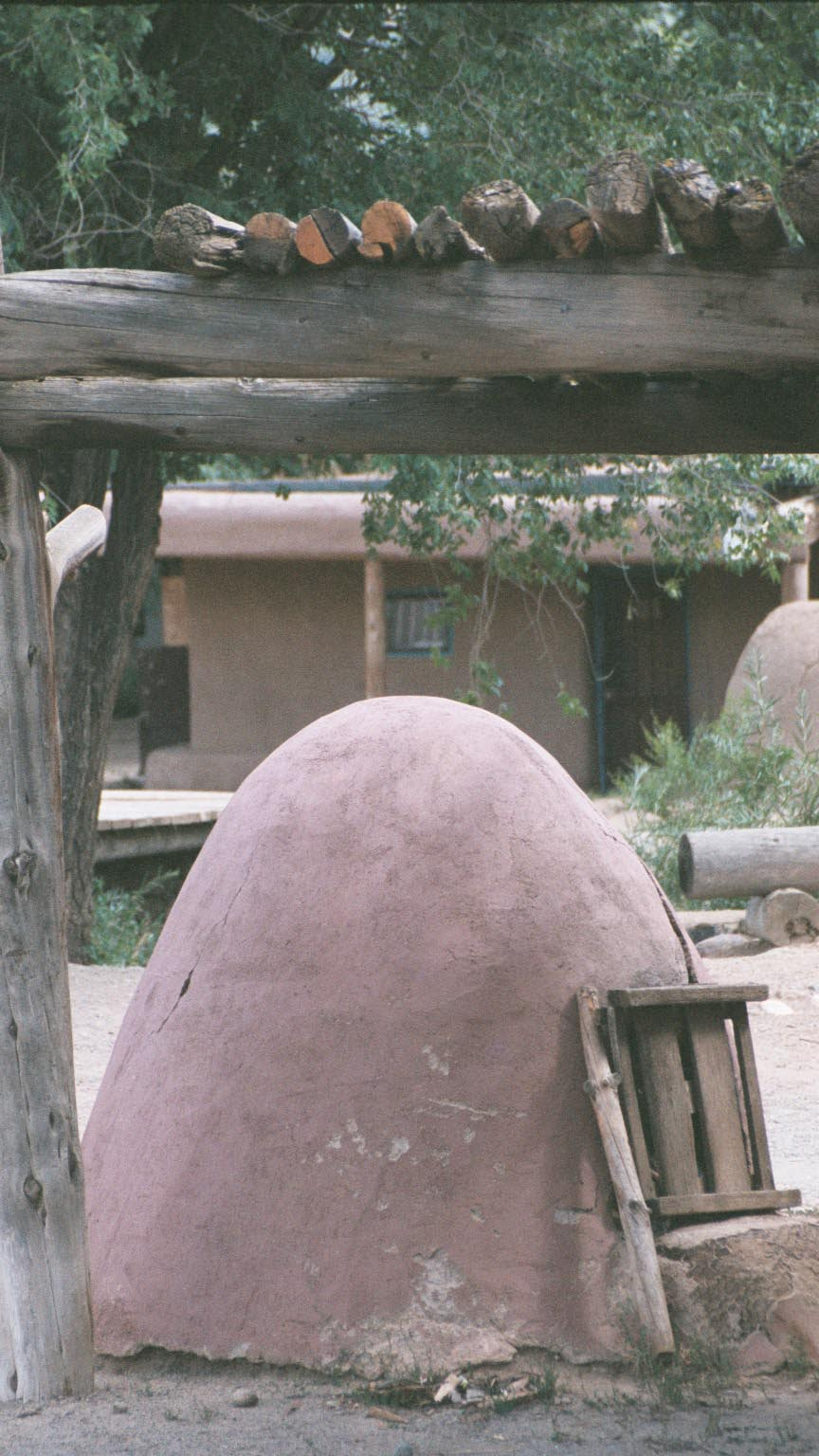
A traditional horno oven at Taos Pueblo

Virginia Trujillo was born at Taos Pueblo in 1896. She grew up alongside her tribe until the early 1900s, when she was taken from her home to undergo a forced assimilation program at the Santa Fe Indian School. At the boarding school, she as with the other students were prevented from speaking their own language or practicing their cultural traditions.

=== Potter ===
When she was growing up on the Pueblo she would watch her mother craft water jars, bean pots and dishes using the micaceous clay which formed the traditional ware of Taos Pueblo. In 1919, she began creating pottery after her father presented her a bag of clay, encouraging her to make her own as the skill would be useful for raising a family.

In 1920, she married José de la Cruz Romero. The couple had ten children. Trujillo Romero turned to her pottery to support her family, first creating traditional bowls in the simple unadorned styles of Taos Pueblo, later developing more refined designs for the tourist trade. By the 1930s, Virginia's pottery began to generate a following among collectors of Native American art.

For many years, she was one of the few traditional potters creating works at Taos Pueblo. In addition to creating pottery, she designed and built adobe fireplaces, used for cooking or for firing pottery.

=== Later life and legacy ===
Romero continued to make pottery until 1995 when she turned one hundred years old. She died in 1998 at age 103. Her daughter Catherine and her daughter-in-law Viola followed her footsteps and became potters.

In 2005, Virginia T. Romero was honored with an Official Scenic Historic Marker.

== Collections ==
- Micaceous Clay Bowl with Firing Clouds (#31). Dr. Samuel R. Poliakoff Collection of Western Artmat the Abbeville County Library System, Abbeville, SC.
- Buff-colored Bowl. Krannert Art Museum, University of Illinois.
- Virginia T. Romero, Taos Pueblo bowl. Gorman Museum of Native American Art. Davis, California.
