= Frank Durand =

American politician

Member of the New Jersey Senate from Monmouth County
- In office 1933–1939
- Preceded by: E. Donald Sterner
- Succeeded by: Haydn Proctor

Member of the New Jersey General Assembly
- In office 1930–1931

Personal details
- Born: March 9, 1895 Asbury Park, New Jersey
- Died: June 15, 1978 (aged 83)
- Party: Republican

Frank Durand (March 9, 1895 – June 15, 1978) was an American politician who served in the New Jersey General Assembly from 1930 to 1931 and in the New Jersey Senate from 1933 to 1938.
