= Louis Marie Raymond Durand =

French diplomat (1786–1837)

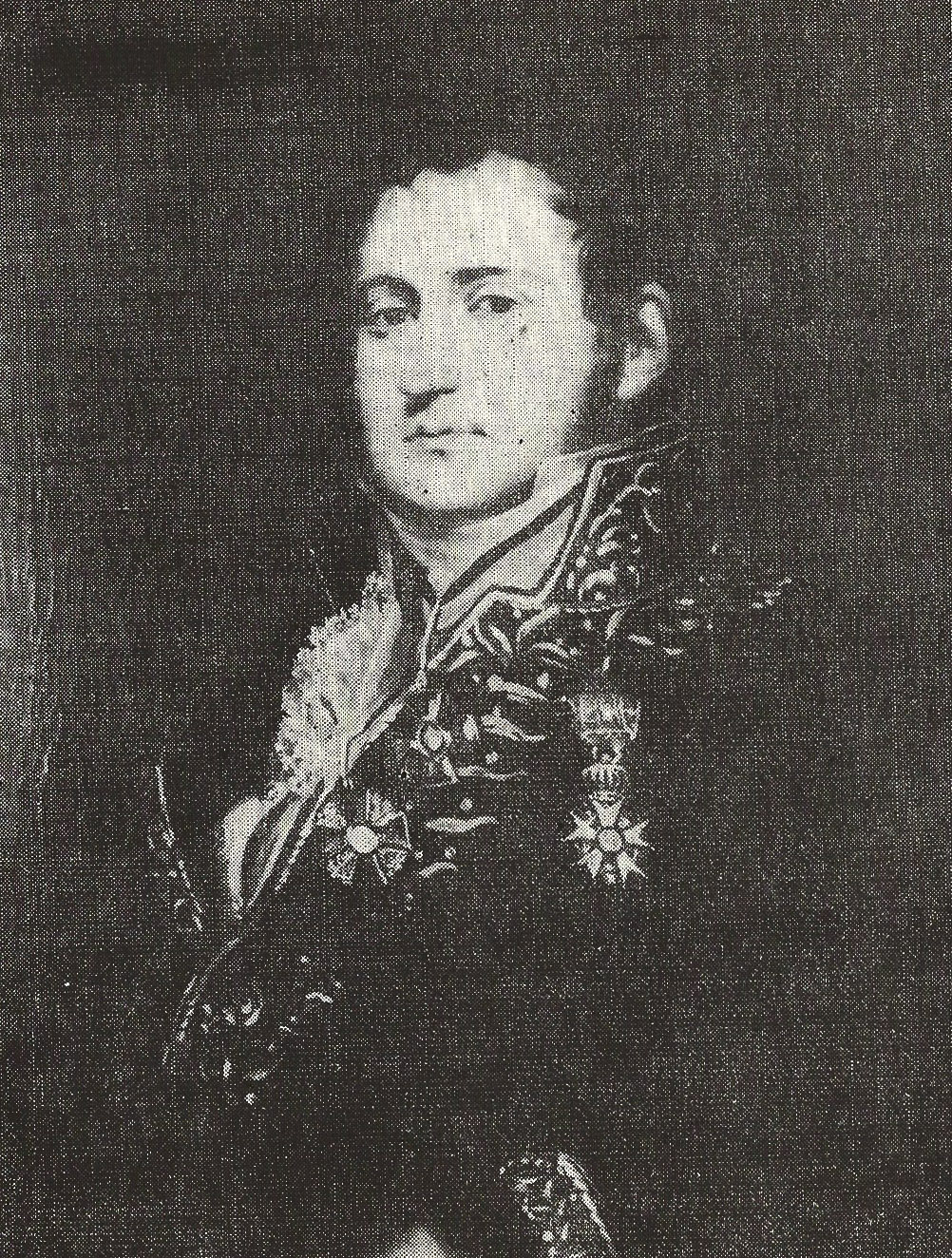
- Born: November 4, 1786; Montpellier, France
- Died: April 27, 1837; Lunel-Viel, France
- Occupation: Diplomat

Louis Marie Raymond Durand (1786–1837) was a French diplomat who served as a consul in Warsaw during the November Uprising.

== Biography ==
He was born in Montpellier on 4 November 1786 to a family of Jean-Jacques Durand, a local noble and civil servant, and Marie Pauline de Barbeyrac, daughter of Marquess of Saint-Maurice. His ancestors in 17th century started a prosperous grain trading company. By mid-18th century Raymond Durand, the diplomat's grandfather, was among the richest grain traders in the area and owned a sizeable fleet of merchant vessels. In 1733, during a serious famine, he brought 20 thousand sacks of grain and distributed it among starving inhabitants of the city. For this act in 1788 king Louis XVI granted him and his descendants with a noble status and a coat of arms depicting a merchant vessel.

During the early stages of the French Revolution, Durand's father was a prominent representative of local Bourgeoisie and was proclaimed the first maire of Montpellier on 25 January 1790. However, soon afterwards he sided with the Girondists and the victorious Jacobins sentenced him to death for the "crime of federalism" and executed him in Paris on 12 January 1794, during the Reign of Terror. His wife was also briefly imprisoned and their four sons sent to General Hospital of Paris orphanage. Following the Thermidorian Reaction they were released and allowed to return to Montpellier, but most of their family's property was confiscated.

Raymond Durand graduated from a local school in Montpellier and continued his studies at a trade school in Lyon. At the age of 21, in 1807, he was hired by his cousin, François Durand, to head a trading company in Barcelona. There on 14 July 1808 he married Josephine Cutita, a Spanish widow of a French officer. They had two sons: Marcellin and Alphonse, both born the following year. The couple separated in 1814.

Durand's diplomatic career started mostly by accident. After Napoleon's escape from the island of Elba French consul in Barcelona declared his loyalty to the French emperor and Louis Antoine, Duke of Angoulême, the commander of royalist forces in Southern France was surrounded with his forces. François Durand ferried him to Barcelona on one of his merchant vessels and recommended that Raymond Durand be named the new consul of France in that city. In 1816 he became the new consul in Porto in Portugal, where he spent eight years, until December 1824, and where he witnessed the Liberal Revolution of 1820.

At the end of 1824 Durand's cousins finally secured him a more prominent position of the French consul in Venice, he was also granted the Légion d'honneur. However, he spent there less than two years as in 1826 Charles X of France decided to give that post to certain Mimaut, who was originally scheduled for a post in Warsaw, but was able to switch it for a more prominent position in Venice. Durand obliged and on 19 July 1826 was named the new French consul in Warsaw, with a yearly salary of 11,000 French francs.

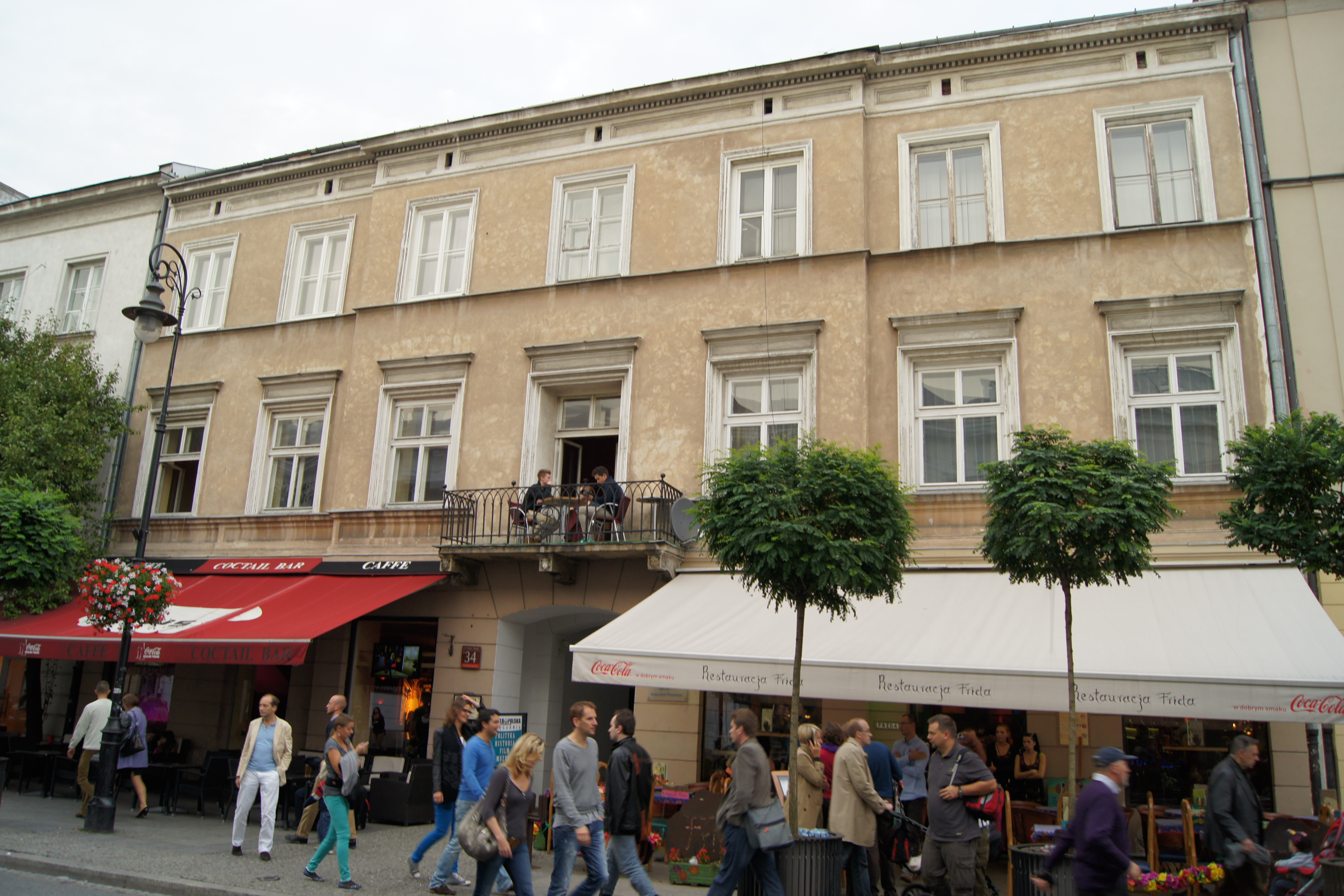
Nowy Świat Street 34, a building occupied by Durand's consulate in 19th century, modern view

In the spring of 1827 Raymond Durand visited Sankt Petersburg and on 20 June 1827 arrived in Warsaw. To organise a proper embassy, he soon rented a small house at Warsaw's Nowy Świat Street 34, consisting of eight rooms on two stories, a kitchen, two rooms for servants and a garage for two carriages. On 29 July he visited Grand Duke Constantine Pavlovich of Russia and was accepted as a new consul. During his stay in Poland he befriended many notable people of his epoch, among them Prince Adam Czartoryski, Nicolas Chopin, Philippe Girard and generals Piotr Bontemps and Jan Chrzciciel Mallet.

In April 1830 he intended to return to France to become a member of parliament in the upcoming elections, but eventually he stayed in Warsaw and the events of the July Revolution missed him. Despite power change in Paris, he was left in his office by the new monarch, though the new government initially distrusted him. Unexpectedly to himself, soon Durand became one of key French diplomats due to the outbreak of November Uprising in Poland. During the Uprising Durand informed his superiors at Quai d'Orsay of the situation in Poland at least three times a week. His dispatches were relayed by the French ambassador to Berlin, Charles de Flahaut and reached Paris usually in less than two weeks. When Russians besieged Warsaw in July 1831, Durand hired a courier to smuggle his reports across Russian lines, hidden in his underwear or in a horse carriage.

Since Poland broke all ties with the Romanov dynasty, Durand became a de facto head of a separate embassy. Although the Polish question became one of the most important political issues in Paris, minister Horace Sebastiani did not inform Durand of his plans and he had to infer French official stance on Polish matters from French and German press. He tried to convince Sebastiani to support a peaceful resolution of the Polish-Russian conflict on numerous occasions, but to little avail. Although mostly impartial, Durand allowed the Polish Ministry of Foreign Affairs to use his diplomatic channels to contact General Karol Kniaziewicz and Ludwik Plater, Polish representatives in Paris, and Aleksander Walewski, Polish consul in London. After the fall of the Uprising he also helped numerous Polish exiles to contact their relatives in Russian-occupied Poland.

Although promised a promotion to the rank of consul-general, the promotion never arrived. In 1833 his health started to fail. By the spring of the following year he started petitioning his superiors to allow him a six months leave in the south of France, but it was not until 10 November 1835 that he was finally relieved and left for Paris. There he met king Louis Philippe I of France. He settled in Montpellier for a couple of months and on 23 May 1836 returned to Warsaw. However, his health never fully recovered and already in November his situation became critical. Visited by his son Alphonse, Raymond Durand never received another permission to leave his post. During a banquet on 1 January 1837 he lost consciousness. Four days later he suffered a stroke and became paralysed. He regained consciousness for a short time and on 12 March 1837 his son decided to take him back to France without official leave. On 25 April both arrived in their family home in Lunel-Viel, but Durand lost consciousness once more and died two days later. He was buried at the Hôpital Général cemetery in Montpellier. In 1960s the cemetery was destroyed and his ashes were moved to St. Jean cemetery.
