= Anthony Durand =

Puebloan potter

Anthony Durand (1956–2009) was a Puebloan potter from Picuris Pueblo, New Mexico, United States. He was born in Cortez, Colorado and raised by his grandparents at Picuris Pueblo. He attended primary and secondary school in Peñasco, New Mexico and college at New Mexico Highlands University. When he returned to Picuris in 1976, he became intent on preventing the Picuris micaceous tradition of pottery from dying out. He had an excellent teacher in his grandmother Cora Durand. In 1976, Cora and Francis Martinez were the only ones making traditional Picuris-style pottery. With inspiration from his grandmother, Anthony was producing pottery on a full-time basis within a year.

The primary and most important source for gathering micaceous clay by Picuris potters was located four and a half miles east of their village. In the Tiwa language of the Picuris people it is known as “Mowlownan-a” or “pot dirt place.” This site not only provided the best micaceous clay source but also had deep religious and traditional cultural significance for the Picuris people who had been gathering clay here for over 400 years. During the 1960s when mining operations commenced in the area this important clay source was fenced in with the rest of the land mines making it extremely difficult for potters to access the site. By the mid-1990s the Picuris people had lost all access to the site of “Mowlownan-a” which is now buried under tons of waste rock from mining activities.

Anthony began to experiment with clays from other sources, as well as different techniques of burnishing and polishing. He used gray sandstone as temper, which gives his pottery a distinctive look. The Picuris area contains a micaceous material that produces a high luster when used as slip. Since the pottery of Picuris was traditionally made for cooking, it has no painted decorations but instead includes sculpted details. The greenish-gold cast of the pottery is unique to Picuris pueblo.

Using an old and unsigned Picuris pot as an example, he was able to reproduce the traditional golden color and high luster that has since become standard to his works. Pottery fragments from the ruins of the old Picuris Pueblo have also inspired some of his molded detail. He used cedar wood in his firing to achieve the gold finish.

By the 1980s, his pieces were being sold in shops and galleries as well as at the Santa Fe Indian Market and the Picuris Arts and Crafts Fair. He shared a booth with his grandmother Cora Durand at the Micaceous Pottery Artists Convocation at the School of American Research in 1995. Anthony received several awards and honorable mention at the Santa Fe Indian Market along with first place awards for traditional pottery at the Picuris Tri-Cultural Fair.

He died in 2009 at the age of 53.
