= William & Mary Pep Band =

Pep band at the College of William & Mary

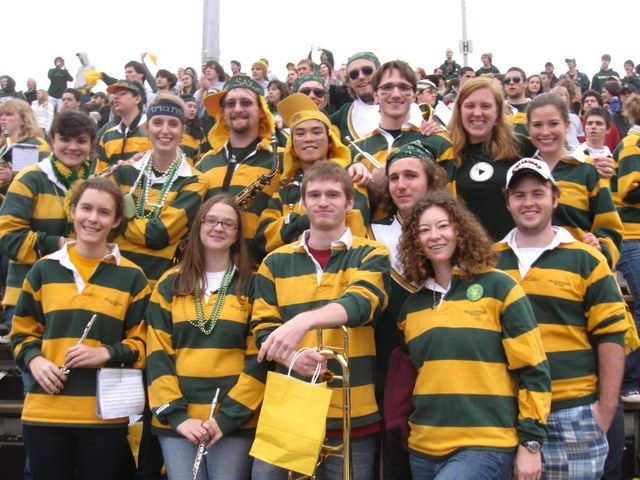
The William & Mary pep band members from the class of 2010 during a home football game in the fall of 2009.

The William & Mary Pep Band is the scramble band of the College of William & Mary. It is a student-run ensemble that performs at home football games in the fall sports season and basketball games in the winter sports season. Membership is open to anyone currently enrolled at the college.

== History ==
=== Before 1995 ===
The early history of the William & Mary Marching Band is generally unknown. In 1922 Cyrus Clemons Briggs organized the first band at the College of William & Mary. Throughout the 1920s, 1930s, and 1940s, there were various efforts to organize a marching band, each of which lasted for a few years at the most, and then collapsed. It wasn't until the early 1950s, with the coming of Charles R. Varner, that a marching band at William & Mary came to be.

Mr. Varner came to the College in the fall of 1953, as the new director of bands, and immediately started a reorganization of the way that the marching band was conceived. Now that it had a stable leader, the band began to flourish. In the '50s, '60s, and '70s, the Summer Band program, staffed by members of the William & Mary Marching band, provided an opportunity for high school students to get better with their instruments and better at marching.

However, when Chuck Varner left the College, the marching band began to hit troubled times. Diagnosed with cancer in the early 1980s, Varner was forced to retire after 33 years of service. A scholarship in his name was established by the Alumni Band Organization at William & Mary in 1989 and is awarded to an outstanding band student from any band ensembles. Varner eventually died in January 2002, after suffering from Alzheimer's.

After Varner retired, the Marching Band was re-created as a free-form "explosion style" band. This proved to be unsatisfactory to the College administration, who hired a new director of bands, Laura Rexroth. In addition to conducting the College's Concert Band and Jazz Ensemble, Rexroth was instructed to start up a traditional marching band once more. Membership rose from 17 the first year to 50 in the following years. Rexroth was able to acquire College support to purchase new marching percussion instruments in 1990, and new marching band uniforms for the 1993 Tercentenary celebration of the founding of the College. Although many at the College were in favor of the idea of a marching band, financial support for the ensemble was continually reduced from 1990 to 1998. Eventually, the administration agreed that a Pep Band would require less financial support and decided to officially change the Marching Band to a non-marching Pep Band that performed from the stands.

=== 1996–present ===
In the fall of 1996, the history of the William & Mary Pep Band began. It began as a similar institution to the Marching Band, in that it was a one credit class run by the Department of Music. Then, in the fall of 1998, the Athletic department took over the management of the Pep Band.

Under the leadership of Jason Maga, the Pep Band sat down with Athletics, the Student Government, and the Administration to work out a new direction for the Pep Band. With the support of these groups, the Pep Band started a flyering and mailing drive across campus and to all incoming freshmen. In the Fall of 1999, the Pep Band was reformed as fully student-run organization, under the directorship of Jason Maga.

In 2024, the band adopted its motto of "Chaos, Community, Tune." This motto resulted unintentionally, as these three words were the band's keywords for shape formation in the script of their halftime show on October 19, 2024. The show was created and conducted by Show Manager Ryan Lindley. Believing these words to be the perfect encapsulation of the pep band spirit, the band began to recite them at the end of each rehearsal and performance following the 2024 homecoming game.

In March of 2025, the band traveled to Austin, Texas to accompany the Tribe women's basketball team for William & Mary's first ever NCAA Tournament appearance. The Pep Band performed at two games, the first being a win against High Point University and the second a loss to the University of Texas at Austin.

=== Former directors ===
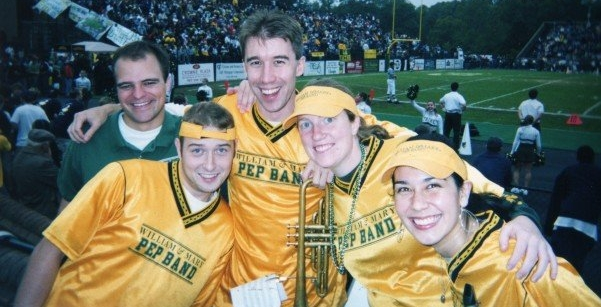
Former Pep Band Directors (L→R): Doug Bunch, Andy Kramer, Jason Maga, Rebecca Nelson, Diana West

Year	Name	Year	Name
1999	Jason Maga	2000	Doug Bunch
2001	Doug Bunch	2002	Carrilynn Greenwood
2003	Diana West	2004	Rebecca Nelson
2005	Andy Kramer	2006	Alex Mills
2007	Kenny Barry	2008	Dustin Glasner
2009	Christina Millson	2010	Christina Millson
2011	Kevin Deisz	2012	Kevin Deisz
2013	Carrie Sheeler	2014	Megan Flansburg
2015	Cody Jones	2016	Matthew McGuinness
2017	Dylan Schuler	2018	Megan Rouch
2019	Davidson Norris	2020	Brendan Switts
2021	Tate Stevens	2022	Wilhelmina Awan
2023	Natalie Bavos-Chen	2024	Allison Thorne
2025	Ethan Shoham	2026	Joey Calisti
2027	Katie Haas	2028	

=== Former Drum Captains ===
Year	Name(s)
2023	Charlotte West
2024	Charlotte West
2025	Josh Seagreaves & Ryan Lindley
2026	Josh Seagreaves
2027	Devan Waghray
