= Tiger Pep Band at DePauw University =

College pep band in Greencastle, Indiana

Tiger Pep Band
- School: DePauw University
- Location: Greencastle, Indiana
- Conference: North Coast Athletic Conference
- Founded: 1907/1995
- Director: Open as of Fall 2014
- Members: Open as of Fall 2014

The Tiger Pep Band at DePauw University (TPB) is a student-led, -organized, and -funded ensemble at DePauw University in Greencastle, Indiana. The band has been recognized several times among the best in collegiate sports, promoting sportsmanship and civility, and has been hailed as "best pep band in Division III athletics ".

== History ==
DePauw Bands began in the early part of the 20th century. The earliest incarnation of a DePauw Pep Band can be found as far back as 1907 when the newly formed band played for a "jollification" event for the first Old Gold Day (later to be known as DePauw's homecoming). The Tiger Pep Band's creation date (1907) would make it the second oldest "scramble band" in the country next to the Columbia University Marching Band which was founded in 1904. While never losing its purpose of bringing joy and support for DePauw, Marching Bands took over shortly thereafter and continued on in one form or another until its final performance during the Presidential Inauguration Parade in honor of Alumnus Vice President Dan Quayle, class of 1969.

During the later half of the 20th century, the DePauw Marching Band was led by Director of Bands and Alumnus Dan Hanna, class of 1947. Prof. Hanna, loved by his students, strongly believed that the Tigers playing on the field or the court should always know that regardless of the score, the musicians were always behind them. Hanna led bands at athletic events as large as 100 and as small as 15. Affectionately calling his marching band the Stumblebums, Hanna instilled a little zaniness into each performance including once having the marching band form the shape of a banana, begin peeling itself, all the while playing the stripper as they "stumbled" off the field during the Battle for the Monon Bell – which was televised nationally on ABC. He also created the long-standing "Tarnished Spit Valve Award" who he regularly gave to the largest "character" in the Stumblebums.

The DePauw University Band appeared at football games in 1993 and 1994 after an outpouring of requests by students, faculty, alumni, and fans that musical support to athletes competing on behalf of the university. No band performed between 1989 and 1992. The Tiger Pep Band was founded on September 9, 1995, and first appeared at a DePauw University football match against Albion College. The first student directors were Jason Dibler and Christine Russell, and were selected by Director of Bands Dr. Craig T. Paré.

The TPB continued the tradition, established by Prof. Hanna, by traveling to Crawfordsville, Indiana when it appeared at the 1996 Battle for the Monon Bell at Wabash College . However, it was not until 2002 that the band made its triumphant return to post-season performance, supporting the DePauw Basketball men's and women's teams in their NCAA championship runs in Ohio and Indiana. This was the first time since the DePauw Men's Basketball Team appeared in the NCAA Division III Championship at Calvin College in 1984 that the Band performed out-of-state.

Since its recreation in 1995, the TPB has become the leading cheering group for DePauw Tiger Athletics and has modeled itself in the form of a soccer supporter group. The TPB supports DePauw Athletics not only with music – both on field and from the stands – but also with chants (known as Spam), an assortment of signs, and a large variety of flags. The TPB's musical library has grown exponentially. Today, it can boast nearly five hundred pieces including DePauw's fight song, "Here's to DePauw," and alma mater, "A Toast to DePauw." The styles include rock and roll classics, top 40 hits, movie and TV soundtracks, and jazz standards. In the early part of the 21st century, TPB leaders believed it was time to revise the lyrics to the DePauw fight song in order to better represent the outstanding achievements of the university's women's teams. The reworded fight song was adopted by the university shortly thereafter and printed in the student handbook. It also created, named, and maintains the DePauw Athletic Mascot, Tyler the Tiger. Finally, as a way to show leadership and belief that "DePauw Never Quits", a member of the TPB leads athletic teams out onto the field of competition with a large, black flag containing a gold D. With this variety of music, as well as custom-authored cheers, unusual outfits, cooperative performances with other bands, and unique auxiliary units, the Tiger Pep Band was said by one out-of-state journalist to have a "Division I zaniness".

== Performances ==
In addition to performing for DePauw University's own football and men's and women's college basketball teams at home, the Tiger Pep Band has established a reputation for travelling on the road, which is somewhat unusual for Division III bands. In addition to annual appearances at the Battle for the Monon Bell between DePauw University and Wabash College, the band has been the official band of the Southern Collegiate Athletic Conference basketball tournament each year since it started in 2002.

The band has also performed for several NCAA tournaments following the Final Four appearance and subsequent third-place finish of DePauw's women's basketball team in 2002. When DePauw' team lost in the Final Four and the band remained in the stadium to play for the championship game alongside Rose-Hulman Institute of Technology's Rose Pep Band, it so impressed NCAA officials that they named the bands as the best in the nation in Division III athletics and invited them to return as the official bands for the 2003 national basketball tournament. These performances were selected among favorite Final Four moments by a journalist from D3hoops.com, a popular Web site covering Division III basketball.

Later, the Tiger Pep Band also appeared as the official band for the 2003 NCAA Men's and Women's Indoor Track and Field Championship and represented DePauw at the 2003 NCAA Tennis Championship. The band or its performance units have also appeared at non-DePauw events, including Greencastle, Indiana's holiday parade, at an Indianapolis Ice hockey contest, and Putnam County's annual Relay for Life event.

By virtue of their performances at NCAA and SCAC tournaments and the Battle for the Monon Bell, the band has appeared on several television networks, including ABC, ESPN, ESPN2, HDNet, and Indianapolis' PBS affiliate. They are regularly heard on WGRE radio.

== Membership ==
The Tiger Pep Band (TPB) is student-led, volunteer organization. Thus, membership has fluctuated during its tenure at DePauw University. At times, membership has been as low as 15 and as high as 100. The TPB is composed of two specific components: The Pep Band and the Tiger Team. The Pep Band, or the musician component, like many scramble bands, includes non-traditional band instruments called "miscie's" short for miscellaneous as seen in the Columbia University Marching Band and Stanford University Marching Band. In the past, members of the band have been known to play kazoos, Conga drums, vuvuzelas, bicycle horns, and other auxiliary noise makers, the band has even had a violin section and has included performers playing oboe, string bass, and electric guitar.

The Tiger Team is the designated cheering leaders of the TPB. Formerly known as the Tiger Maniacs, the Tiger Team was formally adopted into the TPB in 2001 and are non-musicians responsible for leading the group and DePauw fans in cheers, yells, and other activities. The leader of the Tiger Team is the Capo – a term known in soccer supporters groups for the individual who leads the cheers. Other members maintain the DePauw mascot, run teams out onto the field with Big D, and more.

Two groups that no longer are distinguished by their own designation are the Tiger Drumline and the Tiger Color Guard. The drumline appeared alongside and independently of the TPB from 2004 to 2006. The Drumline was not included in the 2008 revision of the TPB constitution due to insufficient participation to sustain the unit. The Color Guard began in 2006 and was a unique addition to a Division III athletic and stumble band. However, also due to lack of continued interest, it was discontinued in 2012.

== Traditions ==
=== Sportsmanship ===
The Tiger Pep Band has been recognized by NCAA officials and the media as an organization which displays a high degree of good sportsmanship, earning top honors in Division III athletics. This reputation has led to the band's invited appearances as the official ensemble of three NCAA national championship events and every SCAC conference basketball tournament since 2004.

When possible, the band salutes DePauw's opponents before contests by performing their school songs, continuing a tradition from its predecessor, the DePauw Marching Band. When appearing as the official band at SCAC tournaments, the Tiger Pep Band plays the fight song for each competing school before, during, and after the game.

Further, each year since the tragic events of September 11, 2001, the TPB has reached out and invited its rival Wabash College to perform the National Anthem together. This invitation was finally accepted in 2009 and has continued since.

=== BIG D and Spirit Flags ===
Early in its history, parents of members of the TPB donated hand-sewn spirit flags for band members to use while cheering their team. By 1998, band members had begun taking the flags during a 100-yard sprint on the stadium track whenever the DePauw football team scored a touchdown.

In 2000, the Tiger Pep Band added to its inventory "BIG D," an eight-foot square black flag featuring an old gold letter 'D.' Soon, BIG D was the flag that was used to escort the DePauw teams on to the field or court, and was carried in the 100-yard touchdown sprints, as well as in victory laps around the basketball court. BIG D was stolen by students from Wabash College in 2002. It was quickly replaced by a black bedsheet spray painted with a D, named "BIG D, JR." The Wabash administration agreed to pay to replace the original flag. Due to a manufacturing error, two flags were actually produced. One is known as "BIG D, III" and is also black flag with a (larger) gold 'D,' while the second flag is known as "DOUBLE D," and is the same colors, but is unusual in that the 'D' reads correctly left-to-right regardless of which side the flag is viewed from.

=== Field and Parade Performances ===
Beginning with the 2002 Battle for the Monon Bell football game, the Tiger Pep Band began the practice of performing the "Here's to DePauw" and the "Star Spangled Banner" from an on-field position. With the first performance of the next football season, the ensemble instated an on-field tunnel through with the DePauw football team runs when they enter the stadium, escorted by a Tiger Maniac running BIG D.

After the DePauw Marching Band's final performance at President George H. W. Bush's 1989 inauguration parade in Washington, D.C., no DePauw band appeared in a parade until the school's 2005 homecoming festivities. Celebrating its tenth anniversary, the Tiger Pep Band stepped off in the first Old Gold Parade in recent history. The event was successful and continues annually.

The band does not actually march, however, preferring to walk without trying to be in step. Called "stumbling" by band members, it is a reference to the DePauw Marching Band's nickname, "Stumble Society," whose members were known as "Stumblebums." (The DePauw Marching Band did in fact march in step, although the name was coined by then-Director of Bands Daniel H. Hanna, who conducted the bands at DePauw for over three decades.)

=== Inclusive and Cooperative Performances ===
After their performance experience with Rose-Hulman's Rose Pep Band at the NCAA Women's Basketball Championship in 2002, the two bands have established a performance relationship where they play as a single ensemble whenever the two schools' teams clash. The combined group performs both schools' fight songs. Although Rose-Hulman left DePauw's athletic conference in 2005, Rose Pep Band members still perform with Tiger Pep Band at the SCAC Basketball Tournament and at other events.

The band has also performed cooperatively with the University of Wisconsin–Whitewater Warhawk Pep Band and the University Schools Band of the Indiana Academy for Science, Mathematics, and Humanities and Burris Laboratory School from the campus of Ball State University, as well as with members of the bands from Rhodes College and Centre College.

In 2001, the TPB sought a cooperative performance of the national anthem with the rival band from Wabash College at the annual Battle for the Monon Bell football matchup. Wabash College finally agreed to perform the national anthem in 2009 and the two schools continue to do so.

=== Cheers/"Spam" ===
Early in the ensemble's life, band members would compose lengthy verses, which usually rhymed and contained words chosen to be awkward to pronounce. These were distributed to the band members who would cheer them on the way to the stadium and at other times during the game, frequently to the confusion of spectators who could not make out all the words. Often these cheers, known to band members as "Spam," were often customized to poke fun at specific opponents.

== Membership Recognitions ==
Since the Tiger Pep Band is a student organization, its members receive no formal recognition from DePauw University. According to the band's faculty advisor, Dr. Valarie Ziegler, motions in faculty meetings failed to give the band academic credit similar to that given to students in the DePauw University Band or the campus TV and radio stations. Instead, the band and its alumni ensemble counterpart, the Tiger Alumni Bands and Stumblebums, has established its own recognitions.

Although the practice has been reduced in recent seasons, the band's student leaders would recognize graduating seniors each year with "Extraordinare Awards" which were customized for each student, in the style of "Pep Band Poet Extraordinare" or "Pep Band Paper-Hat-Woman Extraordinare."

In 2002, the Tiger Pep Band began issuing its own varsity letters upon receiving consent from university officials. The letters were distinctive from the ones given to athletes, and were denied recognition by the university's alumni association. Students elected to suspend the varsity letter after three years due to this lack of official support.

To encourage continued support from the ensemble's graduates, the Tiger Alumni Bands and Stumblebums created two recognitions of its own. The "Non-Conformist" certificates recognize any alumni band participant, and are patterned after the DePauw Marching Band's traditional membership cards.

The "Colonel of the Tiger Pep Band" award is given to alumni and individuals demonstrating sustained support for at least ten years. Only four recipients have been named since the award was created in 2005: Tiger Pep Band founding director Jason Dibler, DePauw University Director of Bands Craig T. Paré, Tiger Pep Band faculty adviser and saxophonist Valarie Ziegler, and DePauw University Director Emeritus of Bands Daniel H. Hanna. The award certificate resembles the Sagamore of the Wabash award, the highest award given by the governor of the State of Indiana. The "Colonel" title was selected for its multiple significances to the band: It was Dibler's nickname, itself coined by Paré, and was also Ziegler's undergraduate mascot.
