= Columbia University Marching Band =

University marching band

Columbia University Marching Band (CUMB)
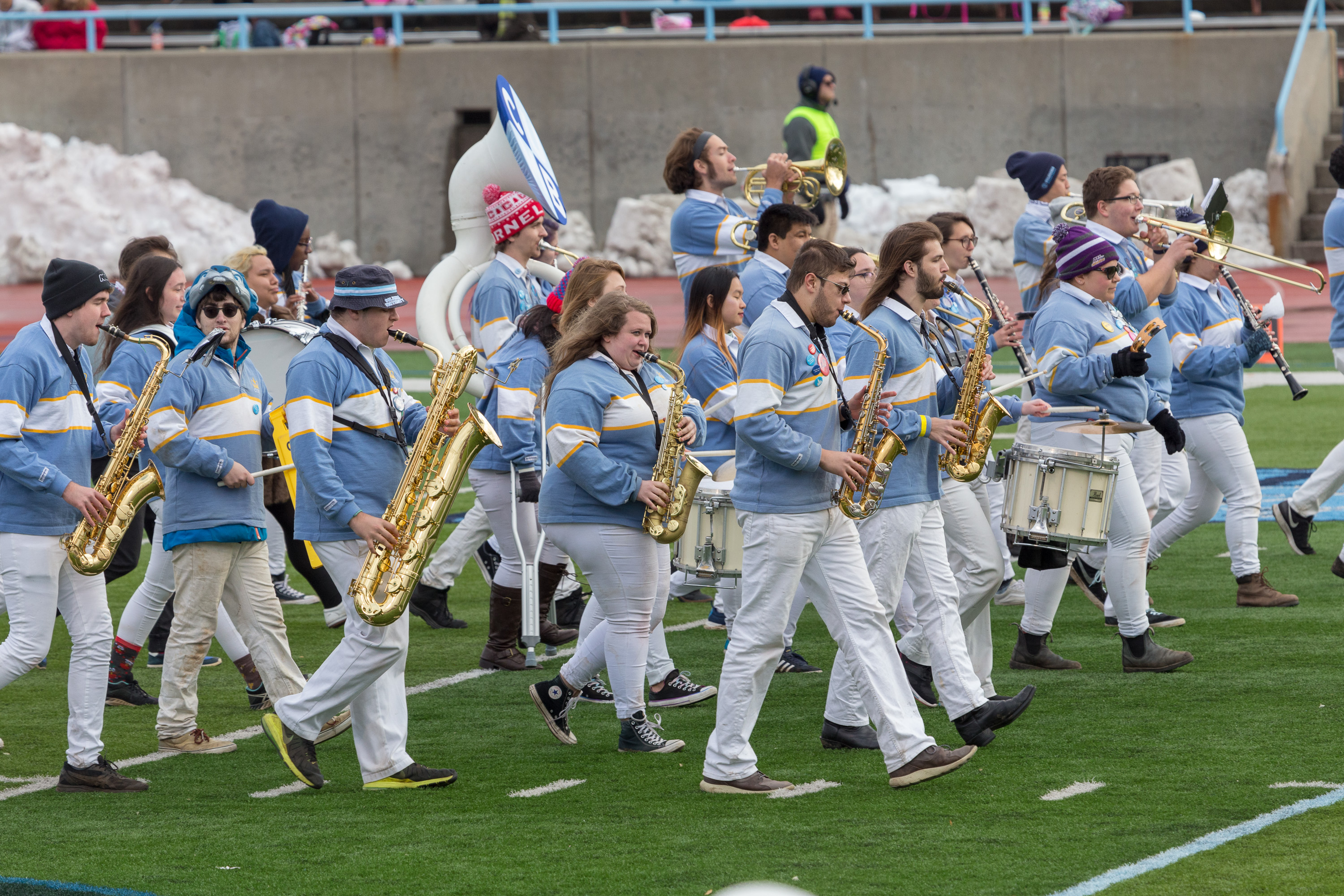
- CUMB on the field at Wien Stadium, November 17, 2018
- School: Columbia University
- Location: New York City, US
- Conference: Ivy League
- Founded: 1904 (defunct in 2020)
- Fight song: "Roar, Lion, Roar"
- Motto: "The Cleverest Band in the World"
- Website: CUMB

The Columbia University Marching Band (CUMB) was the marching band of Columbia University. The CUMB, which was entirely student-run, had a reputation for edgy humor and was known for its pranks. In 2019, the band was officially banned from Columbia athletic events and its funding revoked, although the suspension was undone a few weeks later. In 2020, following allegations of inappropriate behavior, the band voted to disband itself.

In 2022, Columbia Athletics launched a new spirit band, named the Columbia Athletics Pep Band, under the supervision of a band director employed by the university.

== History ==
The Columbia University Marching Band was founded in 1904, and converted to a scramble band format by the 1960s. As of 2025, all of the Ivy League bands except Cornell, as well as the Stanford Band, William & Mary Pep Band, and Marching Owl Band have adopted the scramble band style.

The CUMB, which was entirely student-run, had a reputation for edgy humor and was often thought to be the most controversial and irreverent of the scramble bands. CUMB billed itself as "The Cleverest Band in the World."

Since the 1960s, national news outlets have covered the band's most infamous pranks. Over the years, the band developed a "tumultuous history with the Columbia administration," leading to their dissolution in 2020.

=== 1960s ===
In 1964, the band performed a "Salute to Moral Decay," featuring a formation of "the upper part of a topless bathing suit" (all marchers left the field except for two sousaphones, while the band played "My Favorite Things") and a typically heavy-handed reference to Walter Jenkins, an aide to President Lyndon Johnson, who had been caught in flagrante delicto in a men's room.

In 1966, the band created a halftime show entitled "A Tribute to Birth Control" show where they formed a birth control pill, a calendar (for the rhythm method), and a chastity belt.

=== 1970s ===
In 1972, at West Point, the band formed what it called a "burning Cambodian village" on the field. The band has been effectively banned from ever playing at West Point again.

In 1973, a brawl broke out between the CUMB and the Harvard University Band over the alleged attempted theft of the giant Harvard Bass Drum.

=== 1980s ===
The band performed a 1981 halftime show at Holy Cross with the theme "The Lions vs. The Christians". Holy Cross administrators subsequently dis-invited the band from any future games played in Worcester. Columbia's next road game vs. Holy Cross in 1983 was the beginning of what became an NCAA-record losing streak; the Lions would go almost five years without a win.

=== 1990s ===
In 1990, the band received a bomb threat over its symbolic formation of a burning American Flag accompanied by The Doors' "Light My Fire," a reference to the recent United States Supreme Court ruling in Texas v. Johnson upholding the right to flag burning, and public debate around the proposed Flag Desecration Amendment.

In November 1993, the band drew parallels between the Holocaust and homelessness policies proposed by newly elected New York City mayor Rudolph Giuliani. The Anti-Defamation League demanded an apology.

=== 2000s ===
When Vice President Al Gore arrived to teach at Columbia in February 2001, the band later claimed to welcome him with a program solely consisting of Monica Lewinsky jokes, although a script from the performance does mention her by name.

During a game against Fordham University in 2002, the band joked that Fordham's tuition was "going down like an altar boy" (in a joke improvised minutes before the start of the pre-game show). In the ensuing media frenzy, band poet laureate Andy Hao was featured on the MSNBC show Donahue, in a debate with the president of the Catholic League Bill Donohue, who called the comment anti-Catholic bigotry. Additionally, The New York Times profiled the CUMB as part of an article about scramble bands. Columbia University president Lee Bollinger ended the controversy in one of his first official acts as University president when he apologized to Fordham president, Joseph A. O'Hare.

=== 2010s ===
Following a loss to Cornell in 2011, the band sang an altered version of the Columbia fight song lamenting the football team's winless season. After a member of the team coaching staff overheard the rendition, the athletic department promptly banned the band from performing at the Brown game the following week. Following this media firestorm as well as an outpouring of support for the band from various alums, students, and bandies, and an apology from the band, the Athletics department—in the interests of Columbia's "core free speech values"—allowed the band to perform at the season's final game.

In December 2012, a promotional flyer for Orgo Night which featured a pun on "Gaza Strip", i.e. "Everyone Wants a Piece" was met with some backlash by student groups on campus as well as activist Sherry J. Wolf. Subsequently, Kevin Shollenberger, Dean of Student Affairs, criticized the band via a student-wide email. In the wake of the event, despite the few protestors who attended Orgo Night, the band received overwhelming support from the Columbia community.

In September 2019, the band was officially banned from Columbia athletic events and its funding revoked, with many pointing to the administration's distaste for the band following the Orgo Night controversy. The band was reinstated a month later, in time for Homecoming.

=== 2020 Dissolution ===
On September 14, 2020, following allegations of inappropriate behavior, the band voted to disband. The band's leadership issued a statement acknowledging decades of "racism, cultural oppression, misogyny, and sexual harassment" and, deciding that it would be "impossible to reform an organization so grounded in prejudiced culture and traditions," decided to disband the organization.

== Performances ==
The CUMB appeared on many television programs including an October 1963 episode of The Tonight Show Starring Johnny Carson, The Howard Stern TV Show on WWOR in 1991, the Late Show with David Letterman in 1994, and MTV's Total Request Live in December 2002. They also appeared in the 1985 film Turk 182!

In addition to playing at every Columbia football game, the band played in the stands at Levien Gymnasium for Columbia basketball games and also regularly performed at the post office located in the James A. Farley Building at 34th Street on Tax Day. They also played Cee Lo Green's "Fuck You" outside of Trump Tower on election night 2016.

=== Orgo Night (1975–2019) ===
In one of the school's longest-lasting traditions, begun in 1975, at midnight before the Organic Chemistry exam—often the first day of final exams—the Columbia University Marching Band invaded and briefly occupied the main undergraduate reading room in Butler Library to distract and entertain studying students with some forty-five minutes of raucous jokes and music, beginning and ending with the singing of the school's fight song, "Roar, Lion, Roar". After the main show before a crowd that routinely began filling the room well before the announced midnight start time, the Band led a procession to several campus locations, including the residential quadrangle of Barnard College for more music and temporary relief from the stress of last-minute studying.

In December 2016, following several years of sporadic complaints by students who said that some Orgo Night scripts and advertising posters left them "triggered" and "traumatized" and called for the show to be canceled, as well as a New York Times article on the Band's treatment of sexual assault on campus, University administrators banned the Marching Band from performing its Orgo Night show in the traditional Butler Library location. Protests and accusations of censorship followed, but University President Lee Bollinger maintained that complaints and publicity about the shows had "nothing to do with" the prohibition. In subfreezing weather, the Band instead performed—at midnight, as usual—outside the main entrance of Butler Library.

The Band's official alumni organization, the Columbia University Band Alumni Association, registered protests with the administration, and an ad hoc group of alumni writing under the name "A. Hamiltonius" published a series of pamphlets exhaustively addressing the issue, but at the end of the spring 2017 semester the university administration held firm, prompting the Marching Band to again stage its show outside the building. For Orgo Night December 2017, Band members quietly infiltrated the Library with their musical instruments during the evening and popped up at midnight to perform the show inside despite the ban.

Prior to the spring 2018 exam period, the administration warned the group's leaders against a repeat and restated the injunction, warning of sanctions; the Band again staged its Orgo Night show in front of the library. Additional performances outside the library were held in December 2018 and May 2019.

=== Miscellaneous Instruments ===
One innovation of the CUMB was the introduction of the "miscie," which rhymes with "whiskey" and is short for miscellaneous. While many of the band members carried a musical instrument onto the field, the band's miscies carry whatever they choose. Some miscie instruments of the past have included a washboard, spoons, juggled balls/pins, the Game Boy Advance, the ROLM phone, beer bottles, spare tires, steel mailboxes, condom harp, football stadium bench (no longer attached to the stadium), passenger handle from the interior of an MTA Redbird subway car, unicycle, and kitchen sink. Towards the end of the Band, the miscie section had a toilet seat player. Other instruments have included the shofar, the E♭ contrabass sarrusophone, a didgeridoo (the didge), and the B♭ lenthopipe (an 8-foot length of electrical conduit, with rubber hose and horn mouthpiece at the bottom end, and funnel at the extreme end).

Band members had a long history of raiding competitive Ivy League schools and other institutions for memorabilia, including flags of Princeton University, University of Pennsylvania and University of California, Berkeley and the outsized stick used to beat the Harvard University Band's iconic giant bass drum. In a guerrilla action, the band once surreptitiously switched its regular dress for the dark blue of Yale University and appeared in the Yale Bowl as the Yale Precision Marching Band.

== Pep Band Revival ==
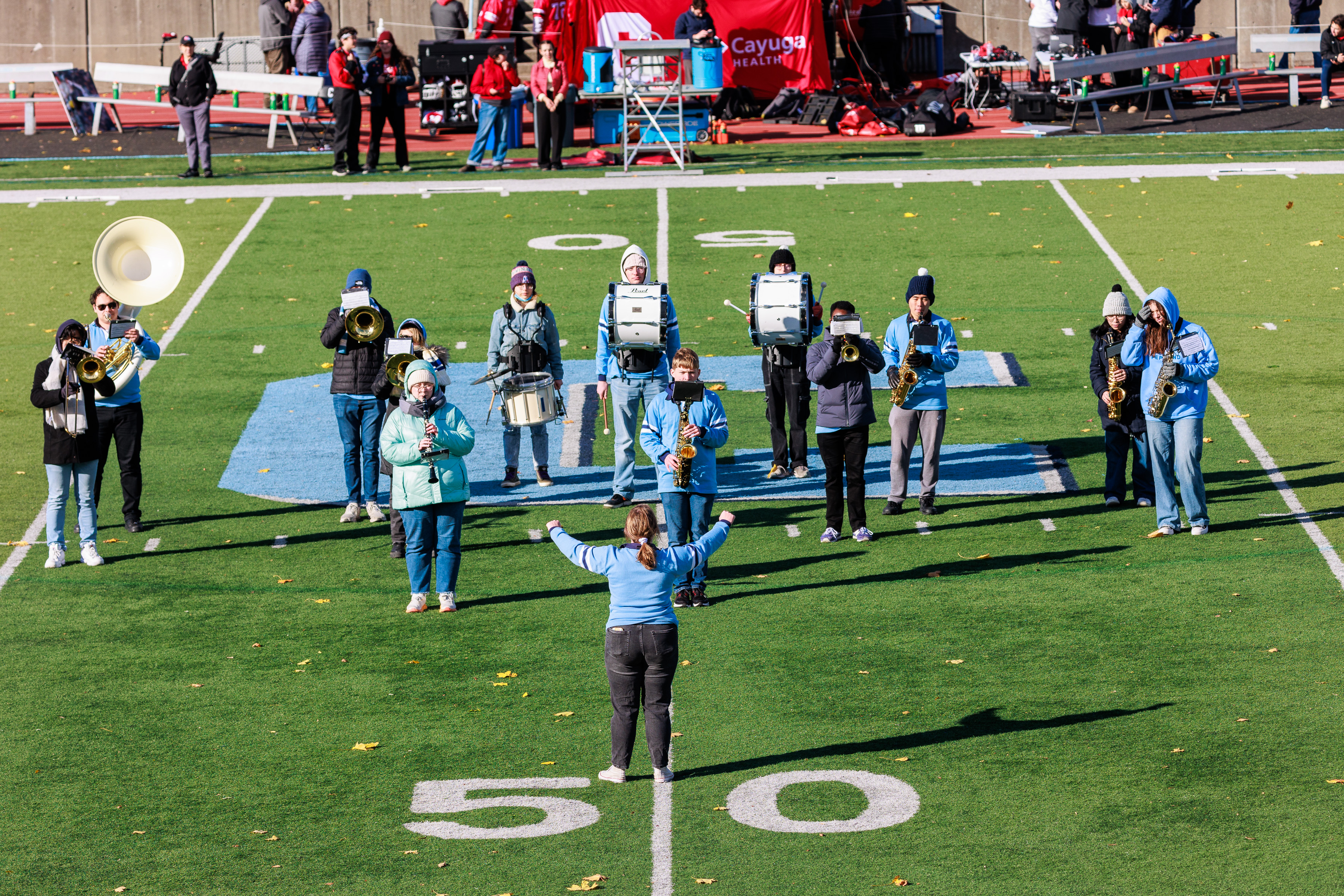
The reconstituted Pep Band in 2024

In Fall 2022, Columbia Athletics launched a new spirit band, under the supervision of a director employed by the university. Rather than being student-run, the reconstituted band is now managed with input from both the Columbia Athletics marketing office and the Columbia University Band Alumni Association. In its first year, the new Pep Band attracted about 25 undergraduate and graduate students. The pep band plays at football games and men's and women's basketball games, as well as other local events.

== Bibliography ==
- Lisa Birnbach's New and Improved College Book, by Lisa Birnbach (1992) ISBN 0-671-79289-X
