= Liberty Cup =

College football trophy, U.S.

- Columbia Lions Fordham Rams
- Sport: Football
- First meeting: October 25, 1890; Columbia 40, Fordham 0
- Latest meeting: September 19, 2015; Fordham 44, Columbia 24
- Stadiums: Jack Coffey Field (Fordham) Wien Stadium (Columbia)
- Trophy: Liberty Cup (September 21, 2002)

Statistics
- Total meetings: 24
- All-time series: Tied 12–12
- Trophy series: Fordham leads, 10–4
- Largest victory: Fordham, 52–7 (2013)
- Longest win streak: Fordham, 6 (2010–2015)
- Current win streak: Fordham, 6 (2010–2015)

Locations of Columbia and Fordham

The Liberty Cup is a trophy awarded to the winner of the college football game between Columbia University and Fordham University, two National Collegiate Athletic Association (NCAA) Division I football programs in New York City. The cup was awarded annually from 2002 to 2015, but the two teams have not met since then.

The trophy was dedicated a year after the Columbia-Fordham game was postponed following the attacks of September 11, 2001. At least 43 Columbia alumni and 39 Fordham alumni and students died at the World Trade Center. They included two former Fordham football players, Nick Brandemarti, a member of the class of 2000, and Kevin Szocik, a 1997 graduate. Columbia ended the crosstown rivalry series after a run of losses in the 2010s.

== Background ==
Columbia, based in Upper Manhattan, and Fordham, based in The Bronx, today represent two of the three Division I football teams in New York City; Wagner College, on Staten Island, is the third. In the early days of college football, they were two of the three nationally prominent teams in New York City, with New York University being the third.

Despite their proximity and long football histories, however, the schools met only three times in the 100 years up to 1990. The first matchup took place in 1890, and another followed in 1902. Both contests were lopsided shutout wins by Columbia. Columbia had been one of the first universities to sponsor a football team, and the Blue and White, along with other future Ivy League teams, were among the nation's leaders in the early decades of the 20th century.

The two teams did not meet again for several decades, even after Fordham joined Columbia in the NCAA's "major" level, equivalent to today's Division I, in 1928. Aside from 1943–1945 hiatus due to World War II, Fordham remained a major program until the 1954 season. It pursued a national schedule, however, rather than meeting "Ancient Eight" teams like Columbia. After a string of losing seasons both athletically and financially, Fordham folded its football program in 1954.

A renewal of the rivalry became possible only in 1970, when Fordham reintroduced varsity football, at what is now known as the Division III level. Columbia, along with the rest of the Ivy League, still played at what is now known as the NCAA Division I Football Bowl Subdivision level. Nonetheless, the Columbia scheduled Fordham in 1972 as a replacement for Buffalo which had temporarily terminated its football program. Like their previous two contests, the 1972 affair also ended in a lopsided shutout win for the Lions. Again, competing at different levels kept the schools from establishing a series.

This changed in the 1980s. Columbia, along with the rest of the Ivy League, was relegated to the new Division I-AA (now known as NCAA Division I Football Championship Subdivision) after the 1981 season. Fordham moved up to I-AA prior to the 1989 season. This put the 1991 encounter between the two on a more even footing. Fordham won that fourth meeting by a 20-16 score. Columbia gained revenge in sweeping the next four contests, which were played in 1992, 1993, 1994 and 1996. After a brief hiatus, the two renewed their series in 2000, typically as Columbia's season opener and the third game on Fordham's schedule.

== Origin Of the Liberty Cup ==
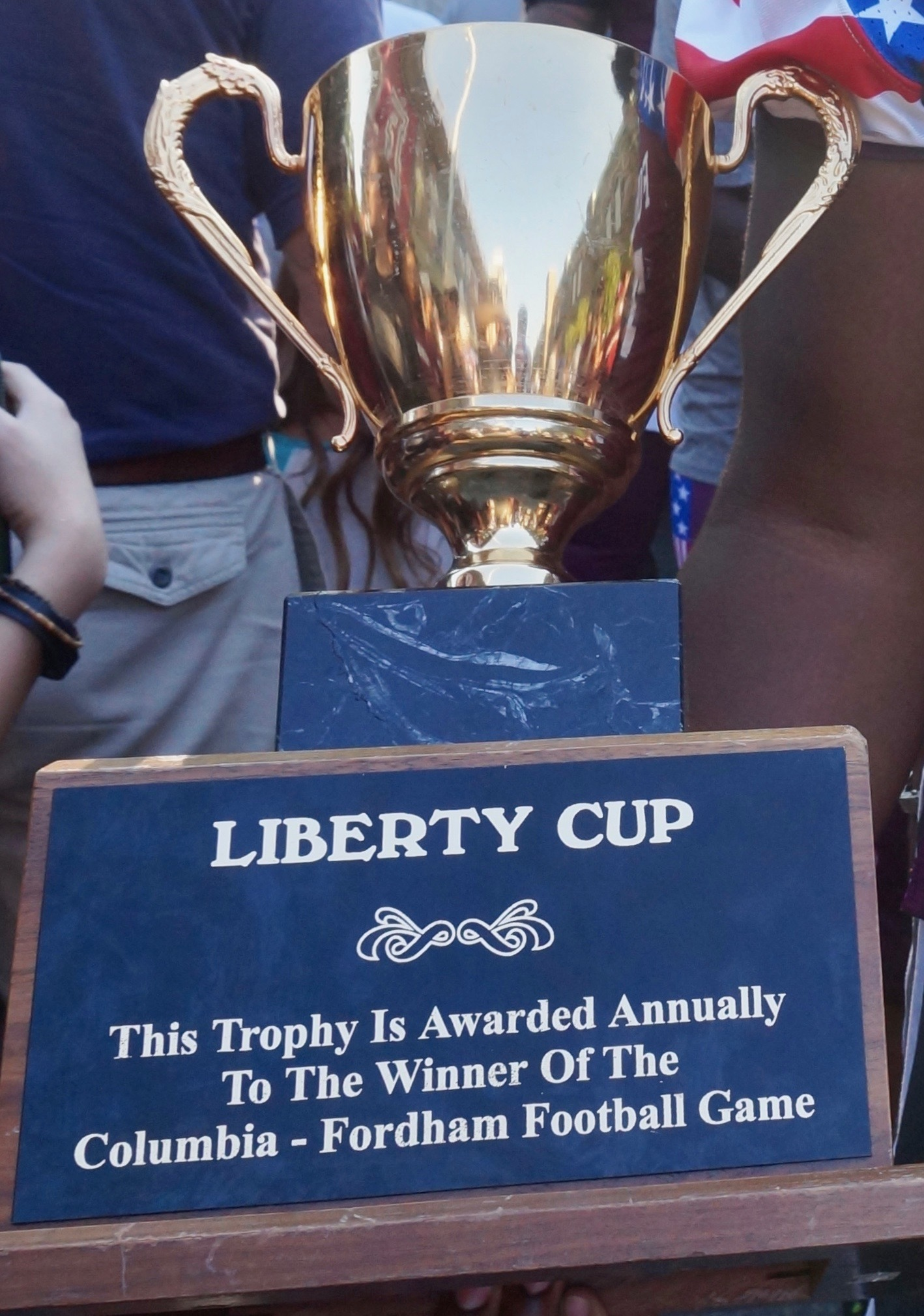
Liberty Trophy in 2015

The 10th meeting between Fordham and Columbia originally was scheduled for September 15, 2001. In the days following the September 11, 2001 attacks, Major League Baseball, the National Football League and many NCAA Division I teams canceled games for the following weekend. But Fordham and Columbia — the only Division I football teams in New York City at the time — debated as late as Friday, September 14, about the possibility of playing. Fordham officials wanted to send a message about American resilience in the face of the attacks, but Columbia officials argued that it was too soon to think about playing a football game. "The question was, should we not play and mourn and honor our dead, or was normalcy in the face of this disaster the best response?" said the Rev. Joseph A. O'Hare, president of Fordham at that time.

The schools decided against playing on Sept. 15, but later in the season agreed to meet on Thanksgiving morning, November 22. Fordham thumped Columbia 41-10 before a surprisingly ample crowd, considering the holiday and early start time. Afterward, O'Hare said it had been the right decision to reschedule. "Oh, absolutely," he said. "I think we had put sports in perspective – and we played great."

Less than 10 months after that game, the underdog Lions gained their revenge, holding Fordham close for 59 minutes before winning with a 37-yard field goal with 10.5 seconds to play. This September 2002 matchup was the inaugural Liberty Cup game. The 13-11 victory was Columbia’s only win of the 2002 season; Fordham finished 10-3, gaining a share of the Patriot League title and reaching the quarterfinals of the NCAA Football Championship Subdivision playoffs.

== Altar boy joke controversy ==
The Columbia University Marching Band drew protests from Fordham and Roman Catholics generally with an off-color double entendre reference to the priest abuse scandal during its halftime performance at the inaugural 2002 Liberty Cup game, when the Columbia band's self-proclaimed "Poet Laureate" read from a script over the stadium's public address system:

"As well as the Mets' season going up in smoke, Fordham tuition going down like an altar boy, and the Fordham football team with a threat rating of a cute, neon pink, the band now presents an all-star gala halftime salute to more Columbia news."

In reporting the incident, The New York Times, the Associated Press, and most of the mainstream media found the reference to be too insensitive or offensive and refused to print it. Columbia President Lee C. Bollinger apologized for the band's remark. The author of the joke refused to apologize.

== Series history ==
The 2003 game was a thriller, with Fordham coming out on top in a wild 37-30 game. Jerry Glanville was the color broadcaster for that game for TV as a part of the now-defunct Football Network. After CBS executives saw his work on that game, he was offered a chance to call an NFL game the following week, the Detroit Lions–San Diego Chargers game.

Columbia took the 2006 meeting, 37-7, in the most lopsided result of the cup series until Fordham defeated Columbia 52-7 in 2013. The 2006 win was the Lions' second consecutive victory over Fordham, and made Norries Wilson the first Columbia coach since Aldo T. "Buff" Donelli to win his debut. Fordham responded by winning eight of the next nine matchups.

== Hiatus ==
In 2014, after Columbia concluded a second consecutive 0–10 season, Columbia President Lee Bollinger commissioned former Boston University football head coach Rick Taylor to review the program. The following year, Taylor recommended Columbia improve its athletic facilities, increase salaries and discontinue the Fordham series. He based the recommendation partly on differences between the Ivy League and the Patriot League: a later start to the season for Ivy teams like Columbia, and the ability to offer athletic scholarships for Patriot teams like Fordham.

"They should not play Fordham when Fordham has three games and scholarships under their belt," Taylor said. "I'd take Fordham on anytime in the middle of the season when I got games under my belt."

Columbia did not schedule Fordham after 2015.

"I would hope that some time in the next decade, Fordham comes back on the schedule," Taylor said. "Because that will prove that we were alright, and Columbia has succeeded." As of the 2023 season Columbia has yet to face Fordham again.

== Pre-Liberty Cup results ==
Columbia held an 8–2 series lead, including meetings going back to the 19th century, before the Liberty Cup was dedicated:

Columbia victories	Fordham victories

No.	Date	Location	Winner	Score	Attendance and Source
1	October 25, 1890	Polo Grounds III, aka Brotherhood Park	Columbia	40–0	???
2	October 8, 1902	Polo Grounds II, aka Columbia Field	Columbia	45–0	1,000
3	September 30, 1972	Baker Field	Columbia	44–0	6,845
4	October 5, 1991	Wien Stadium	Fordham	20–16	3,650
5	September 26, 1992	Jack Coffey Field	Columbia	18–9	3,521
6	September 25, 1993	Wien Stadium	Columbia	7–0	3,325
7	October 8, 1994	Jack Coffey Field	Columbia	24–13	5,266
8	September 28, 1996	Jack Coffey Field	Columbia	17–10	5,713
9	September 16, 2000	Wien Stadium	Columbia	43–26	5,007
10	November 22, 2001	Jack Coffey Field	Fordham	41–10	3,715
Series: Columbia leads 8–2

== Liberty Cup results ==
Fordham earned victories in the final six Liberty Cup contests, the longest win streak of all meetings with Columbia, giving the Rams a 10–4 Cup series lead:

Columbia victories	Fordham victories

No.	Date	Location	Winner	Score	Attendance and Source
1	September 21, 2002	Wien Stadium	Columbia	13–11	3,865
2	September 20, 2003	Jack Coffey Field	Fordham	37–30	6,895
3	September 18, 2004	Wien Stadium	Fordham	17–14	2,176
4	September 17, 2005	Jack Coffey Field	Columbia	23–17	6,912
5	September 16, 2006	Wien Stadium	Columbia	37–7	4,454
6	September 15, 2007	Jack Coffey Field	Fordham	27–10	3,721
7	September 20, 2008	Wien Stadium	Fordham	29–22	2,304
8	September 19, 2009	Jack Coffey Field	Columbia	40–28	6,449
9	September 18, 2010	Wien Stadium	Fordham	16–9	4,454
10	September 17, 2011	Jack Coffey Field	Fordham	21–14	6,820
11	September 22, 2012	Wien Stadium	Fordham	20–13	4,318
12	September 21, 2013	Jack Coffey Field	Fordham	52–7	7,026
13	September 20, 2014	Wien Stadium	Fordham	49–7	4,805
14	September 19, 2015	Jack Coffey Field	Fordham	44–24	8,052
Series: Fordham leads 10–4

Following the most recent game in 2015, the overall series is tied, with both teams at 12 wins. Combining the 24 contests, Columbia outscored Fordham 527–494.
