= Harvard University Band =

Student band in Cambridge, Massachusetts, US

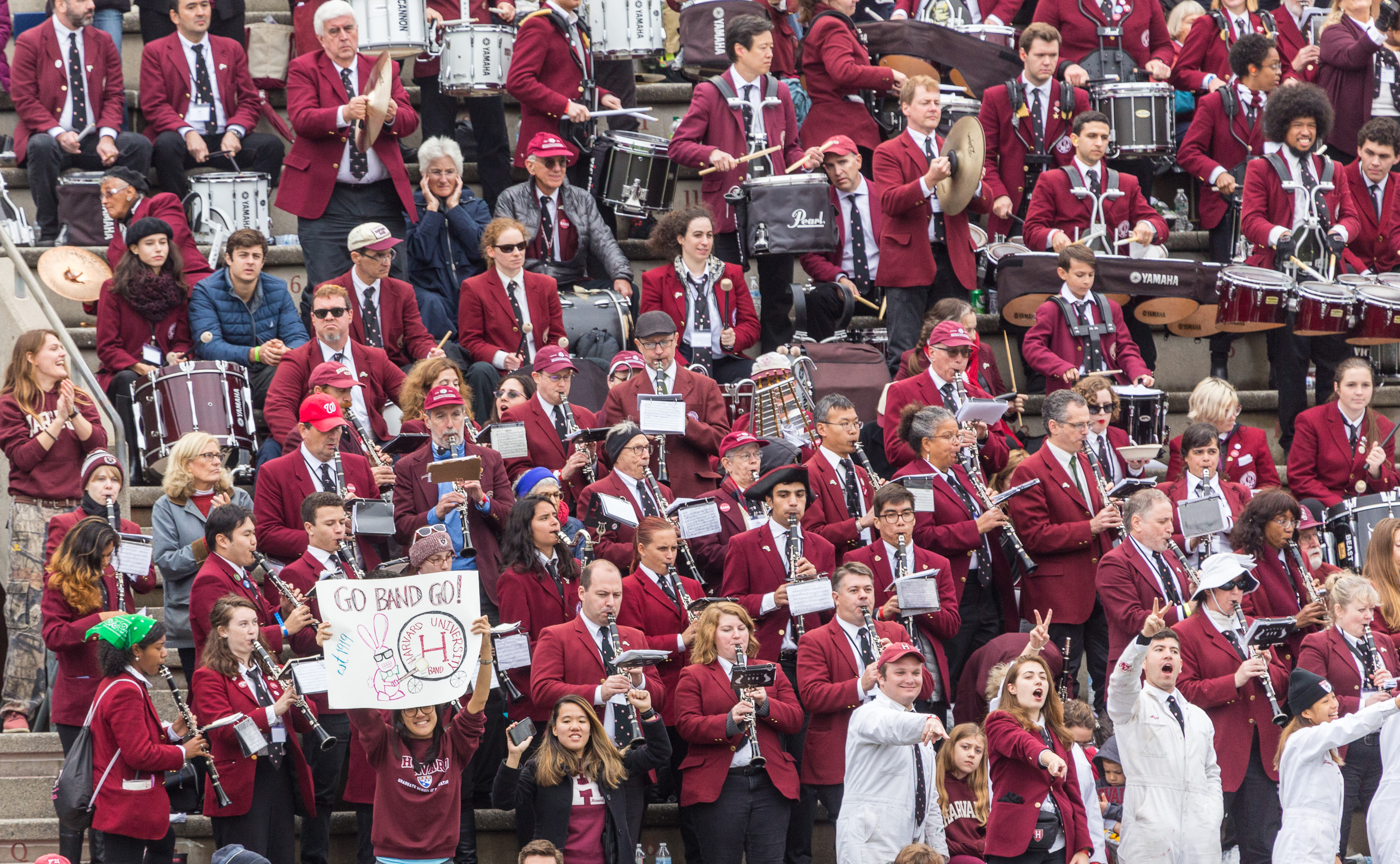
- Students and alumni celebrate the 100th anniversary of the Harvard University Band in 2019
- School: Harvard University
- Location: Cambridge, Massachusetts, U.S.
- Conference: Ivy League
- Founded: 1919
- Director: Mark E. Olson
- Members: 80+
- Fight song: ""10,000 Men of Harvard", "Yo Ho!", "Fight Fiercely, Harvard!", "Harvardiana", "Up The Street""
- Website: www.harvardband.org

The Harvard University Band (HUB) is the official student band of Harvard University. The Harvard Wind Ensemble, the Harvard Summer Pops Band, and the Harvard Jazz Bands also fall under the umbrella organization of HUB. Currently, the band plays for all football games (both home and away) as well as home men's and women's ice hockey games. Occasionally it plays at men's and women's basketball games. The uniform for both football games and other formal appearances consists of a crimson wool HUB blazer worn over a white shirt with a black HUB logo tie, black pants (since 1961), and black shoes. In the early days of the Band, white sailor hats and khaki pants were worn. For hockey games, the band wears (over casual clothes) a custom Harvard Band hockey jersey, modeled after the home jerseys for men's hockey, which features images of Bertha (the huge bass drum) on the sleeves. Band alumni, known as crusties, maintain strong ties to the HUB, sometimes continuing to act as regular members well after graduating from the university. Illegitimum non carborundum (INC) is the HUB motto. Written correspondence from HUB or HUB members is frequently signed with INC.

== History ==
The band was formed in 1919. By 1930 the band had become a scramble band, a method that was also adopted by most other Ivy League marching bands (as well as the Stanford Band and the Rice Marching Owl Band), with the exception of the Cornell University band. While the inventor of the scramble band technique remains in debate, the HUB maintains a strong claim to the title. A scramble band simply runs (in lieu of marching) from one formation to the next on a cue, typically a starter's pistol.

The HUB office was formerly at 9 Prescott St., and moved to 74 Mt. Auburn St, in Cambridge, Massachusetts in 1995. The Harvard University Band's new headquarters was named the "Anderson Band Center" on October 26, 1995, in honor of Leroy Anderson, Director in 1929 and from 1931 to 1935.

== Band leadership ==
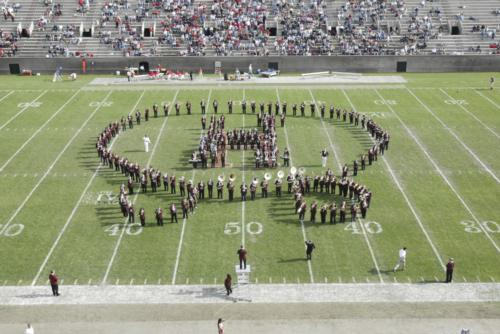
At The Game 1994

The Band is led by a Senior Staff consisting of five officers:

Manager: Oversees finances and activity bookings. Drill Master: Writes and directs the field shows for football games; coordinates the cheers during hockey games. Student Conductor: Conducts and writes arrangements. Drum Major: Serves as the leader for field and parade performances; assists in conducting with a mace; acts as the liaison with other Ivy Bands and coordinator of all away trips. Schneider: Coordinates the social activities of the Band and maintains and bolsters esprit de corps.

The senior staff uniforms vary from the standard uniform. The Drum Major wears a tuxedo, red bow tie, and carries a mace, the Drill Master wears a black trench coat, the Student Conductor wears a HUB bow tie, the Manager wears a unique black hat, and the Schneider wears a green tie.

Junior Staffers, who often later become Senior Staffers, work to build up band loyalty and spirit, and themselves provide the core active membership. Junior staff is composed largely of committees under each of the Senior Staff members:

Manager's Committee: Treasurer, Merchandise Coordinator, Webmaster, Alumni and Public Relations Coordinator, Mailing Coordinator, Historian
Drill Master's Committee: Assistant Drill Manager (ADM), Prop Crew Manager, Recruiting Coordinator, Cinematographer, Social Media Coordinator, Minecraft Maestro (retired position)
Student Conductor's Committee: Music Manager (2), Music Archivist, Arrangements and Licensing Coordinator, Percussion Arranging Coordinator, Instruments Manager
Drum Major's Committee: Internal, Trips Manager, Section Leaders - Saxophones, Clarinets, Trumpets, Flutes, Percussion, Low Brass
Schneider's Committee: Weisse (3-4), Schwartz
Miscellaneous: Wind Ensemble Manager, Jazz Band Manager

The Senior Staff is selected by the previous Senior Staff. The official transition takes place annually in the HUB section of the stands after the completion of the halftime show at The Game.

=== Directors ===
Dates	Director
• 1919-1921	Frederic L. Reynolds '20
• 1922-1923	Addison Simmons '24
• 1924-1926	Ambrose F. Keeley '27
• 1927-1928	Harold Holland '28
• 1929	Leroy Anderson '29
• 1930-1931	Guy V. Slade '32
• 1931-1935	Leroy Anderson '29
• 1936-1937	Robert W. Snyder '38
• 1938-1939	James C. Gahan '36
• 1940-1941	James W. Holt DMD '42
• 1942	Malcolm Holmes '28
• 1943-1944 (Naval unit band)	Ed Chastagner (drum major & drill master)
• 1945 (transitional)	-
• 1946-1952	Malcolm Holmes '28
• 1953-1959	G. Wright Briggs '31
• 1960-1969	James Walker AMT '63
• 1970	Frank Battisti
• 1971–2013	Thomas G. Everett (longest serving director in HUB history and of all the Ivy Bands)
• 2014–Present	Mark E. Olson

== Large items ==
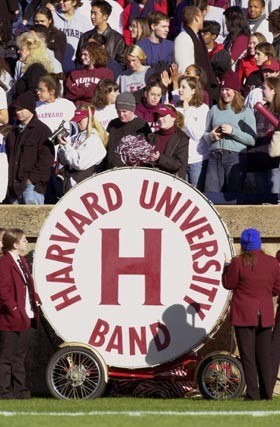
Bertha

- The Band's bass drum, depicted on the HUB logo, is towed on wheels and measures approximately 8 feet across. The HUB newsletter is also named the "Bass Drum Journal". The drum is called Bertha. Made from cow's hide, it was at one time the largest playable natural-skin bass drum in the world. Currently it has two mylar drumheads manufactured by the Remo Drum Company. In the past, Bertha was the target of thefts by the rival bands from Yale and Brown. In 1963, the giant drumstick used to sound rhythm on Bertha was spirited away during the second half of the Columbia game at Harvard's home stadium; members of the Columbia University Marching Band at the time, and their progeny, have no idea who may have taken the stick.
  - Bertha originally was purchased in 1927 by the Associated Harvard Clubs, when the band requested a bass drum to play at their convention. Given a blank check, the band purchased the largest drum available. The band has not been invited to play for any Associated Harvard Club conventions since. The current one was purchased in 1956 after a series of fundraising concerts when the other became too damaged to play.
- HUB owns one of the world's only working subcontrabass tubas, a 7-foot-tall (2.1 m) tuba built in BBB♭ by Besson in the 1890s. The musician playing this instrument must experiment and relearn which valve combinations are appropriate for each note. Musicians who have played the tuba in public performances include Boston Symphony Orchestra tubist Chester Schmitz, and Sam Pilafian. The tuba had a large accumulation of dent damage removed somewhere between 1994 and 2002, and was fully restored in 2019 for the band centenary. The bell is engraved "Besson & Sons, London England, Carl Fischer, U.S Agent, New York", and is one of only four fully playable subcontrabass tubas in the world.
- The band owns a large wooden chair (the Throne) which is ornately decorated with the Harvard logo and HUB motto. It was a gift of the university and the Class of 1903, which the band received in 1953. Currently it is the seat of the Drill Master during drill meetings at which the show for the next week is planned.

== Prop Crew ==
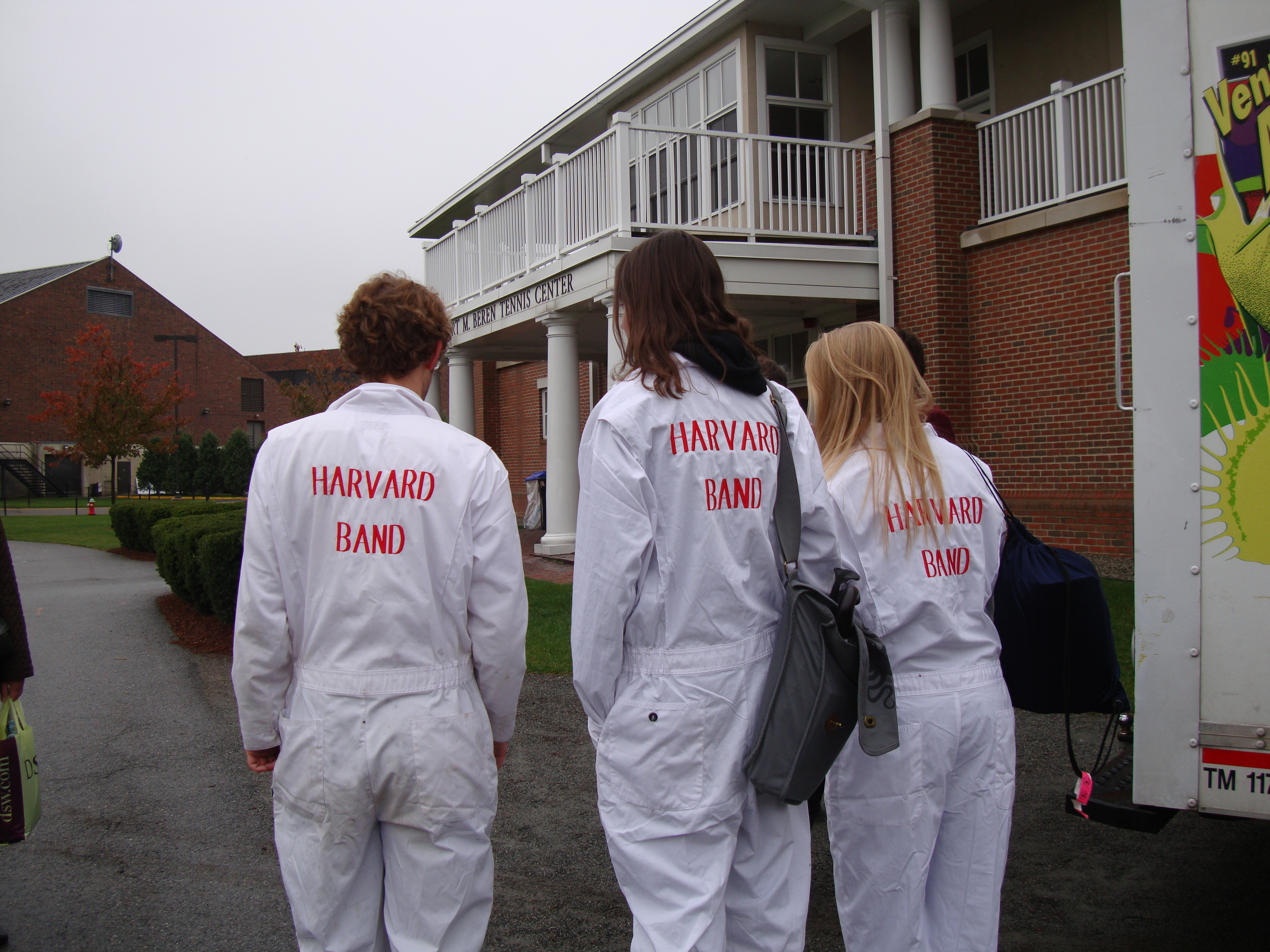
Prop Crew

The Band "Prop Crew" is part of the Harvard Band and is an integral part of the band's spirit and performance. Prop crew members do not play instruments but generally assist with putting on the halftime show (often acting as extras in the performances) and playing "Bertha." The attire for Prop Crew members is a white jumpsuit with "HARVARD BAND" emblazoned in red stitching on the back.

== Color guard ==
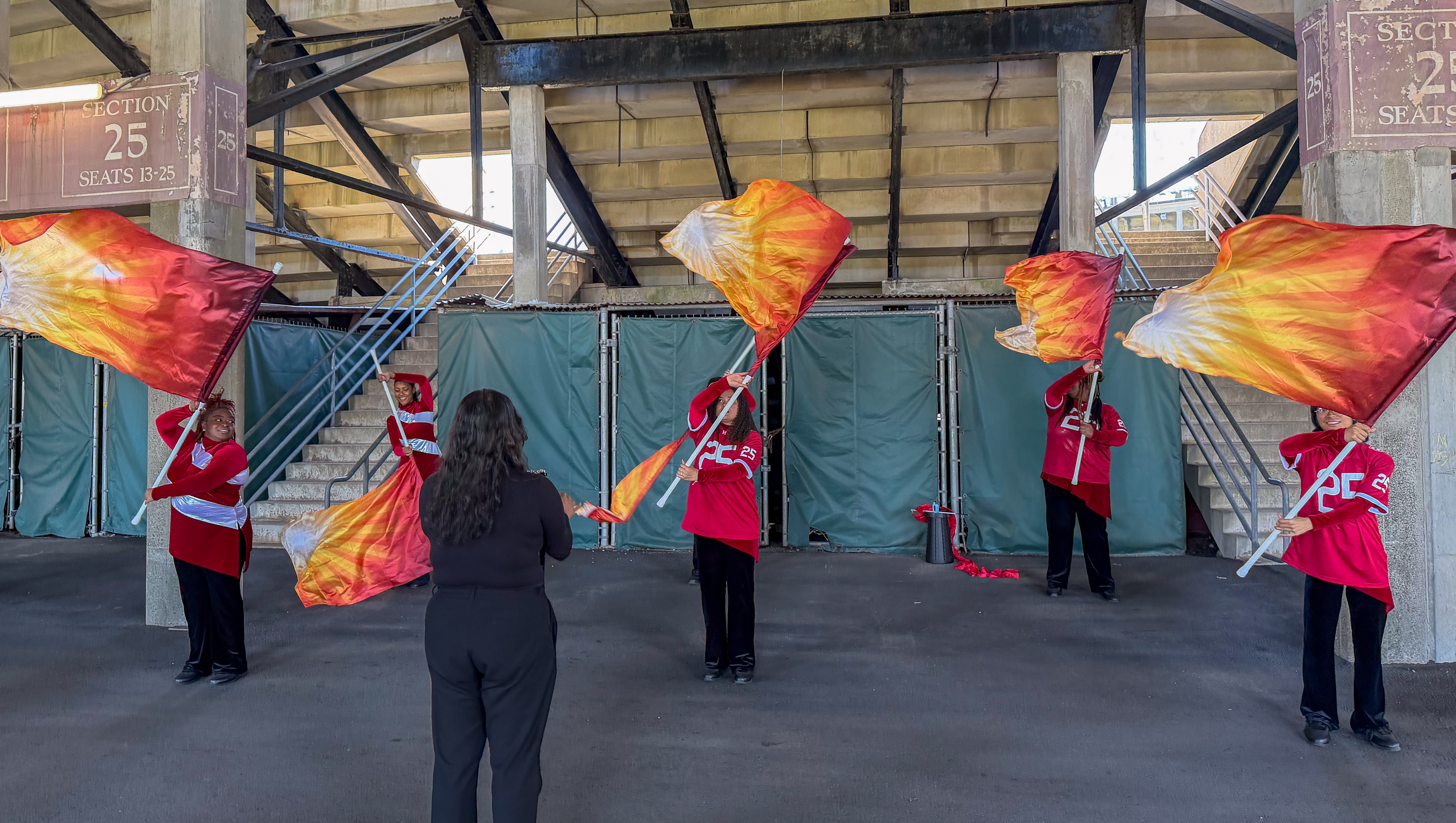
Color guard practices before a game

A color guard was introduced in Fall 2025. At least eight people joined.

== News and stunts ==
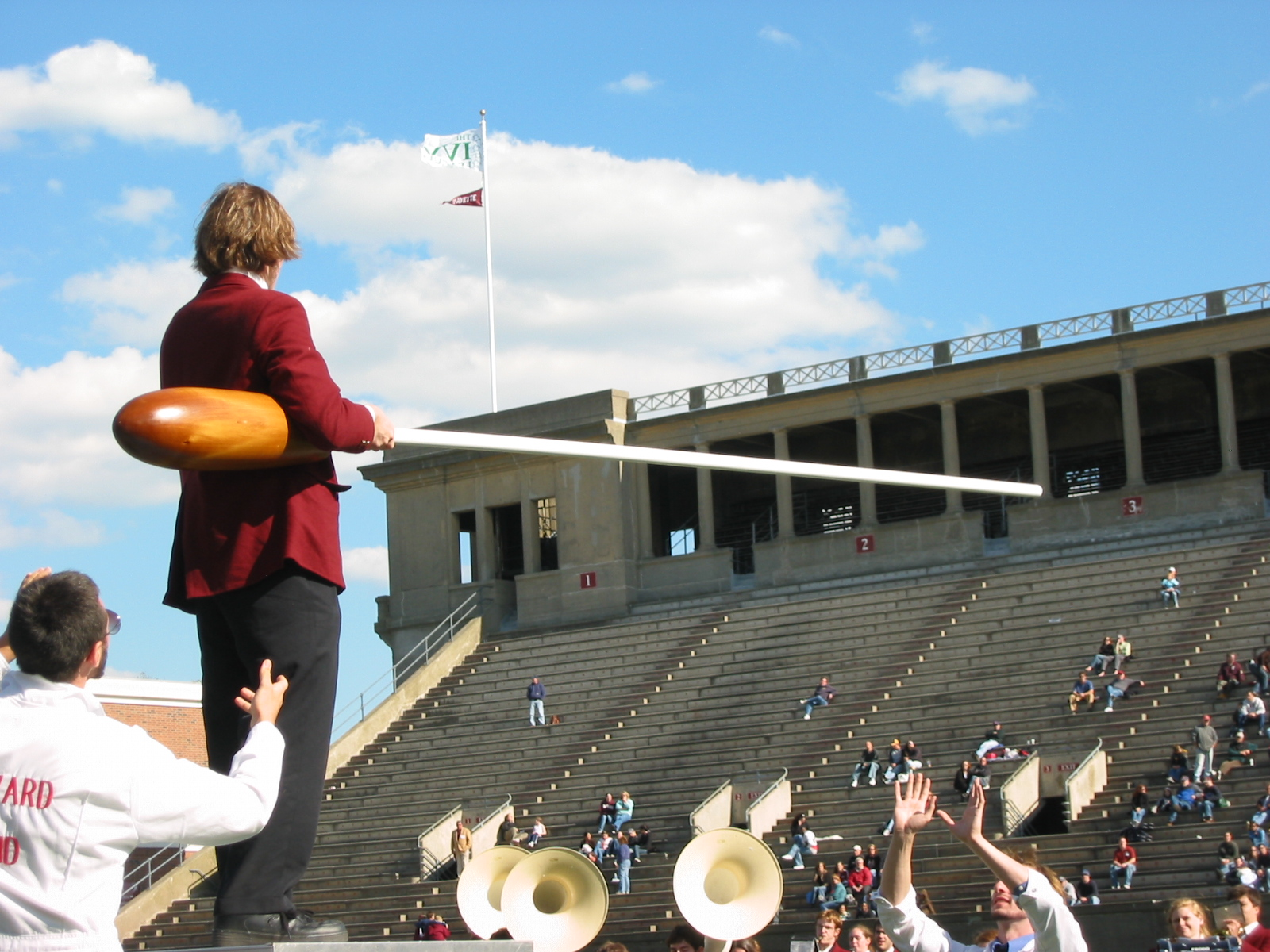
The HUB's then-largest baton

- 1954 – On March 6, the band took to the ice for the first time to skate and play for the Yale Hockey game.
- 1968 – The band is invited to play graveside at the interment service for Senator Robert F. Kennedy at Arlington National Cemetery.
- 1970 – To celebrate the integration of the (female) Radcliffe students into the traditionally all-male Harvard Houses (upper class dormitories), the band suggested that language study would be particularly improved by these "cunning linguists." Ever since all halftime shows have been reviewed by administration officials.
- 1971 – Director Thomas Everett founds the Harvard Jazz Band
- 1972 – Members of the Brown University Band, posing as an ABC News crew complete with blazers, jump suits, camera and truck, persuades a band freshman to help them transport the "Big Bass Drum" down to Soldiers Field for pre-game filming whereupon they absconded with the drum. A friendly Massachusetts judge (and Band alumn) issues a bench warrant and the malefactors are soon caught by State Troopers. Future band manager Sam Coppersmith remains the only person ever to be awarded "Turkey of the Year" by two separate Ivy League Bands.
- 1975 – At the Princeton game, student conductor Tom McGrath, in a tribute to the Boston Pops, led the audience in a mass sing-along of the "Ode to Joy" from the Finale of Beethoven's Ninth Symphony, in the original German.
- 1976 – At the Brown game, student conductor Jack Barbash lands in a helicopter on the field dressed as Leonard Bernstein, and the impersonation is said to have been believed by the audience.
- 1979 – Diane Wasserman is the first woman named manager of the band.
- 1994 – At the 75th Reunion, the 1812 Overture was performed on the field with the explosion of hydrogen balloons serving as cannon fire. The idea was inspired by Harvard residence Lowell House's traditional courtyard rendition of the same song using the same method.
- 2006 – At the Lafayette game, student conductor Kenton Hetrick '07 conducted the HUB with a 12' 6" baton, which broke the Guinness World Record for largest baton. This has since been broken by the Harmonie Amicitia Roggel of the Netherlands, with a baton measuring 13' 11". On October 20, 2007 The University of Pennsylvania Band unveiled a 15' 9" baton nicknamed "The Maestro," setting the new world record.
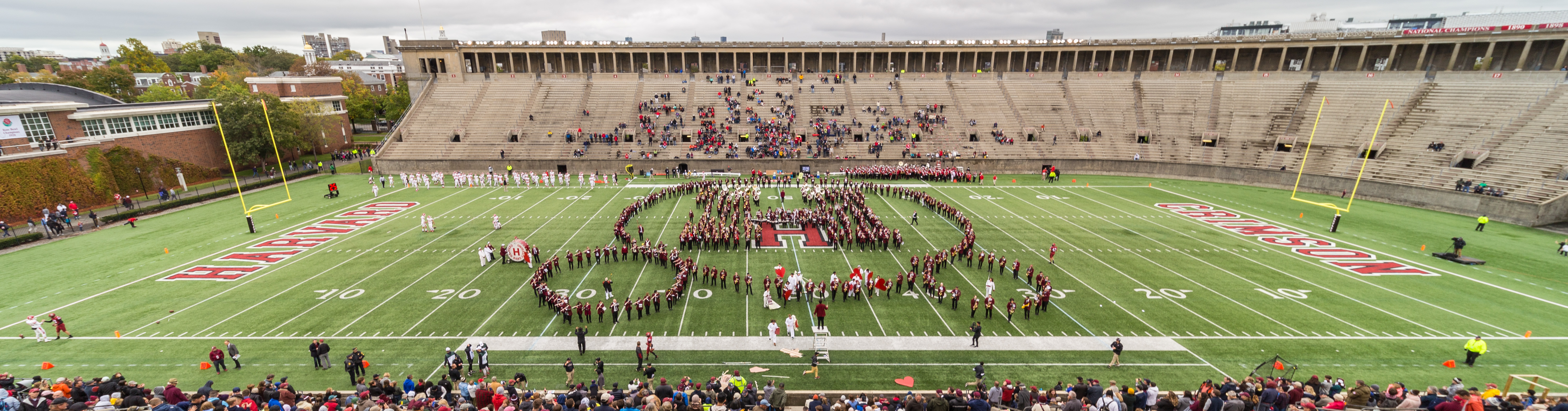
To mark the 100th anniversary of the band, hundreds of alumni joined the band at Harvard Stadium on October 12, 2019.

== Notable alumni ==
- Leroy Anderson (pronounced luh-ROY) '29 (Trombone) was director of the HUB first in 1929 and then from 1931 to 1935. He also played as an undergraduate beginning in 1926, and was student conductor from 1928 to 1930. Composer of The Syncopated Clock (used for 25 years as the theme music for "The Late Show," the WCBS late-night movie.), Fiddle-Faddle, The Typewriter, Blue Tango, A Trumpeter's Lullaby and the Christmas classic Sleigh Ride among many others. The Harvard University Band's new headquarters was named the "Anderson Band Center" in 1995 in honor of Leroy Anderson.
- Theodore Kaczynski '62 (Trombone) is also known as the Unabomber. He briefly joined the HUB as a freshman in 1958.
- G. Wright Briggs '31 was band director from 1953 to 1959 was a member of the theory and composition faculty of the New England Conservatory of Music and program director for the famous Boston public radio station WBZ.
- Thomas Eugene Everhart '53 (Trombone) was the president of Caltech from 1987 to 1997.
- David M. Dobson '91 (Tuba) is the creator of the computer game Snood. As a Tubist, Dobson was known to play Flight of the Bumblebee and also arranged a 3-tuba Pachelbel's Canon.
- Tom McGrath '76 (Trumpet) was a founding member of the Harvard Jazz Band and Student Conductor from 1975 to 1976. He is a Hollywood and Broadway producer. Produced the film The Princess Bride and the Broadway revivals of West Side Story and Hair
- Sam Coppersmith, 1975-76 Band Manager and victim of the Brown University stolen bass drum stunt, later became a Congressman from Arizona.

== Repertoire ==
=== Songs ===
The repertoire consists of traditional Harvard fight songs and their own arrangements of popular songs played for field shows.

Fight songs

- 10,000 Men of Harvard by Murray Taylor class of 1918
- Fair Harvard Harvard's Commencement Hymn by Samuel Gilman, Class of 1811 [Revised 1998]
- Fight Fiercely, Harvard! by Tom Lehrer class of 1946
- Gridiron King by Raymond Fletcher class of 1908
- Harvard Eternal (Premiered at the 90th Reunion in 2009, written by Hannah Horowitz class of 2011)
- Harvardiana by R.G. Williams 1911
- Onward Crimson (Premiered at the 85th Reunion in 2004, written by Joshua Rissmiller class of 2006)
- Our Director by F.E. Bigelow
- R-A-D by Alice Hunnewell class of 1914
- Score by J.W. Adams class of 1910
- Soldiers Field by Raymond Fletcher class of 1908
- Up the Street by R.G. Morse class of 1896
- Veritas by John Densmore class of 1904
- Yo-Ho by Raymon Fletcher class of 1908
- Wintergreen for President arr. Leroy Anderson and containing a medley of other fight songs
- Harvard Medley arr. by Leroy Anderson as a medley of several fight songs

Fight Fiercely

- Tom Lehrer, Harvard class of 1946, undoubtedly intended his song parody, "Fight Fiercely, Harvard" to mock the normally bellicose language of football fight songs. In keeping with the irreverent spirit of the band, they have adopted the song, and it is now sung with gusto at all the football games.

Unofficial

- Budweiser
- Sieve-Goalie (the tune of Hava Nagila played by the clarinets at hockey games to mock the opposing goalie)
- Theme from Hawaii Five-O (played during hockey games when Harvard is winning 5–0)
- Three Blind Mice (formerly played by the tubas when the referees emerge at hockey games, but due to accusations of unsportsmanlike conduct is relegated to a quiet rendition after particularly upsetting judgements against Harvard)
- The Bagpipe Cheer (the saxophones play "Scotland the Brave" while others dance a traditional Scottish dance)
- Underdog Theme played by the trombone section.

=== Cheers ===
- Black Hole Cheer – Used in hockey matches against opposing goalie.
- "1 2 3 4 Our team can really score, 1 1 1 1, humiliating isn't it?" OR "2 4 6 8 Our team is really great, 1 1 1 1, humiliating isn't it?" – Cheer for Hockey when the score is 4-1 or 8-1, respectively. Also performed in 4-0 and 8-0 versions.
- "That's all right, That's OK, You'll all work for us some day" – Cheer for when team is losing. Was banned for HUB use by Harvard Administration.
- "Hey Ref, you suck, we know where you live. Hey ref, we know, where you live... sucks."
- Repel them, Repel them, make them relinquish the ball to support the football defensive plays. (Written by Tom Lehrer)
- Navy Cheer: "Gooooooooo Har-vard! Beeeeeeeeat ___-___" for all sporting events
- Safety Cheer: "Hey [opposing school], 3 points is a field goal, two points is a safety, safety school, safety school" alternately: "6 points is a touchdown, etc." (used when Harvard is winning in hockey with a score of 3 to 2 or 6 to 2). It was banned for use by Harvard administration against any non-Ivy League opponent.
- Sieve Cheer: (while pointing) "Sieve! Sieve! Sieve! (etc.) It's all your fault!" (used at Hockey games against the opposing goalie at the beginning of each period and when Harvard scores; also used when in the case that any obvious mistake is made, for example a flubbed musical entry or note)
- Engineers Cheer: E to the x, d-y,d-x; E to the y, d-y; Cosine, Secant, Tangent, Sine; 3 point 1,4,1,5,9—Come on Harvard, Give 'em the digit!! (With appropriate accompanying hand gesture.)

Staff cheers
These cheers are intended for the band itself, rather than the audience

- The Flower Cheer – variants: Flour Cheer, Spaghetti Cheer (or any cheer for objects thrown into the HUB section of the stands).
- The Greek Cheer – a rousing cheer in honor of the new freshmen members of the band.
- MOM cheer – a cheer for Alice Tondel, aka "MOM". The word "MOM" is spelled backward, forward, and upside-down (WOW).
- the Humpty Dumpty Cheer, yelled by those in the back of the stands when they can't be heard
- The Bottle Cheer – cheer performed during third quarter during years when drinking age was 18. Band members would rhythmically beat the bottles they had emptied and would punctuate each phrase with the word, FIGHT.

== The Latin verse ==
There is an old saying that, "You can always tell a Harvard Man (now Grad)....but you can't tell 'em very much." In keeping with that tradition, the main Harvard fight song, Ten Thousand Men of Harvard features a first verse in Latin. The verse is intended as an extended Latin pun and makes little sense when translated: The verse was written in 1953 by Ed Upton '53, Alan Robinson '54 and Charles Lipson '54.

Illigitimum non Carborundum, Domine Salvum Fac.
Illigitimum non Carborundum, Domine Salvum Fac.
Gaudeamus Igitur,
Veritas, non Sequitur,
Illigitimum non Carborundum, Ipso Facto

== Reunions ==
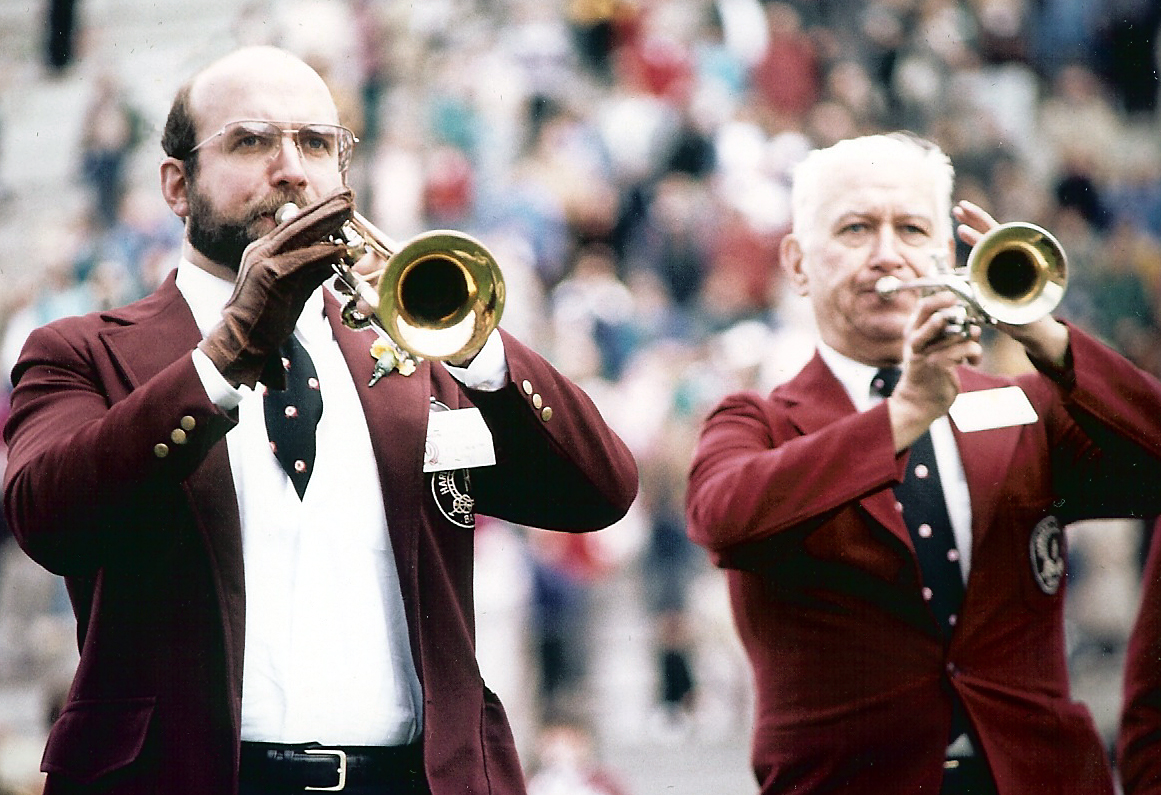
Tom McGrath '76 and his father Joe McGrath '44 at the Harvard Band's 75th reunion

Uniquely among college bands, the Harvard Band holds its own reunion every five years. It is also the oldest college band reunion in the world, with the first held at the Harvard University Band's 30th Anniversary in 1949 The Band's 90th Reunion in 2009 had almost 200 alumni return to perform in Soldier's Field. These reunions allow a member to reconnect with friends from several graduating classes. By contrast, a typical class reunion is only for people who all graduated in the same year.

The band's 100th anniversary in 2019 attracted hundreds of band alumni to the October 12 game against Cornell University. Other centenary festivities included an evening of performances and a performance by the newly restored Besson tuba.
