= Pep band =

Type of musical ensemble

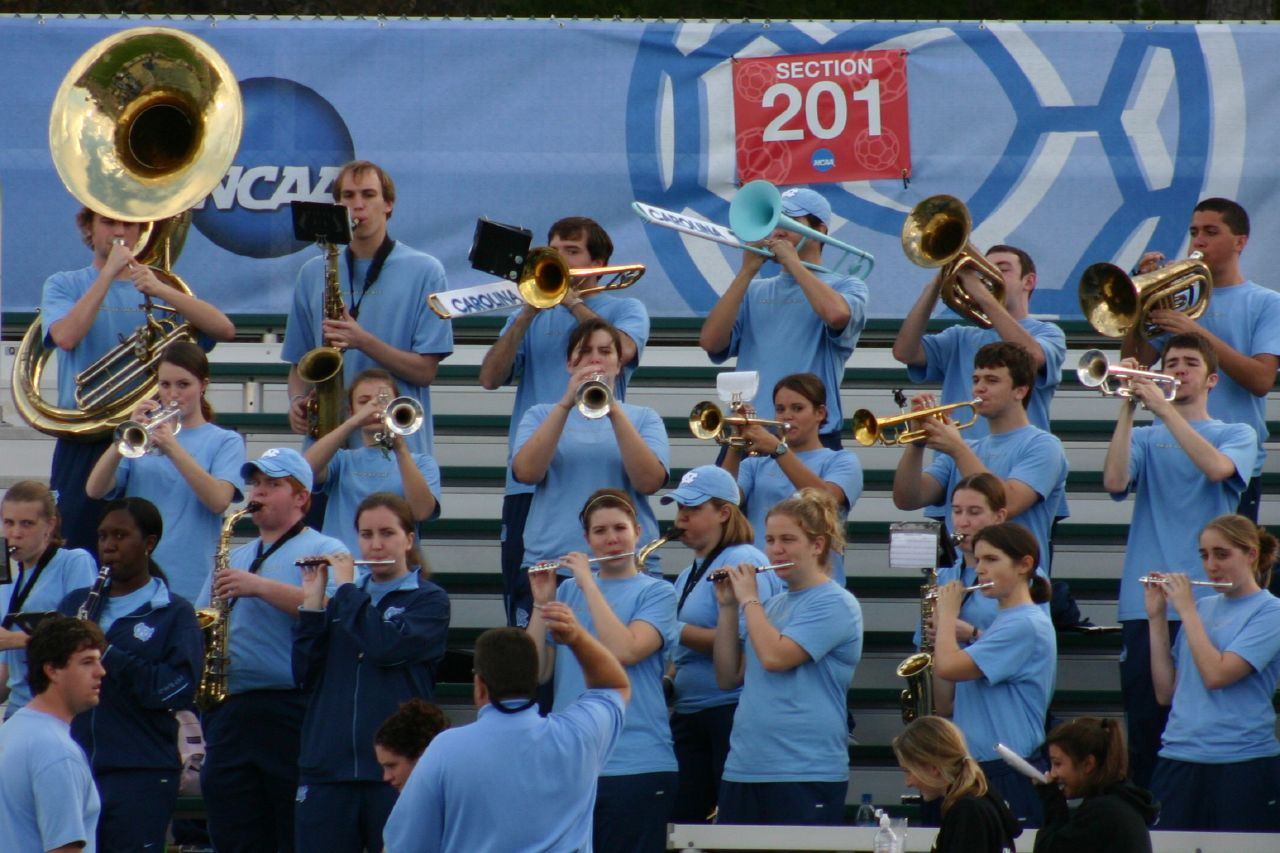
UNC Tar Heels pep band

A pep band is an ensemble of instrumentalists who play at events, usually at basketball or football games, with the purpose of entertaining and creating enthusiasm in a crowd. Often members of a pep band are a subset of people from a larger ensemble such as a marching band or a concert band. Pep bands are generally associated with performing at pep rallies and sporting events (usually football, basketball or hockey). With a few exceptions, pep bands are exclusive to the collegiate and high school levels. The typical instrumentation of a pep band is the same as most marching bands, using mainly woodwind, brass, and percussion instruments. Pep bands typically don't use primarily orchestral instruments (double reeds, strings, etc.), but this is not a hard set limitation.

== Origin ==
Pep bands have been in existence for a very long time, however their origins are vague and hard to find. The concept of pep band most likely sprung from marching band (a band during sporting events with choreography while they play music, normally with uniforms). Most high school and collegiate marching bands also serve as a pep band when not performing on the field. While playing at competitive events, should both teams have a pep band, the bands will compete and go back and forth playing songs. Pep bands usually have a repertoire that consists primarily of rock and pop music, with styles such as jazz, R&B, rap, funk, and movie themes also fairly common. Pep bands will also sometimes perform their school's songs (most commonly their alma mater and fight songs), and the country's national anthem (e.g The Star-Spangled Banner, O Canada) prior to the start of a game or event.

== See also ==
- Scramble band
