= Brown University Band =

Marching band

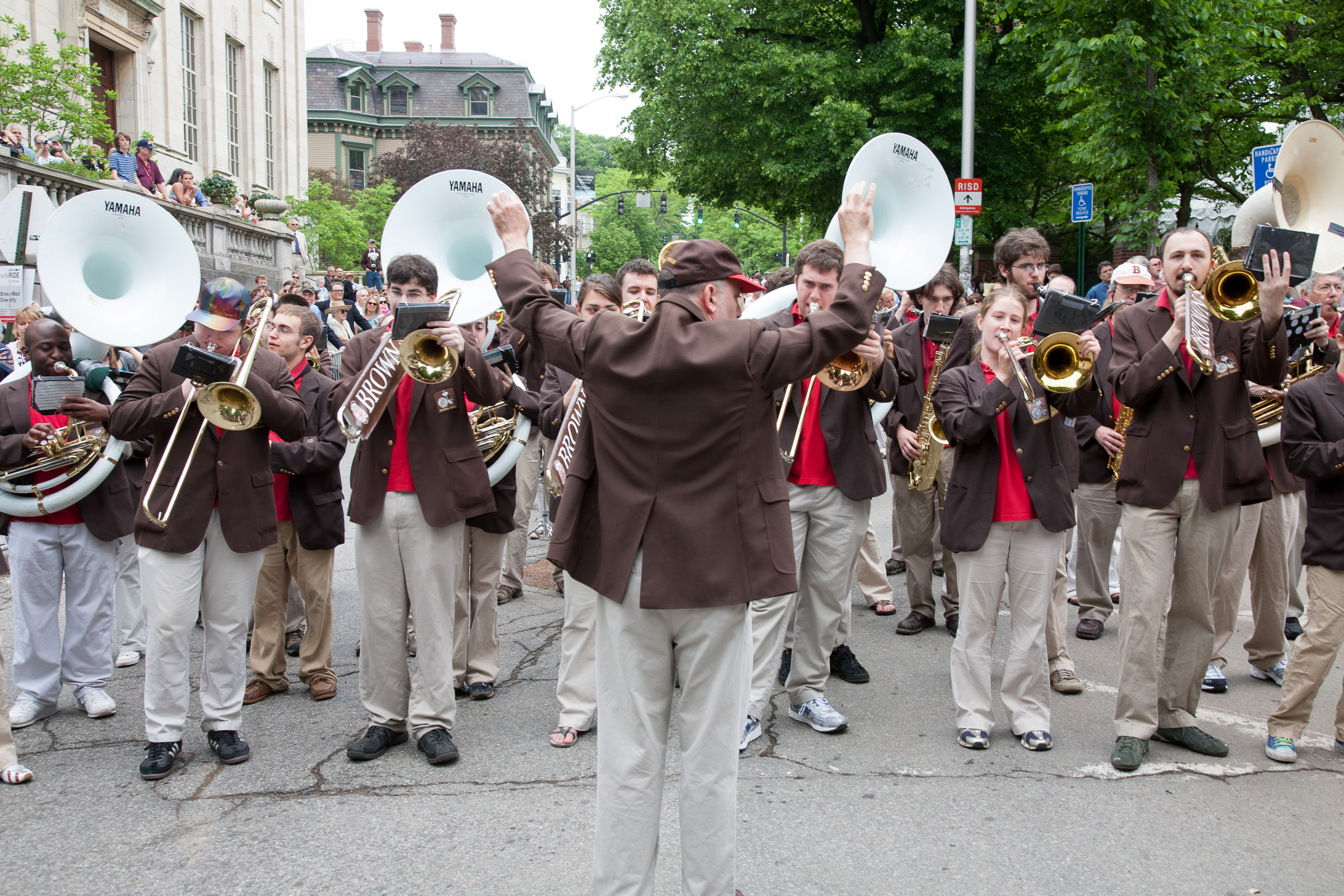
- The Brown University Band at 2009 Commencement
- School: Brown University
- Location: Providence, RI
- Conference: Ivy League
- Founded: 1924
- Members: ~50 (2016)
- Website: students.brown.edu/band/

The Brown University Band is the official band of Brown University. Like all Ivy League bands, save for Cornell, it is a scatter band. The Brown Band began performing on ice skates in 1970, and claims to be the world's best (and, actually, only) ice skating scatter band. It is the source of much of Brown's school spirit, and often appears as a public representation of Brown to the Providence community and to other universities. The Band is present at all home and away football games, various basketball and hockey games, as well as Commencement and other special events each year. It receives funding from Brown's Undergraduate Finance Board.

== History and traditions ==
The Band was founded in 1924 by Irving Harris, a freshman who was shocked to find that the University had no band. This established a tradition of a student-run organization that currently has University practice space and a faculty advisor, but is primarily driven by its student leadership.

The Band creates between 700 and 1000 buttons for each football game. These buttons have short messages that make fun of the opposing team, usually through wordplay and stereotyping the opposing school. Brown Band members proudly display these buttons on their uniforms, often making large patterns out of them. Buttons are handed out to every fan who goes near the Band. During the third quarter, several bandies will walk over to the opposing team's stands and hand out buttons. Other bands are typically the first recipients of buttons during this time, and many band members at other Ivy League schools wear Brown Band buttons on their uniforms.

=== Elrod T. Snidley ===
Elrod T. Snidley is the Brown Band's mascot. He is always depicted carrying a bugle and leaning on a bass drum. Elrod was created in 1968 as a self-portrait of Band President C. Douglas Ballon, '69. In those days, Ballon's cross-eyed likeness of himself was affectionately referred to as "Doogi". Renamed "Elrod" by Ballon's successors, his likeness adorns almost every object that the Brown Band wears or sells, including their uniforms, pens, and kazoos. Bandies often use a variation on the name "Elrod Snidley" for the titles of intramural sports teams its members play on.

Elrod also made a nearly successful run for President of the Undergraduate Council of Students in 1988. Bandies taped up posters of Elrod with the slogan, "Vote for Snidley - he won't do diddley!" While he was not officially recognized, he received nearly half of the student votes as a write-in candidate.

== Leadership ==
The Brown Band is a student-run organization with a faculty advisor. There is an elected board and various appointed positions of leadership. The leaders of the Band are collectively known as the Band Board, and are elected near the end of the fall football season. Band Board consists of a president, vice president, general manager ("mom"), business manager ("money god/goddess/deity"), corresponding secretary ("corsec"), and recording secretary ("recsec"). In addition to Band Board, there are several appointed positions of leadership, including a head student conductor and one to two assistant conductors, script writers, historians, librarians, webmasters, public relations and recruitment chairs, and alumni liaisons.

== Repertoire ==
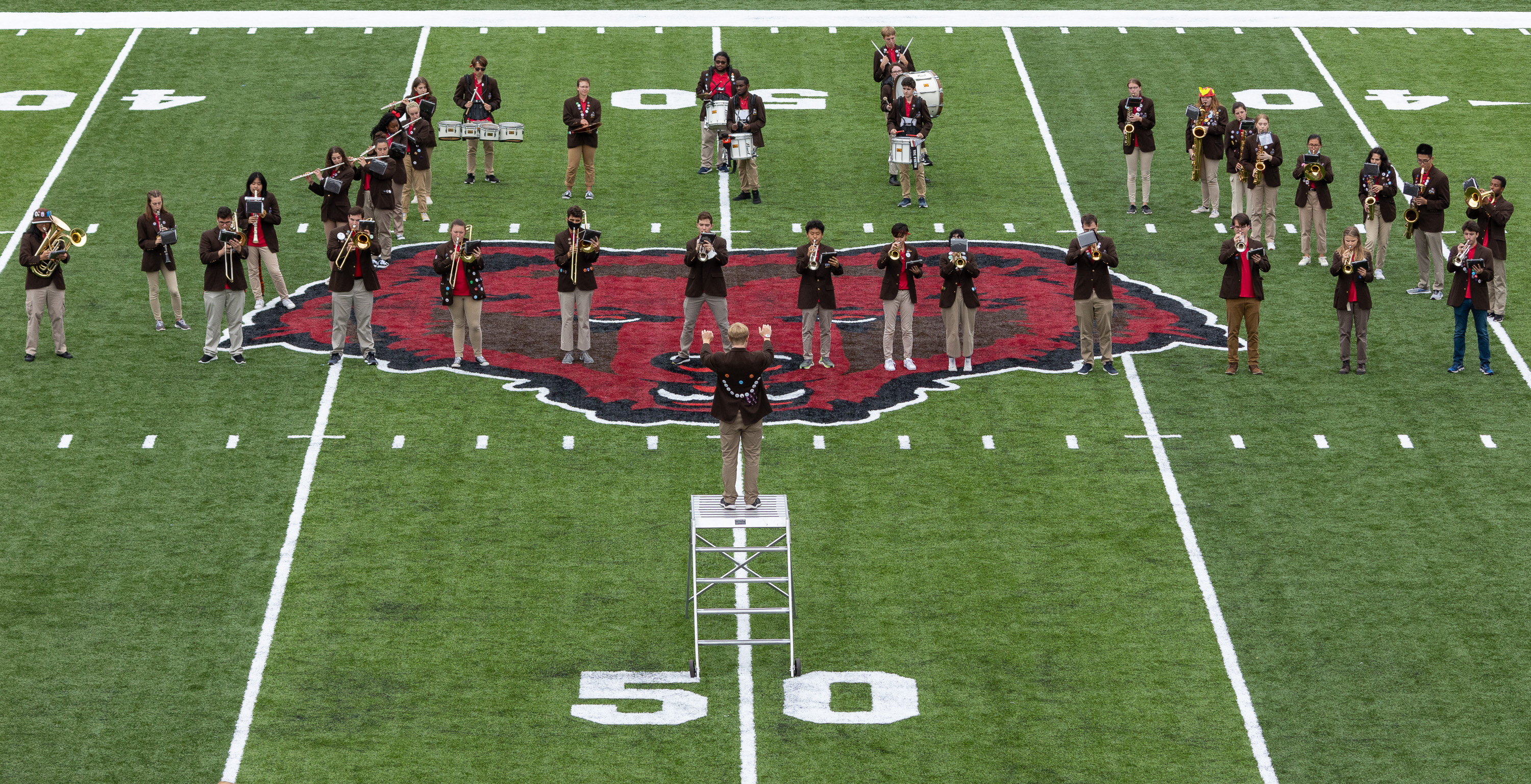
The Brown Band perform during halftime on Richard Gouse Field at Brown Stadium in 2021

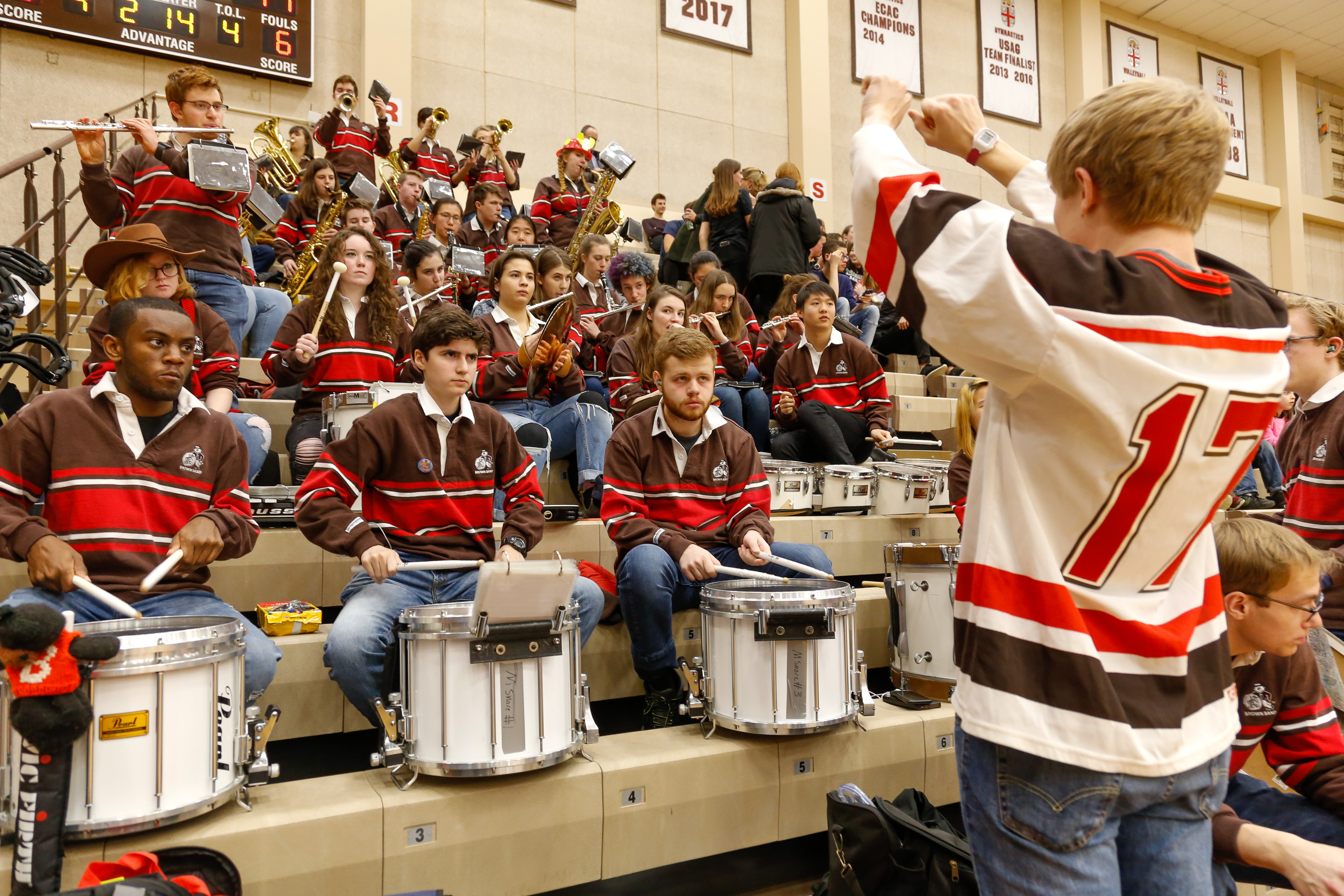
Pep Band at a basketball game, Feb 2020

The Brown Band's repertoire is a selection of music from the Band's music library, which contains several hundred pieces of music. The repertoire itself consists of approximately fifty songs and undergoes slight changes each year. The repertoire comprises several Brown-specific songs and many more pop songs. While most Brown students know the words to Ever True to Brown (Brown's fight song), few people outside the Band know the words to other Brown songs. Many songs have alternate lyrics that the band sings to pass time on long bus trips. Brown songs are typically played, sung, and played again. Some Brown songs are played only at certain events. Ki-Yi-Yi is played when the hockey team scores a goal. On the Chapel Steps and the Commencement March are part of the repertoire only during Commencement Week.

The Brown-specific Songs Are as Follows:

- Ever True to Brown (#1)
- Brown Cheering Song (#2)
- Brown Forevermore (#3 or "Brown Three-evermore")
- For Bruno and For Brown (#4 or "4 Bruno and 4 Brown")
- Alma Mater ("Apple Mango," "That Song," etc.)
- Brown Bear (A polka)
- Bring the Victory
- In the Fray
- Brown Man Born (Brunonian Born)

The band plays a wide variety of pop songs, which are often arranged by the band's own members. Some of the more frequently played songs include:

- You Can Call Me Al
- The Impression That I Get
- Stacy's Mom
- Pompeii
- Time Warp
- Ding Dong Song
- Bad Romance
- We're All in This Together
- Karn Evil 9 (1st Impression, Part 2)
- I Want You Back
- Build Me Up, Buttercup
- Doctor Worm
- Rock Lobster

== Events ==
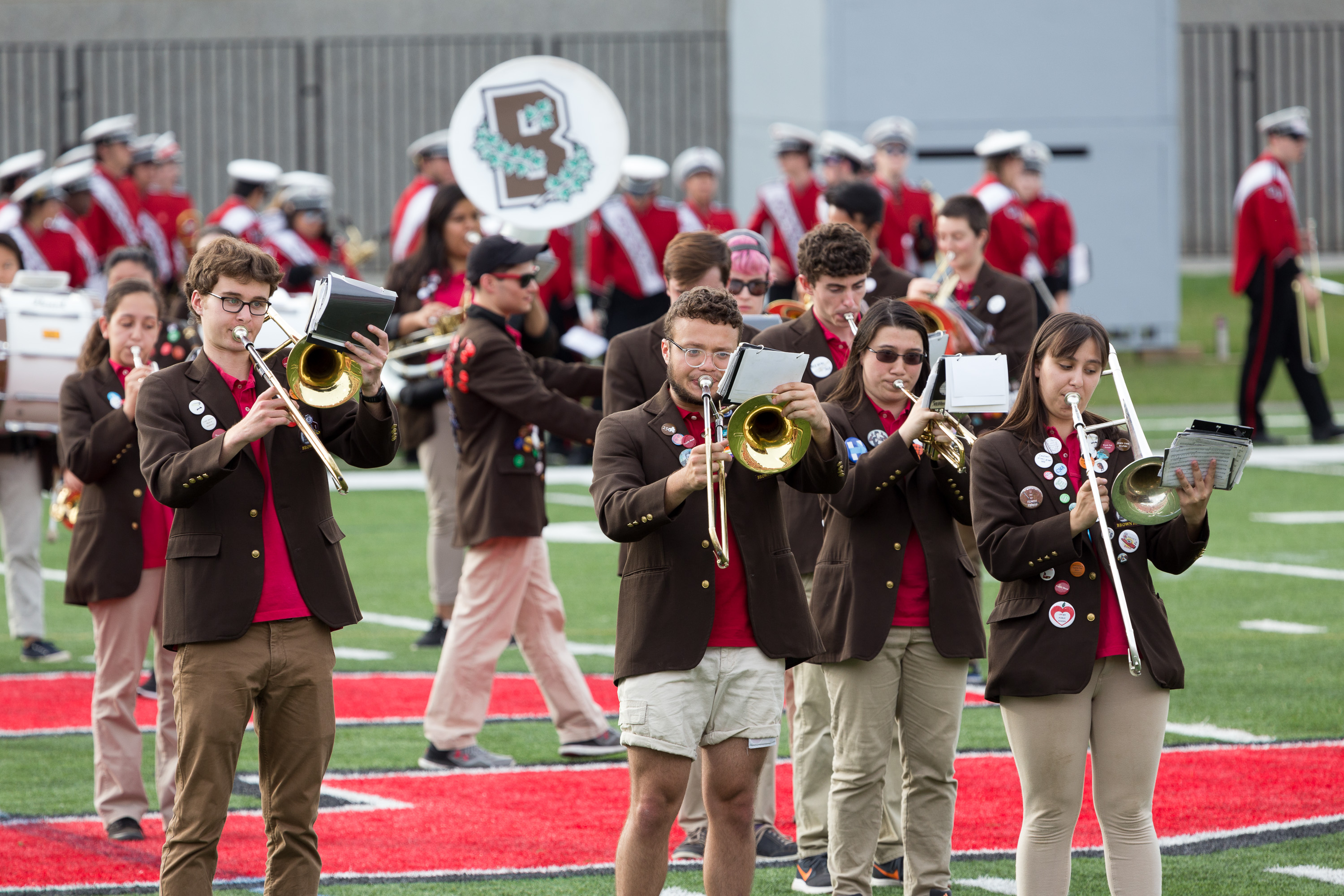
The Brown University Band (in brown blazers) play at Cornell's Schoellkopf Field in October 2017. Cornell's band is behind them.

The Band is present at every home and away Ivy football game in the fall semester. During the spring semester, the band will play at basketball or hockey games once or twice a weekend, and usually one lacrosse game per semester. Brown University administration also occasionally asks the band to be present at certain important events, such as the kickoff of the Boldly Brown campaign or the dedication of Friedman Hall. Other yearly events include the stealth show, where the band hides in bushes and buildings surrounding the main green, then surprises students who are just leaving class at the busiest time of day with a humorous and uncensored scatter band show. On the morning of the Parents' Weekend football game, the Band completes a Campus March that takes them through several dorms and outside most of the rest. While the Band stands by the claim that this is to build team spirit and to get people to come to the football game, many students are unhappy with the early wakeup. However, not all parades are early in the morning. Every December, the Band parades around campus playing Christmas and Hanukkah carols, giving out hot chocolate and candy canes to anyone willing to brave the cold New England weather, and even playing inside the dining hall, library, and CIT. Once a year, the Band performs for patrons waiting in line for Ben and Jerry's Free Cone Day before getting their own free ice cream.

=== Ice shows ===
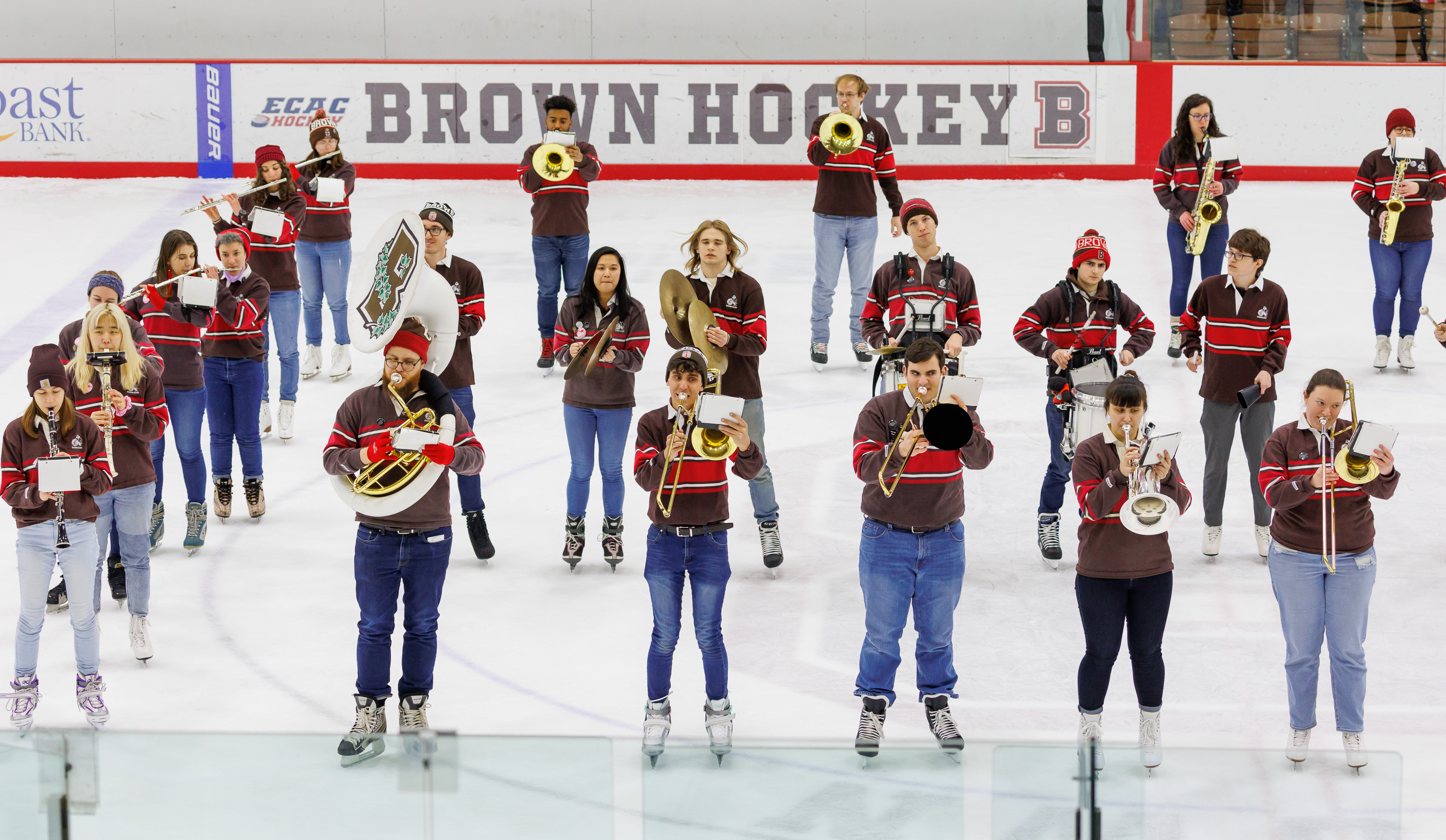
The Band on the ice at Meehan in 2023

Since the 1969-70 Hockey Season, after two hockey games a year at Brown's Meehan Auditorium, the Brown University Band performs an ice show, similar to field shows during football season. The Band "scrambles" and skates into forms on the ice while a humorous script is read over the PA system. Each ice show ends in a maneuver known as the Counterskate. The Band lines up in two rows perpendicular to the red and blue lines on the ice and begins playing "In the Fray." After eight measures (when the music begins to speed up), the lines begin skating towards the center of the ice, intersecting and crossing each other near the blue line. The lines continue and by the end of the piece, a capital letter B is formed between the two blue lines. This maneuver is likely the most ambitious and difficult stunt attempted on a regular basis by the Brown Band. This is especially so given the fact that many members have little to no skating experience, not to mention skating with an instrument.
