= Scramble band =

Type of marching band

A scramble band – also known as a scatter band – is a particular type of field-performing marching band with distinct characteristics that set it apart from other common forms of marching bands; most notably, scramble bands do not normally march. In fact, the name comes from the way in which the band moves between formations – members run to each form without using a predescribed path; this is known as scrambling.

== Characteristics ==
Scramble bands often take pride in their diversion from the normal marching band. In fact, most scramble bands do not march at all, regardless of whether their official group name contains a form of the word "March".

Like their marching counterparts, scramble bands almost always perform music using traditional band instruments. They will also stand in formations on a field, but that is usually where the similarity between scramble bands and typical marching bands end. The formations themselves are often simple shapes or crude "pictures" that lend themselves to a particular section of the performance instead of intricate geometric or abstract shapes. Additionally, scramble band performances often rely on a humorous or satirical script, read during the performance by an announcer using a loudspeaker or public address system.

Scramble bands are generally student-run and tend to be smaller in membership than what one would expect from a marching band.

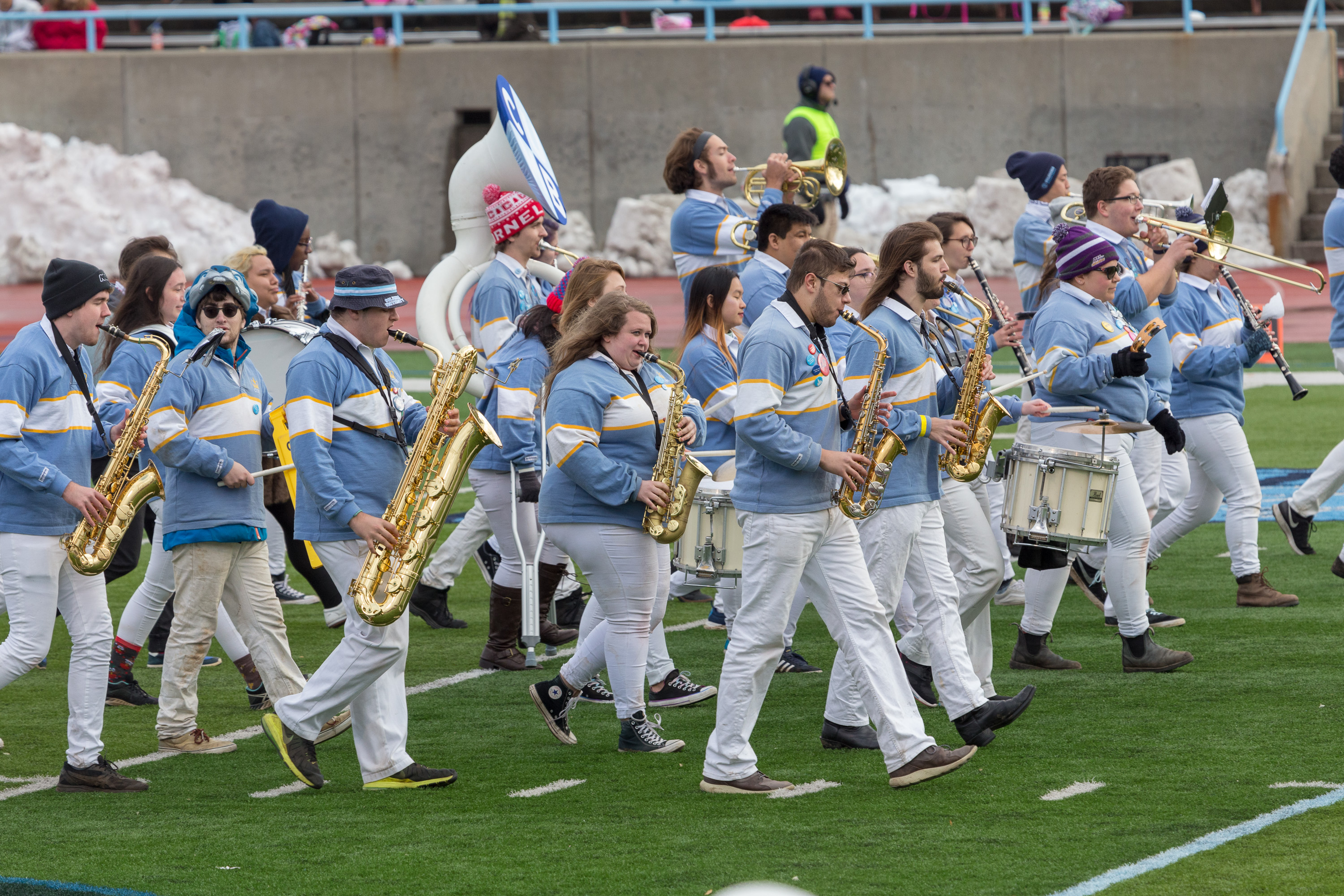
The Columbia University Marching Band (CUMB) during the Cornell vs Columbia game at Wien Stadium, November 17, 2018.

According to the self-described "Cleverest Band in the World" at Columbia University, the origin of scramble bands is as follows:

"See, in the 50s, our great country was going through a lot of changes. Disco was at its peak, little Shirley Temple was charming the hearts of Americans everywhere, Jesus was walking the earth, and Ronald Reagan was pushing hard for the new Women's suffrage movement. The Columbia University Marching Band, which had always been slightly wacky, took a good look at itself. "How," we asked ourselves, "could we make being in a marching band even more fun?" Well, we decided that the whole marching around and forming rhombi thing had gone out of style with World War II. So we introduced the world to the "scramble band" concept - so named for the way bandies would scramble from one interesting formation to the next."

However, there is no widespread agreement as to which school actually invented the scramble band concept. The Harvard University Band lays a significant claim to the title with proof of scrambling as early as The Game (Harvard-Yale), November 23, 1946, as well as spelling "Keep 'em Flying" for the Navy and forming an airplane with the drum major twirling his baton as the propeller in 1941. With Guy Slade as director, baton twirler, and drill master, 74 letters were spelled during the 1930 football season, 29 at the Harvard-Yale game alone. The word "Welcome" was learned and formed in five minutes at a stadium game with Michigan.

Other characteristics of scramble bands vary by the particular group and may include:

- Non-standard instrumentation - Some bands include string or electronic sections to offer membership to musicians who would otherwise be excluded from participation in a marching band. Instruments in this category might include violins, cellos, string bass, electronic keyboards, and electric guitar. More unusual instrumentation such as bagpipes and accordions is not unheard of. For example, the Princeton University Band included an accordion, a bagpipe, two violins (acoustic), an electric guitar, and an electric bass in the 2005-06 school year, and has also featured a set of plastic flamingos and a pair of plastic pumpkins. The Michigan Technological University Huskies Pep Band contains instruments not normally seen in a pep band setting such as violins, violas, oboes, and bassoons, and unusual instruments such as piccolo trumpets, a valve trombone, a soprano trombone, bagpipes, contra-alto clarinet and an oven. The Brown University Band is known to make extensive use of melodicas and kazoos in their shows. The Columbia University Marching Band includes a six foot bench stolen from the University of Pennsylvania stands.
- Non-musicians - Just as membership often includes non-standard instrumentalists, it may also include people who have little or no musical talent at all. These members may "play" homemade instruments (washboards, trash can lids, mailboxes, toasters, an oven, etc.) or may participate in other various capacities. They are usually known as "miscies," while at Princeton they are known as "garbussion," a portmanteau of "garbage" and "percussion." More skilled bands can have people with high levels of musical talent playing unusual instruments. The Stanford Band, for example, has "mugs" with sometimes up to a decade of musical education playing instruments such as a kitchen sink or satellite dish.
- Skits or other dramatic performance - Members may dress in costume and/or employ the use of props (usually handmade) to mime to the audience a scene described or suggested by the announcer's script. Such scenes are often overdramatic (to aid audience members seated far away) and make use of slap-stick comedy, where appropriate (or not). Members of the Yale Precision Marching Band who act on the field are called "squids."

== Particular ensembles ==
This style is practiced mainly by a number of college marching bands, primarily in academically elite or liberal arts schools such as the Ivy League colleges (excepting Cornell University; the Cornell Big Red Marching Band performs in the corps style seen in more traditional bands); Rice University Marching Owl Band (known by its acronym, The MOB); Leland Stanford Junior University Marching Band; Villanova; William & Mary; Humboldt State Marching Lumberjacks; and DePauw University.

The Brown University Band has performed on ice skates at Brown Hockey games since 1970 and claims to be the world’s best (and, actually, only) ice skating scatter band. It is noteworthy to mention that many members are novice skaters, and that most have no previous experience skating while playing an instrument.

Besides school scatter bands, there are other traditional arenas for similar comic treatments of outdoor marching music, such as mummers parades, the pre-Rose Parade parody known as The Doo Dah Parade, Chinatown parades, Mardi Gras parades, etc.

== Stunts, antics, and tomfoolery ==
Scramble bands are notorious for their irreverent stunts, and some of these prove to be controversial. The most upsetting events usually have consequences (see also: censorship) regardless of whether the band intended such controversy. Listed below are some of the more notable events in scramble band lore:

- The Princeton University Band was attacked by a group of cadets at The Citadel prior to a football game on September 20, 2008, while marching around the campus. Several Citadel officials apologized for the altercation, including The Citadel's President Lt. Gen. John W. Rosa and the student body president; no action was taken by either school against the Band. (The incident ultimately did not prevent The Citadel from visiting Princeton for a football game in September 2009; that game went on without incident from either side.)
- Columbia's altar-boy joke (tuition going down faster than...) at halftime of a football game against Fordham, a nearby Catholic school.
- UVA's Inbred Family Feud gag against West Virginia. This was one of the events which ultimately led to the athletic department barring the band from attending all revenue sports in 2003.
- The Stanford Band accidentally rushed the field during the Big Game against rival Cal, mistakenly believing the game was over. This memorable accident became known as The Play, and is often seen on highlight reels. The field invasion prompted Cal announcer Joe Starkey to famously shout, "The band is on the field!"
- More recently, Stanford's band was disciplined for a show with jokes about polygamy during a game against Brigham Young University in September 2004.
- The Rice University MOB (Marching Owl Band) launched a weather balloon-based "UFO", eventually tracked by bewildered air traffic controllers.
- Yale was banned from West Point because of the nature of the script to be performed that day. The YPMB responded the following year at Yale, with a halftime show where band members sarcastically announced, "We are all Americans and we are all the same."
- Another Yale halftime featured the marriage of two former band members. ("At Yale, Wedding Band Takes On a New Meaning", New York Times, October 10, 1992.)
- Dartmouth was banned from Holy Cross for a show that involved a Ted Kennedy Triathlon which included the "Ted Kennedy drive and swim," a parody of the Chappaquiddick affair. Members of the Kennedy family were in attendance, and needless to say, were not pleased. The Dartmouth Band was allowed back for the first time in 2004, but did not attend due to a limited travel budget.
- The Lady Godiva Memorial Bnad [sic], made up of engineering students at the University of Toronto, attended the Bloor-Danforth subway opening on February 26, 1966, and "leapt over turnstiles", with 400 students piling onto a train. One student then pulled the emergency power switch, interfering with regular service for more than 5 hours on the first day of the subway line's operation.
- Michigan Technological University's Huskies Pep Band is banned from playing at rival school Northern Michigan University's campus, allegedly due to taking away home field advantage. The Huskies Pep Band is one of the largest student organizations at the university, with more than 100 students on its active roster. During a 2004 Grand Valley State-Michigan Tech football game at Ann Arbor's Big House, the band performed a Monty Python halftime show, where they played a rendition of "Every Sperm is Sacred" while forming an egg that was then fertilized by a sousaphonist sperm.

Occasionally, the tables are turned. The Texas A & M Aggies misinterpreted a 1973 performance of Rice's Marching Owl Band and formed an angry mob outside Rice's own stadium, trapping the Owl band inside for hours until police dispersed some of the crowd and allowed the band to exit, transported by food service trucks.

== Censorship ==
In recent years, administrators at many schools have taken steps to rein in their scramble bands' more embarrassing attempts at humor. These have included:

- Requiring approval of show content
- Replacing student leaders with university faculty or staff
- Refusing to allow the band to perform (a step occasionally also taken by a host school during away games)
- Change the style of band, like how Cornell is the only Ivy League school with a corps-style band.
- Dissolution of the band, like how Columbia’s band was dissolved in 2020.
