= Joseph A. O'Hare =

American Jesuit editor and educator (1931–2020)

- Born: Joseph Aloysius O'Hare; February 12, 1931; West Bronx, New York City, U.S.
- Died: March 29, 2020 (aged 89); The Bronx, New York City, U.S.
- Education: Berchmans College, Cebu City, Philippines
- Occupations: Editor, America; President, Fordham University

Joseph Aloysius O'Hare (February 12, 1931 – March 29, 2020) was a Jesuit priest, New York City civic leader and editor. He was president of Fordham University from 1984 to 2003 and chaired New York City's Campaign Finance Board for its first fifteen years from 1988 to 2003.

== Early life ==
O'Hare was born in the Bronx, New York City, on February 12, 1931, one of three children born to Joseph O'Hare, a member of the New York City Police Department's Mounted Division, and Marie Enright O'Hare, a New York City schoolteacher and guidance counselor.

He graduated from Regis High School in 1948. He entered the Jesuit order on July 30 of that year. He later said his inspiration for becoming a Jesuit was Rev. John Corridan (1911–1984), whose populist activism later provided the inspiration for the film On the Waterfront (1954). He trained for the priesthood in the Philippines, earning a bachelor's degree in 1954 and a master's degree in 1955 from Berchmans College in Cebu City. (Note: During these years he became acquainted with Philippine first lady Imelda Marcos: "I knew Mrs. Marcos pretty well. I used to play the piano for her over in the Philippines when I was a scholastic.") He was ordained a priest on June 17, 1961, at Fordham University and took his final vows as a Jesuit there on August 15, 1965. He taught at Ateneo de Manila University from 1955 to 1958 and again from 1967 to 1972. He received licentiate degrees in philosophy and theology from the Jesuits' Woodstock College in Maryland and earned a doctorate in philosophy from Fordham in 1968.

== Career ==
O'Hare was associate editor of the Catholic weekly America from 1972 to 1975 and was editor in chief from 1975 to 1984. His column "Of Many Things" received awards from the Catholic Press Association four times. He was also superior of the America House Jesuit community.

=== Educator ===
He was named president of Fordham University in March 1984, its first and only Bronx-born president. In 1991, he led a successful $150 million fundraising campaign, then the largest ever by a Jesuit university; he ultimately increased the endowment by a factor of seven. During his tenure the University expanded in both the Bronx and Manhattan, adding 1.1 million square feet of teaching and residential space. The student population changed from 70% commuters to 70% residents and from 75% drawn from the New York metropolitan region to 60% from outside New York.

O'Hare was chairman of the Association of Jesuit Colleges and Universities and the Association of Catholic Colleges and Universities (ACCU). In those roles and at Fordham, he dealt with conflicts between Catholic doctrine and academic freedom. In 1990 he expressed enthusiasm when the Vatican released its Apostolic Constitution on Catholic Universities, which acknowledged academic freedom and in which, as O'Hare said, "it came through loud and clear that universities all around the world were concerned about not having universal prescriptons from Rome."

At Fordham he allowed the student government to recognize advocacy groups as long as they promoted "enlightened discussion", including those organized around gay rights and abortion. He also asserted the right of American Catholic bishops to stake out positions on public policy. He opened one op-ed column with the disarming line: "I would like to say a word for the right of the American Roman Catholic bishops to be wrong." He called the criticism that the bishops were trying to impose their views a "tiresome argument, an objection answered many times". He acknowledged that the rhetoric on both sides of the abortion debate was at times lamentable–"Not every Catholic will be comfortable with the narrowness sometimes displayed"–and expressed sympathy for President Gerald Ford who had been attacked by both sides for his position on access to abortion. He concluded: "It is neither anti‐Catholic nor unAmerican to argue against the bishops in this debate, but to question their right to be heard is a persistent form of bigotry."

He received ten honorary degrees while at Fordham. He retired as president in 2003.

=== Civic roles ===
O'Hare was a trustee of the Asia Society. In 1986 he joined a study mission it sponsored to the Philippines. He was also a member of the Council on Foreign Relations.

O'Hare accepted appointments to several government bodies while at Fordham. In March 1986, New York City Mayor Edward I. Koch, in an attempt to isolate himself from pressure to make politically motivated appointments, created a five-person Committee on Appointments, which assessed applicants for membership on a variety of city commissions. O'Hare was one of the original members, who served three-year terms without salary. (Note: The Commission's mandate covered members of the Board of Standards and Appeals, Civil Service Commission, Tax Commission, Landmarks Preservation Commission, Art Commission, Taxi and Limousine Commission; also members, but not the chairmen, of the City Planning Commission, Board of Health and Environmental Control Board.) That same year Koch also named him to the 15-person New York City Charter Revision Commission, formed in response to a federal court ruling that found the structure of the city's government, specifically its Board of Estimate, unconstitutional.

In 1988 Koch named O'Hare the first chairman of the city's five-person Campaign Finance Board, which oversaw the public financing of municipal elections, allocating funds to candidates who agreed to adhere to restrictions designed to make candidates independent of large contributors. His reappointment in 1993 became the focus of a dispute between Mayor David Dinkins and his successor Rudolph Giuliani. Dinkins did not replace O'Hare when his term expired in March 1993, and O'Hare continued to preside over the Board. After the Board fined Dinkins' campaign for finance violations during the November mayoral election, Dinkins replaced O'Hare on December 30, 1993, just as his term as mayor expired, a move widely seen as retribution. Giuliani prevailed on O'Hare's replacement to resign and he named O'Hare to a second five-year term. (Note: The website of the New York City Campaign Finance Board does not acknowledge any interruption in O'Hare's service as chair in 1993 or 1994.) Though the Board fined Giuliani's 1997 mayoral campaign for violations, Giuliani reappointed him again in 1998 and O'Hare served until he retired of his own accord in March 2003.

In 2003, Mayor Michael Bloomberg named him to another Charter Revision Commission, tasked with considering several modest reforms and one controversial one: eliminating party primaries for municipal offices and making those elections non-partisan. O'Hare was in the minority in opposing non-partisan elections, and 70% of voters opposed the change in the November 2003 balloting.

The Citizens Union of New York City awarded him its Civil Leadership Award in 1992. Common Cause/New York recognized his work as chair of the New York Campaign Finance Board during its first ten years with its I Love an Ethical New York Award in 1999.

== Later years ==
When he retired from Fordham in 2003, he returned to America as associate editor, retiring from that post in 2009 at the age of 78. He was President of Regis High School for the academic year 2004–2005.

He died on March 29, 2020, of liver cancer at Murray-Weigel Hall, a Jesuit retirement hall and infirmary at Fordham University in Fordham, the Bronx, at the age of 89. His funeral Mass was held privately because of restrictions maintained during the COVID-19 pandemic. U.S. Supreme Court Justice Sonia Sotomayor, who like O'Hare was one of the first appointees to the Campaign Finance Board, called him "one of my heroes." She wrote: "Brilliant, witty, kind, gentle but firm, he lived his life caring and giving to so many.... The nation, the city of New York and the Bronx have lost a great man." The chair of the Campaign Finance Board called him "a towering figure in the history of New York City politics" and credited him for the Board's "culture of conviction and integrity" that has made it "a national model".
