= Marching Owl Band =

Marching band of Rice University

- School: Rice University
- Location: Houston, Texas
- Conference: AAC
- Founded: 1916; 109 years ago
- Director: Chuck Throckmorton
- Website: mob.rice.edu

The Marching Owl Band (aka The MOB or the Blues Band of South Main) is the Rice University "marching band" in the sense that it is the official ensemble that performs during football games, some basketball games, parades, and other public events. There are over 100 members. However, the MOB is not a traditional marching band, but rather a scatter band; members do not march, and some members play non-standard instruments (or no instrument at all). For example, in recent seasons these instruments included violins, violas, a cello, electric guitar, electric bass, electric piano, and even a harp. Extras known as Show Assistants are also a perennial inclusion in the MOB; these students play no instruments besides the kazoo (or an occasional didgeridoo), but are responsible for constructing and employing props in the halftime shows and acting out any mime or gag bits during performances. Rather than wear traditional marching band attire, The MOB instead dons pinstriped three-piece suits, ties, sunglasses, fedoras, and (in the case of Show Assistants) tommy gun props. (This attire is an obvious nod to the band's acronym, though in practice falls somewhere between the style of Capone-era mobsters and The Blues Brothers.) The group is known for satirical football halftime shows which, as MOB director Chuck Throckmorton says, poke fun at rival universities' sacred cows.

The MOB plays primarily classic rock-and-roll pieces, though blues, swing, funk, classical, and other styles are featured on various occasions. Its signature song is a rendition of "Louie Louie", a hit from the 1960s originally performed by the Kingsmen. Other staples include "Bonnet" (adapted from "Put on Your Old Grey Bonnet", 1909), the Rice University Fight Song (played after every Rice touchdown at football games), and "Turning it Loose" (a variation of the Otis Redding and Steve Cropper blues hit "I Can't Turn You Loose" similar to the one used as The Blues Brothers' theme song).

== History ==
=== Formation and early years ===
Formed in 1916, the Rice Owl Band consisted of twelve enterprising students from all colleges of the university. In 1922, under the leadership of Mr. Lee Chatham, the band grew from thirty-five to about fifty pieces. Rehearsals were held in Autry House, across Main Street from campus. During this period, however, there were few high school bands, so civic and municipal bands and private teachers supplied the main body of membership.

Mr. Kit Reid stepped up as director following Mr. Chatham's retirement in 1938.

During the period of World War II, manpower shortages that plagued other areas also hit the band, prompting Hugh Saye and Dick Kincheloe to form a band under the V-12 program consisting of Navy cadets supplemented by civilians from the student body.

After the war, the band was reorganized, and the first women, four majorettes, joined the previously all-male organization. Neel Cotten completed the academic year as director following Mr. Reid's retirement in 1950. In 1951, Holmes McNeely became director and instituted a building program of both equipment and personnel. Mr. McNeely was the first to offer a number of band scholarships to students involved with the Rice Owl Band. At this time, women musicians were added to the general Rice band for the first time.

Upon the retirement of Mr. McNeely in 1967, Mr. Bert Roth took charge of band activities. In the fall of 1968, he gave a work scholarship to every qualified member of the Rice Owl Band in recognition of their participation. The Rice Owl Band broke with tradition in 1970 and began to introduce timely and sometimes controversial topics into their halftime activities. With their tongues firmly planted in their cheeks, the band parodied politics, life at Rice, and other members of the Southwest Conference. During this period the band also gradually stopped marching and began the "scattering" techniques for which it is now known. This type of entertainment proved popular with band members, since the rehearsal time necessary to learn a show was greatly reduced, thus becoming more manageable in conjunction with a full academic course load. These shows also become popular with Rice's proudly irreverent student body.

=== Modernization ===
Dr. Ken Dye took over the director's job in 1980. By emphasizing musical quality and contemporary show design, the band (now called the Marching Owl Band, or the MOB) could target and entertain a larger audience. In 1982, Dye updated the MOB's uniforms, playing to the "mob" angle of the band's acronym and introducing the gray felt fedoras that have ever since been the band's trademark. Dr. Dye's tenure at Rice saw MOBsters perform at the Opening Ceremonies of the 1984 Olympics, the 1985 Presidential Inauguration, the 1986 Statue of Liberty Celebration and U.S. Olympic Festival, as well as the 1993 Carnivale in Nice, France. Dr. Dye believed that travel was an important part of any major college band. During his time as MOB director, the band accompanied the football team to places as far afield as Tulane, Notre Dame, and the campuses of all three military service academies.

However, even with all of these notable accomplishments during his term at the helm, Dr. Dye's greatest legacy continues to be the library of musical arrangements that he has left to the band. A prolific arranger, during his time at Rice Dye arranged literally hundreds of tunes for the MOB to perform (as well as many that have been published and used by other schools). Among the MOB repertoire are first-class arrangements of many rock, jazz, and blues standards, from China Grove to Proud Mary, Hawai’i 5-0 to Mortal Kombat, Rock Lobster to Vehicle.

=== Disaster and rebirth ===
In the spring of 1995, a fire in the Rice Memorial Center gutted much of the MOB band hall, as well as campus hang-out Willy's Pub and other parts of the RMC. Devastated, members of the band wondered how the MOB could possibly recover. However, a move out of the aging band hall had already been planned, and this move was merely accelerated. Still, the MOB was forced to rebuild, working from a new band hall and purchasing new instruments, new uniforms, new equipment, new computers, and new office supplies all in time for the fall 1995 football season. On St. Patrick's Day, 1997, the MOB released a CD called MOB Reborn, featuring 25 of the band's favorite and most popular numbers.

=== Turmoil and succession ===
In 1996, the Southwest Conference disbanded. Rice, Southern Methodist University, and Texas Christian University joined the Western Athletic Conference, while traditional SWC opponents such as the University of Texas, Texas A&M University, Baylor University, and Texas Tech University went to the Big 12. The resulting WAC swelled to an arguably unwieldy size, including schools from 16 states across 6 time zones. While this period saw the MOB travel to new locations such as California, it was also a significant adjustment for students and fans.

In 1997, Dr. Dye left Rice to rebuild the band program at the school now known as University of West Georgia, a position he held for only one year before moving on to a directorship at the University of Notre Dame in the fall of 1998. Mr. Sean Williams was hired in the summer of 1997 to serve the MOB and the Rice Band Department as interim director until a permanent replacement for Dye could be found. That replacement was Dr. Robert Cesario, who came from Tulsa, Oklahoma and took up the baton in the fall of 1998. After four years, Dr. Cesario resigned as Director of Rice Bands in the summer of 2002, and was succeeded by Mr. Charles Throckmorton.

In 2005, Rice joined Conference USA (C-USA), restoring cross-town rival, the University of Houston, to the status of conference opponent for the first time since the breakup of the Southwest Conference. The two are no longer conference rivals following UH's 2013 departure for the American Athletic Conference. Despite considerable membership turnover in C-USA in the early 2010s, the league still brings Rice into contact with opponents from Texas to the Eastern Seaboard.

In October 2021, Rice announced it was joining the American Athletic Conference in 2023. Using this move as justification, the school's athletics department chose to create a new pep band for basketball and volleyball games without consulting members of The MOB. The Rice community was outraged at all levels, but as of October 2022, the decision was yet to be reversed.

== Satire and controversy ==
The MOB "pokes fun at itself and the world", from political figures to Rice administration personnel to visiting teams. A few shows in particular have provoked more than the usual uproar:

- In 1973 the Texas A&M Aggies took exception to a MOB performance which featured such typical MOB irreverence as Nazi-style goosestepping, turning the Aggie War Hymn into "Little Wooden Soldier March", and forming a fire hydrant while playing "Oh Where, Oh Where Has My Little Dog Gone?" in reference to the Aggie mascot Reveille. After the game, the Aggies formed an angry mob outside Rice's own stadium, trapping the Owl band inside for hours until police dispersed some of the crowd and allowed the band to exit, transported by food service trucks. In the years after this now-infamous show, attention has been focused on the shot at Reveille, and that this was an attempt to mock the mascot shortly after her death; in fact it was no more than "poorly-aimed scatological humor", the mascot in question having been alive and present at the game.
- In 2007, the MOB used their halftime performance to poke fun at the legal woes facing some members of the Texas Longhorns. The band, wearing dark sunglasses, opened with the theme from Dragnet. Three members dressed as Longhorn football players ran around the field being chased by other band members carrying cardboard police cars. The Rice announcer narrated: "In the two years since the MOB last visited Austin, your team's demeanor — and misdemeanor — has changed. Buy a program at today's game. It includes Mack Brown's wrist-slap Top 10 and a photo guide to the next episode of America's Most Wanted."
- In 2011, the season opener against Texas in Austin saw the MOB form $EC during halftime as a commentary regarding Texas A&M leaving the Big 12 Conference and moving to the Southeastern Conference. This happened days before A&M announced its withdrawal from the Big 12 Conference and upcoming move to the SEC.
- In 2016, during the halftime performance of Rice's game against Baylor, the band formed the roman numerals "IX" in reference to Title IX, the federal law at the center of an offseason sexual assault scandal at Baylor. They also made the shape of a star while playing the song "Hit The Road Jack," alluding to the firing of former Baylor president Ken Starr in the wake of the scandal.
