= Syracuse University Alma Mater =

Alma Mater for Syracuse University

- Alma Mater
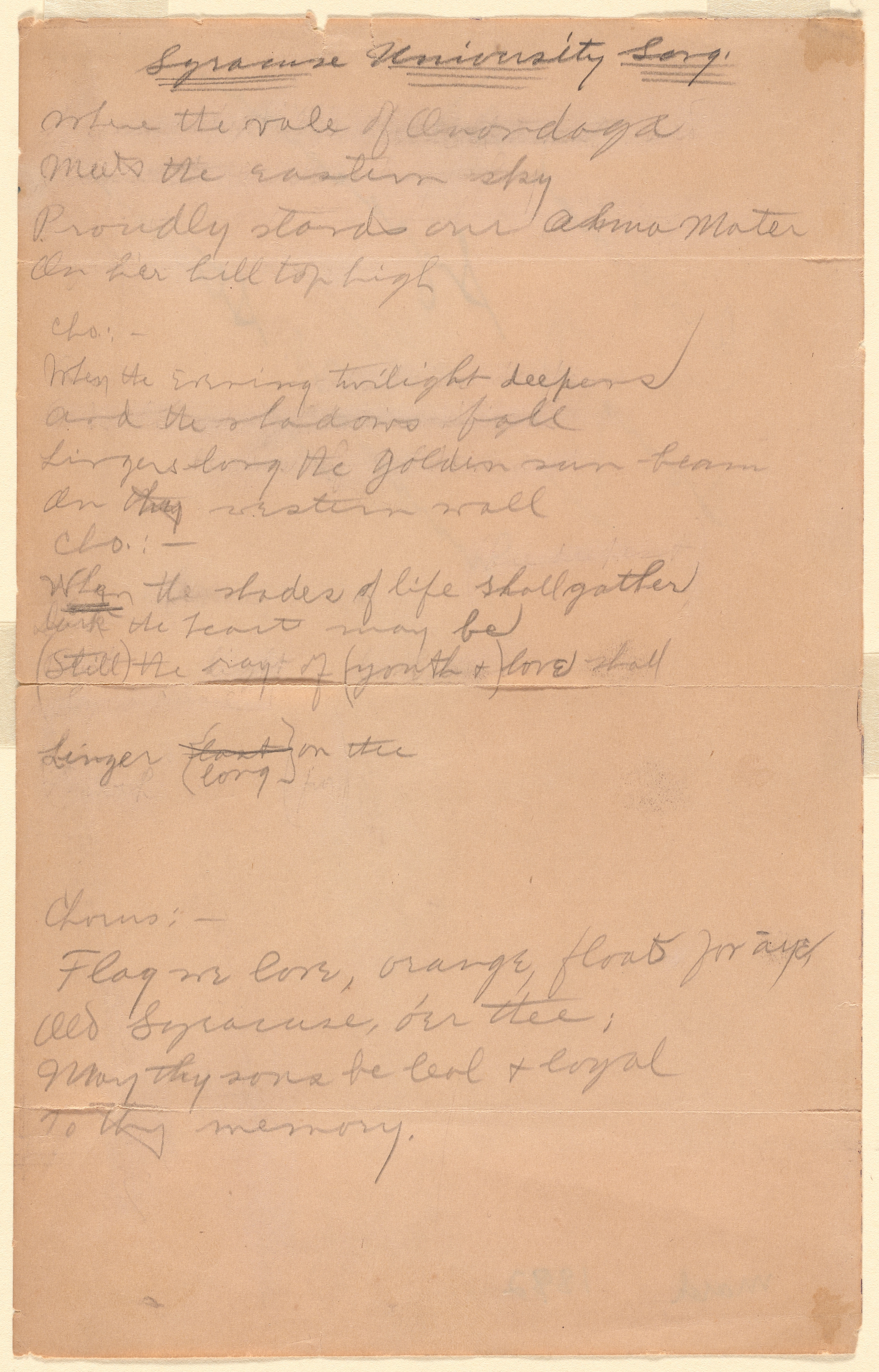
- Original handwritten copy c. 1893
- Other name: Song of Syracuse; Flag We Love
- Year: March 15, 1893; 133 years ago
- Related: Down the Field (Fight song)
- Text: by Junius W. Stevens
- Melody: Annie Lisle

Premiere
- Date: 15 March 1893
- Location: Wieting Opera House
- Performers: Syracuse University Glee and Banjo Club

The Syracuse University Alma Mater is the school song for Syracuse University. It was written by Junius W. Stevens in 1893, and is based on the then-popular Irish melody Annie Lisle. It was first sung under the title "Song of Syracuse" by the University Glee and Banjo Club on March 15, 1893 at the Wieting Opera House.

== Early attempts ==
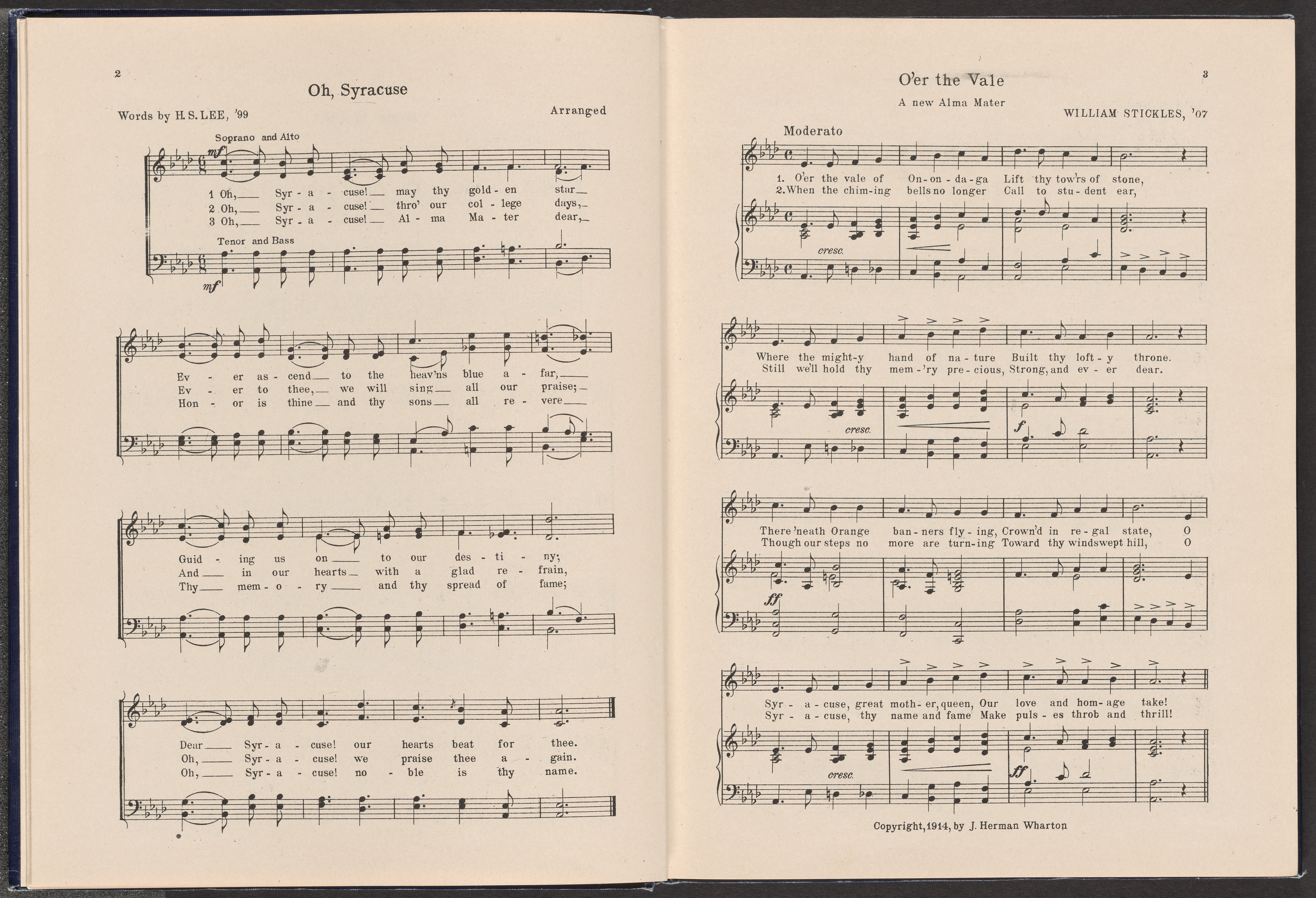
"Oh, Syracuse" and "O’er the Vale" from the Syracuse University Song Book (1920).

In the early years of Syracuse University, many compositions were created to provide the university with an alma mater, with four songs in particular standing out prominently. The very first of these came in 1871; a poem by Reverend George Lansing Taylor simply titled "Syracuse University Hymn". It was first sung at the laying of cornerstone for the Hall of Languages on August 31, 1871, and for next two decades at formal university functions.

Many compositions were proposed including by students and faculty alike; "Majestic Swells" by George W. Elliot ('73), "Waiting" by Melville J. Wells ('75), "All Hail" by George E. Smith ('76), "Alma Mater" by Alice E. Clark ('82), "Singing in the Hall" by Frank W. Noxon ('92), "O’er the Vale" by William C. Stickles ('07), "Alma Mater, Syracuse" by Professor John H. Clark, "Syracuse University Song" by librarian H. O. Sibley, but none stuck and students deplored the dearth of Syracuse Airs. "Oh, Syracuse", composed by Harry S. Lee ('99) in 1898 became popular among students and alumni and was first sung at the Athletic Benefit at the Wieting Opera House on 19 February 1898. Another addition to this collection was "Rally all ye Sons of Syracuse," composed by Professor Ernst Held in 1904. It was sung for the first time at the first annual banquet of the Central New York Alumni Association held at the Yates Hotel in Syracuse on 21 January 1904. In early 1904, the Albany Alumni Association released a pamphlet titled "Songs of Syracuse."

== Stevens' version ==
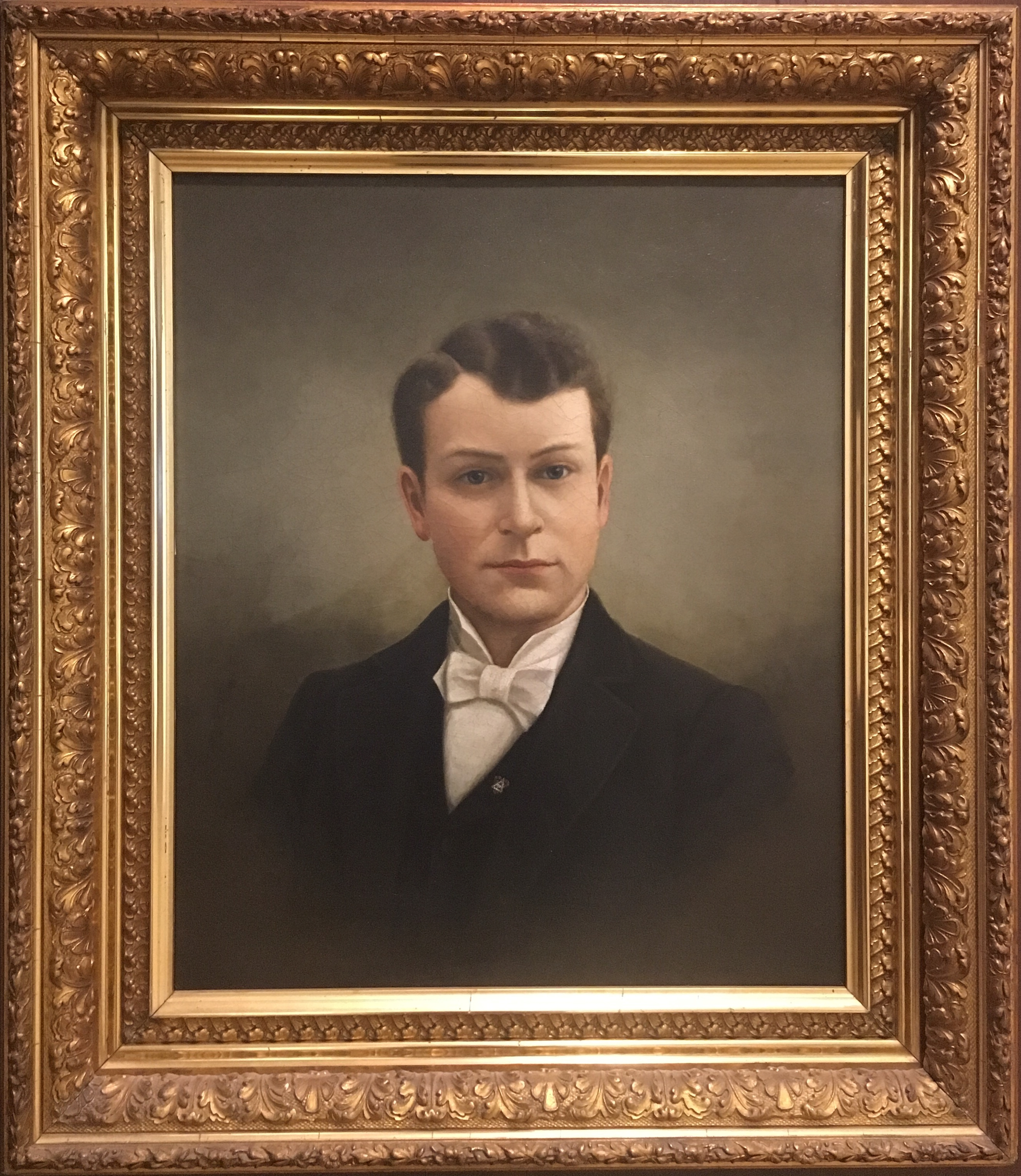
Portrait of Junius Stevens (c.1920).

Junius Woods Stevens' composition "The Vale of Onondaga," created in 1893, gained widespread popularity and became a general favorite. It first premiered in a March 15, 1893, performance by the University Glee and Banjo Club at the Wieting Opera House. The program for the event lists it under the original title of "Song of Syracuse", but it was also occasionally called "Flag We Love". While the original handwritten copy of the song includes three stanzas and a chorus, SU's athletics website only lists the verse and the chorus. (Note: Additional stanzas: When the evening twilight deepens and the shadows fall, Lingers long the golden sunbeam on thy western wall. When the shades of life shall gather, dark the heart may be, Still the rays of youth and love shall linger long o'er thee'.)

When initially performed, the song did not overly impress local papers and student interest seemed muted. It was revived next year by the Women's Glee Club to welcome incoming chancellor James Roscoe Day and at a benefit concerts. The tune is set to the tune of "Annie Lisle", a popular 1857 ballad by H. S. Thompson. The 1927, Intercollegiate Song Book lists the tune as Amici referring to an 1864 Yale University song that used Annie Lisle.

In a letter written to a Syracuse University staff member in 1939, author Junius W. Stevens recalled "while I was walking home across the city ... an idea for the song came to me. I had often noticed how the setting sun lighted up the walls of Crouse College long after dusk had fallen over the city and the valley. As I walked through the empty streets the words of a song took shape in my mind.By the time I reached home, the song was finished."

Multiple university Greek-life reports from early 1910s describe a practice of singing the alma mater after chapel, athletic events, and football games. A 1922, article in Printers' Ink magazine mentions the use of the alma mater in university's fundraising advertisements. The music arrangement was updated in the mid-1990s by the Syracuse University Marching Band. In 2009, the Syracuse Orange football team head coach Doug Marrone began a similar tradition and it was continued under Scott Shafer.

In the spring of 1986,Syracuse University amendeded the lyrics to the alma mater to promote inclusivity and to honor the institution's coeducational roots. The newer version replaced the line "May thy sons be leal [sic?] and loyal" with "Loyal be thy sons and daughters."The original handwritten copy was donated to the University archives in 1987, by Stevens' family, with additional material donations in 2014.

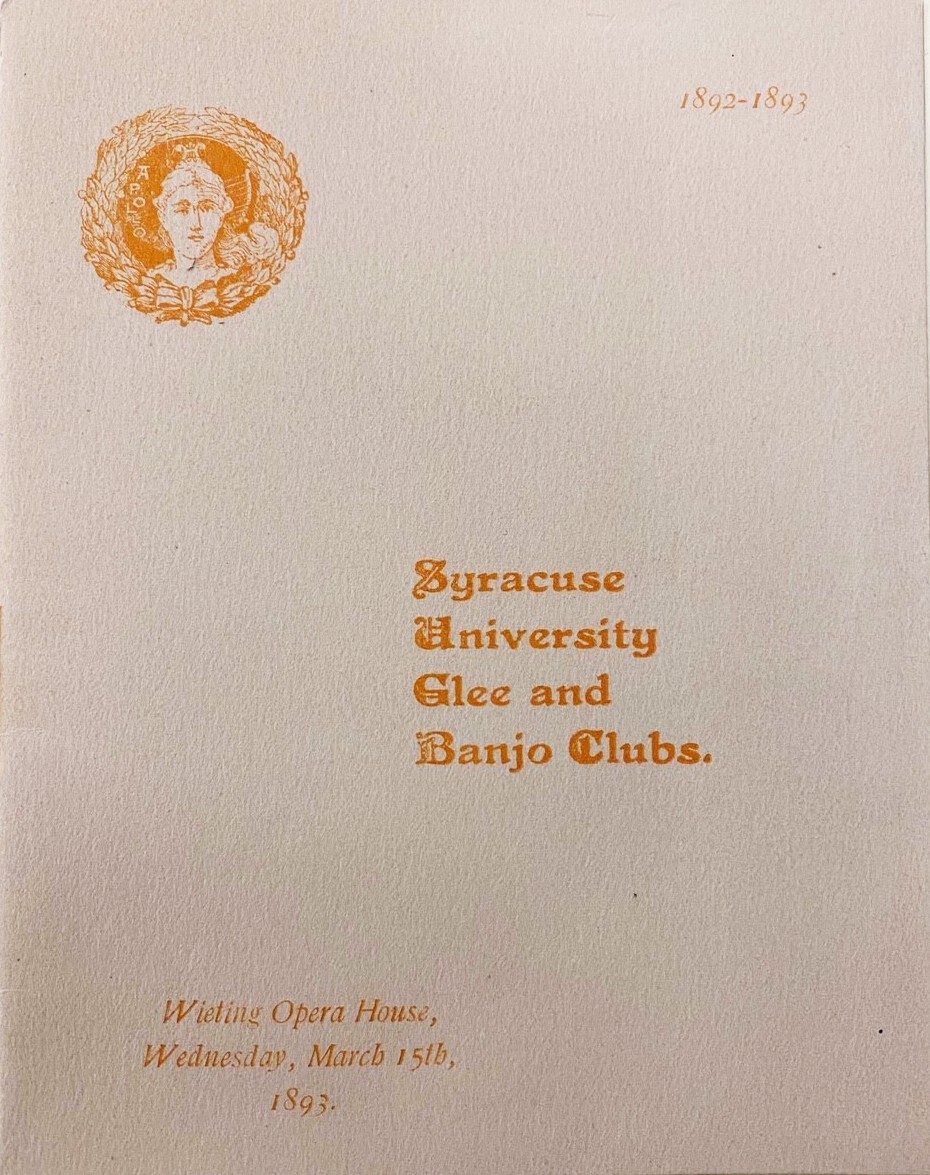
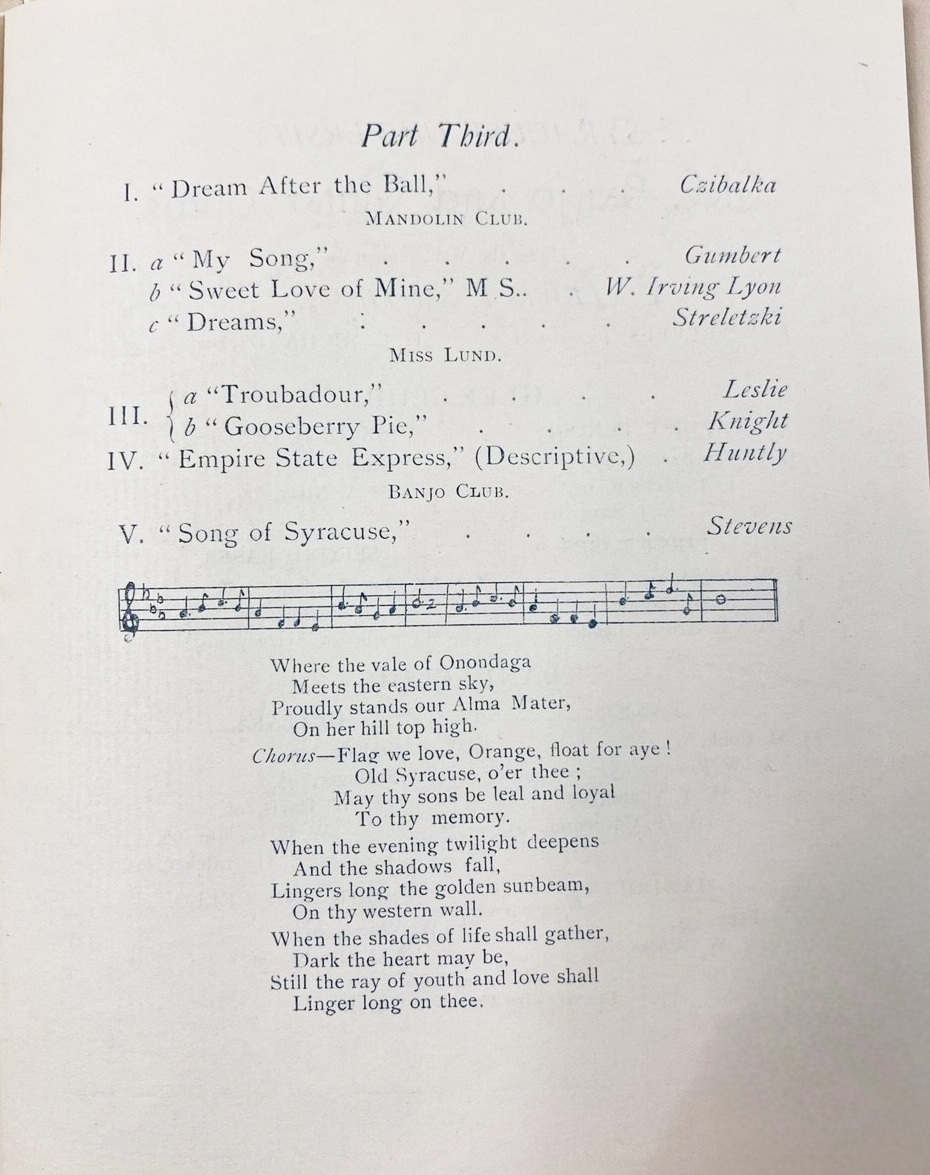
Program at the Wieting Opera House Wednesday March 15th, 1893.

=== Lyrics ===
Where the vale of Onondaga
Meets the eastern sky
Proudly stands our Alma Mater
On her hilltop high.

Flag we love! Orange! Float for aye-
Old Syracuse, o'er thee,
Loyal be thy sons and daughters
To thy memory.

== Fight song ==
The university also has a fight song entitled "Down the Field," commonly played after SU scores in athletic matches.
