= George Atwater =

American composer and arranger (1866–1931)

- Born: 1866
- Died: 1931 (aged 64–65)
- Other names: George Levi Atwater
- Occupations: Composer and arranger
- Notable work: Yale Boola!, African Dreamland: Intermezzo

George Levi Atwater (1866–1931) was a late 19th-early 20th century American composer and arranger from New Haven, Connecticut, and was a contemporary of ragtime songwriter, C.W. O'Connor. He is best known for his arrangements of Yale fight songs.

== Activity in New Haven ==
George Atwater is a name in the early American songbook from the Northeast, that makes itself situated in the ragtime subgenre and within popular music in the small city of New Haven. This college town is where Atwater composed and published some of his better-known works. He was active as a composer of marches in the 1890s, and dedicated one of his compositions from this period, "Pagter's Two Step", to Ralph S. Pagter, one of the most notable advertisers of the late 19th century in the United States. In 1900, Atwater's piece, "I Cannot Live Dear Without You", was debuted by opera singer Gemma Jewell-Robbia, protégé of Enrico Caruso. George Atwater was noticed as a composer of popular music from about the year 1903, when he co-wrote "African Dreamland: Intermezzo" with Yale student, C.W. O'Connor. This was first published by the Loomis Temple of Music, that of Chas. H. Loomis, formerly one of the largest music publishers in the state of Connecticut. It was later republished by Leo Feist of New York. African Dreamland was published for solo piano, voice and piano (arr. O'Connor), banjo, guitar as well as mandolin. Just two years earlier, Atwater had arranged the famous Yale Boola! song for publisher Chas. H. Loomis. Atwater's arrangement is still performed by the Yale Precision Marching Band of Yale University.

Atwater was active in New Haven as an arranger as well as bandleader until at least 1913, as listed in the Musical Directory of Connecticut for that year.

== African Dreamland and later works ==
African Dreamland became a popular piece of ragtime music, featuring a unique theme, compared to most early rags by that of Scott Joplin and others. One of the first public performances of the piece was by the Yale Mandolin Club at Boston Symphony Hall in Boston, Massachusetts, on November 20, 1903. A music reviewer from New Haven, where the music was originally published in 1903, described the piece as "an intermezzo full of beauty" and a "pure negro melody". It was widely performed by concert bands and orchestras and at school graduations and events in the early 1900s. The composer, George Atwater, had an association with Victor records as early as 1903 when African Dreamland was first recorded by Sousa's band. By 1907, it had also gained notoriety in Mexico and Germany, where it was re-published and orchestrated. Music publisher Leo Feist marketed African Dreamland as "A beautiful Darky number that sets the soul a singing". The piece is covered in Edwin Berlin's Ragtime: A Musical and Cultural History (2002), where it is described as a "genteel" addition to the ragtime repertoire. Norman C. Weinstein, author of A Night in Tunisia: Imaginings of Africa In Jazz (1992), described "African Dreamland" as a piece that set the tone for African exoticism and curiosity in early 20th century American life. Music theorist John Muniz analyzed the piece and its historical connotations at Yale in 2012, recording a fragment of the piano sheet music for the first time in nearly 100 years.

Recording of Sousa's band playing African Dreamland: Intermezzo, a rag by George Atwater

Atwater's composition was sold on wax cylinders, early shellac discs, piano rolls and on special discs for music boxes made by the Regina Company. It was being sold into 1912 on labels such as Zonophone. A rare recording was also made for Edison records by the New York Military Band in 1910.

It was henceforth that Atwater had many recording deals with Victor for use of his band arrangements by Arthur Pryor and his band. One of the first was the Yale fight song, "Men of Yale" march, recorded by Pryor's band in 1911.

Atwater would continue arranging and composing throughout the 1910s, during which time he published the march and two-step, "Troop A". He arranged music for various stage productions and composers until 1924, ceasing any new arrangements following this year. His last known composition was "'Tis Spring", with words written by Frances Marian La Roza, in 1925.

== Compositions and arrangements ==
George Atwater composed or where noted arranged the following:

- The Evening Leader March (1895)
- Second Company Governor's Foot Guard March (1896)
- Press Club March and Two-Step (1898)
- I Cannot Live Dear Without You (1900)
- Yale Boola! (1901), arrangement for Charles H. Loomis
- African Dreamland: Intermezzo (1903)
- Adelina, The Boola Girl (1903), first recorded by Edison Male Quartet
- Pro Yalensi March (1903), arrangement for Walter R. Cowles
- Pagter's Two Step
- Colors and Cheers (1909), arrangement for Seneca G. Lewis
- Men of Yale march (1909), arrangement recorded by Pryor's band
- Milena (1910), arrangement for James A. Miles
- Troop A: A calvary march and two step (1910)
- Blondie Mine (1912), arrangement for Thomas R. McCluskey
- Eli Yale: Dear old Yale (1911), arrangement recorded by Pryor's band, Haydn Quartet
- Whoop it Up! (1914), arrangement recorded by Pryor's band
- Good night Harvard (1914), arrangement for Loomis Temple of Music
- Stand by the flag that has stood by you (1917), arrangement for Clarence E. Billings
- Madana, song from The Glad Heart (1919), arrangement for T.R. McCluskey
- The Glad Heart (1920), arrangement for Thomas R. McCluskey
- Sweet Shetuckett Valley (1924), arrangement for Thomas F. McMahon
- 'Tis Spring (1925), F.M. La Roza and George L. Atwater

== See also ==
- George Atwater House, Hamden, Connecticut
