= Stanleigh P. Friedman =

American composer

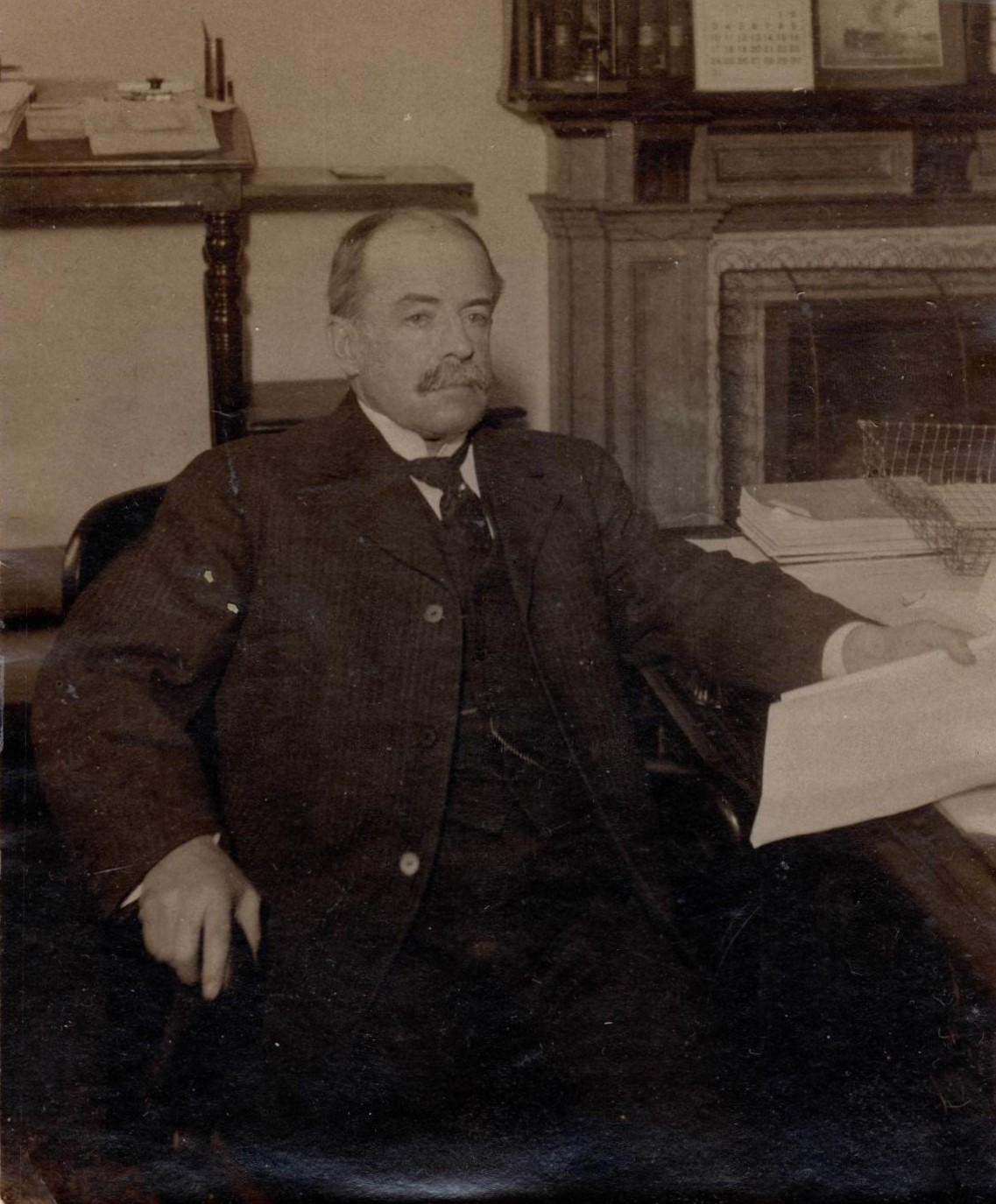
Portrait of composer Stanleigh P. Friedman

Stanleigh Pohly Friedman (1884 – 1960) was an early 20th century American composer of popular music. He is best known for writing the melody of the Yale fight song, Down the Field, also known as "March, March on Down the Field".

== Background and education ==
Friedman was born on August 12, 1884, in Albany, New York. He was a student in the Yale Law School, class of 1905, and Harvard, class of 1908. His interest in writing music was evident throughout his time at Yale. An interest he shared with his roommate, C.W. O'Connor. In addition to his law studies, he was involved with the Yale University Music School, led by professor and composer Horatio Parker. He wrote and published one of his first college songs in 1903, titled 'Neath the Elms', most likely inspired by the elm trees of the old Yale campus and surrounding New Haven, Connecticut. Friedman and O'Connor were the originators of one of Yale University's most celebrated fight songs, 'Down the Field', drafted in June 1904.

== March, March on Down the Field ==
Friedman penned the melody to 'Down the Field' while attending a lecture on economics, and it was first heard being sung publicly at a Yale-Princeton football match in the fall of 1904. The march song's success was felt throughout the United States, equaling the success of the 1901 Boola! song by Allan M. Hirsh. The march was published in New Haven, under the direction of publisher Chas. Loomis, who would later assign the rights to Leo. Feist in 1911. From this acquisition, 'Down the Field' march resurged in popularity in 1911, through sheet music sales as well as phonograph records. It was recorded by Arthur Pryor's Band, the Knickerbocker Quartet, the Shannon Four (Shannon Quartet) among many other vocal groups and concert bands in the 1910s. 'Down the Field' was also recorded by Rudy Vallee, Bunny Berigan and Kay Kyser.

By 1905, Stanleigh was well acquainted with the musical activities at Yale, and was elected President of the university orchestra. He directed the orchestra in a 1905 school production of "The Magistrate". In 1906, Friedman would write a follow-up composition to 'Down the Field' titled 'Whoop It Up', with words by Henry G. Dodge. This fight song was not as popular as his primary work. In 1920, he would publish 'Glory For Yale', with words by Julian Arnold. He recorded this march among others that same year for Okeh records as director with the New England Society Orchestra.

Thirty years after writing 'Down the Field', in 1935, he wrote and dedicated a limited campus store print of 'Sons of Eli' to his former roommate and co-writer, C.W. O'Connor.

== Later career ==
Friedman would practice law in New York by 1912 in the law firm of Friedman & Bareford I, but remained active in the entertainment industry. He was a founder of the film studios Octagon Films Inc. and Grossman Pictures Inc., led by Harry Grossman. He went on to becoming a director and vice president of Warner Bros. in 1931. He was active at Warner Bros. into the 1950s.

Friedman also served as President of the Schola Cantorum of New York and the Ballet Associates in America. Two arrangements of J.S. Bach's "Gavotte en Rondeau" and "Bist Du Bei Mir" by Friedman were performed by the New York Philharmonic. Friedman wrote religious music as well, including the works "God is My Trust" and "All Ye That Cleave Unto the Lord", a cantata.

== Legacy ==
Friedman's name can be found inscribed on the walls of Welch Hall at Yale for his contribution to the school's fight songs. 'Down the Field' is still performed by the Yale Bands today.
