= Syracuse University Marching Band =

College marching band

The "Pride of the Orange"
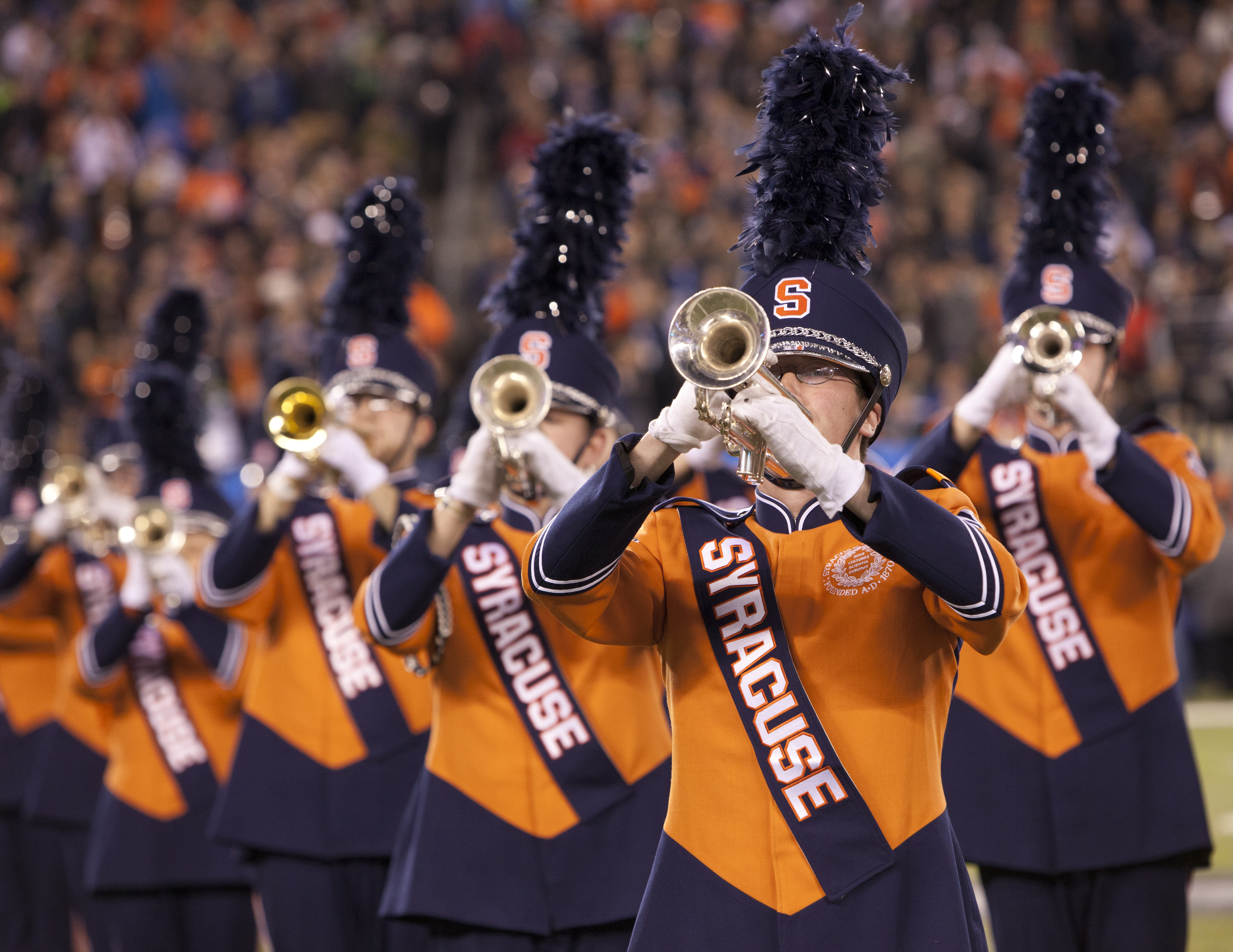
- The Syracuse University Marching Band performing before Super Bowl XLVIII.
- School: Syracuse University
- Location: Syracuse, New York
- Conference: ACC
- Founded: 1901; 125 years ago
- Director: Timothy Diem
- Members: 200
- Practice field: JMA Dome
- Fight song: "Down the Field"
- Website: band.vpa.syr.edu

The Syracuse University Marching Band (SUMB), also known as the Pride of the Orange, is the collegiate marching band of Syracuse University. The band consists of approximately 200 members. The SUMB performs at all home Syracuse Orange football games throughout the season in the Carrier Dome, and also takes part in parades and other performances throughout the year. It is one of the largest student organizations at Syracuse University, and one of the oldest collegiate bands in the United States.

It is one of the four bands on campus (others being the Wind Ensemble, the concert band and the pep band) that operate under the aegis of Setnor School of Music of College of Visual and Performing Arts. It is one of two bands on campus that appear at athletic events, the other being the Sour Sitrus Society, the university pep band.

== History ==
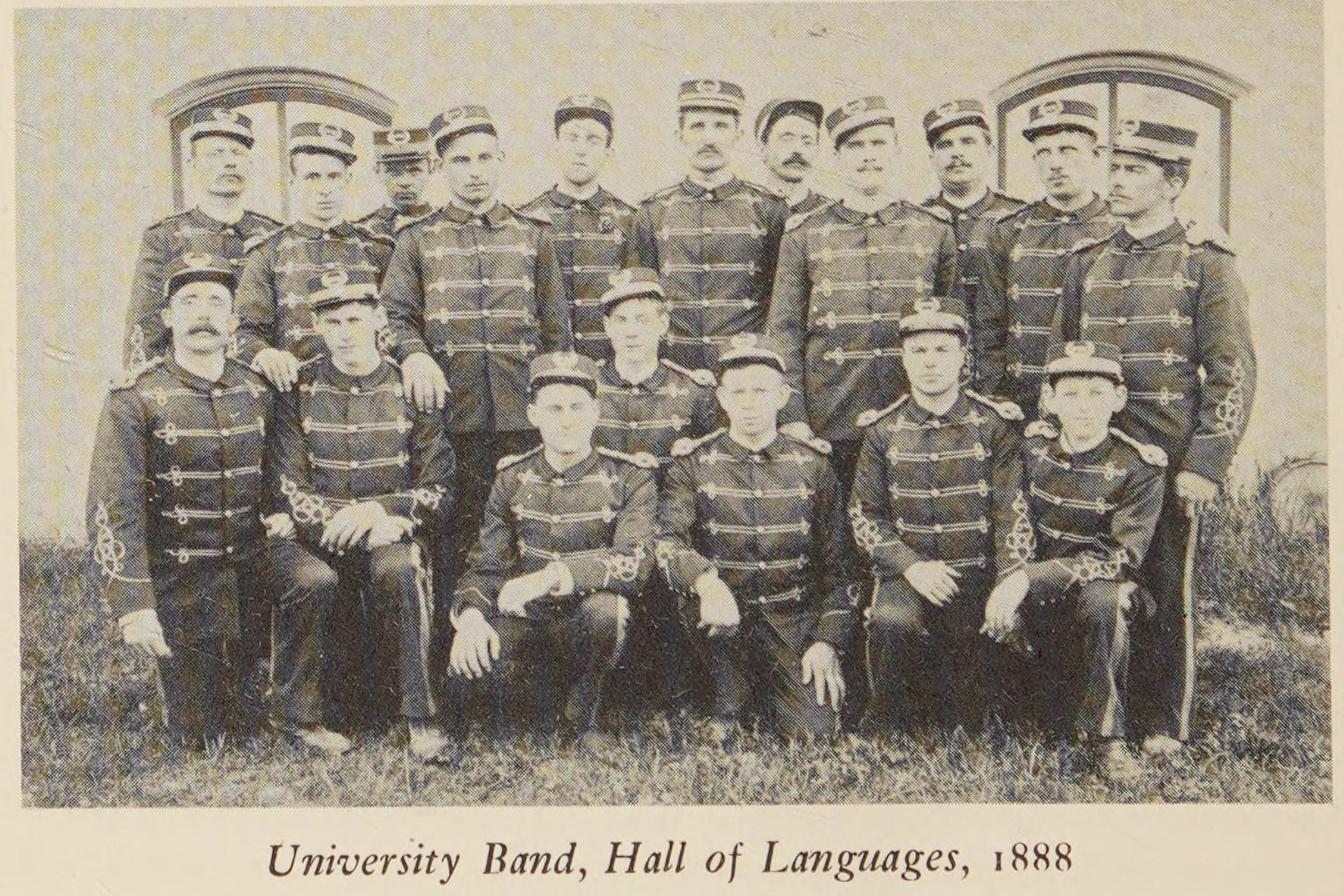
University Band in front of the Hall of Languages in 1888.

Photograph of Syracuse University cheerleaders, circa 1922-1923

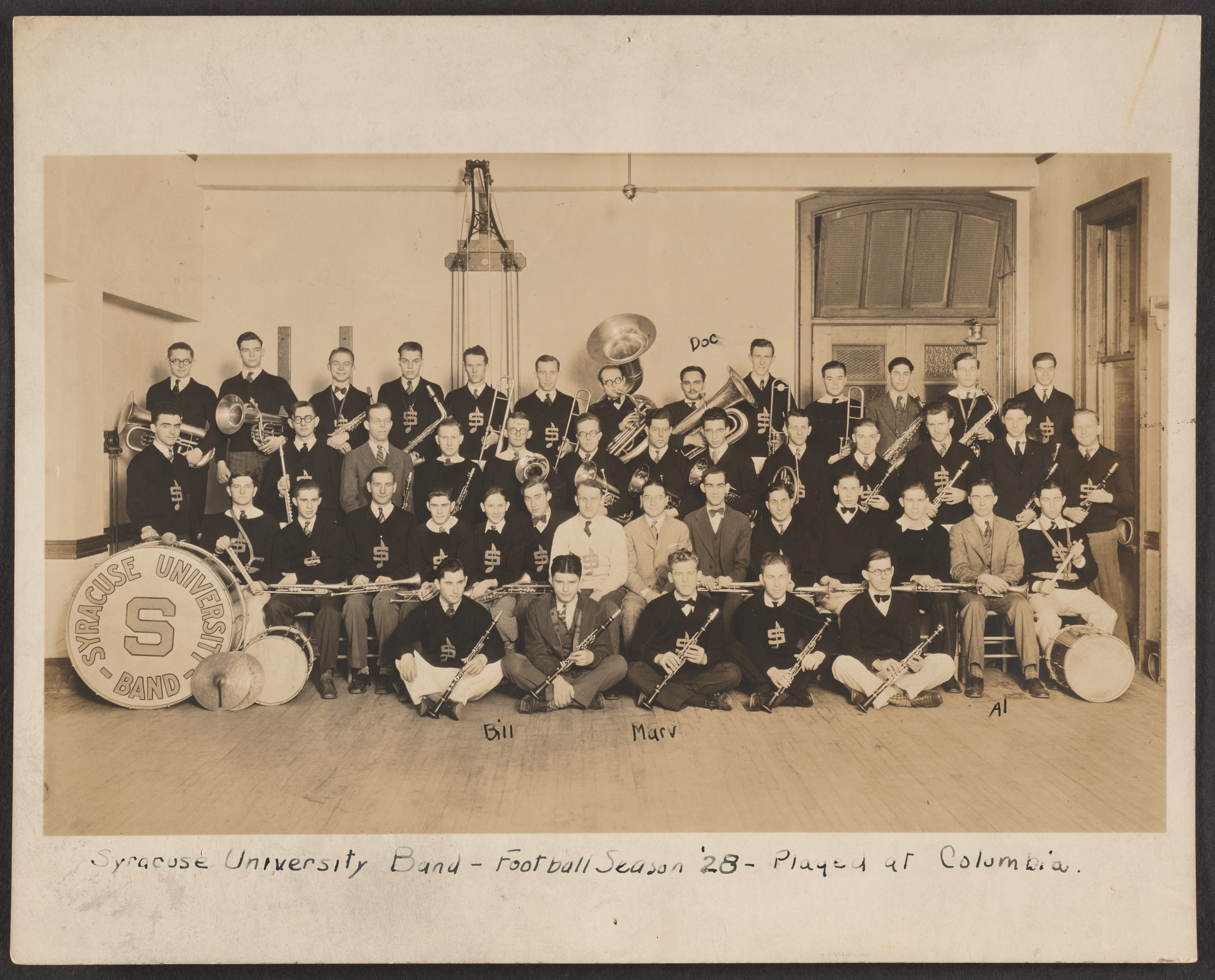
The Syracuse University Band in 1928.

=== Early years ===
Effort to establish a university band were immediate after the founding of the university. A glee club appeared in 1875, but "perished in the gentle spring of 1880." A brass band was formed in 1881 and the club traveled all the way to Florida for performances in 1886. Individual colleges would hire bands to perform at their events and athletic events.

The first marching band was formed in 1901, and the first rehearsal took place on February 4, 1901. The band performed its first public concert in Crouse College auditorium on May 9, 1901.

The 23 members performed at the Syracuse Orangemen football game appearance against Lafayette College on October 12, 1901, at the Old Oval. It was dissolved in 1904 for financial reasons by Chancellor James Roscoe Day but soon restored in 1907.

By the end of 1910s, the band had filled a needed role on campus and been utilized for campus functions, concerts, as well for home and away football games. When ROTC was established on campus in December 1919, the band was co-opted into cadet training program, merging with ROTC band. While the band had played at athletic events since founding, it officially broke off from ROTC in 1923 and partnered with the athletics department around 1925, It would later become part of the Fine Arts department (now VPA).

"Down the Field", Syracuse University's fight song, was first performed by the band on November 14, 1913. The band would play the song the following day during the Syracuse Orangemen football game against the Colgate team, which Syracuse lost 35–13. The band members would march across the Shaw Quadrangle to the stadium when performing at the Archbold Stadium.

The university began supporting the band financially in 1924, but noted it as a loss making activity. In 1926, the band under the direction of Marvin A. Fairbanks had a membership of about 60 students. In 1930, the band was broadcast for the first time on a radio, on WSYR radio station.

In 1947, a fire destroyed much of Archbold Gymnasium and with it the band lost all their uniforms, but the administration was supportive, and the group had new clothes, director, and equipment.

=== Orange Girl & national fame ===
The band was all male until September 26, 1947, when Howard Kelly, assistant director of the band asked twirling drum majorette Jessie Ann Harp (Griffing) to became part of the crew. Her performance was choreographed to the band's music. Featured baton twirlers – nicknamed Orange Girl in 1962 – were the only female member of the band.

The band shot to national fame in when the band performed at the 1953 Orange Bowl against Alabama. CBS carried the game, the first time it had ever been televised nationally. While the football team lost their first ever bowl game 61–6, the band achieved celebrity status – especially the baton twirler Dottie Grover – and was billed One hundred men and a girl by the media. Learbury Clothier of Syracuse had donated new uniforms of white straw hats, blue blazers, and slacks as the band went to the bowl in the humid south. The band, alongside Grover, toured nationally.

In 1966, Syracuse University changed its policies and opened the band to women and 22 women joined the band in the first year. For a brief period of time (1943–1947) during World War II, university had temporarily allowed women on the band to fill positions due to shortage of men.

In 1970, the band went on a European concert tour and participated in the World Band Festival in Kerkrade, Netherlands, winning three awards. They were welcomed back with much fanfare and when during the 1970 football opener game the announcer called them "The Pride of the Orange", the nickname stuck.

In 1971, the band participated in the Macy's Thanksgiving Day Parade.

The Eta Alpha chapter of Tau Beta Sigma band sorority and the Eta Phi chapter of Kappa Kappa Psi band fraternity. were established on December 4, 1982, by Dr. Robert Spradling, the then Director of the SUMB.

=== Recent years ===
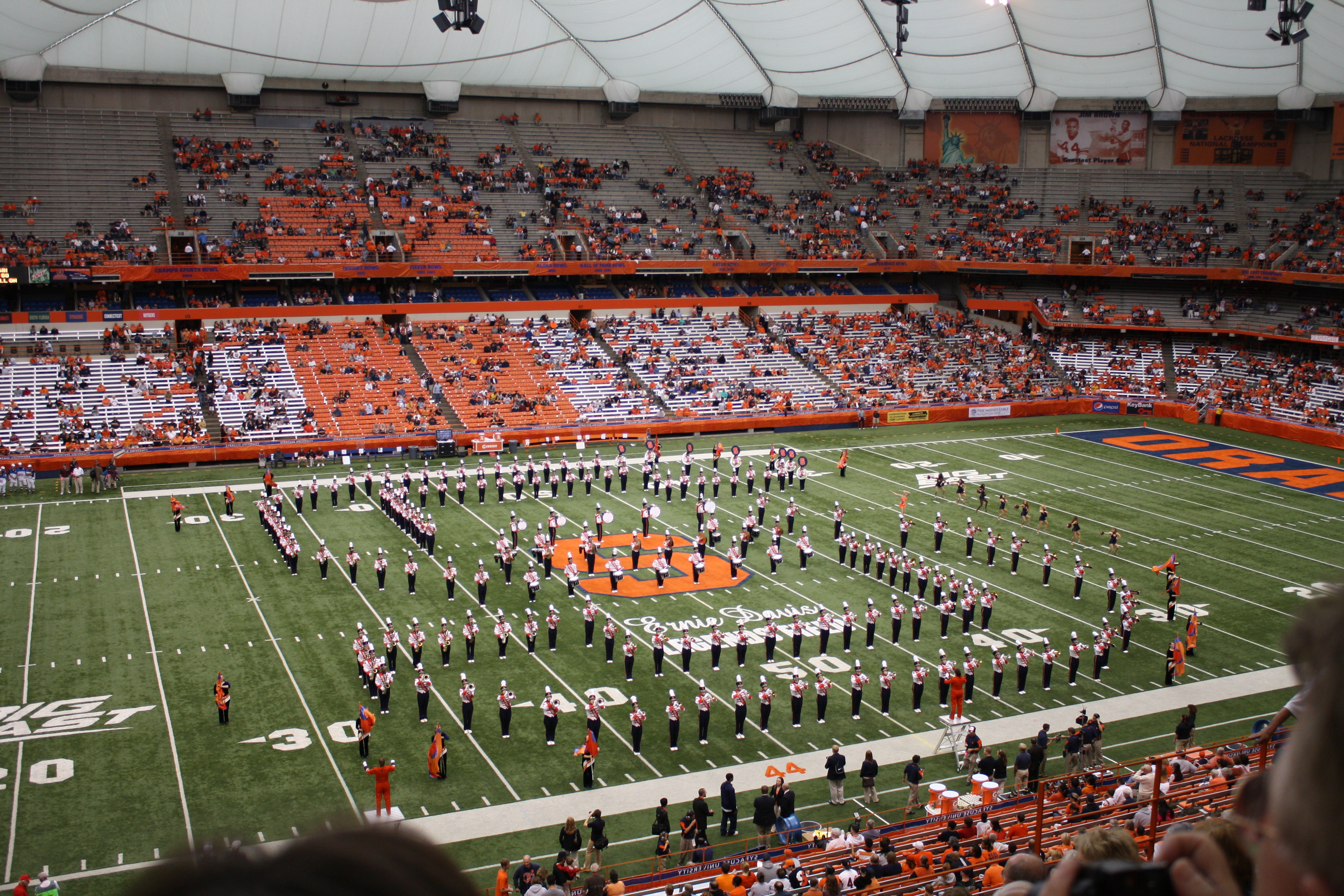
Themarching band "Block S" formation during the pre-game sequence.

On December 7, 2008, SUMB performed at first-ever NFL regular-season game played in Canada. The game played as part of the Bills Toronto Series featured the Buffalo Bills against the Miami Dolphins at the Rogers Centre in Toronto, Canada.

In 2009, the band recorded and released renditions of SU songs on the "Orange Album", an album released by Syracuse University Recordings, a student-run record label based out of the Setnor School of Music at the VPA.

In 2013, the college of Visual and Performing Arts launched a $150,000 campaign titled "A New Look for a New Era." for new uniforms. The college met its goal and the revamped uniforms were utilized in time for Syracuse's inaugural 2013 ACC football season. This was their first update in 15 years.

On February 2, 2014, SUMB performed at the Super Bowl XLVIII during the pregame festivities. They put on a New York/ New Jersey themed show alongside the Rutgers University Marching Scarlet Knights. The song selections included Born in the U.S.A. and Born to Run by Bruce Springsteen, Livin' on a Prayer by Bon Jovi, New York, New York by Frank Sinatra, and Empire State of Mind by Jay-Z.

The band has been a consistent presence at the annual Heisman Memorial Trophy Dinner Gala in New York City.

In 2014, a twirling scholarship was endowed by former Orange Girl Janet Kay Smith.

In 2016, the band played at the New Year's Day celebration in London.

== Membership ==
The band is marketed as "New York's college band", membership also features students from SUNY-ESF, Onondaga Community College, Le Moyne College, and SUNY Oswego.

The band is fall semester non-audition, one-credit course in the College of Visual and Performing Arts.

The band has 12 instruments in the ensemble.

Justin Mertz served as the band director from 2005 until 2017, and Timothy Diem took over in 2017.

The SU Alumni Band, is a band made up of former SUMB members and have performed at Syracuse Orange athletic events.

SUMB publishes "The Orange Peel: The Pride of the Orange", a twice-yearly newsletter. The Special Collections Research Center of the Syracuse University Archives holds an inventory of bands collection.

== Traditions ==
=== Quad Show and march-over ===
The band performs a show before every home game on the steps of Hendricks Chapel in the Shaw Quadrangle. The band sings the words to the fight song, as well as performs the Syracuse University Alma Mater both instrumentally, and vocally in four-part harmony.

At the finish of the quad show, the band lines up for "march-over". The band lines up in a parade block and then marches around the quad before heading over to the Carrier Dome. While marching, the band recites the SU Band Chant. Each section of the band demonstrates its own vocal responses and horn moves during march-over.

=== Banner flip ===
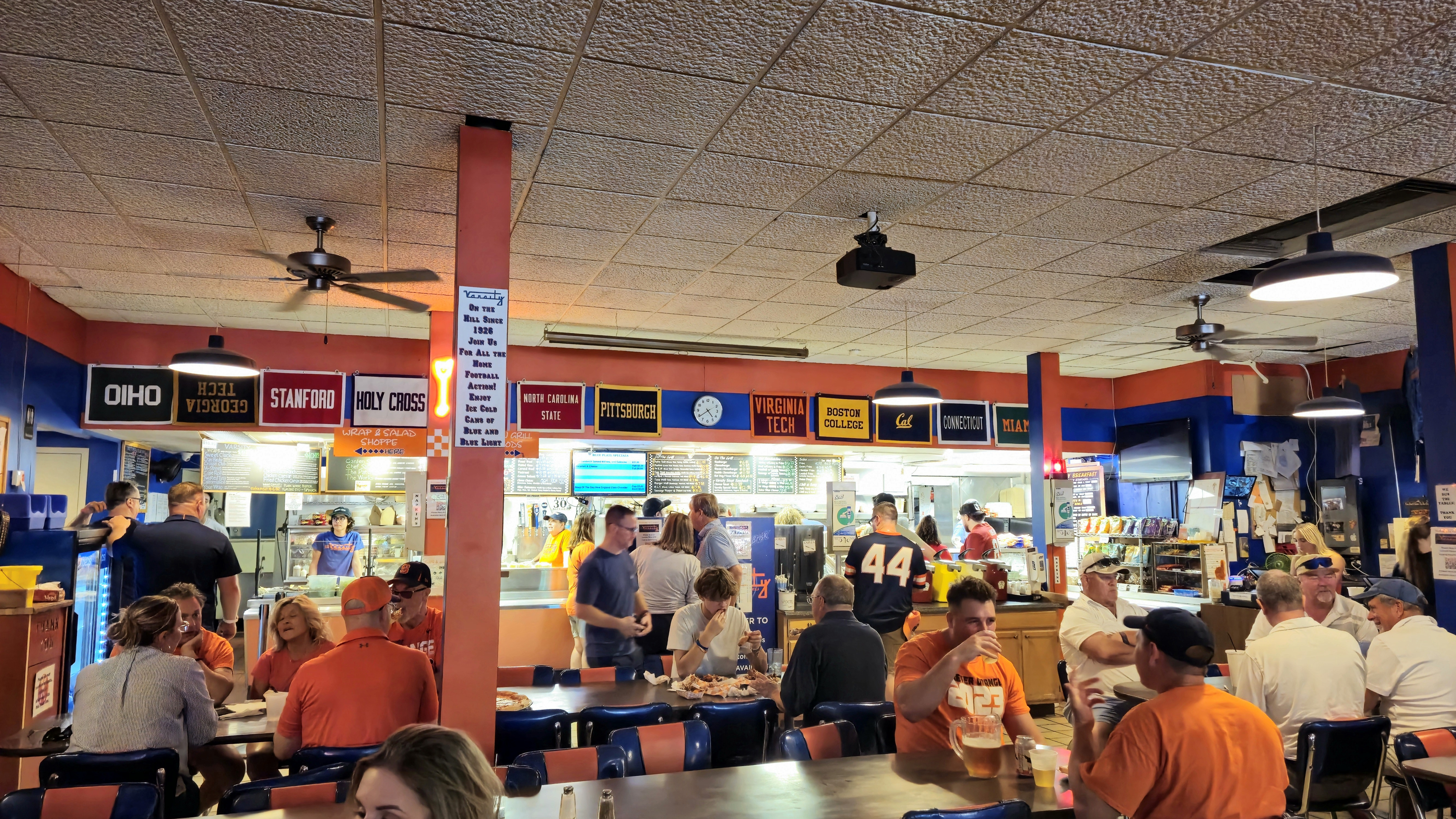
Banners at the Varsity Pizza on Marshall street.

After each football win, the band heads to Varsity Pizza on Marshall Street to flip the flag upside down. The band plays a few tunes and the banners of each Orange opponent hung along the back wall of the restaurant are flipped at the end if Syracuse wins.

== Sour Sitrus Society ==
The Sour Sitrus Society serves as the pep band of Syracuse University. While the marching band plays at football games, the pep band is a fixture at basketball events and travels with the men's basketball team during the March Madness. Named so for the "sour" notes the band played during its first season in 1971, the pep band was initially mentored by basketball coach Jim Boeheim. As of 2021, the band had 120 members and plays at the basketball games as well as some non-athletic events.

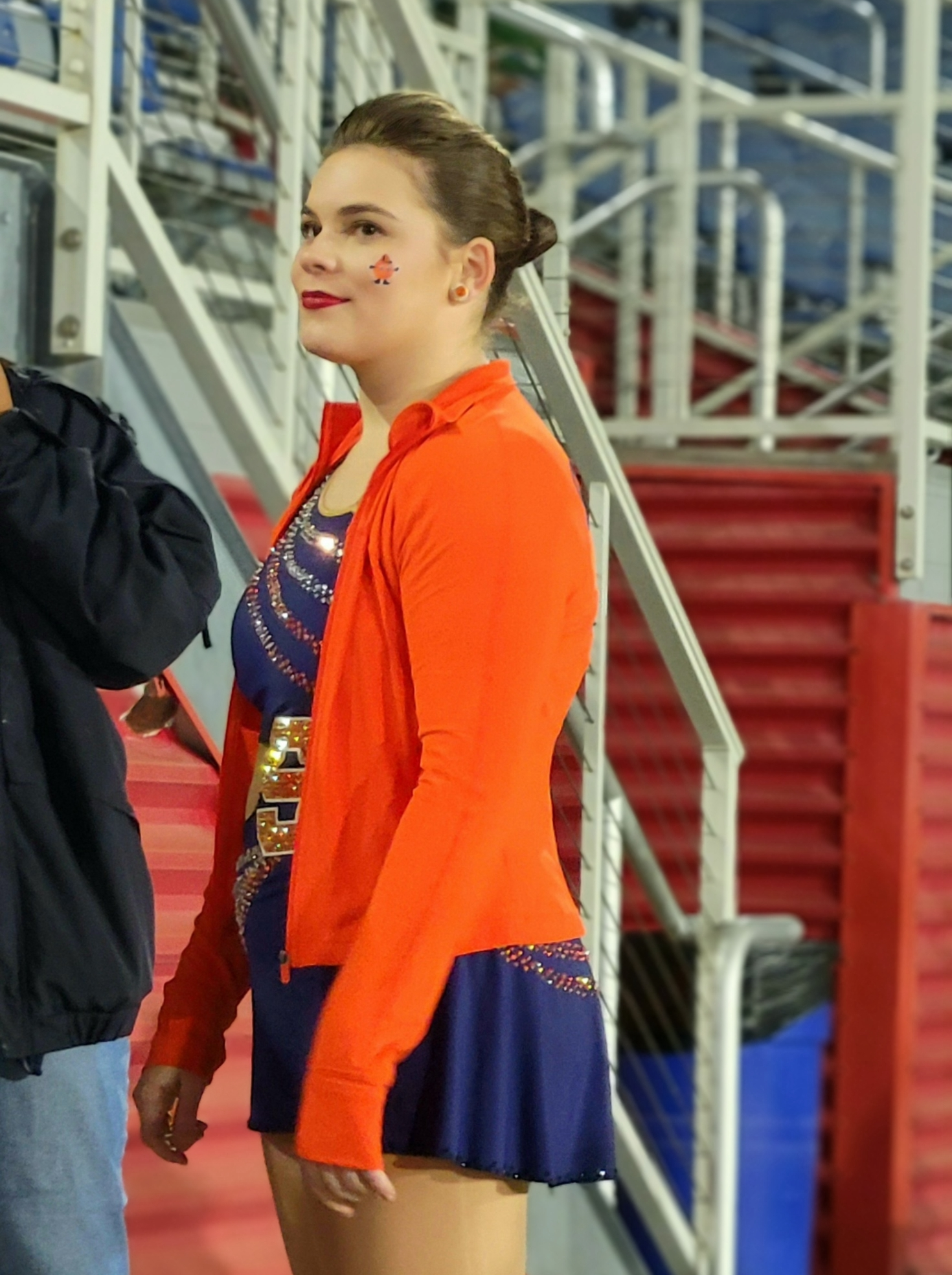
26th Orange Girl Abigail Veccia at 2023 Boca Raton Bowl.

== List of Orange Girls ==
1. Jessie Ann Harp (1947)
2. Dorothie "Dottie" Grover (1949–1953)
3. Alta Burg (1953–1957)
4. Janet Kay Smith (1957–1961)
5. Judy Delp (1962–1965) (first to be designated Orange Girl in 1962)
6. Gail Fuchs (1965)
7. Colleen Daiute (1966)
8. Candy Franck

- Melaine Cancellari Rottkamp (1991)
- Beth Forader (1994)
- Keri Ann Lynch (–2004)
- Melissa Gaffney Derr (2004–2009)
- Ashley Andrews (2011–2012)

23. Meghan Sinisi (2013–2017)
24. Isabella Bolduc (2018–2019)
25. Trina Catterson (2020–2022)
26. Abigail Veccia (2023–)
