= Down the Field =

College fight song

"Down the Field" is the title of two fight songs in college football, one used by Yale University and the other by Syracuse University. The song is also used by the Franklin & Marshall College Diplomats. The Nevada Wolf Pack's fight song is to the tune of "Down the Field."

== Yale ==
Yale’s "Down the Field" was written in 1904 by Yale undergraduate Stanleigh P. Friedman, the manager of Yale’s orchestra; with lyrics by Yale law student Caleb W. O’Connor. According to Yale Bands, the song is "played at the end of every Yale athletic event, win or lose."

== Syracuse ==
"Down the Field" is also the title of an entirely different fight song: that of Syracuse University, in Syracuse, New York. The words were written by Ralph Murphy, Class of 1916; the music was composed by C. Harold Lewis, Class of 1915. It was first performed by the Syracuse University Marching Band on November 14, 1913. The band played the song the following day during the Syracuse Orangemen football game against the Colgate team, which Syracuse lost 35-13.

== Tennessee ==
The Yale fight song was adapted with new lyrics by Robert Clayton "Red" Matthews, an engineering professor at the University of Tennessee in Knoxville, Tennessee. Matthews’ version became the official fight song of the university. However, "Rocky Top" is frequently played at the university, making it the unofficial fight song, and is a favorite among fans. When the Volunteers score a touchdown, "Down the Field" is played first, followed by "Rocky Top".

== See also ==
- Boola Boola
- Hail! Hail! Nevonia
