= C.W. O'Connor =

American songwriter (1879–1956)

Caleb-Wilson O'Connor
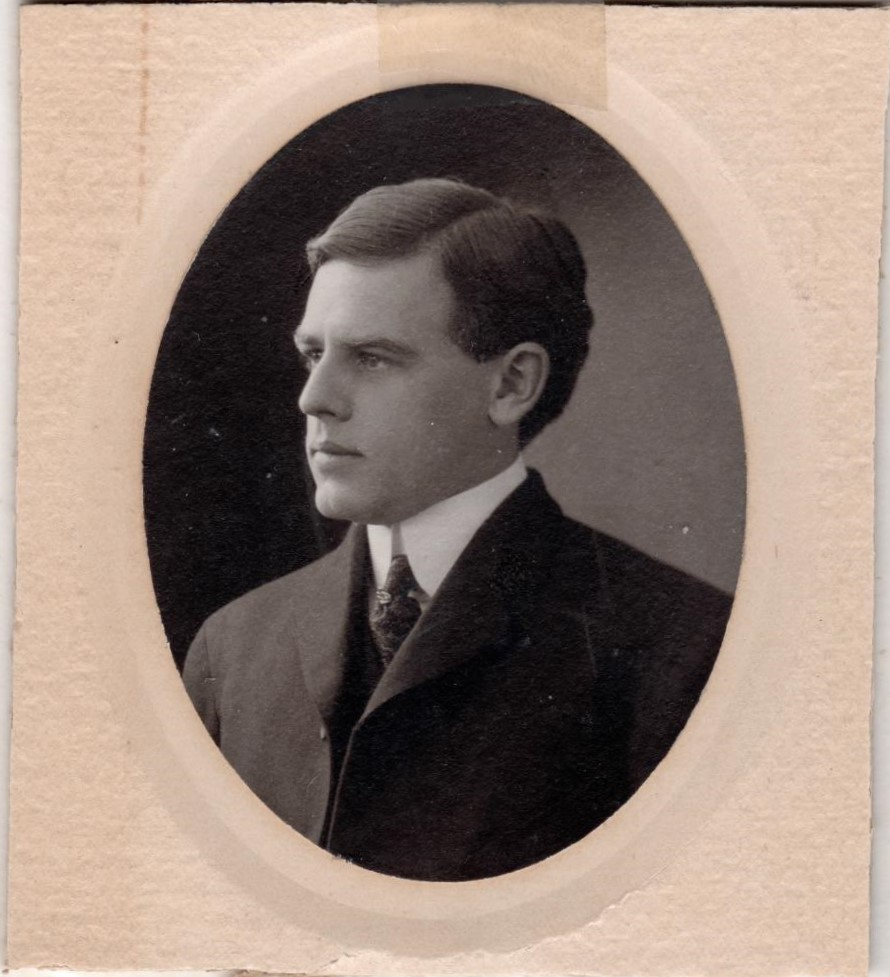
- Portrait of composer C.W. O'Connor, taken 1903
- Born: 3 October 1879
- Died: 3 April 1956 (aged 76)
- Occupations: Composer, playwright and teacher
- Parent(s): Daniel Justus O'Connor and Caroline R Wilbank

Caleb-Wilson O'Connor (1879-1956) was an early-20th-century composer of popular American music. He composed more than 200 pieces of popular music, from the Ragtime era until his death. O'Connor was also a playwright in and around Washington, D.C., and Philadelphia, Pennsylvania. He was predominantly a speech expression teacher in Washington, and was employed by NBC as a vice president. He was a founder of the O'Connor Speech Institute, Studio Hall of Washington, the Arts Club of Washington, and the Lions Club of Washington.

== Early life ==
Caleb O'Connor was born on October 3, 1879, in Philadelphia to Daniel Justus O'Connor and Caroline R. Wilbank. Little is known about his upbringing. His father was not present in his childhood. His grandfather was born in Killarney, County Kerry, which later inspired an Irish ballad he wrote.

O'Connor was raised by his mother and stepfather Samuel B. Diehl, a former Judge Advocate General of the U.S. Navy and captain of the USS Idaho.

== Education ==
According to Western Maryland College archives, "He arrived on "the Hill" as a 10-year-old prep-school pupil in 1890, one of only two out-of-towners in his class". He attended a preparatory school in Ithaca, New York, in 1899, possibly Ithaca College. By the age of 20, O'Connor was a full-time student at Western Maryland College (now McDaniel College). By his own accounts, he had a strong connection to this place, and wrote the school's Alma Mater. (In 1920, O'Connor would receive awarded an honorary master of arts degree from Western Maryland College.)

O'Connor subsequently studied law at Yale Law School, and was in the class of 1904. He gained experience in public speaking; in May 1903, he spoke at the Yale Southern Club, where the following year, he would co-write the Yale fight song "Down the Field".

== Career ==
Caleb-Wilson O'Connor's start in composing is not definite, however, it is safe to assume that he wrote and published his first piece in 1903. His manuscript for this is titled African Dreamland Lullaby, influenced by early Negro spirituals, but was published under the title, African Dreamland: Intermezzo. The music authorship in published versions is attributed to George Atwater, another local composer and bandleader from New Haven, Connecticut.

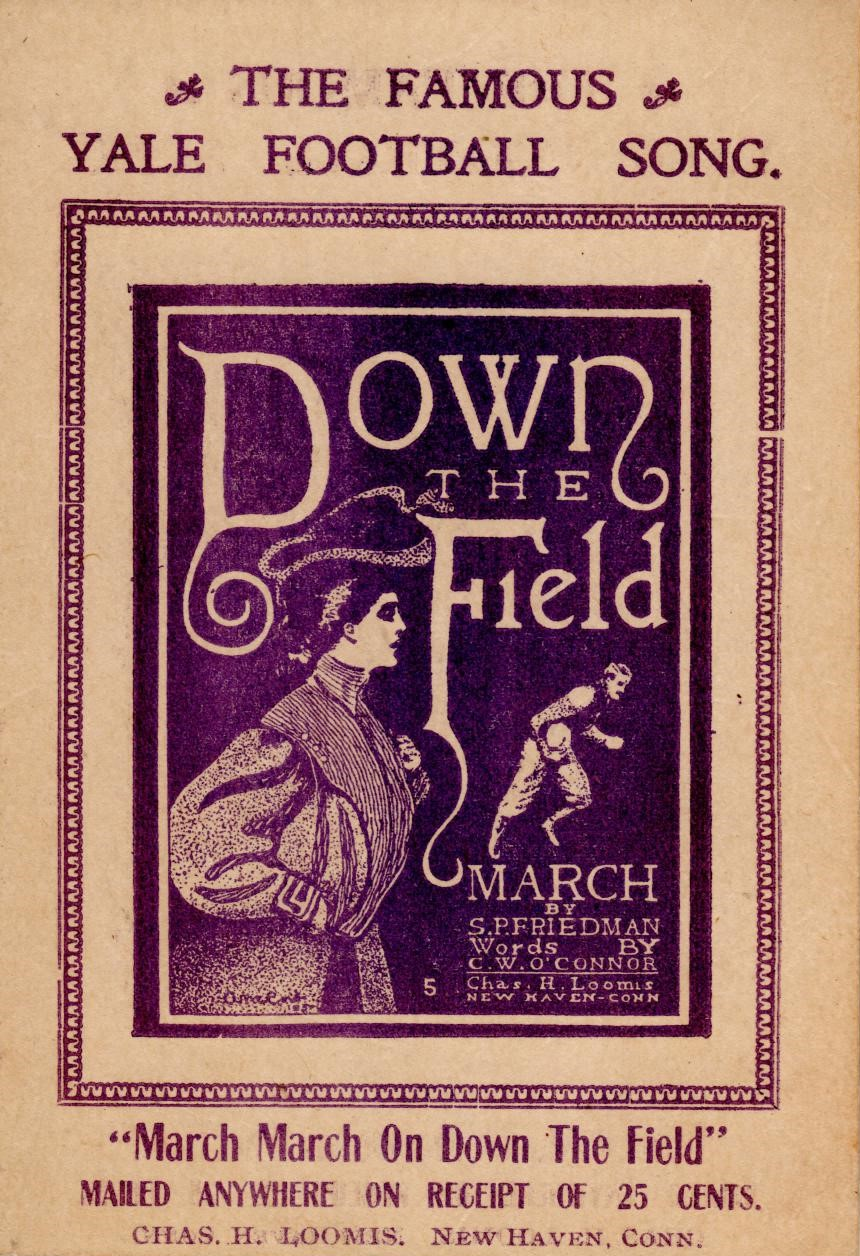
Advertisement for the Yale fight song, "Down the Field"

1922 recording of the Shannon Quartet singing the chorus of "Down the Field"

The following year was Caleb's biggest and most renown success, "Down the Field", with music written by his roommate at Yale, Stanleigh Friedman. Caleb wrote the lyrics to the song which became a popular fight song within the Yale football team and at other Universities nationwide. The song was originally published in New Haven for piano and voice. This edition is also where Caleb adopted the title of C.W. O'Connor. One of the earliest recordings of "Down the Field" was made in 1909 by the Edison Military Band. In the late 1920s, it was recorded by Rudy Vallee & His Connecticut Yankees, becoming a signature tune for the band that was also featured in early Vitaphone shorts, such as 1931's Free and Easy starring Charlie McCarthy. Many years later at an alumni day in 1955, Caleb made it known that the final words to the fight song, "Harvard's team may fight to the end, but YALE will WIN!" were written by his former wife, Agnes-Longfellow Smith.

Caleb went on to publish numerous college songs including "Cheer Pennsylvania" for the University of Pennsylvania in 1906, and "Dear Western Maryland" for Western Maryland College following his marriage to Agnes-Longfellow Smith in 1909. According to the composer, the story goes as such, "'Dear Western Maryland' I wrote on the back of an envelope, on a train, on the way to Westminster, with my bride. And when I got to college, then we figured out how the tune should go. At first I could not play it on the piano, but my sweet girl could." Music publisher E.F. Droop & Sons, whom Caleb worked with in Washington, D.C., gave him the title of "College March King". An anonymous author wrote the following about Caleb and his songwriting experience: "The writer of these marches has been called, by Victor Herbert and others, "The College March King" because he has written more marches for more colleges than any writer and composer in the country. DOWN THE FIELD (Yale), WIN WESTERN MARYLAND, CHEER PENSYLVANNIA, ARMY, ARMY, BAM, BAM! (Univ. of Alabama), DEAR WESTERN MARYLAND, LOU, LOU! (L.S.U.), MARYLAND, MARYLAND!, YALE FOREVER!" O'Connor also wrote one known rag titled the "Capital City Rag" in 1905, most likely referencing his hometown of Washington, D.C. It was originally written by O'Connor for the U.S. Marine Band.

Caleb was active in the theatre business as well. In 1910, he was residing at the Hotel Normandie in Philadelphia. This was a few blocks from the residence of Donald Gordon, a playwright and composer of vaudeville at the former National Theatre of Philadelphia, which opened in 1876 as a theatre, and closed in 1917. There is some confusion in identifying the two figures, as Caleb-Wilson O'Connor owned many copies of Donald Gordon's music, which show different authorship between published and professional copies. By 1913, Caleb could be found residing at the same address as Donald Gordon. A song published in 1914 in Philadelphia names solely Donald Gordon as the composer, but that fails to explain why Caleb had numerous copies of this song in his possession. Perhaps they were rivals, seeking to have their names published first. Or, was 'Donald Gordon' a pseudonym that Caleb was using at the time, like many composers of that era.

The first known play attributed to Caleb was written in 1911, with a song of the same name titled, "Bran' New", which was played at the Lyric Theatre of Philadelphia. According to Caleb's notes, a copy of this song was given to Broadway vocalist Marie Cahill.

By 1916, Caleb was residing in Washington, D.C., and was a key figure in the creation of Studio Hall, a performance venue that sought to promote local artists from Washington. Caleb was a teacher and leader at this institution, and worked with up-and-coming singers, and helped promote established artists in concert such as the operatic soprano Mary Helen Howe. The periodical Musical America wrote about Caleb's directorship of the institution in October 1916 saying "A new manager has established himself in Washington in the person of C.W. O'Connor, who as the director of Studio Hall, will give several musicals during the season. Mr. O'Connor will confine his efforts chiefly to local talent and in this way give Washington an opportunity of hearing its own as well as creating a local pride in its own achievements. Mr. O'Connor plans to give a weekly series of artists' concerts and a weekly student-artist series. There will also be periodical Sunday musical teas, at which musicians will mingle in relaxation. Mr. O'Connor has had a stage career for the last seven years which embraces the fields of actor, producer and manager. He is the author of several successful musical vaudeville sketches and is the composer of several marches and songs. At Studio Hall he has surrounded himself with musicians from the "younger set," who will assist him in his undertakings. Among these are Ethel Nobel Johnson, soprano; Alwarda Casselman, pianist; May Eleanor Smith, lecturer on theory and history of music, and Charlotte Louise Hogan, interpretative and classical dancer. Gertrude Lyons has stepped into the managerial field with the organization of the Cecilia Concert Company. The society is equipped to give individual recitals, concerts by several artists, entertainments and musicals for fraternities, clubs, lodges and such organizations. Lyons has gathered around her a company of about thirty, including singers, instrumentalists, readers and dancers. The Cecilia Concert Company promises to fill a need in Washington as well as in some of the near-by cities in which the manager has already made connections. Miss Lyons herself is a lyric soprano who will appear during the coming season with Clarence Eddy, the organist, in a Southern tour, as well as with several local organizations."

Following World War I, Caleb had re-married, and his musical activities were varied and less frequent, but still present. Caleb and his second wife were involved with an organization known as the Arts Club of Washington, of which he was a founding member. He became a director of their theater group, The Arts Club Players, in their 1919-20 season. This group would put on performances in the Washington, D.C., area, and later exclusively for the Arts Club. It was also at this time that Caleb became involved in early radio, and introduced the first radio show to the Washington, D.C., area in 1922, at WJH. He conducted his shows with a combination of speech expression instruction, and introducing songs that he had written, on the air. He also worked at the WCAP and WMAL stations, which at the latter he featured a show called Brand News as Bill Brand. Caleb was employed at NBC in the 1930s as vice president of radio announcers and would test new artists' voices for radio. He gave his son the test, who was a big band musician and arranger, upon a visit to the recording studio in 1932, without success.

In 1938, Caleb wrote a follow-up composition to those he had written for Western Maryland College, titled "Win! Western Maryland". His partialness to the college was confirmed in a 1953 newsletter in which he stated "I still would rather lead a Western Maryland gang singing 'Win Western Maryland' than to head a mob singing 'Down the Field,' to a 50-piece band."

By the 1940s, Caleb had founded his own school of speech expression, called the O'Connor Speech Institute, in Washington. He was a theatre producer as late as 1942, when he was employed at the Penny Playhouse, also in Washington. He had a program called The Capital Round Table at WWDC also during this time.

== Volunteer work ==
Caleb-Wilson O'Connor was an active volunteer in Washington, D.C., giving frequent soldier benefit shows during World War I as Captain of Company A on the Commission on Training Camp Activities with the War Service Commission and serving on the committee on entertainment of soldiers and sailors for the District of Columbia. He was also President of the Lions Club of Washington in 1922, speaking at its inauguration, member of the Yale Club of Washington, and a frequent donor to Western Maryland College, and member of its Washington D.C. chapter into the 1950s.

== Death and legacy ==
Caleb-Wilson O'Connor died on April 3, 1956 in Washington. An inscription commemorating the place where "Down the Field" was written can be found at the entrance of the Old South Middle building at Yale, where Caleb O'Connor and Stanleigh Friedman were roommates. O'Connor is named in a history of McDaniel College from 2007 titled Fearless and Bold by Dr. James Lightner.

== Compositions (partial list) ==
- African Dreamland Lullaby (1903)
- Down the Field (1904)
- Eyes of Killarney Blue (1905)
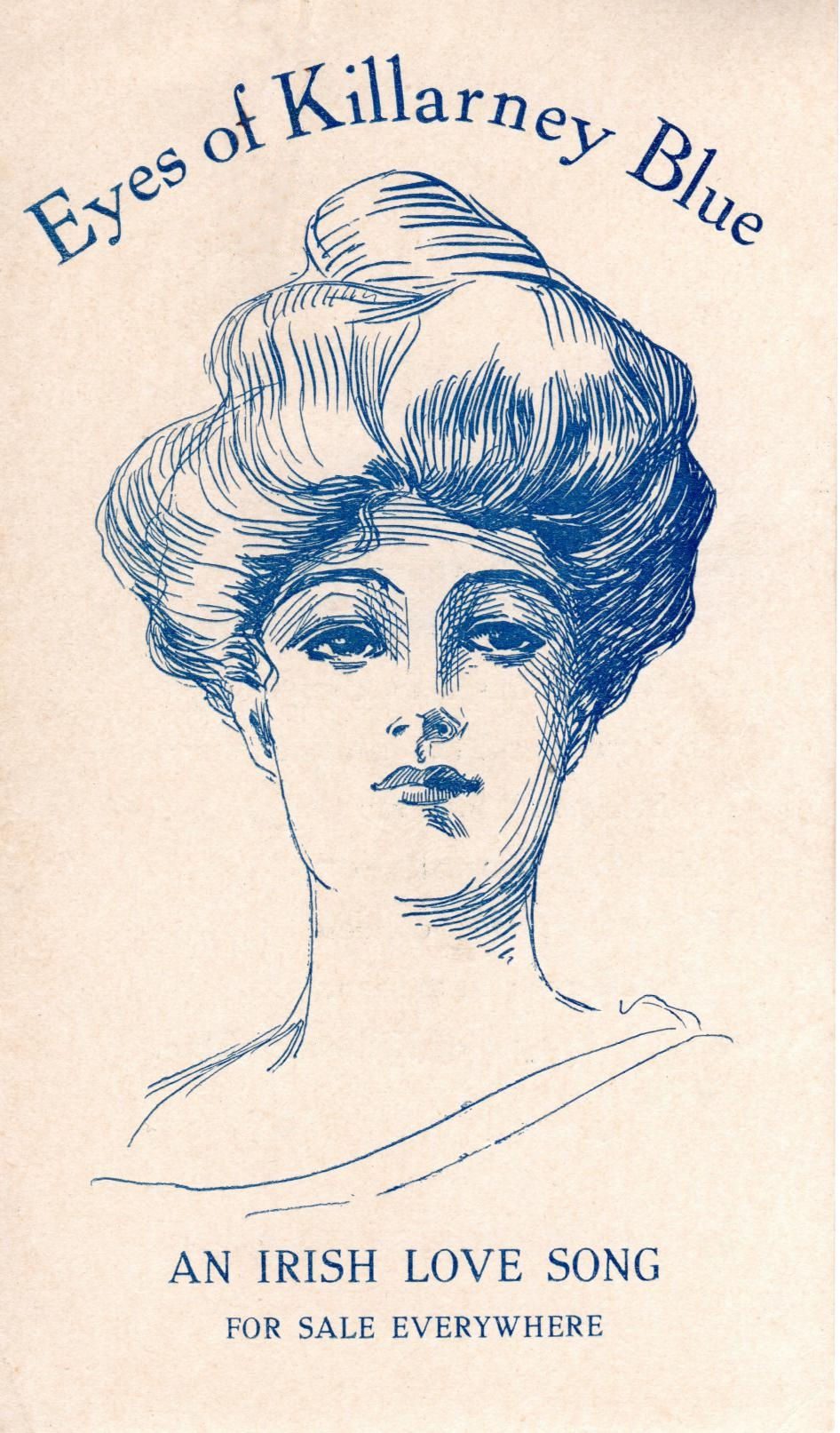
  Advertisement for C.W. O'Connor's Irish ballad, "Eyes of Killarney Blue"
- Capital City Rag (1905)
- Cheer Pennsylvania (1906)
- Camp Fadette (1906), dedicated to Caroline B. Nichols of the Fadette Ladies' Orchestra
- Let me be your Last Love (1906)
- Down Among the Sugar Cane (c.1909), different from Avery & Hart version
- Idaho March (1909), dedicated to the U.S.S. Idaho
- Dear Western Maryland
- Yale Forever (1911)
- Bran' New (1911)
- Meet me on the Boardwalk Dearie (1914)

== Plays/theatre productions ==
- Bran' New (1911), unknown production name
- The Eternal Silence (1919)
- The Law (1919)
- Plain Mary Brown (1919)
- Silk Stockings (1919)
- The Child of Belgium (1919)
- The Little Girl Who Was Afraid (1919)
- Alice Goes West (1920)
- Roas (1920), a detective drama
- A Turkish Trophy (1920)
- He Cometh (1920)
- Disillusioned (1920)
- Rosa (c.1927)
- Onions (1928)
- He Who Hesitates (1929)
