= George Atwater House =

Historic house in Connecticut, United States

- U.S. National Register of Historic Places
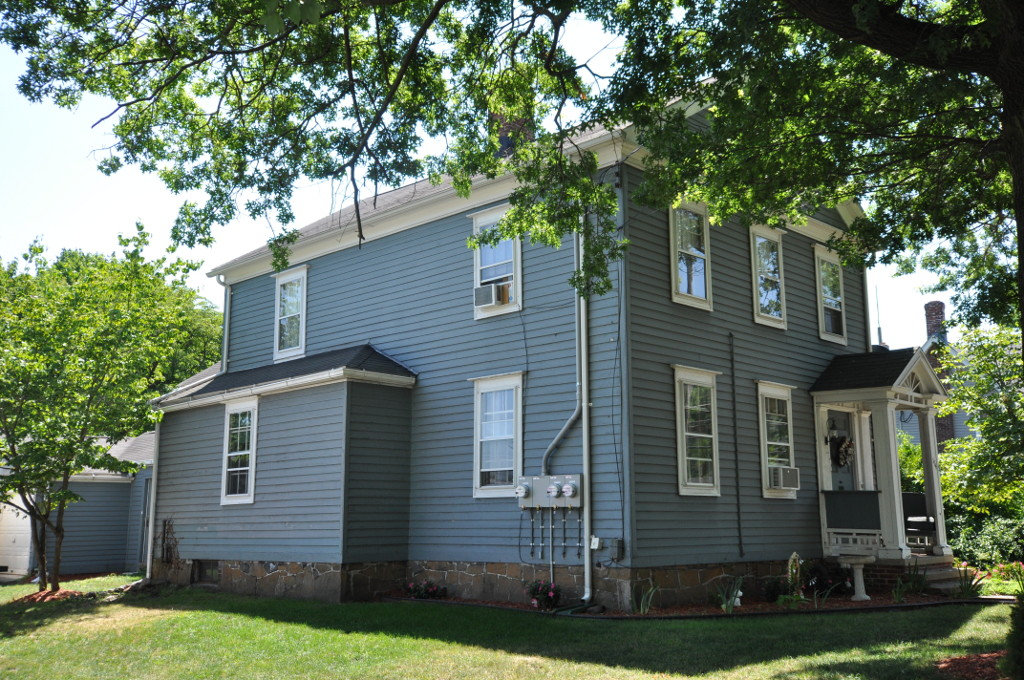

- Location within Connecticut Location within the United States
- Location: 1845 State Street, Hamden, Connecticut
- Coordinates: 41°19′57″N 72°54′01″W
- Area: 0.4 acres (0.16 ha)
- Built: 1820
- Architectural style: Federal
- NRHP reference No.: 91001921
- Added to NRHP: January 17, 1992

The George Atwater House is a historic house at 1845 State Street in Hamden, Connecticut. Built about 1820, it is a good local example of a vernacular Federal period farmhouse, with a well-preserved interior and unusual floorplan. It was listed on the National Register of Historic Places in 1992.

== Description and history ==
The George Atwater House is located in southeastern Hamden, on the east side of State Street (United States Route 5) near its junction with Hyde Street. It is a 2 1/2-story wood-frame structure, with a gabled roof and clapboarded exterior. Unusual for the Federal period, its roof ridge is oriented perpendicular to the road, with the main entrance facing the street in the rightmost of three bays. The main roof gable is fully pedimented, with a half-round window at its center. The entrance is sheltered by an early 20th-century gabled portico supported by square posts, with a half-round transom-like pattern in its gable that stylistically echoes the window in the main gable. Windows are set in retangular openings, with projecting cornices above. The interior retains many period finishes, including a particularly fine carved fireplace surround in the main parlor. The interior layout is unusual because of the presence of an original single-story ell projecting to the north, where the kitchen was originally placed. A mid-19th century gabled ell also extends to the south at an offset.

The Atwater family had owned land in this area since the early years of the New Haven Colony in the 17th century, with early settler David Atwater owning hundreds of acres here. George Atwater, one of his descendants, built this house about 1820. After dying childless, the house and land passed to his nephews, and remained within that family until 1933.

== See also ==
- National Register of Historic Places listings in New Haven County, Connecticut
- George Atwater (1866–1931), composer and arranger
