= Amicus usque ad aras =

Latin phrase

Amicus usque ad aras is a Latin phrase usually translated into English as "a friend as far as to the altar", "a life-long partner" or "a friend to the very end".

The plural of amicus is amici leading to a separate usage of amici usque ad aras.

A song of the same name dates to the defunct Yale University Greek organization Phi Theta Psi in 1864. The tune used comes from the traditional song "Annie Lisle".

Phi Kappa Psi fraternity's song "Amici" includes the phrase "amici usque ad aras" and appears to be based on the Yale tune.

The phrase also appears in the fraternity of Alpha Chi Rho's song "Amici" and the anthem song of 'Le Bourdon' of the 'Deltsch Studenten Corps' "Our Strong Bands".

== In popular culture ==
This phrase has also been used by two members of the K-pop group ATEEZ. Choi San and Jung Woo-young use this phrase to show the special relationship that they have. Both of them like to describe each other as 'soulmates', 'alter ego' and each others' half of the other. They also have a matching tattoo with this phrase on their right thigh which was initially done in secrecy until they revealed about it to the public.
