= Annie Lisle =

Song

"Annie Lisle" is an 1857 ballad by Boston songwriter H. S. Thompson, which was first published by Moulton & Clark of Newburyport, Massachusetts, and later by Oliver Ditson & Co. It is about the death of a young maiden, by what some have speculated to be tuberculosis, though the lyrics do not mention tuberculosis (or "consumption", as it was called then). The song might have slipped into obscurity had the tune not been adopted by countless colleges, universities, and high schools worldwide as the tune for their alma mater songs.

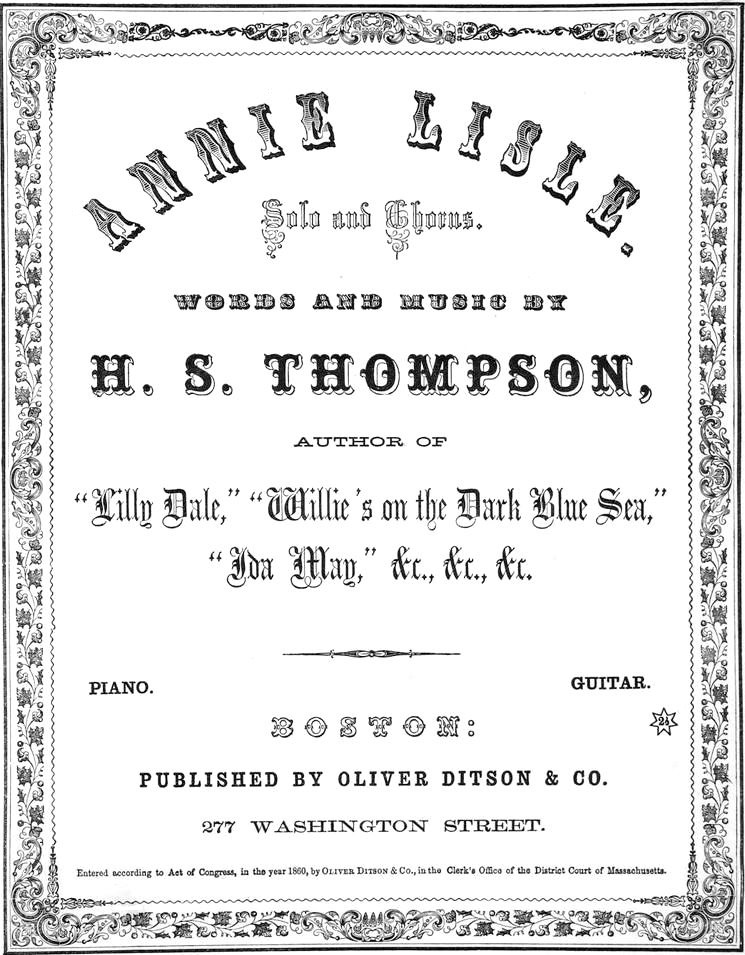

== Lyrics ==
Down where the waving willows
'Neath the sunbeams smile,
Shadow'd o'er the murm'ring waters
Dwelt sweet Annie Lisle;
Pure as the forest lily,
Never tho't of guile
Had its home within the bosom
Of sweet Annie Lisle.

Chorus:
Wave willows, murmur waters,
Golden sunbeams, smile!
Earthly music cannot waken
Lovely Annie Lisle.

Sweet came the hallow'd chiming
Of the Sabbath bell,
Borne on the morning breezes
Down the woody dell.
On a bed of pain and anguish
Lay dear Annie Lisle,
Chang'd were the lovely features,
Gone the happy smile.

Chorus

"Raise me in your arms, O Mother;
Let me once more look
On the green and waving willows
And the flowing brook.
Hark! the sound of angel music
From the choirs above!
Dearest mother, I am going;
Truly God is love."

Chorus

== In popular culture ==
- The tune is used by the alma mater songs at many high schools and universities. Cornell University is believed to be the first school to have used it. Other universities that do, many with similar lyrics, include The University of Akron, University of Alabama, East Texas A&M University, University of Georgia, Howard Payne University, Indiana University, Indiana State University, University of Kansas, Lehigh University, University of Missouri, University of North Carolina at Chapel Hill, Southern Nazarene University, Syracuse University, Swarthmore College, Vanderbilt University, Western Carolina University, College of William & Mary, University of Wisconsin–La Crosse, Worcester State University, American University of Beirut, and The Barstow School.
- The tune is used as the alma mater song of the Methodist Girls' School Ipoh in Perak, Malaysia.
- The tune is used as the alma mater song of the Annie Wright Seminary (now Annie Wright Schools) in Tacoma, Washington.
- The tune is used as the alma mater song of the Gardner Edgerton High School in Gardner, Kansas.
- The tune is used as the alma mater song of three affiliated Malaysian schools, Chung Ling High School, Chung Ling Private High School, and Chung Ling Butterworth High School.
- The tune is used as the alma mater song of Hwa Chong Institution in Singapore.
- The tune played as the alma mater of Springfield College on the TV show Father Knows Best, season 6, episode 8, "Margaret's Old Flame".
- The tune is used in the parting song for the Kellerman Resort in the 1987 film Dirty Dancing, as well as the tune sung by the Purdue University students in the 1953 film Titanic.
- The tune is played over the opening credits of the 1942 Merrie Melodies cartoon The Dover Boys at Pimento University.
- The tune was featured in Hey Arnold! as the school song of PS-118
- The tune was used for the Civil War battle song "Ellsworth's Avengers" (words by A. Lora Hudson, musical adaptation by S. L. Coe), paying tribute to Colonel Elmer Ellsworth, the first U.S. Army officer killed in the conflict. An innkeeper shotgunned him after removing a Confederate flag from the rooftop of an Alexandria, Virginia, hotel.
- A snippet of the melody is sung, with different words and alongside many others, by the Butterfly in the animated movie The Last Unicorn.
- The tune is used at the end of the 1989 film Shag for the alma mater song of Spartanburg High School.
- The tune is used as the alma mater song of Anarene High School in the 1971 film The Last Picture Show.
- The tune is quoted in Charles Ives's song "Old Home Day" and in his "Intercollegiate March" no. 5
- The tune is used the college anthem of Chung Chi College, The Chinese University of Hong Kong. The lyrics are by Zia Nai-zin (謝扶雅), a former lecturer at the college.
