= H. S. Thompson =

American songwriter of the mid-nineteenth century

Henry S. Thompson (born 1824 or 1825) was an American songwriter of the mid-nineteenth century.

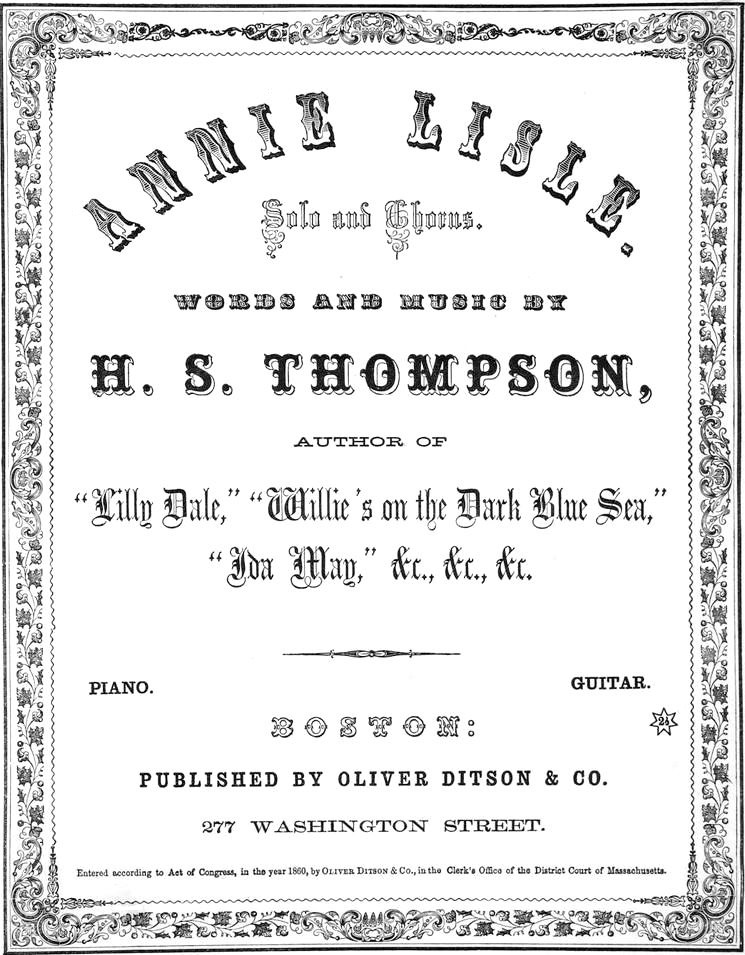

Little is known of Thompson other than his works, mainly ballads used in blackface minstrel shows; 48 works were published under the name H. S. Thompson between 1849 and 1885.

== Birth and Family ==
Based on U.S. Census records, musicologist Ralph Richey estimated that Thompson was born in 1824 or 1825 in northern Essex County, Massachusetts; however, Thompson was known to alter his information to promote himself, for example listing his birthplace as Circassia in the 1870 and 1880 Censuses, after showman P. T. Barnum had popularized the Circassian beauty stereotype. The Massachusetts Birth Records listing the birth of his daughter, Sarah Oliver Thompson in 1848 in Ipswich, indicate that his own place of birth was Manchester, New Hampshire, as do the birth records for his son, Frank Waldo Thompson in 1851, and daughter Ida May Thompson in 1853. In 1845, he had married Sarah E. Oliver in Boston.

== Career ==
Thompson began his career in an era when the American public was beginning to seek out its own melodies, rather than those from European composers, while sheet music could receive national distribution thanks to improved transportation and communications networks.

He published his first song, "Willie's on the Dark Blue Sea," a ballad sung by a woman about her lover lost at sea, with Oliver Ditson & Co. of Boston in 1849. The 1850 census records him in Georgetown, Massachusetts, but by 1851 he had moved to Newburyport where he was a teacher, performer, and impresario, first advertising his Singing School in January of 1851. By April of that year, he was offering a "Musical Entertainment," including a quartet singing his own composition, "Willie's on the dark blue sea."

He took a room in Boston in 1858, but would split from his family before the close of the American Civil War; his wife and two younger children relocated to Washington County, Minnesota, while Thompson went west. Before the spring of 1865 he joined Fred Wilson and Charles A. Morris's opera troupe, of St. Louis, and traveled with them in Missouri and Ohio (1865–66). He would also be connected with several minstrel companies, including Morris Brothers, Pell, Huntley]'s, and Morris Bros., Pell & Trowbridge's Minstrels in Boston. He formed his own concert troupe with George A. Parkhurst, which opened its first show in winter 1867 in Chicago to mixed reviews. They would go on to tour Michigan, Wisconsin, Illinois, Minnesota, and Iowa.

On June 26, 1870 he married Frances Christine Finney in Marquette, Michigan, where he had moved to teach; Finney may have been one of his students. The couple later moved to Crawfordsville, Indiana, where they had two daughters and a son. Thompson is believed to have died before 1890, but the whereabouts of his remains are unknown.

== Works ==
- 1849 "Willie's on the dark blue sea," published by Oliver Ditson & Co. Boston
- 1850 "Mother's dead and gone, or, The Dismal Glen," published by G. P. Reed, Boston
- 1852 "Lilly Dale," Thompson's biggest hit
- 1853 "Ida May," Oliver Ditson, Boston
- 1855 "Effie, maid of the mill," E. H. Wade, Boston
- 1857 "Annie Lisle," Moulton & Clark, Newburyport, and later by Oliver Ditson, Boston. Thompson's most famous work, it is remembered as the melody for the Cornell University alma mater "Far Above Cayuga's Waters" and other school anthems.
- 1861 "Wake Now the Song of Glory"
- 1861 "Row On"
- 1861 "Our Navy"
- 1861 "Kiss me goodnight, Mother"
- 1863 "My own loved home again"
- 1863 "I'm lonely since my mother died," Oliver Ditson, Boston
- 1863 "High times, good times; I'se g'wine to be a gin'ral"
- 1863 "Cousin Jedediah," Oliver Ditson, Boston
- 1863 "Down by the river liv'd a maiden," generally believed to be the basis for the 1884 "Oh My Darling, Clementine" ascribed to Percy Montrose
- 1864 "The soldier lay on the tented field"
- 1864 "He is marching now with angels"
- 1864 "Oh bury me in the sunshine"
- 1865 "A nation mourns her chief"
- 1871 "List, boys, the bell is ringing!"
- 1879 "Around the world with Grant"
- 1881 "Job Gray, and Friend Paul"
- 1881 "The martyr president sleeps"
- 1885 "The emigrant's farewell"
- A slightly altered version of the lyrics of "Lilly Dale," about a young maiden felled by disease, appear in the 1916 novel A Portrait of the Artist as a Young Man by James Joyce. Country musician Bob Wills recorded an arrangement as "Lily Dale," which itself was covered by Dolly Parton as "Billy Dale."

The tune of "Lily Dale" was paired with lyrics for "O Ye Mountains High" by Charles W. Penrose in hymnbooks of the Church of Jesus Christ of Latter-day Saints as early as 1880. It is number 34 in their current hymnbook.
