= Boola Boola =

Yale University football song

"Boola Boola" is a football song of Yale University. It has enjoyed widespread popularity over the years and has been adapted to many other uses. Despite its popularity, it is not Yale's official fight song, which is "Bull Dog", by Cole Porter.

== Origins ==
The song in its present form was composed in 1900 and is generally attributed to Allan M. Hirsh, Yale Class of 1901, who in a 1930 letter claimed to have written it in collaboration with his classmates F. M. Van Wicklen, Albert Marckwald, and James L. Boyce in the fall of 1900. Though the claim was disputed by Marckwald – who was credited with the tune in the 1901 Class Book – and others, the weight of the evidence, including several articles in the Yale Alumni Weekly from 1900 and 1901, supports Hirsh's claim.

However, the song appears to be based on an earlier one, "La Hoola Boola" (1898), by Bob Cole and Billy Johnson, "extremely popular African American singer-songwriters of the time." When the first piano edition of "Yale Boola" appeared in 1901, it included a notice "Adapted by permission of Howley, Haviland & Dresser", the successor publisher of "La Hoola Boola". Hirsh himself said in his 1930 letter:

The song was not altogether original with us, but was undoubtedly adapted from some other song but we were unable to definitively designate this song, although later on we did discover that there had been published a song, which at that time was out of print, called 'La Hula Boola,' and the air was quite similar but the time was different.

The song immediately caught on, soon being played by John Philip Sousa. It sold more sheet music in the first half of 1901 than any other song in the country, and became indelibly associated with Yale athletics.

== Recordings and adaptations ==
Arthur Pryor's Band recorded "Boola Boola" in 1910.

As one of Yale's most traditional football songs, "Boola Boola" has historically been performed by the Yale Whiffenpoofs and the Yale Glee Club.

The tune of "Boola Boola" is used for the University of Oklahoma's fight song, "Boomer Sooner."

== Lyrics ==
Boola boola, boola boola, boola boola, boola, boola
Oh when we're through with those poor fellows
They will holler boola, boo
Rah, rah!

Oh Yale, Eli Yale
Oh Yale, Eli Yale
Oh Yale, Eli Yale
Oh Yale, Eli Yale

== In popular culture ==
An accordion rendition is featured in the 1954 film Phffft, when Kim Novak's character leads patrons in a restaurant in singing the song, while she waves pom poms. In the film “Sabrina,” also released in 1954, Humphrey Bogart’s character briefly sings the tune while putting on a jacket from Yale, his alma mater.

A brass-band arrangement of the "Boola Boola" tune accompanies the sequence in Peter Yates' 1969 film John and Mary in which Mary (Mia Farrow) imagines herself sitting on a bench wrapped in a blanket, watching John (Dustin Hoffman) play tennis with James (Michael Tolan) on a New York City court in the winter, both wearing Yale jerseys. Then John and James briefly sing the song in the shower while throwing wet towels onto Mary.

Nancy Kelly sings a version of the song in 1943's Tarzan’s Desert Mystery as a diversion to the villains looking for Tarzan and his son Boy.

Dick Tracy comic strips from October 13, 1956-December 23, 1956, featured a counterfeiter named Ivy who would frequently utter “Boola Boola Boola”. He wore tweed suits, owned a large riding stable, and was a former polo champion.

In the Simpsons episode "The Great Wife Hope", character Mr. Burns, an alumnus of Yale, is seen playing the song as he comes up against Marge in a practice wrestling match.
