= Traditions of Texas A&M University =

Aspect of Texas A&M University culture

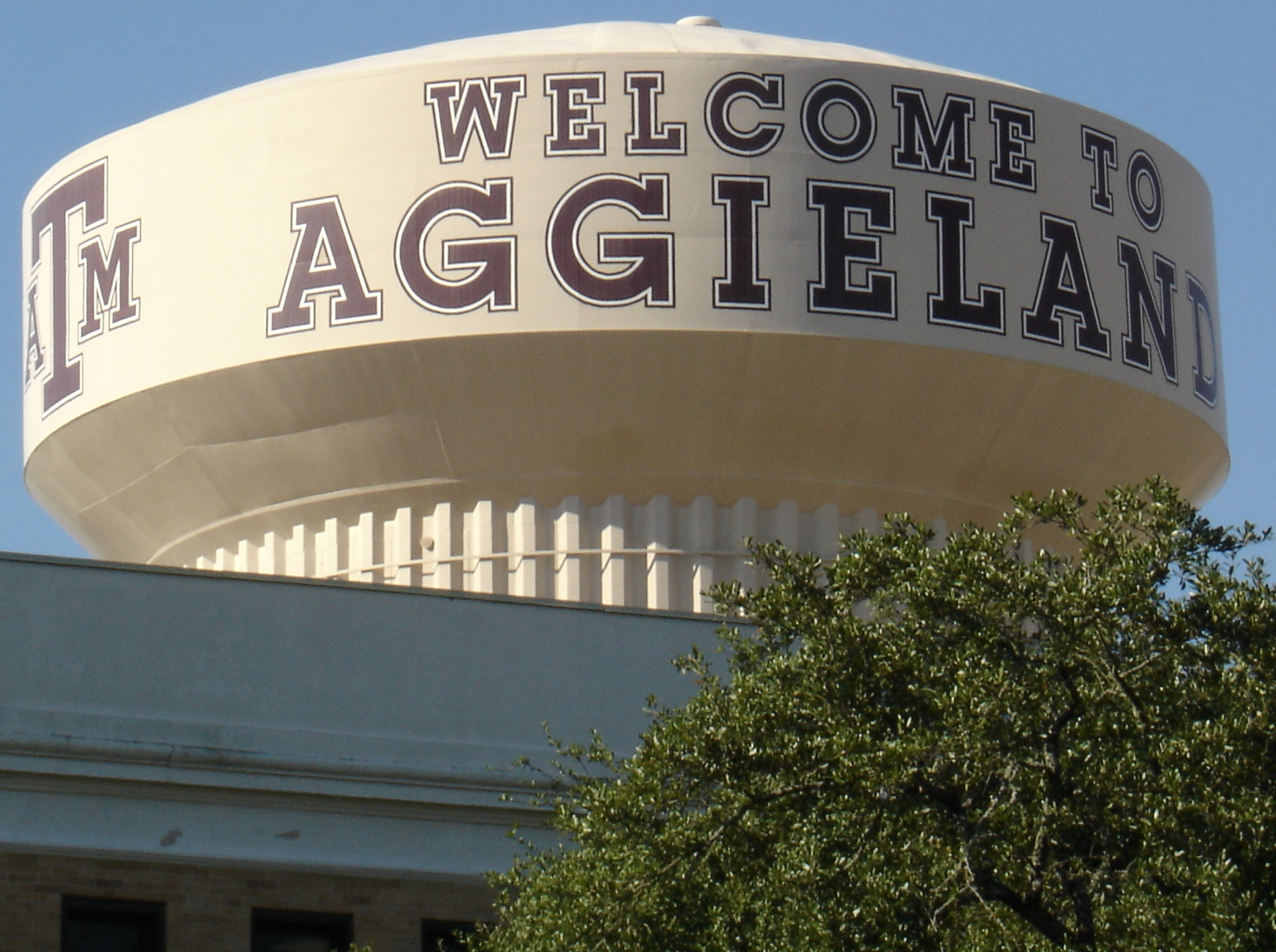
Texas A&M University Aggieland water tower

The traditions of Texas A&M University are a key aspect of the culture of Texas A&M University. Some of the school traditions date to the 1890s, shortly after the opening of the school, while others have been introduced more recently. These traditions encourage current students and alumni (Aggies) to cultivate the Aggie Spirit, a sense of loyalty and respect for the school, and dictate many aspects of student life, including how to greet others, how to act at an A&M sporting event, and what words a student may use in conversation. The most visible tradition among senior class students and alumni (more commonly referred to as "former students") is the wearing of the Aggie Ring, whose design has been relatively unchanged since its introduction in 1894. Not all Aggie traditions are recognized by the university, and some, like Bonfire, have been discontinued for safety reasons. Texas Monthly states that the students' respect for school traditions and values is the university's greatest strength.

Incoming students are generally first exposed to traditions when they are greeted with the official Texas A&M greeting "Howdy". Since the 1950s, incoming students have been offered orientations, led by current students, which teach the various traditions, songs, and yells in current use. On campus, the Texas A&M University Corps of Cadets is known as the "Keepers of the Spirit" for its staunch defense of Aggie traditions. A subset of the Corps, the Fightin' Texas Aggie Band, is the official marching band of the university.

Many school traditions revolve around sporting events, especially football. Before games, university yell leaders host yell practice, similar to other schools' pep rallies. Instead of cheers, students learn yells. Since 1922, students, known as the 12th Man, stand throughout football games, symbolizing their willingness to step in and assist the team. The official mascot, a dog named Reveille, is present at most official university activities, including sporting events.

== Aggie Spirit ==
Current students and alumni at Texas A&M University, nicknamed Aggies after the school's agricultural roots, are known for their loyalty and respect for their alma mater. They cultivate "the Aggie Spirit" through "an almost religious devotion to the traditions" of the school, some over 100 years old. As Texas Monthly noted, "Every Aggie is a self-appointed guardian of the Aggie spirit, eternally on the alert for signs of slippage." To Aggies, Texas A&M is "not just a university but a...family,...defined and united by a unique culture." The school song is titled The Spirit of Aggieland, and proclaims in its first verse that the "spirit can ne'er be told."

The Texas A&M culture is a product of the university's founding as a rural military and agricultural school. Although the school and surrounding community have grown, and military training is no longer required, the school's history has instilled in students "the idealized elements of a small-town life: community, tradition, loyalty, optimism, and unabashed sentimentality."

Many of these traditions are part of what Aggies call "The Other Education", activities designed to make students well-rounded and "moral, ethical people." Students who attend Texas A&M feel "that they receive 'more' from Texas A&M than just the knowledge one acquires from the formal classroom and books." Freshmen are introduced to these traditions and to the Aggie spirit at Fish Camp, a three-day extended orientation retreat held during the summer. Current students organize and run Fish Camp, leading sessions on the Aggie Spirit, school yells, and other school traditions so that new students can "begin the process of feeling part of the extended Aggie family." Fish Camp began in 1954 as a simple camping trip involving several new students and Gordon Gay, a former Student Activities director. The program has since evolved to accommodate approximately 70% of incoming freshmen; over 5,600 Texas A&M students attended in 2008. The program has been emulated by several schools, including Virginia Tech. In 1987, Texas A&M established a parallel orientation for summer and fall transfer students called Transfer Camp, or T-Camp. Howdy Camp also serves as a campus orientation program. Modeled after T-Camp and Fish Camp, it is intended for freshman and transfer students who enter A&M in the spring semester. Students who choose not to participate in The Other Education are known on campus as "2 Percenters," because going to class is only a small portion of experiencing Texas A&M.

=== Howdy ===
Many incoming students at Texas A&M choose to attend the campus because they feel that the students are friendlier than those at other universities. This perception is created partly by the Aggie tradition "Howdy", the official greeting of Texas A&M University. Students are encouraged to greet everyone they pass on campus with a smile and a howdy. Howdy is the preferred method for a speaker to get a large group's attention, as the members of the group are expected to return the "Howdy" back to the speaker.

=== Gig 'em ===
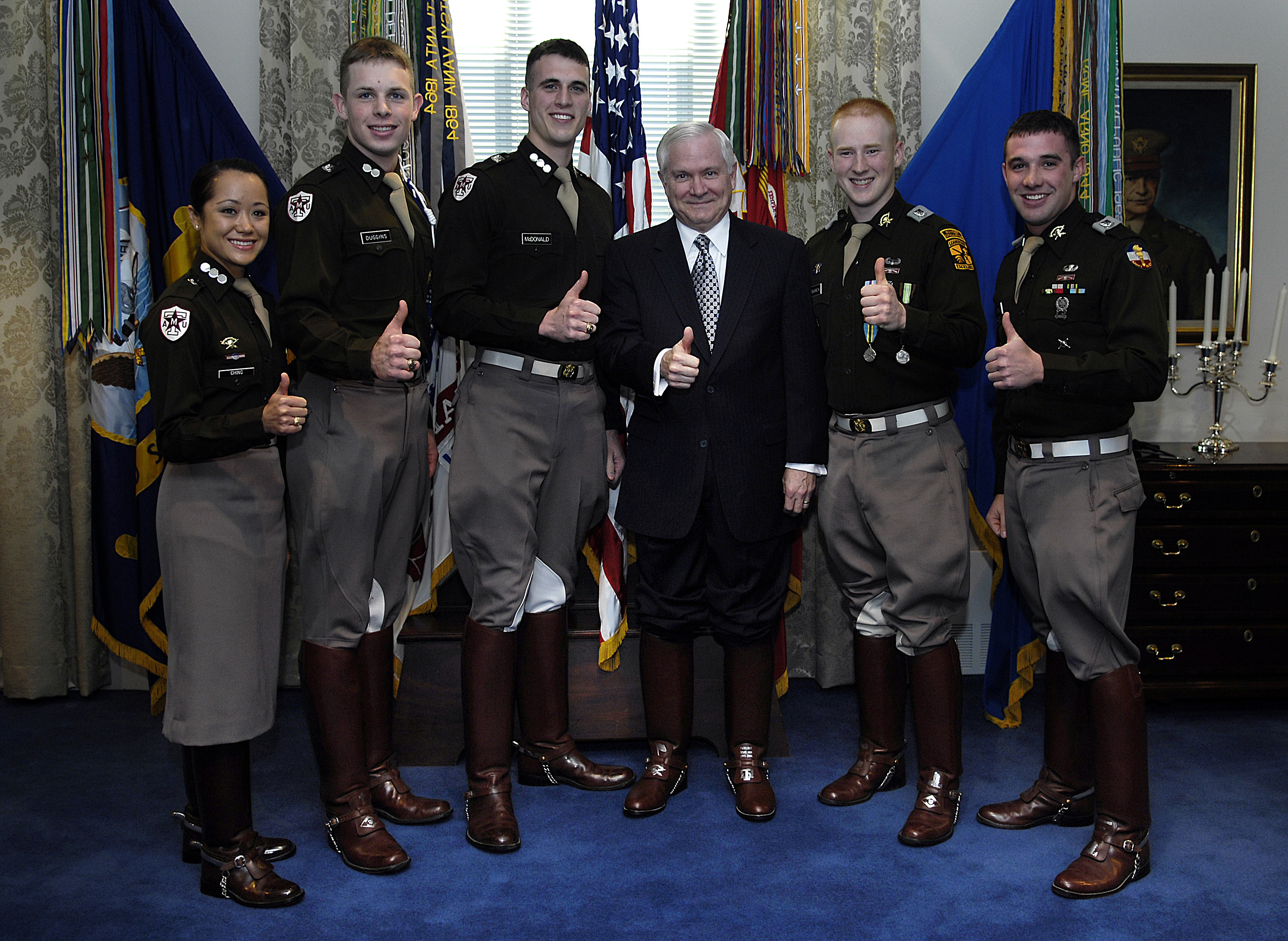
US Secretary of Defense Robert Gates along with senior cadets from the Corps of Cadets give the "gig 'em" sign at the Pentagon

Aggies today will often end public addresses and emails to other Aggies with a hearty "Thanks and Gig 'em!". The term "Gig 'em" was used at least by 1922 by the student body. The "Gig 'em" hand signal tradition began at a 1930 Midnight Yell Practice held before the football game against the Texas Christian University Horned Frogs. In an attempt to excite the crowd, Pinky Downs, a 1906 Texas A&M graduate and member of the school's Board of Regents, asked "What are we going to do to those Horned Frogs?" Using a term for frog hunting already used by the student body, he answered his own question, "Gig 'em, Aggies!" and made a fist with the thumb extended. The hand signal proved popular, and it became the first hand sign of the Southwest Conference. Gig 'em is also the name of one of the school yells, which is used during football kickoffs.

The university's traditions council recognizes another possible origin for the expression. The word "gig" is used in the US Army to indicate an infraction of the uniform code, and the A&M cadets used the same vocabulary. New cadets would quickly learn to fear being "gigged" during inspection for having unshined shoes, unpolished brass, or a non-aligned "gig line".

=== Aggie Ring ===
The most visible way for graduates of Texas A&M to recognize each other is by the Aggie Ring. The Aggie Ring is worn by current students and alumni, and is one of the most well-known symbols of the Aggie Network. The current Aggie Ring was designed by E. C. Jonas in 1894, and the design has remained relatively unchanged since – the only major change came when the school's name was changed from the Agricultural and Mechanical College of Texas to Texas A&M University in 1963.

The Aggie Ring cannot be purchased unless specific academic requirements are met, and many students receive their Rings on Aggie Ring Day, which is held at the Clayton W. Williams Jr. Alumni Center three times yearly. Traditionally, students wear their Rings with the class year facing them to signify the fact that their time at A&M is not yet complete. At the annual Ring Dance, or at the end of the student's collegiate career, the student turns his Ring around so that the class year faces away, symbolizing readiness to "face the world."

For decades, though unsanctioned and discouraged by the university, an unofficial tradition among willing students involves "dunking" the newly acquired Aggie Ring. The Ring is dropped in a pitcher of beer and the student chugs the entire pitcher and catches the Ring in his or her teeth. Some students choose to dunk their Rings in alternative substances, including ice cream or nonalcoholic beverages.

== Honoring the deceased ==
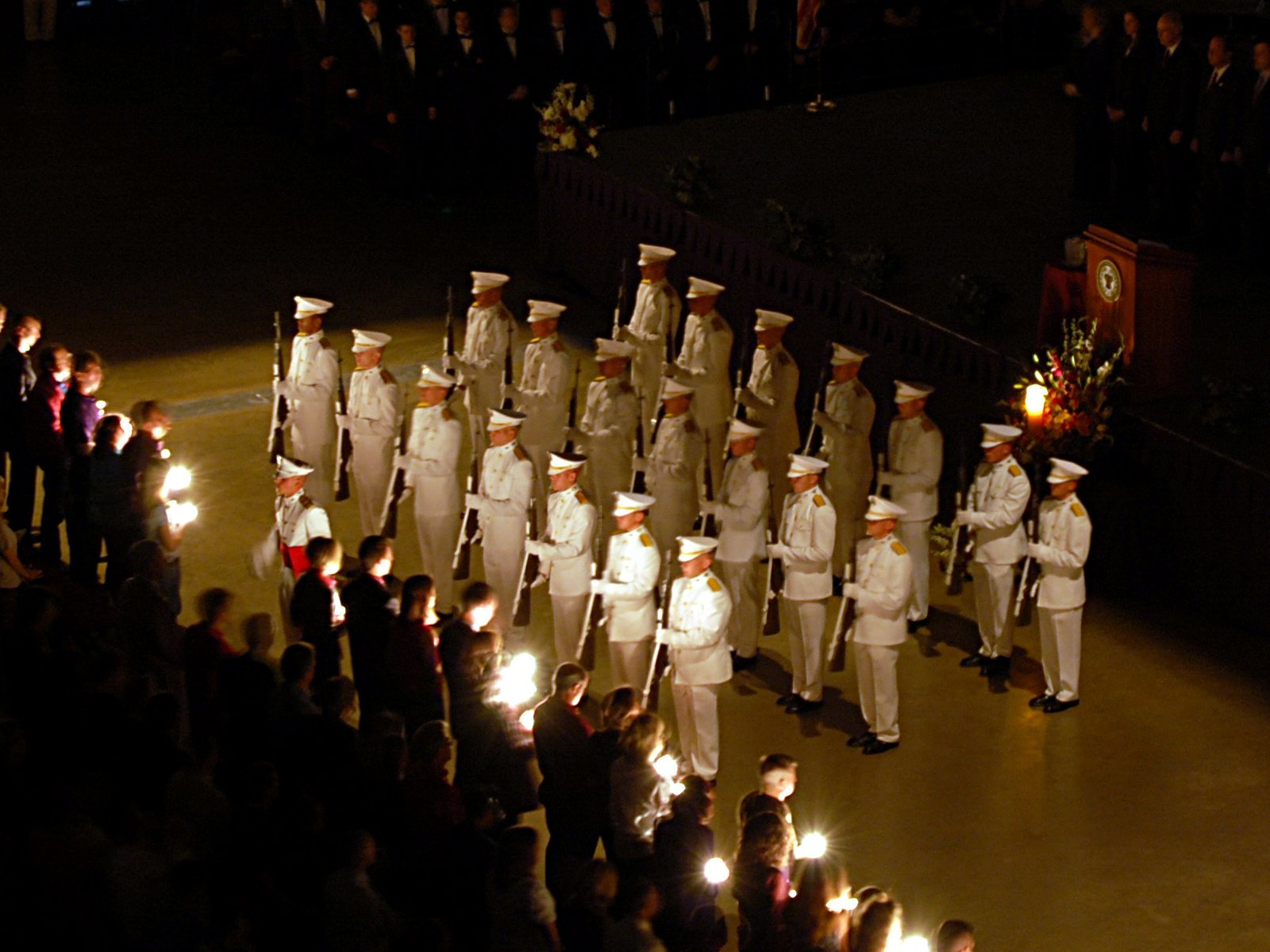
2007 Aggie Muster at Reed Arena. The Ross Volunteers stand at 'present arms' as candles are lit for the deceased.

In keeping with the idea that all current students and alumni comprise a family, Aggies have created two traditions to honor members of the Aggie family who have died. Aggie Muster is held annually to honor any current students or alumni who died during the previous year, while Silver Taps is held monthly as a special tribute to deceased current students.

According to the Houston Chronicle, "perhaps the best, most meaningful Aggie tradition of all is one you wish never happened." While students at many schools prize their individuality, "Aggies are all about unity and loyalty. When an Aggie falls, the family comes together to remember." This remembrance occurs annually on April 21 as Aggies observe Muster, a solemn event to honor current students and alumni who died during the previous year. Over 300 Musters are held around the world, with the largest taking place at Reed Arena on the Texas A&M University campus. All Muster ceremonies feature the Roll Call for the Absent. As the names of the deceased Aggies are called, a family member or friend answers "Here," and lights a candle, to symbolize that although their loved one is not present in body, his or her spirit will shine forever.

The first Aggie Muster was held June 26, 1883, seven years after the school opened. Rather than a memorial service, the event was intended as a reunion to allow alumni to gather and remember their college days. During the day, the alumni also established a "Roll Call for the Absent" to honor their classmates who could not attend. In 1889, the gathering was moved to April 21 and became an official school holiday, set aside for the annual cadet track and field competition. On April 21, 1903, the tradition evolved into a celebration of Texas's victory at the Battle of San Jacinto. Gatherings would include field games and banquets so Aggies could reflect on their days in Aggieland.

The field day events were cancelled in 1922, although alumni were still expected to congregate annually for camaraderie and to remember their fellow Aggies. The March 1923 Texas Aggie urged, "If there is an A&M man in one-hundred miles of you, you are expected to get together, eat a little, and live over the days you spent at the A&M College of Texas." The event received worldwide attention during and after World War II – first, when 25 Aggies "mustered" during the battle for the island of Corregidor at the entrance of Manila Bay in the Philippines, and then when 128 Aggies mustered on Corregidor on April 21, 1946 – the first postwar Muster. The same day, General Douglas MacArthur sent a message to Texas A&M on that date, praising the bravery of their soldiers who had given their lives on Corregidor and elsewhere.

== Silver Taps ==
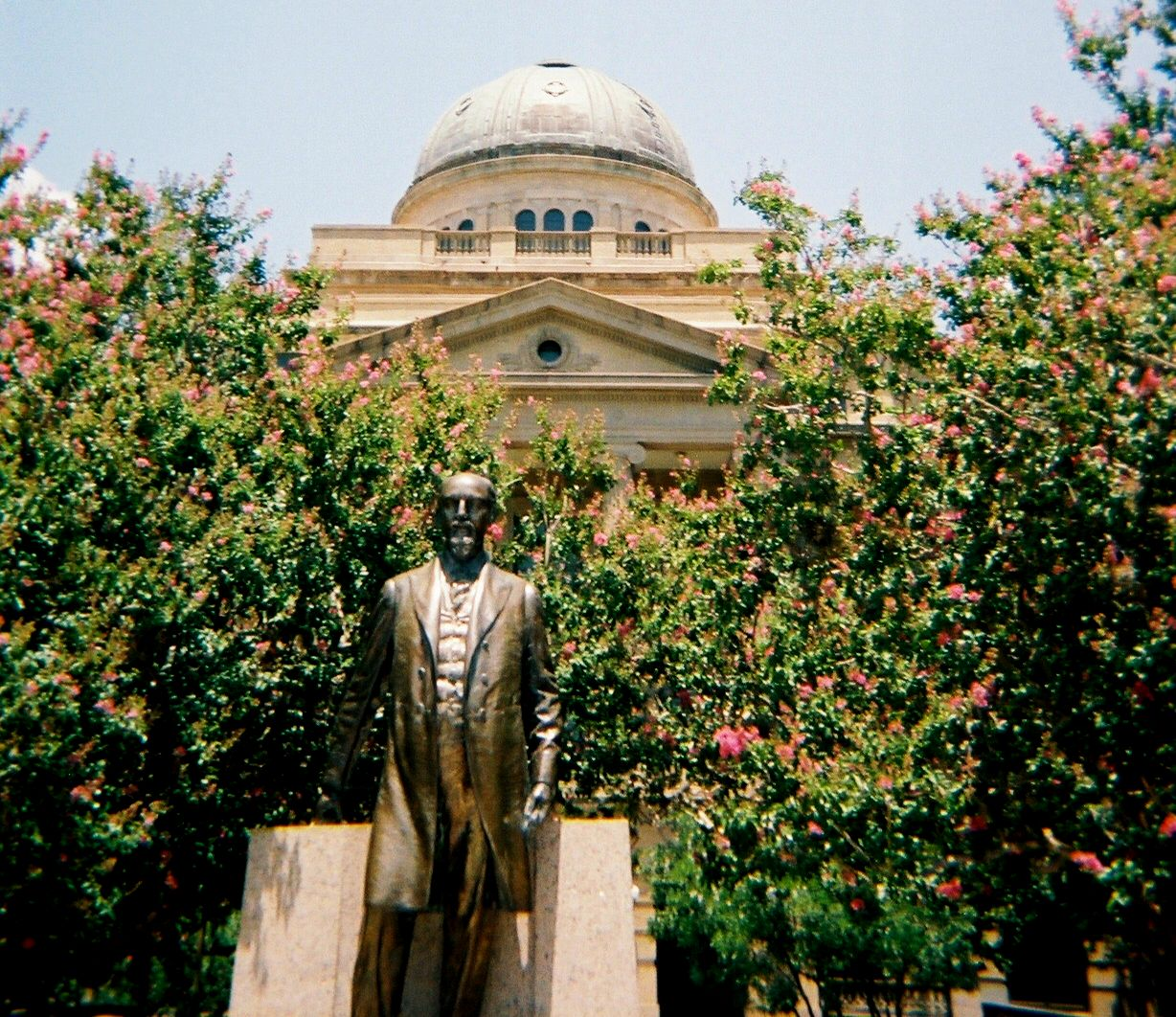
Silver Taps is held in front of this statue of Sul Ross. Buglers are stationed at the top of the Academic Building, in the background.

Students who die while enrolled at Texas A&M are also honored at Silver Taps, a ceremony held, when necessary, on the first Tuesday of the month. This tradition began as a memorial for former Texas A&M president Lawrence Sullivan Ross. In the modern incarnation, on the morning of Silver Taps, a small card with the deceased student's name, class, major, and birthdate is placed as a notice at the base of the flagpole in Academic Plaza. A write-up of the student's life and who they were, typically with quotes from their friends and family, appears in that week's print edition of The Battalion. At 10:15 p.m., all lights on campus are extinguished, and Albritton Tower begins to chime hymns. When the music begins, students gather in silence in front of the statue of Lawrence Sullivan Ross at Academic Plaza. At 10:30 pm, the Ross Volunteers march into the plaza and fire a 3-volley salute. Buglers stationed at the top of the Academic Building then play a special rendition of Taps, known as Silver Taps. The song is played three times; once to the north, once to the south, and once to the west. It is never played to the east, "because the sun will never rise on that Aggie again." Once the buglers have finished their tribute, the crowd disperses. Generally, students remain silent until reaching their homes.

== Texas A&M Corps of Cadets ==
The Corps of Cadets (or the Corps) is known as the "Keepers of the Spirit" for its staunch defense of Aggie traditions. The Corps is a link to the early days of Texas A&M's history, when all students were required to be members and receive military training. Although Corps membership became voluntary in 1965, as of 2001 it was the United States' largest uniformed student body outside the service academies, with an enrollment of over 2,500 cadets at the beginning of the 2016–2017 school year.

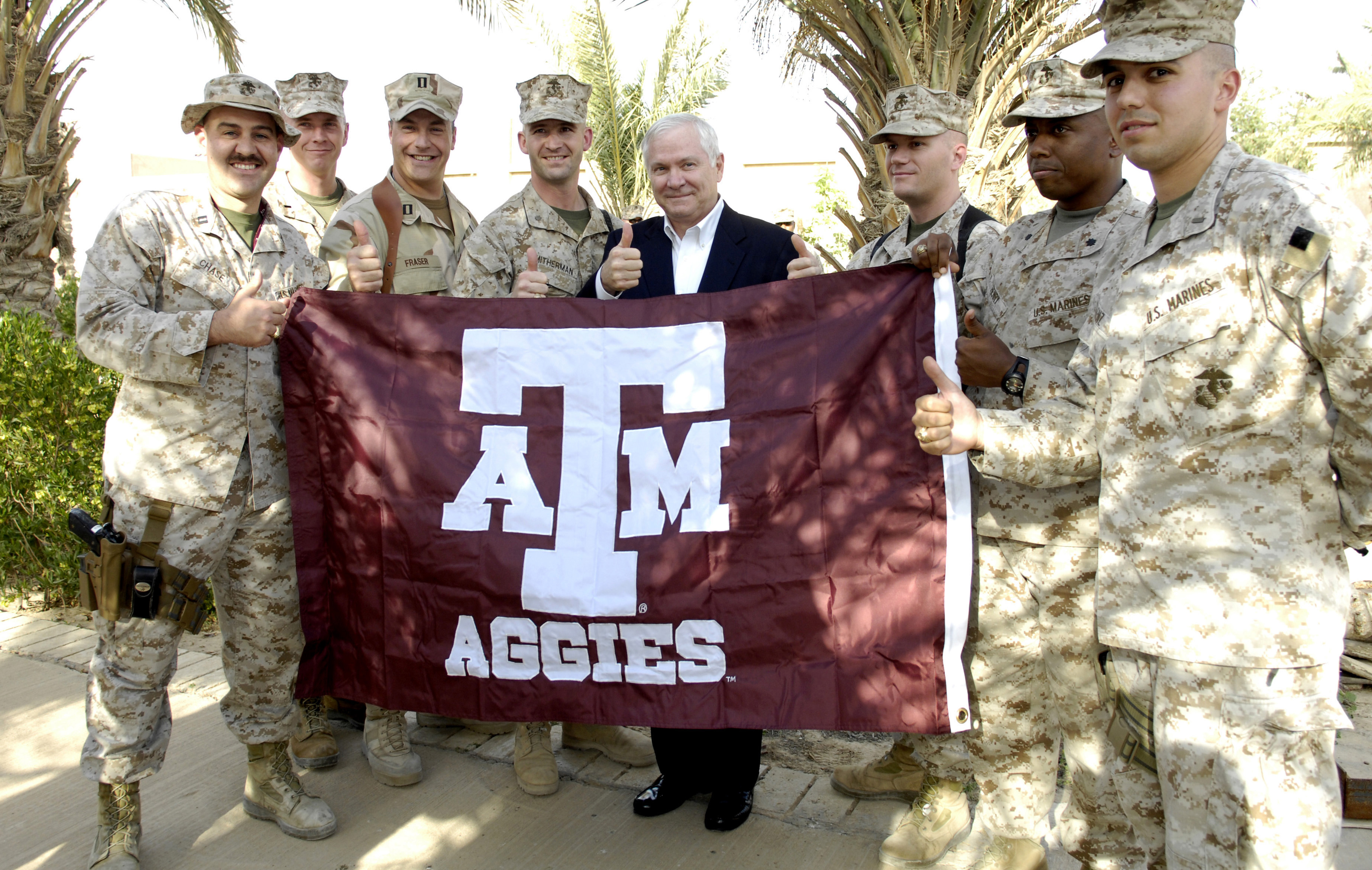
US Secretary of Defense Robert Gates gives a gig 'em with a group of Aggie Marines at Camp Fallujah, Iraq

Members of the Corps have served in every armed conflict fought by the United States since 1876, and over 225 have served as Generals or Flag Officers. Many members participate in ROTC programs and earn commissions in the United States Armed Forces upon graduation. As of fall 2012, the Corps is composed of forty-six units formed under three Air Force Wings, three Army Brigades, three Navy and Marine Regiments, as well as the Fightin' Texas Aggie Band, whose members may be affiliated with any military branch. Among its notable units is Parson's Mounted Cavalry, the only mounted ROTC unit in the United States. The Ross Volunteer Company, the oldest student-run organization in the state, is the official honor guard for the Governor of Texas. The Fish Drill Team, a precision, close-order rifle drill team composed entirely of Corps freshmen, represents the Corps and A&M in local and national competitions. They have won the national championship almost every year since their creation in 1946, and have appeared in several Hollywood productions with prominent roles in the movies A Few Good Men and Courage Under Fire.

Members of the Corps are often referred to as "C.T.s" or "B.Q.s". While these terms originally stood for "Cadet in Training" and "Band Qualified", respectively, they are more commonly and derisively used to abbreviate "Corps Turd" and "Band Queer". Freshmen in the Corps are required to "whip out" to upperclassmen. This tradition requires the freshmen to extend their hand and introduce themselves to the upperclassman. From then on, they are expected to know the name of the person to whom they "whipped out." The tradition applies only to upperclassmen in the Corps, and not to "non-regs", students who are not in the Corps.

One of a senior cadet's "most cherished possessions" are his Senior Boots. Only seniors are allowed to wear these knee-high riding boots, and most consider receiving their boots to be a rite of passage. All Senior Boots are custom-made to fit the cadet and are a dark tan to brown color. Students wear their Senior Boots for the first time after Final Review as juniors while saluting the outgoing seniors. Final review is the last activity that Corps members participate in as a unit. This full military review takes place at the end of the spring semester on Simpson Drill Field, and is in two parts. The entire Corps march past a reviewing stand, which consists of high-ranking military and university officials, for inspection. The Corps then returns to their dorms to change into the uniforms they will wear the following year, with the juniors donning their Senior Boots. The freshmen, sophomores, and juniors then march in formation past the reviewing stand, which is now filled with the senior cadets, saluting their former leaders.

Traditionally, male freshmen cadets receive very short haircuts consisting of no more than 1/4” of hair on top and stubble on the sides, a style known as a High and tight. The cadets keep the haircuts throughout freshman year and most must have it cut at least once a week to meet the standard.

== Fightin' Texas Aggie Band ==
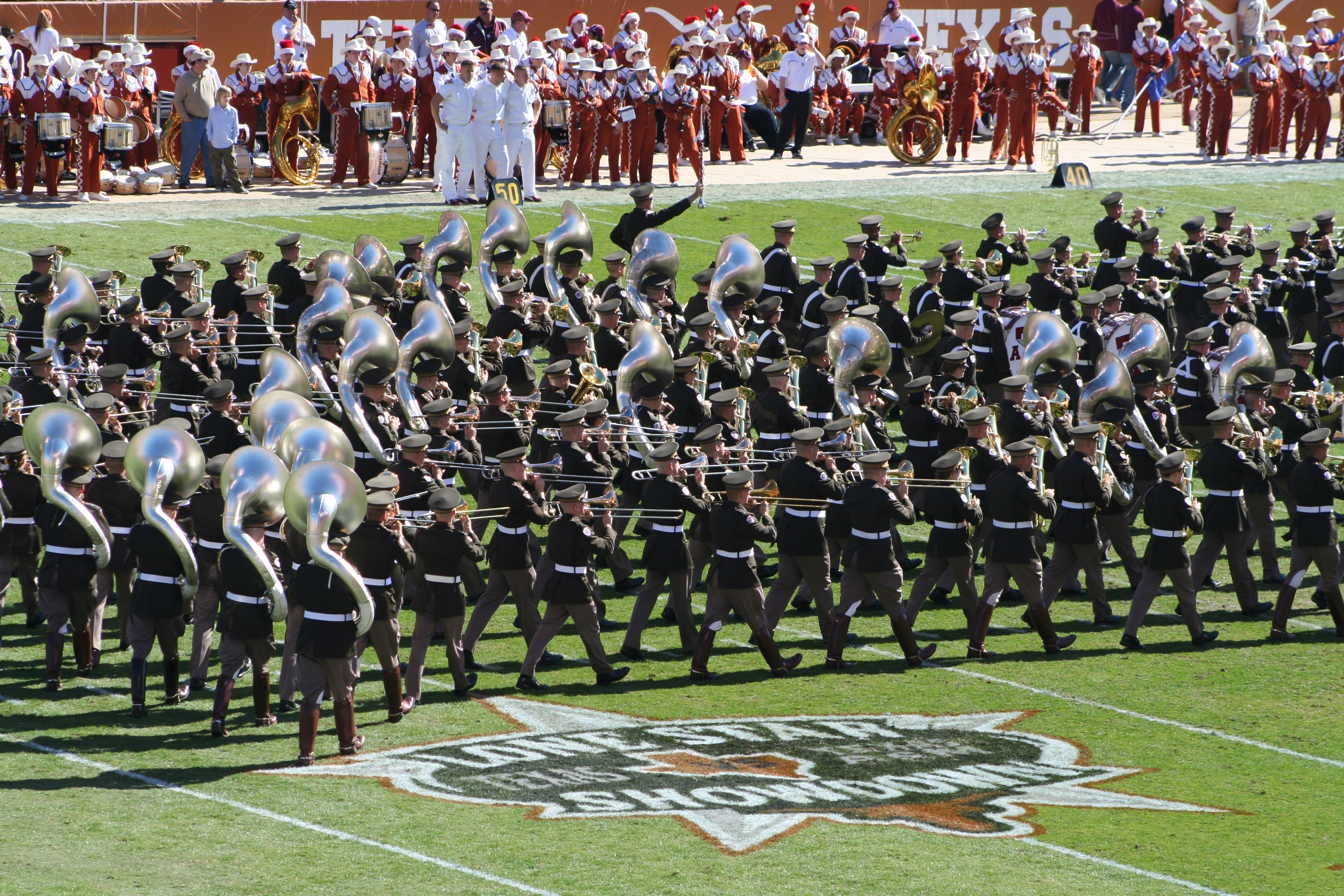
2006 Lone Star Showdown - Fightin' Texas Aggie Band marches past the Lone Star Showdown logo in Darrell K. Royal Texas Memorial Stadium

The Fightin' Texas Aggie Band (also known as The Noble Men of Kyle, The Pulse of Aggieland or the Aggie Band) is the official marching band of Texas A&M University. Composed of over 400 men and women from the school's Corps of Cadets, it is the largest military marching band in the world. The band's complex straight-line marching maneuvers are performed exclusively to traditional marches. Some of these maneuvers are so complex, some computer programs used to create marching drills say they cannot be performed because they require two people to be in the same place at the same time.

Since its inception in 1894, its members, known as BQs (for Band Qualified or Band Queer), eat together, sleep in the same dormitories, and practice up to 40 hours per week on top of a full academic schedule. The Aggie Band performs at all home football games, some away games, and university and Corps functions throughout the year. Other events in which the band participated include inauguration parades for many United States Presidents and Texas Governors, major annual parades across the country, and the dedication ceremony for the George H. W. Bush Presidential Library.

== Sports traditions ==
=== 12th Man ===
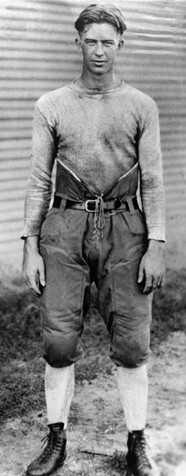
Texas A&M's E. King Gill during the 1921–1922 season, the original Twelfth Man

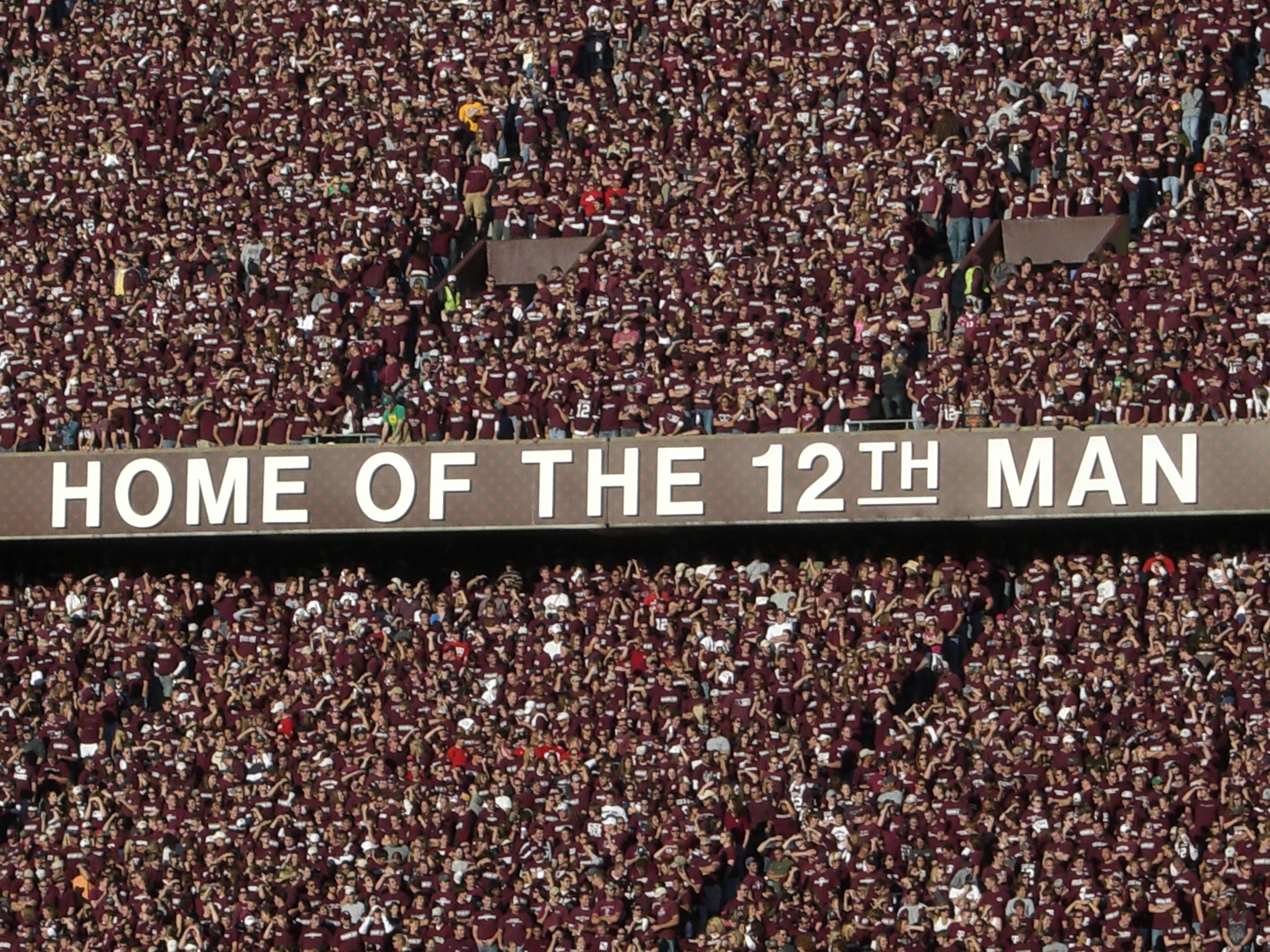
Kyle Field during 2006 Maroon Out

The student body refers to itself as "The 12th Man", meaning they are ready to replace any injured football player during a football game. To further symbolize their "readiness, desire, and enthusiasm", the entire student body stands throughout the game. In a further show of respect, the students step "off the wood" (step off of the bleachers onto the concrete) whenever a player is injured or when the band plays the Aggie War Hymn or The Spirit of Aggieland. At the end of the Aggie War Hymn, fans sway back and forth, causing the upper deck of the stadium to move. The Aggie War Hymn was named the No. 1 college fight song by USA Today in 1997.

The 12th Man tradition began in Dallas at the 1922 edition of the Dixie Classic, the forerunner of the Cotton Bowl Classic. A&M played defending national champion Centre College in the first postseason game in the southwest. In this hard-fought game, which produced national publicity, an underdog Aggie team was slowly defeating a team which had allowed fewer than six points per game. The first half produced so many injuries for A&M, Coach D. X. Bible feared he would not have enough men to finish the game. At that moment, he called into the Aggie section of the stands for E. King Gill, a student who had left football after the regular season to play basketball. Gill, who was spotting players for a Waco newspaper and was not in football uniform, donned the uniform of injured player Heine Weir and stood on the sidelines to await his turn. Although he did not actually play in the game, his readiness to play symbolized the willingness of all Aggies to support their team to the point of actually entering the game. When the game ended in a 22-14 Aggie victory, Gill was the only man left standing on the sidelines for the Aggies. Gill later said, "I wish I could say that I went in and ran for the winning touchdown, but I did not. I simply stood by in case my team needed me." A statue of E. King Gill stands to the north of Kyle Field to remind Aggies of their constant obligation to preserve the spirit of the 12th Man.

In the 1980s, the tradition was expanded as coach Jackie Sherrill created the 12th Man squad. Composed solely of walk-on (nonscholarship) players, the squad would take the field for special teams performances. This squad only allowed one kick return for a touchdown by Texas Tech's Rodney Blackshear. Sherrill's successor, R. C. Slocum, amended the tradition in the 1990s to allow one walk-on player, wearing the No. 12 jersey, to take the field for special teams plays. The player is chosen based on the level of determination and hard work shown in practices. Coach Dennis Franchione continued Slocum's model, while also keeping an all-walk-on kickoff team that played three times in the 2006 season.

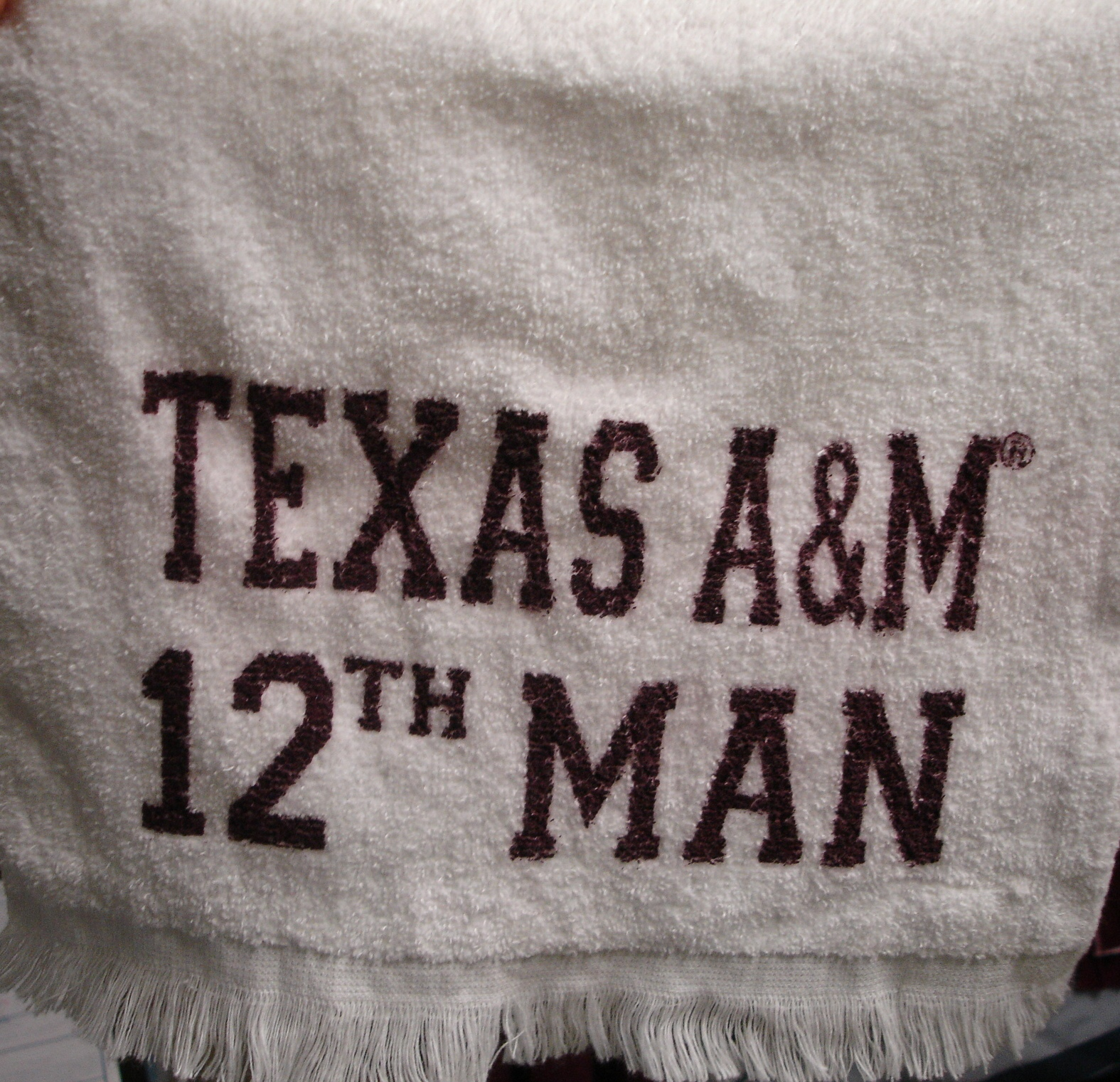
12th Man towel

Because the students are always waiting for the opportunity to support their team, they are also willing to take the credit for the team's good deeds. A popular Aggie tradition is that "when the team scores, everybody scores". Whenever the Aggies score points during the game, students kiss their dates.

Seniors wearing either their Senior Boots or Aggie Rings are also encouraged to join the "Boot Line". As the Fightin' Texas Aggie Band leaves the field after their halftime performances, seniors line up at the south end of Kyle Field to welcome the team back onto the field for the second half.

=== Yells ===
Unlike many schools, which have a large group of cheerleaders to rally their fans during sporting events, Texas A&M has five student Yell Leaders. Consisting of three seniors and two juniors, historically all male, the Yell Leaders are elected to their positions annually by the student body. These students do not perform gymnastic feats, but instead use hand signals, known as "pass backs", to direct and intensify crowds. After the signals are passed through the crowd, the Yell Leaders give the signal to "hump it", where the crowd leans forward and places their hands on their knees to maximize the noise. The Yell Leaders have a dozen yells that they can choose from depending on the situation. While some yells are designed to praise and motivate the team, others exist solely to make fun of the opposing side.

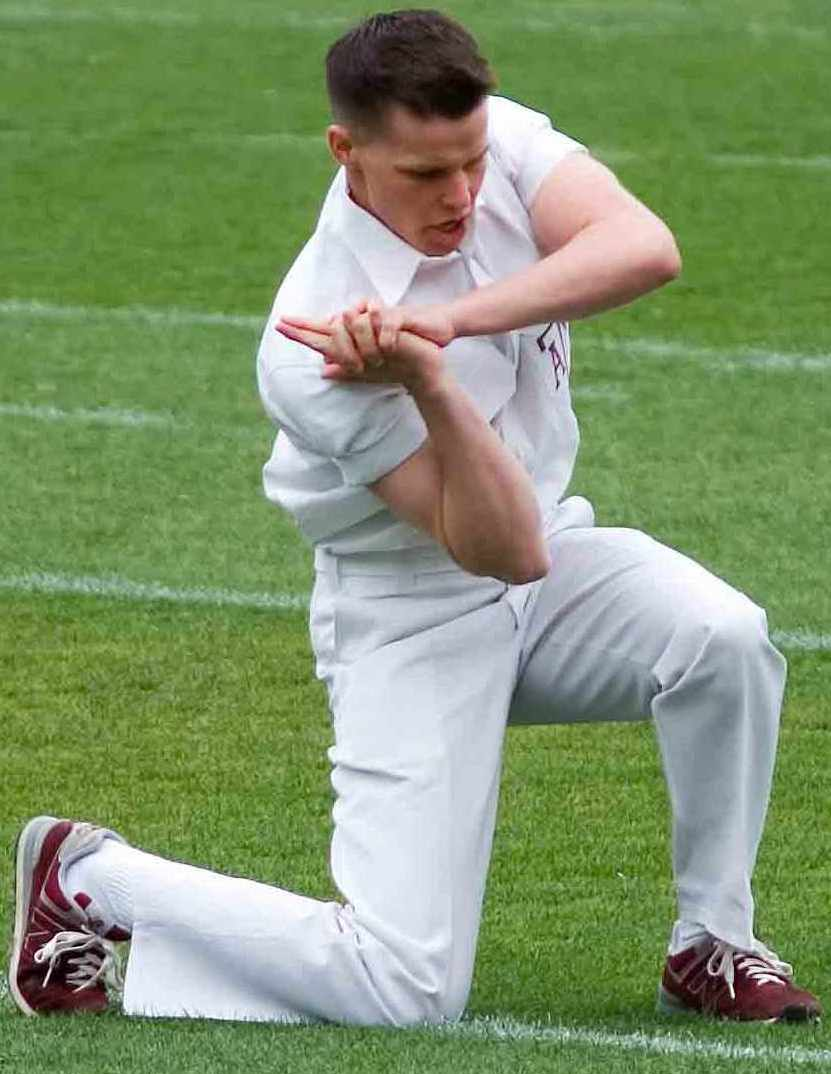
Junior Yell Leader Connor Joseph doing the "whoop" hand signal on the field at a football game.

Students practice the yells at Midnight Yell Practice. Held at Kyle Field at midnight the night before a football game, Midnight Yell is similar to a pep rally. Over 20,000 Aggies attend each session, practicing the yells that will be used in the following day's game and generating an excitement for the game. At the conclusion of the yell practice, the stadium lights are extinguished and fans kiss their dates. This is also done as practice, because Aggies are expected to "mug down", or kiss their dates, every time the football team scores on the field. Sports Illustrated named Midnight Yell as one of the "100 Things You Gotta Do Before You Graduate."

Aggies practice their yells again after each football game. If the team is victorious, the freshmen in the Corps of Cadets capture the Yell Leaders on Kyle Field and march them across campus to be dunked in Fish Pond. The wet Yell Leaders then make their way to the YMCA Building, where the Fightin' Texas Aggie Band and members of the crowd join them for a short yell practice in preparation for the next week's game. If the team loses —or, as Aggies put it, they are "outscored" or "run out of time"—a mini-Yell Practice is held in Kyle Field before the crowd disperses.

The most well-known Aggie yell is the simple "Beat the Hell Outta" the opposing school. In writing, this is often abbreviated as BTHO. For the annual game against the University of Texas at Austin, students yell "Beat the Hell Outta t.u." Booing is strongly discouraged, and an upset Aggie will instead hiss their opponents or the referees. If a referee call is especially egregious in the minds of the Aggies, the Yell Leaders will call for the "Horse Laugh," a yell that ends with a stadium wide hissing.

After each yell, students make a noise and a hand motion that is known as a wildcat. Each class has a separate wildcat, and students caught "pulling out," or using the wildcat of a higher class, are often forced to do pushups as punishment. Freshmen raise their hands above their heads and yell "AAAA". Sophomores, symbolically pushing back on the seniors, chant "A!" five times, waving their hands up and down in front of the torso with their index fingers extended and thumbs perpendicular. Juniors yell "A! A! A! Whoop!" wrapping their left hand over their right fist, with both index fingers extended and pointing towards the ground, "shooting the ground" once for each "A" and holding the position on the "whoop!" As a symbol of their expert marksmanship, seniors yell a single "A!" and then "Whoop!" while interlocking their fingers with their index fingers extended and pointed into the air. At the same time, the left foot is raised and tucked behind the right knee. The fingers are interlocked rather than covering the right hand so that the Aggie Ring is visible.

=== Mascots ===
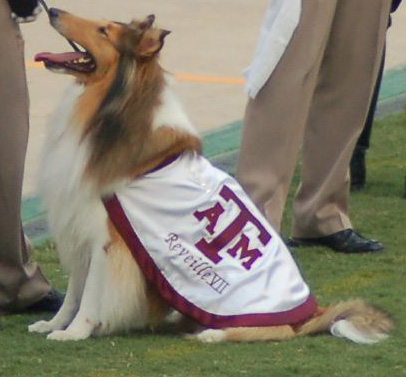
Reveille VII at a football game

Texas A&M's official mascot is Reveille, now a purebred Rough Collie. The first Reveille, a mixed breed dog, was adopted by students in 1931 after they found her on the side of the road. As of 2022, the current mascot is Reveille X. She is considered a Cadet General, the highest-ranking member in the Corps of Cadets, and must be addressed by cadets as "Miss Reveille, ma'am."

Reveille accompanies her handlers, members of the E-2 unit of the Corps of Cadets, everywhere, including classes. It is a long-held tradition that if Reveille decides to sleep on a cadet's bed, that cadet is required to sleep on the floor. In truth, however, this only applied to the early mascots who were allowed to freely roam the campus. The contemporary mascots, certainly since the 1980s and likely earlier, are under the constant supervision of the Mascot Corporal and not allowed to freely roam about the cadet's quarters. Another tradition is that if she chooses to bark in class, that session is cancelled. Upon the death of a current or former mascot, a full military funeral is held at Kyle Field, which usually attracts several thousand mourners.

Texas A&M also has an unofficial mascot, Ol' Sarge, who is displayed only in graphics. Ol' Sarge is portrayed as a tough-looking corps drill sergeant and is considered one of the many icons representing Texas A&M's long standing military history. The drawing was first seen in the 1940s, when The Battalion ran a caricature of one of the Yell Leaders. That caricature, of a rough and tough military man, quickly became used throughout campus.

=== The Spirit of '02 ===
A member of Parson's Mounted Cavalry guarding The Spirit of '02 before a home football game

The Corps of Cadets marks any Aggie scores during football games by firing The Spirit of '02, a 3-inch M1902 field gun 3-inch (76 mm). Issued to Field Artillery Units of the Reserve Officers' Training Corps between the World Wars, the gun was believed to be one of several that were hidden by Corps members to prevent them from being scrapped during WWII. The Spirit of '02 was found buried in a ditch by students cutting wood for the annual Aggie Bonfire in the fall of 1974. Only the rusted steel rims from the wooden wheels were showing above ground. Students mounted antique wagon wheels on the axles and brought the gun back to a place of honor in the Quad. Cadets later restored the gun, which has been fired to celebrate touchdowns since 1984. The gun is operated and maintained by the Parson's Mounted Cavalry Half Section, who drive the gun on a four horse team to every Aggie home game.

=== Maroon Out ===
One of Texas A&M's newer traditions is Maroon Out, which began in 1998. The football team had ended their 1997 season with a lopsided defeat to Nebraska in the Big 12 Championship Game. Amy Berger, Class of '99 Treasurer, and Kyle Valentine, Class of 2000 Junior President, noticed how united the Nebraska fans seemed, all dressed in red. She proposed to Class Councils the idea to "Maroon Out" Kyle Field for the October 10, 1998 rematch against Nebraska by selling a low-cost, high-quality maroon T-shirt. This resulted in the sale of 31,000 Maroon Out shirts, leading to a temporary national shortage of maroon-colored T-shirts.

The Aggies defeated Number 2 Nebraska 28–21, the first time in six seasons that Nebraska had lost a regular-season conference game. The Daily Nebraskan noted that "A game that was dubbed a 'maroon-out' for Texas A&M fans proved to be lights out for Nebraska. The fans dressed themselves in maroon T-shirts in an attempt to wash out the red and white that opponents have gotten used to. It worked."

Since then, one football game each season is dubbed an official Maroon Out, and discounted maroon T-shirts are for sale for fans. Through 2010, Texas A&M has been 7–6 in Maroon Out games, beating 6 teams ranked in the Top 25, despite being the underdog in each of the games. The basketball team has a similar tradition, called a "White Out," where fans are encouraged to wear white T-shirts.

Perhaps the most memorable Maroon Out moment was not maroon at all. After the events of September 11, 2001, five Aggie students wished to help honor America. They decided to ask the attendees of the next A&M football game, which would be held at Kyle Field on September 22, 2001, to wear patriotic colors. The colors would be divided by deck, with the upper deck wearing red, the middle deck wearing white, and the lower deck in blue. Within a five-day period the students had contracted with several printers to create special T-shirts which read "Standing for America" and the date. Despite initial concerns about not being able to sell enough shirts to be effective, the students sold about 70,000 of these shirts, raising over $150,000 for the relief efforts.

== Aggie Bonfire ==
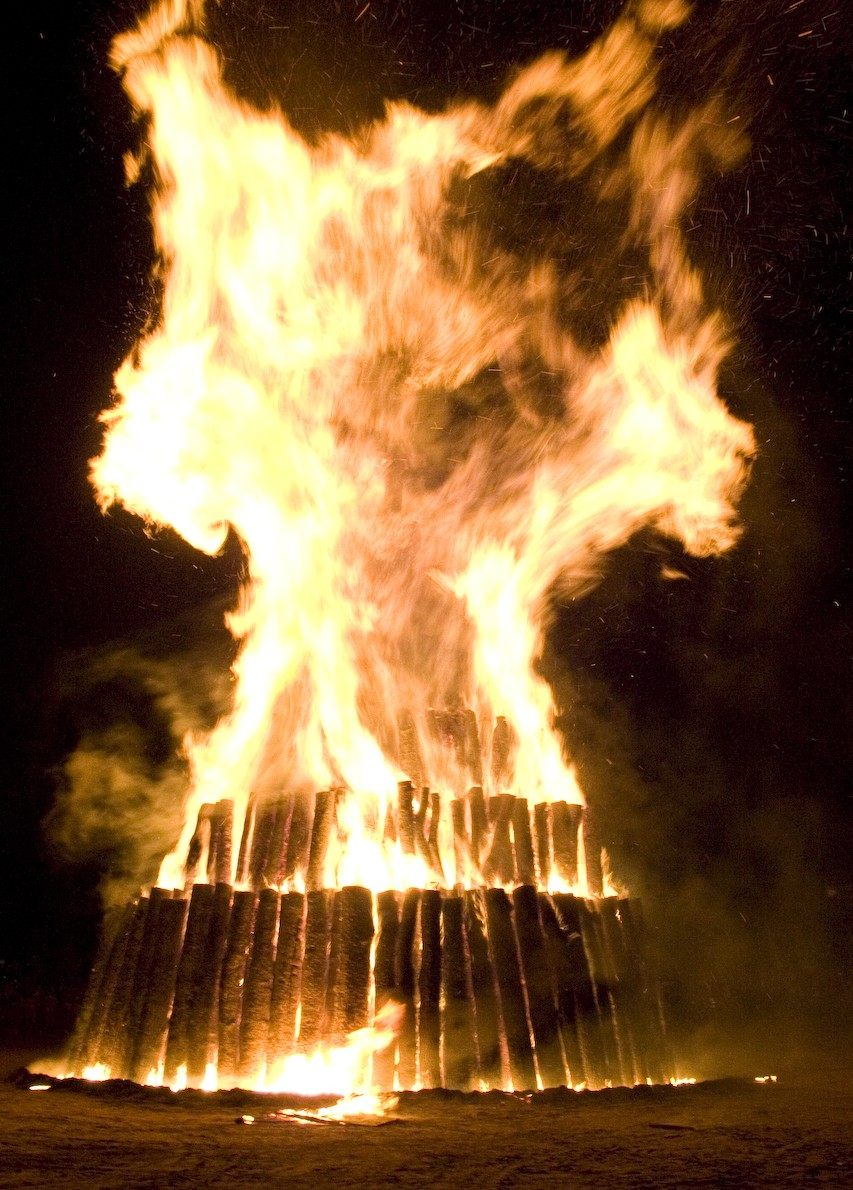
The 2007 Student Bonfire

Aggie Bonfire was a long-standing tradition at Texas A&M University as part of a college rivalry with the University of Texas at Austin, known as t.u. by Texas A&M students. For ninety years, Texas A&M students built and burned a large bonfire on campus each fall. Known within the Aggie community simply as Bonfire, the annual fall event symbolized the students' "burning desire to beat the hell outta t.u." The bonfire was traditionally lit around Thanksgiving in conjunction with the festivities surrounding the annual college football game between the schools.

The first on-campus Aggie Bonfire was burned in 1909, and the tradition continued for the next 90 years. For almost two decades, Bonfire was constructed from debris and pieces of wood that Aggies "found," including lumber intended for a dormitory that students appropriated in 1912. The event became school-sanctioned in 1936, and, for the first time, students were provided with axes, saws, and trucks and pointed towards a grove of dead trees on the edge of town. In the following years the Bonfire became more elaborate, and in 1967 the flames could be seen 25 miles (40 km) away. In 1969, the stack set the world record at 111 feet (30 m) tall.

While the Bonfires of the 1960s were constructed in five to ten days, working primarily in daylight, by the late 1970s a more elaborate construction schedule had been implemented. Construction began in late October with "Cut", with several weekends devoted to cutting down the logs with axes. The logs were brought to campus during "Load." In early November, crews began "Stack", a three-week period in which the logs were wired together and Bonfire took shape. Near the end of stack, known as "Push", students worked around the clock in rotating shifts. Although between two and five thousand students participated in the construction of Bonfire each year, most of them were unable to devote themselves full-time to the task, and many worked only one or two shifts. While participating, the students wore "grodes," old T-shirts, jeans, and boots. By tradition, grodes were either not washed until after Bonfire burned or not washed at all.

In 1978, Bonfire shifted to a wedding-cake style, in which upper stacks of logs were wedged on top of lower stacks. The structure was built around a fortified centerpole, made from two telephone poles. Although tradition stated that if Bonfire burned through midnight A&M would win the following day's game, with the introduction of the wedding cake design Bonfire began to fall quickly, sometimes burning for only 30 or 45 minutes.

At 2:42 AM on November 18, 1999, the partially completed Aggie Bonfire, standing 40 feet (10 m) tall and consisting of about 5,000 logs, collapsed during construction. Of the 58 students and alumni working on the stack, 12 were killed and 27 others were injured. On November 25, 1999, the date that Bonfire would have burned, Aggies instead held a vigil and remembrance ceremony. Over 40,000 people, including former President George H. W. Bush and his wife Barbara and then-Texas governor George W. Bush and his wife Laura, lit candles and observed up to two hours of silence at the site of the Bonfire collapse. The Bonfire Memorial was officially dedicated on November 18, 2004.

Bonfire was postponed until 2002 to restructure it to make it safer. Delays in the development of a safety plan and a high estimated cost (mainly due to liability insurance), led A&M president Ray Bowen to postpone Bonfire indefinitely. Despite the university's refusal to allow Bonfire to take place on campus, since 2002 a non-university sanctioned Bonfire has burned annually. Known as Student Bonfire, the off-campus event draws between 8,000 and 15,000 fans.

== Elephant Walk ==
Every November, in the week of the football game against the University of Texas, the senior class gathered together for Elephant Walk. The seniors link arms and "wander aimlessly" through campus. The University of Texas game was always the last football game of the regular season, so Elephant Walk has come to symbolize the end of the seniors' "usefulness" to the 12th Man and the passing of the torch to the junior class. In a reference to Elephant Walk, seniors in their last semester of study are often called "dead elephants." Texas A&M left the Big 12 and joined the SEC beginning with the Football season of 2012. The last Football game against the University of Texas took place on November 24, 2011, in which the Longhorns delivered a 27–25 victory over Texas A&M.

Elephant Walk began in 1926, when a group of students decided to take one last walk around campus to remember their experiences at the school. Because they walked single file, with a hand on the shoulder of the person in front, an observer remarked that they "looked like elephants, about to die." The day now begins at Kyle Field with a yell practice and speaker, and then the senior yell leaders lead the class through campus. Leaders of the graduating class also announce the class gift at Elephant Walk.

== Service projects ==
Texas A&M provides many opportunities for students to participate in volunteer and service activities. Students at Texas A&M originated The Big Event, which according to their website is the largest one-day student-run service project in the nation. The annual event began in 1982 after the Texas A&M Student Government Association passed a resolution encouraging students to show their gratitude to the community by giving of their time. From its beginnings of six individual students wanting to contribute back to the local community, The Big Event has expanded to allow over twenty-two thousand students to participate in over 2500 jobs, such as raking leaves, painting houses, and trimming trees. The concept for The Big Event has spread throughout the nation, and as of 2015, 110 schools across the nation participate each year including 1 middle school, 2 high schools, and 68 universities. The 2008 Big Event attracted 10,600 students who worked a record number of 1,000 jobs.

Aggies also participate annually in Replant, a one-day environmental service. In 2006, 1,000 students participated, planting 250 trees in three public parks. The event has been an annual tradition since 1991, when the Texas A&M Environmental Issues Committee began planting trees to replace those that had been cut down for Bonfire. Although Bonfire has been officially disbanded, Replant continues. Its goals are now to beautify the Bryan-College Station area and to "creat[e] harmony between students and the residents." In 2000, the group planted twelve live oak trees at the Texas A&M Polo Grounds in memory of the twelve victims of the 1999 Bonfire collapse. That year the group was awarded the Community Forestry Award from the Texas Forest Service. The group provides their own trees, grown at the Texas A&M Riverside campus in Bryan, Texas and has its own Student Government committee.

The Corps of Cadets annually conducts the March to the Brazos, a 14 miles (20 km) round-trip road march that serves as both a ceremony to transfer leadership as well as a fundraiser for the March of Dimes. The Corps hold various fundraisers and solicits donations throughout the year. On a Saturday morning, generally in April, each year, all members of the Corps gather at the Quadrangle, near their dormitories, and march en masse across campus and down Highway 60 to Texas A&M's Animal Science Teaching, Research & Extension Complex near the east bank of the Brazos River. There, the cadets learn who will fill each leadership position for the following year. The current seniors are allowed to ride a bus back to campus while the newly promoted cadets lead their outfits back to campus. The event is the largest and most successful student-run fundraising event in the United States for the March of Dimes. In its first 27 years, from 1977 through 2003, the event raised a combined US$1.3 million.

== Asking for luck ==
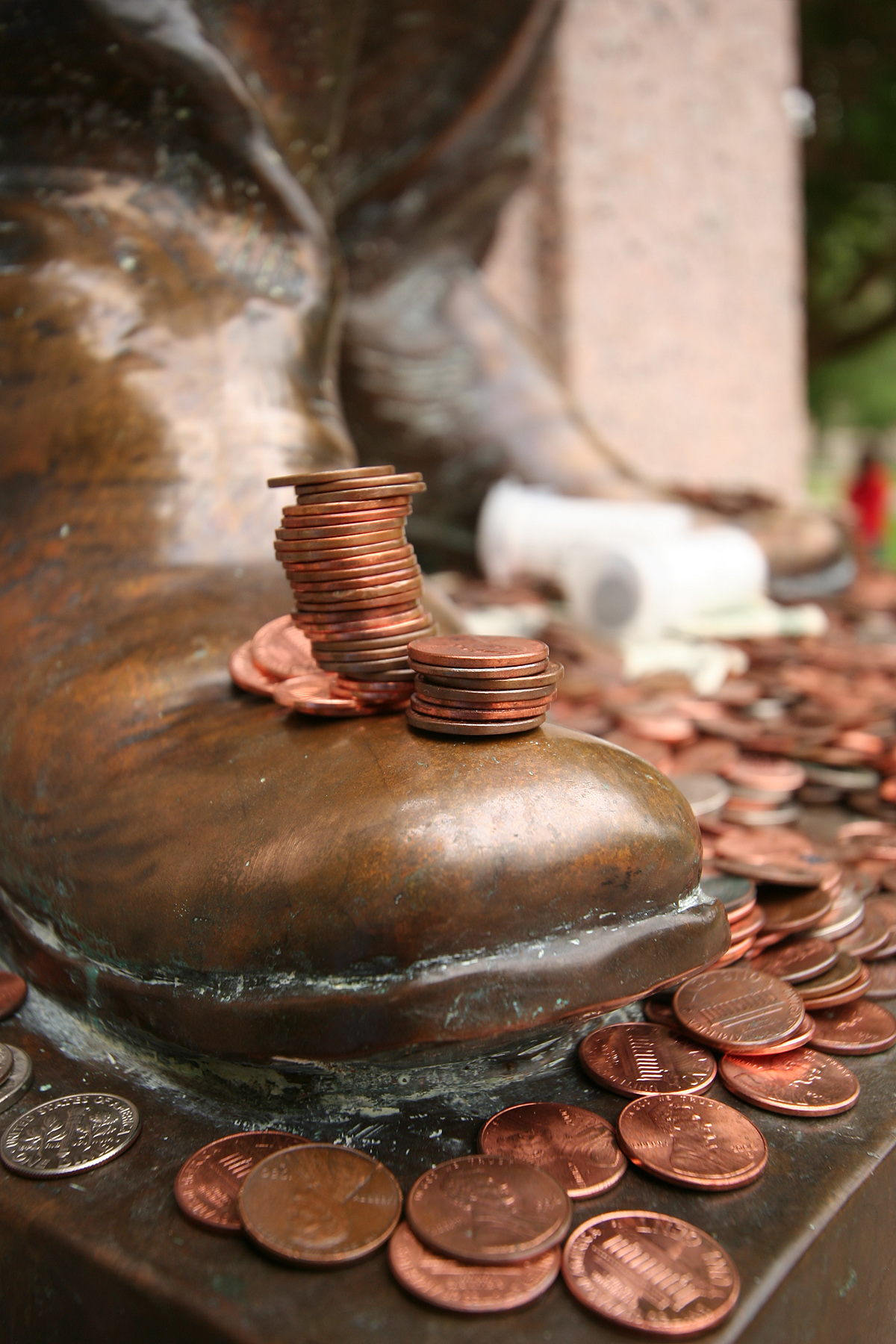
Students stack pennies at the feet of the Sul Ross statue for good luck on exams.

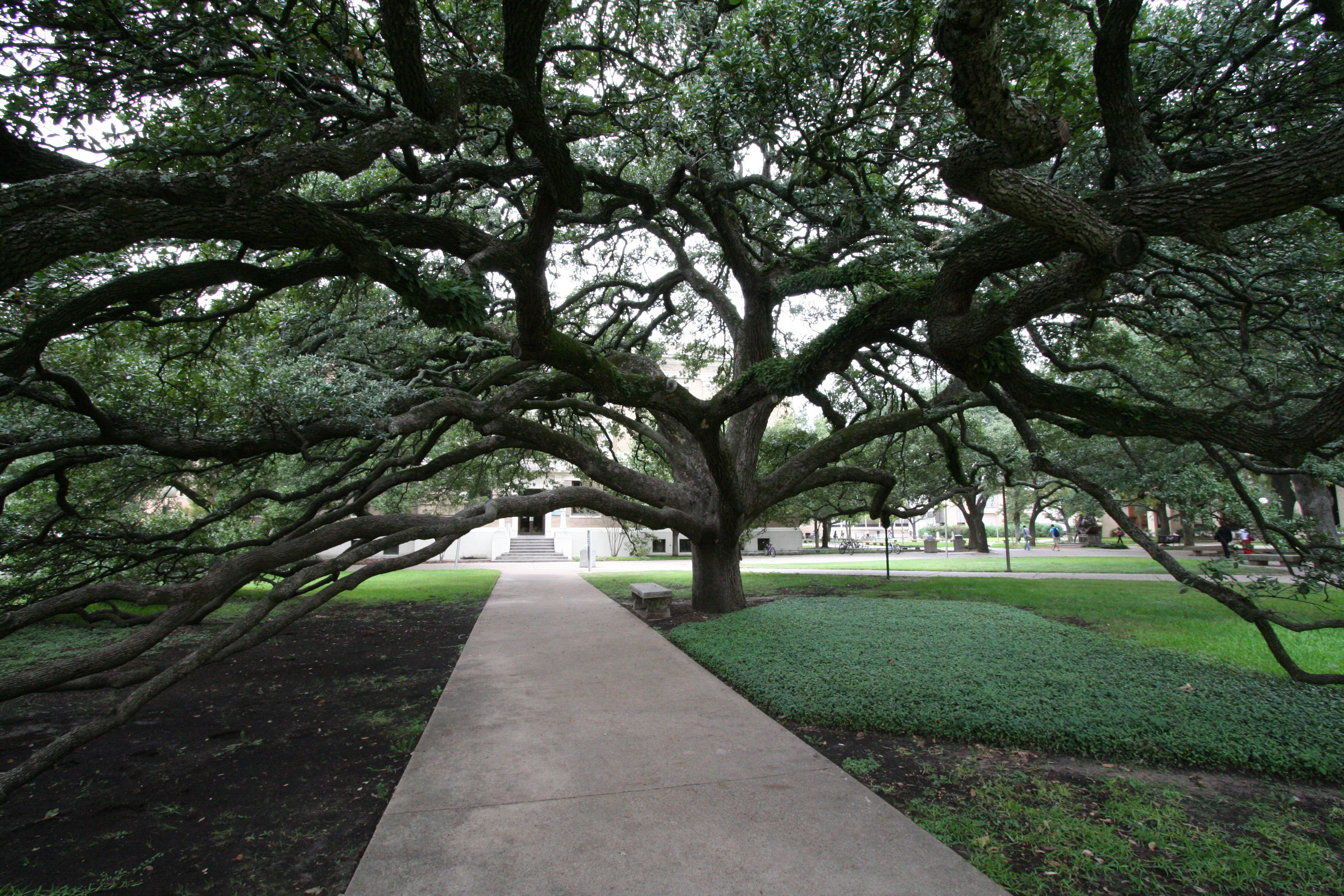
The Century Tree. The statue of Sul Ross is at the end of the path.

Many students believe that they will do well on exams if they make an offering to Lawrence Sullivan "Sul" Ross. Ross, president of the university from 1891 to 1898, was known for his legendary efforts to keep the college open; he is often credited as the embodiment of Aggie Spirit and tradition. A statue of the former Texas governor now stands as one of the most iconic landmarks on campus, situated in the heart of campus in the Academic Plaza. Those passing by the statue will notice stacks of pennies piled on the statue's base, each placed there by current students. The tradition to “put a penny on Sully” is another homage to Ross. It is said that Ross would help students with their homework, and when students would ask how they could repay him, Ross would reply with, “A penny for your thoughts.” Students leave pennies (as well as assorted bills, gift cards, and other trinkets) at the base of Sully for good luck before taking their exams. The items are collected each semester and donated to a local charitable organization.

Another spot in Academic Plaza is also believed to be lucky. Tradition says that if a couple walks together under the branches of the Century Tree, one of the oldest trees on campus, they will eventually marry. If the proposal takes place under the Century Tree, the marriage is supposed to last forever.

== Aggie Jargon ==
For much of its first 100 years, Texas A&M was a small, all-male, military academy. The school became coeducational in the 1960s, and membership in the Corps of Cadets became voluntary. In military tradition, privileges are meted out as one climbs the ranks, and Texas A&M has several such traditions. The most obvious are the uniforms worn by the Corps of Cadets. Corps members wear different uniforms for each year, culminating in the prized Senior boots.

Vocabulary is also restricted by class year. Freshmen may not say the word Pisshead, a nickname for sophomores. Juniors are known as "Serge Butts", so neither freshmen nor sophomores can say any form of either word (accordingly, words such as "button" must be replaced with roundabout euphemisms, such as "circular fastener"). Juniors are also the first class to be allowed to say "Whoop!" Seniors, known as "Zips" for the black and gold braid on their garrison caps, which resembles a zipper, have reserved the word elephant and all forms of the words "death," "dying," "shoot," or "reload" in reference to the traditions surrounding Elephant Walk. However, saying the phrases "pass away," "decease," "fire," "load again," etc., are all acceptable substitutes.

Students caught "pulling out", or saying words that are reserved for other classes, are forced to "push." Traditionally, this means the students must do a "class set" of pushups, one for each year of their class. The Class of 1945 did only 45 pushups and an extra pushup has been added for each subsequent year; the Class of 2012 now does 112. Pulling out privileges of the class directly above is considered "Good Bull", but pulling out two classes or more is "Bad Bull." Members of the Corps of Cadets generally take privileged words more seriously than non-reg students.

== See also ==
- Glossary of Texas A&M University terms
- MSC Student Conference on National Affairs
