= Glossary of Texas A&M University terms =

Many terms are unique to, or hold a special meaning connected with, Texas A&M University in College Station, Texas. The university, often called A&M or TAMU, is a public research university and is the flagship institution of the Texas A&M University System. It opened in 1876 as the Agricultural and Mechanical College of Texas, the first public institution of higher education in that state. In 1963, the Texas Legislature renamed the school to Texas A&M University to reflect the institution's expanded roles and academic offerings. The letters "A&M" no longer have any explicit meaning but are retained as a link to the university's past.

As a Senior Military College, Texas A&M is one of three public universities with a full-time, volunteer Corps of Cadets. It provides more commissioned officers to the United States Armed Forces than any other school outside the service academies.

Texas A&M University's history as an all-male military institution has led to a unique traditions and terminology. Some phrases come from traditions that include Aggie Bonfire and the athletics program. Other phrases are locations and landmarks around the campus. While most of these terms are used exclusively by Aggies, some are used by the university's rivals. Some terms exclusively used by the Corps of Cadets are not included to narrow the list size.

== # ==
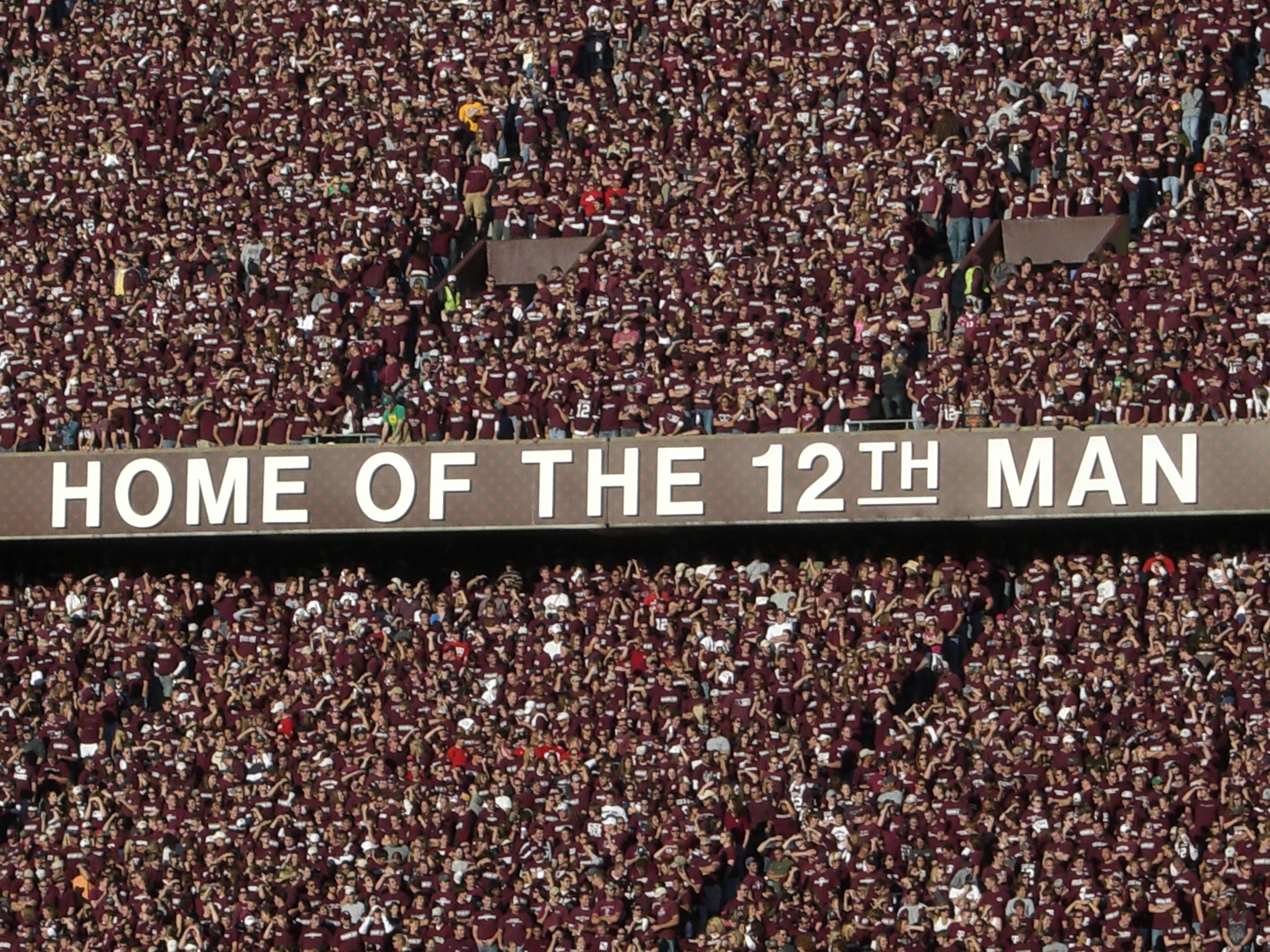
Texas A&M's football stadium, Kyle Field, student section with the sign "Home of the 12th Man"

2 Percenters
Aggies who choose not to participate in Texas A&M traditions.

12th Man
The student section in athletics events. As 11 men play on the football team, the 12th man represents the support off the field and a willingness to serve. During home football games, the student section stands the entire game to embody that spirit.

== A ==
A&M
The initials are part of the institution's original name, the "Agricultural and Mechanical College of Texas". The term no longer has any explicit meaning in the modern institution's name, but it remains as a link to the institution's past.

Aggie (or Ag)
A student, alumnus, or supporter of Texas A&M University. Several other land grant schools use "Aggie", such as New Mexico State and UC Davis. Adding the name of the state at the beginning of the term (i.e. "Texas Aggie") is often used to distinguish between the different schools.

"Aggies never lose, though they may run out of time"; "Aggies never lose, they just occasionally get outscored"
These quotes or variations of them are said after losing efforts. It gives voice to the idea that the team would have eventually won if the game would have gone on longer.

AggieCon
the oldest and largest student-run multigenre convention in the United States. Held annually since 1969 by the student organization Cepheid Variable at the Memorial Student Center, it has grown to become one of the larger conventions in Texas. AggieCon is the first science fiction convention ever sponsored by a college or a college affiliate student organization.

Aggie Moms Club

- The oldest support group for students at Texas A&M University, represented by 110 clubs in Texas and across the United States.
- Clubs include the International MOMS Club and Quad Moms.

Aggieland

- Name for Texas A&M and the surrounding metropolitan area, Bryan–College Station, Texas. The phrase, "Welcome to Aggieland", is on the water tower in the middle of campus and one of the decks of Kyle Field. Every spring during "The Big Event", the nation's largest one-day, student-run service project, students do service-oriented activities to say thank you to Aggieland's residents.
- The school's official yearbook.

== B ==
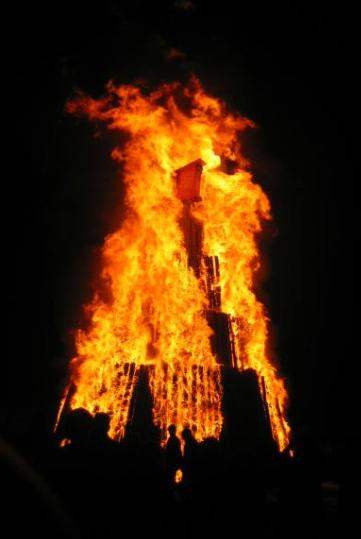
Student Bonfire, 2005

Bad Bull
Anything not in keeping with Aggie traditions or the Aggie spirit.
Ball 5
Chant done by Aggie baseball fans during games, to incite the chant, an opposing pitcher needs to throw 4 consecutive balls, the chant continues for each consecutive ball thrown until a pitch that is not a ball is thrown. the highest the chant has ever got is ball 12, meaning 11 straight balls, during a 2017 game against Mississippi State University.
Batt
Short for the school newspaper, The Battalion.

Beat the Hell Outta (abbreviated BTHO)
One of the Aggie yells. The phrase is followed by the name of the opposing team or an event or time such as finals or first year.

Aggie Bonfire (or Bonfire)
A large bonfire built before the annual college football game against The University of Texas at Austin. Bonfire symbolizes a "burning desire to beat the hell outta t.u." Aggie Bonfire at one time held the world record for the height of a bonfire at 109 ft, 10 in (33 m) tall. Due to the November 18, 1999 collapse of a Bonfire that killed 12 and injured 27, non-university sanctioned Bonfires, called Student Bonfires, are now performed off-campus.

Boot Line
During football games, Seniors line up at the south end of Kyle Field to welcome the team back after halftime.

BQ
Member of the Fightin' Texas Aggie Band, colloquially Band Queer, etymologically Band Qualified.

Bull
A member of the commandant's staff or active duty ROTC instructor.

== C ==
The Chicken
Short for a popular bar frequented by A&M students, Dixie Chicken, in the entertainment district, Northgate.

Century Singers
Texas A&M's 100-member mixed choir, the second oldest choral ensemble at the university.

Century Tree
A large oak tree that is in the middle of Academic Plaza which dates back to around 1900. Rarely pruned, its branches reach the ground. Tradition has it that if a couple walks underneath the tree together, they are destined to marry in the future. As such, it is a popular wedding proposal site. In 2011, the Texas Forest Service ranked it as a "Famous Tree of Texas".

Chig-gar-roo-gar-rem
Phrase used in the Aggie War Hymn which "is meant to replicate a train going over tracks, or a drum roll on a snare drum".

Aggie Code of Honor
Texas A&M's honor code: "Aggies do not lie, cheat, or steal, nor do they tolerate those who do." The code is similar to the Cadet Honor Code used at the United States Military Academy.

Code Maroon
Texas A&M's emergency notification System.

Corps of Cadets at fish review Fall of 2006

Corps
Short for the Texas A&M University Corps of Cadets, Texas A&M's military college program. Though Reserve Officers' Training Corps (ROTC) is mandatory for the first two years, military service is not.

Corps Trip
Annual Corps trip to a football game at an off-campus location, usually a neutral site, nominally accompanied by a parade in the city of the event.

Cut
The initial phase of Aggie Bonfire construction where students cut down logs.

CT
Member of the Corps that are not in the band. Colloquially "Corps Turd," etymologically "Cadet in Training".

== D ==
Dead (or Dead Elephant)
Senior undergraduates during their last semester. The use of the word is a senior privilege.

== E ==
Echo Taps
Ceremony that occurs when a current member of the Corps of Cadet dies or in times of national tragedy. Similar in purpose to Silver Taps.

Elephant
nickname for a senior at Texas A&M.

Elephant Walk
A tradition where the senior class walks around campus to remember the times they had at Texas A&M. When some seniors were walking around campus reliving their days in the 1920s, an underclassman noted they looked like "elephants wandering off to find a place to die" and the tradition began/name stuck.

== F ==
Fable
legendary narrative of comedy or supernatural happenings effected by an Aggie with unique Promethean and/or comedic consequences

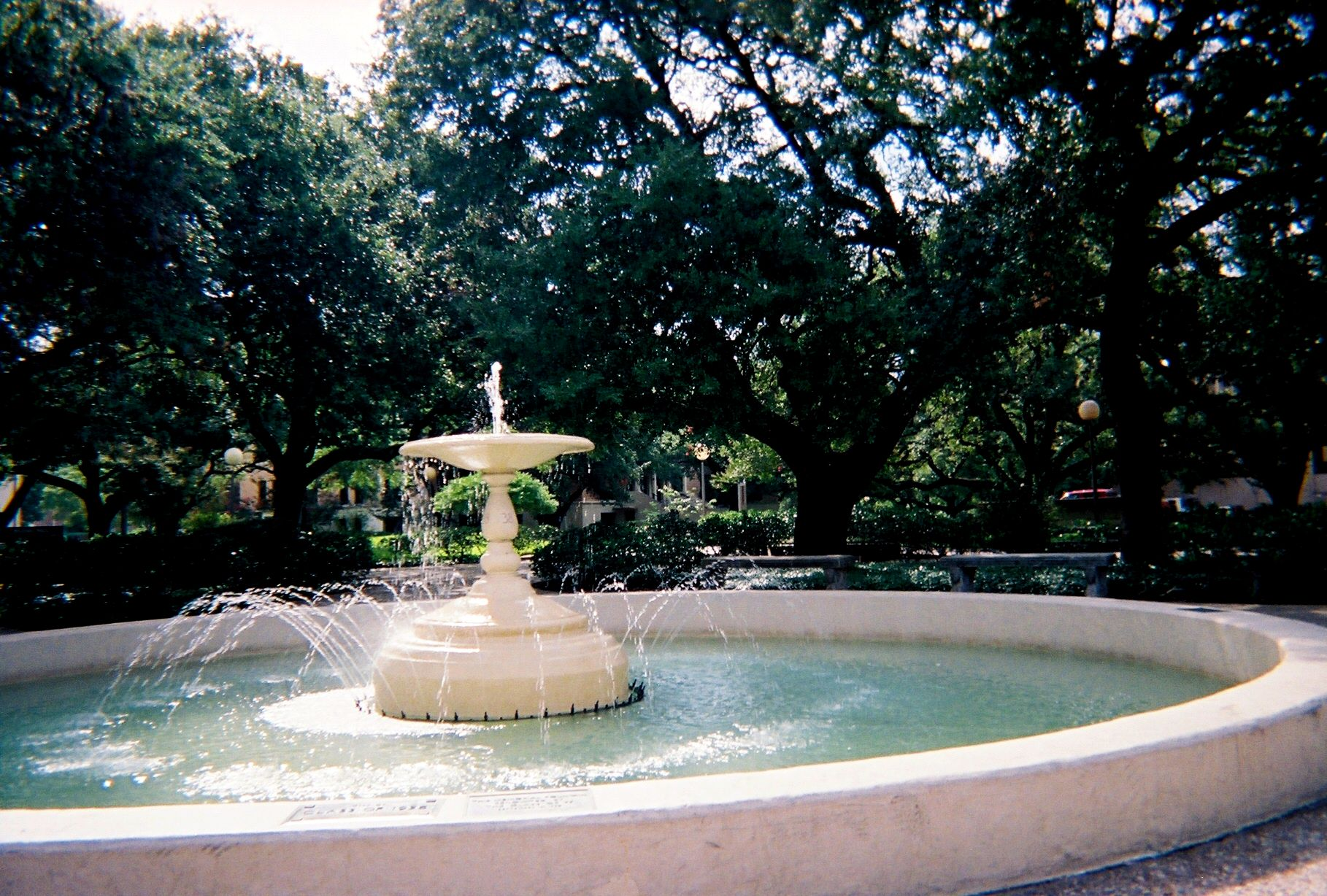
Fish Pond, a fountain on the Texas A&M campus

"Farmers fight"
Phrase used in several Aggie Yells. "Farmers" comes from the original nickname of the sports teams associated with Texas A&M. "Aggies" officially replaced the nickname in 1949, but the word "farmers" remains a part of Aggie traditions.

Fightin' Texas Aggie
Common prefix used for things related to A&M. For example, the Fightin' Texas Aggie Band.

Fightin' Texas Aggie Band
Official band of Texas A&M since 1894. Named for a discontinued tradition of physical combat among members to claim the title of Drum Major, members are cadets in the Corps and comprise an entire major unit of the Corps. The band is most noted for its straight-line military marching and intricate close quarters drills.

Final Review
The annual spring ceremonial inspection of The Corps of Cadets gather at Simpson Drill Field. Graduating seniors pass their command duties to the junior officers.

Fish
A freshman student. In the Corps, the term is used in place of freshmen cadets' first names and is always written in lowercase, e.g. "fish Jones."

Fish Camp
An optional student-led four-day retreat for incoming freshmen held before the student's fall semester that introduces them to the traditions of Texas A&M University. Transfer students can attend a separate retreat called "T-Camp", and first time Texas A&M students coming in spring semester can attend "Howdy Camp".

Fish Pond
A fountain on the Texas A&M campus located in front of Sbisa Dining Center.

Fish Spurs
A Corps of Cadet tradition where freshmen cadets add bottle caps to the back of their shoes before the Arkansas football game in a fashion similar to the spurs horse riders use. Originally, this was done before the SMU football game as a way to "spur" their opponent. Due to athletic conference changes, A&M has not always played SMU. Thus this tradition has now been switched to before the Southwest Classic against Arkansas.

Former Student
Aggie graduates refer to themselves as "former students" rather than alumni because not all Aggies graduated due to military needs during the World Wars. Another reason why Aggies use "former students" is that it is felt that "alumni" implies that graduates are "ex-Aggies". Aggies believe in the concept "once an Aggie, always an Aggie", and thus "alumni" would not be appropriate. The Association of Former Students is the university's equivalent of an alumni association.

Fall Orientation Week (FOW)
Mandatory first week in the Corps just before school starts in the Fall semester for incoming freshmen cadets or fish.

Frog
A Transfer student that joins the corps and condenses their whole freshmen year into one semester, usually to stay on track with their graduation date. Used as a verb as well they will "frog" up to the class aligned with their graduation date. So a sophomore by credits will "frog" to be a sophomore second semester.

"From the outside looking in you can't understand it, and from the inside looking out you can't explain it"
Phrase used to describe the difficulty outsiders have understanding Texas A&M culture, and Aggies have articulating their passion for Texas A&M.

== G ==
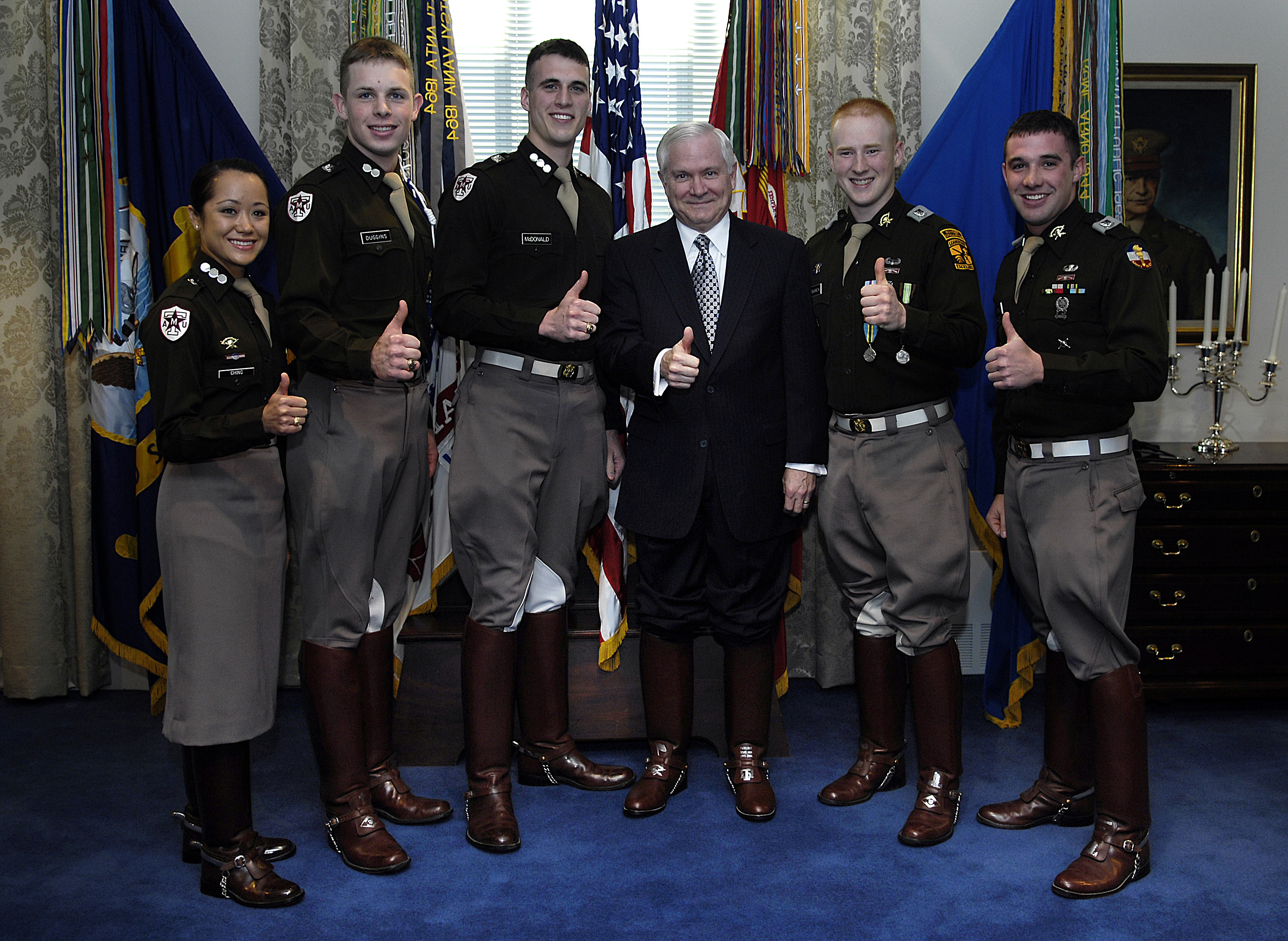
US Secretary of Defense Robert Gates along with senior cadets from the Corps of Cadets give the "gig 'em" sign at the Pentagon.

Gig 'em
Both a saying and the thumbs up hand gesture of all Texas A&M University current and former students as sign of affiliation. Gig 'em also is the name of an Aggie yell. This hand signal tradition began at a 1930 Midnight Yell Practice held before the football game against the Texas Christian University Horned Frogs. In an attempt to excite the crowd, Pinky Downs, a 1906 Texas A&M graduate and member of the school's Board of Regents, asked the crowd "What are we going to do to those Horned Frogs?" Using a term for frog hunting long used by Texas A&M in connection with the TCU rivalry, he answered his own question, "Gig 'em, Aggies!" and demonstrated how creating the hand signal which became the first in the Southwest Conference.

Good Bull
Anything that conforms to the traditions of Texas A&M. Many Ags also use this term to signify approval of virtually anything.

G.R.I.N.D.
A motivational acronym formed from the words Grit, Relentless Effort, Integrity, Now, and Dependability, coined by the head football coach Mike Elko.

Grodes
The jeans and T-shirts worn by students who worked on Aggie Bonfire. Grodes were typically not washed until Bonfire burned, if ever.

== H ==
"Highway 6 runs both ways"
A contractarian argument used in response to complaints made about Texas A&M, meaning that those who do not like the university are free to leave. Highway 6 refers to the major north–south highway leading to the Bryan–College Station area from Houston and Dallas, two hometowns of the most students at A&M.

Hiss (or horse laugh)
Rather than "booing", Aggies "hiss" to express disapproval. Aggies are not supposed to boo as a "sign of class", and are not supposed to hiss a fellow Ag. Hissing is a part of a yell called a horse laugh, and usually is accompanied with a hand signal that consists of one's fingers open and palms clasped together, shaken backward and forward.

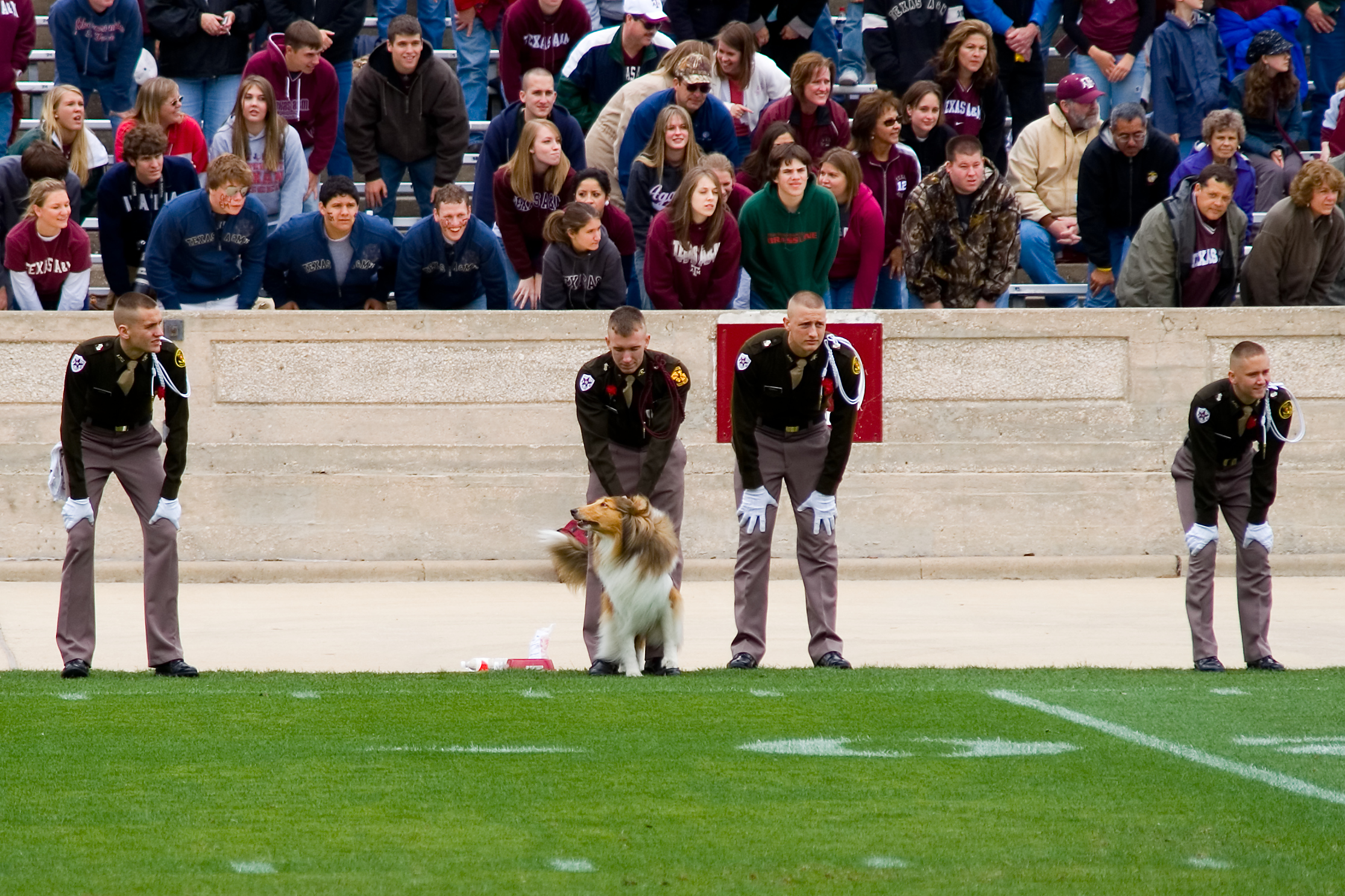
Spectators and cadets "humping it" at the 2007 spring football exhibition game

Howdy
Texas A&M University's official greeting. Students are encouraged to greet everyone they pass on campus with a smile and a howdy. Howdy is the preferred method for a speaker to get a large group's attention, as the members of the group are expected to return the "Howdy" back to the speaker.

Hullabaloo, Caneck! Caneck!
Beginning phrase of the Aggie War Hymn. Hullabaloo is also the name of a dorm on the Northside of the Texas A&M campus.

Hump it (or Humping it)
During yells, Aggies lean forward and place their hands on their knees to maximize volume and the amount of air displaced. The stance forces the diaphragm to assist the lungs.

== J ==
Junction Boys
"Survivors" of Texas A&M Aggies football coach Paul "Bear" Bryant's 10-day summer camp in Junction, Texas, beginning 1 September 1954. The ordeal has achieved legendary status and has become the subject of a 2001 book The Junction Boys by Jim Dent and a television movie with the same name produced by ESPN.
Johnny Football
Nickname of the Aggie Heisman Trophy winning quarterback Johnny Manziel.

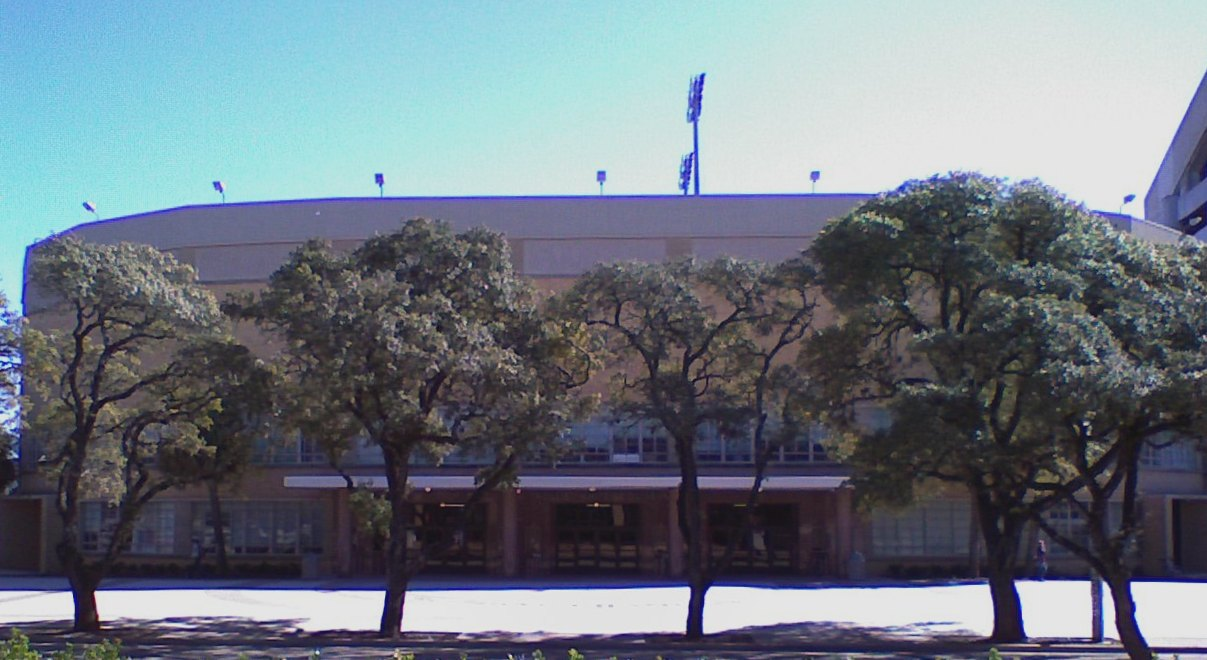
G. Rollie White Coliseum, also known as Jollie Rollie

Aggie jokes
Jokes used against Texas A&M and Aggies, similar to jokes used against ethnic minorities usually with a connotation of a lack of intelligence or unsophistication.

Jollie Rollie
Nickname of the G. Rollie White Coliseum. The building was demolished in 2013. The building was also nicknamed the "Holler House on the Brazos".

== K ==
Kyle Field
Texas A&M's football stadium. Named for Edwin Kyle, a professor of Agriculture who partitioned off part of his fields for athletic use and obtained seating for the games. Also known as "The House that Johnny Built".

== L ==
Load
The second phase of Aggie Bonfire construction where the newly cut logs are transported back to the Bonfire site.

== M ==
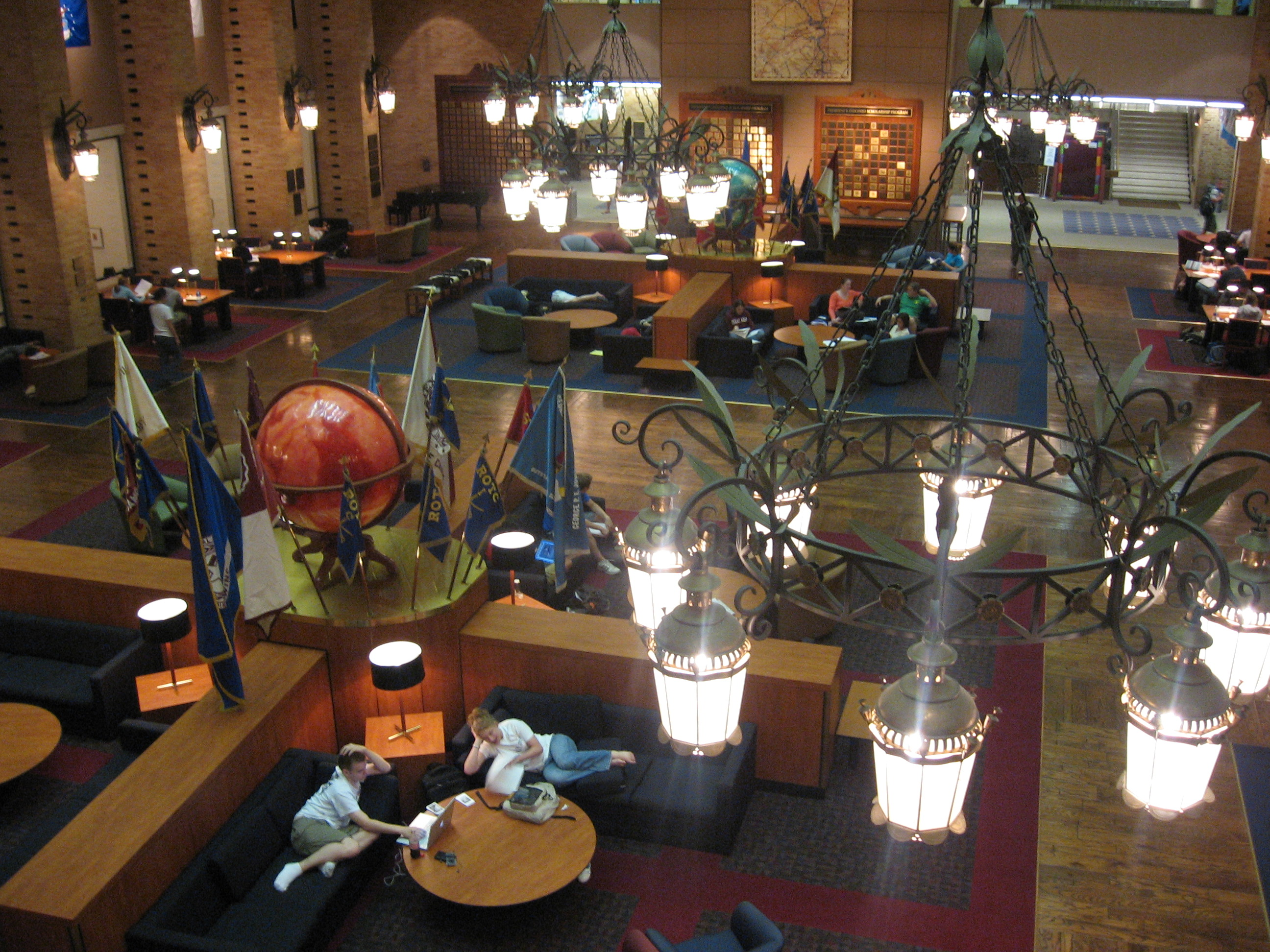
The flag room of the Memorial Student Center, also known as the MSC

March to the Brazos
A 18-mile (30 km) Corps march which starts from the dorms in the Quadrangle, through Main Campus and West Campus to Texas A&M's Animal Science Teaching, Research & Extension Complex (ASTREC) near the east bank of the Brazos River. The event is the largest and most successful student-led fundraiser for the March of Dimes in the United States.

Maroon
The official color of Texas A&M along with white. The university's Pantone color is 7421C. The official RGB value is (Hex #500000).

Mug down
Kissing one's date during yell practices and football games (the latter after each Aggie score). For the campus satirical publication, see The Mugdown .

Muster
Tradition on 21 April, San Jacinto Day where Aggies meet locally all over the world meet honor those Aggies who have died in the previous year.

Memorial Student Center (MSC)
Texas A&M's student activity center and living memorial, dedicated to all Aggies who have given or will give their lives in service of their country.

== N ==
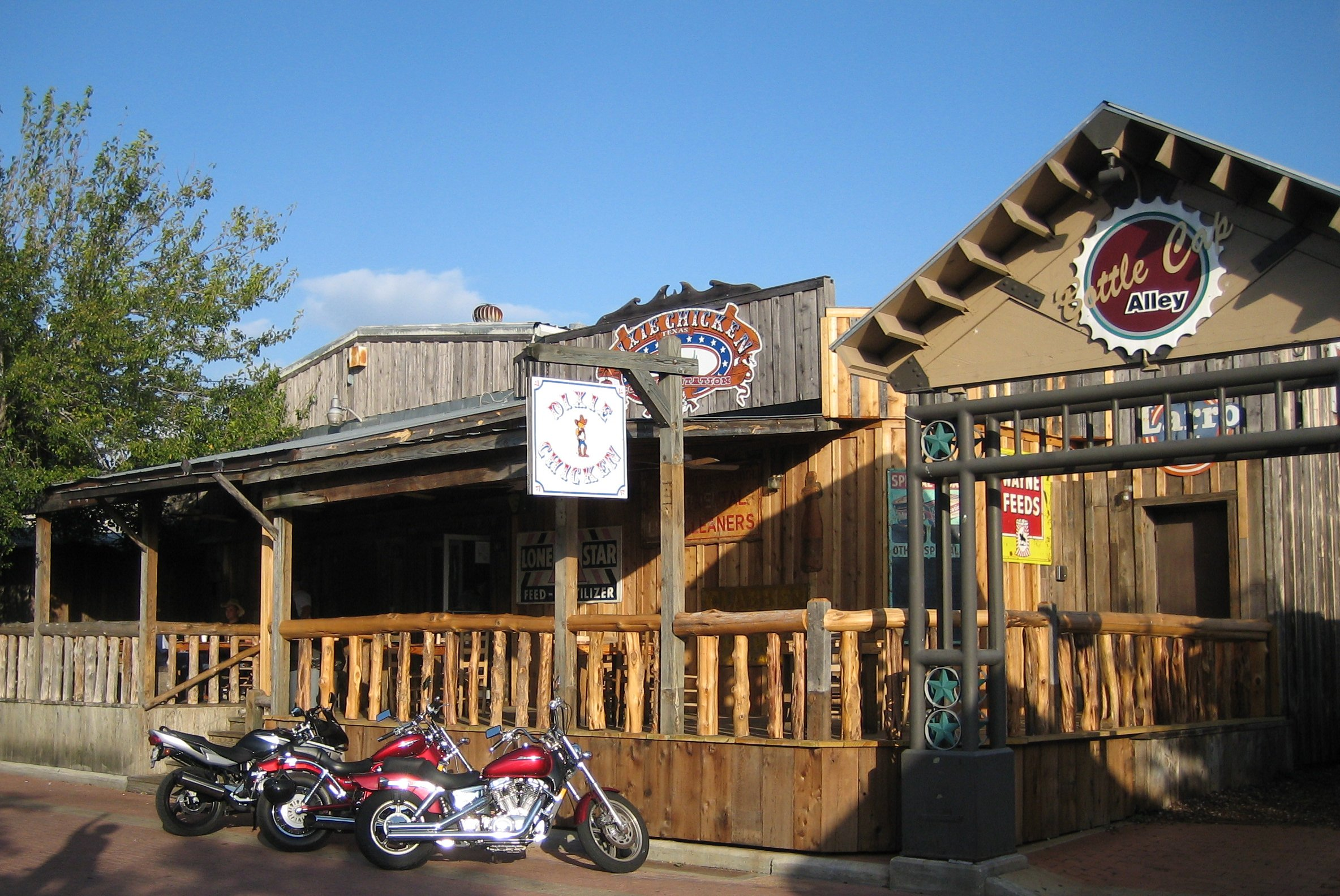
Dixie Chicken back entrance on Northgate

New Army
Derogatory term referring to Texas A&M's current state and student body and changes that have taken place and/or attitudes of newer Aggies.

Non-reg
A student who is not in the Corps of Cadets.

Northgate
Entertainment district–mainly targeting A&M students–located northwest of the Texas A&M campus.

Northside
Collection of residence halls on campus closest to Northgate.

== O ==
"Off the wood"
During sporting events, Texas A&M students get off the bleachers when players on any team are injured; a throwback to times when the bleachers (now metal) were made of wood.

Old Ag
Synonymous for a former Texas A&M student.

Ol' Army (or Old Army)
Sentimental term for a fond view of Texas A&M's past or "the good old days."

Ol' Lady (or Old Lady)
Corps of Cadet member's roommate. As freshmen, cadets are not allowed to refer to their personal living space as a "room", but instead, refer to it as a "hole". Since freshmen are not allowed to have a "room", they cannot have a "roommate" and refer to this person as an "Ol' Lady". While not required, many upperclassmen continue the tradition through their senior year.

Ol' Rock (or Rock)
A character who is meant to represent the prototypical Aggie used in the fables told at yell practices. Another tradition during these fables is for the yell leader telling the fable to mention his class's graduating year in the fable, when this happens, members of that class do their class wildcat.

Ol' Sarge
An unofficial mascot of A&M that is portrayed as a tough-looking corps drill sergeant.

Aggie Habitat for Humanity mural at Camp Hope, St Bernard Parish, Louisiana. This is an example of the "other education".

Other education
What Aggie students learn outside the classroom through extracurricular activities and through living life.

== P ==
Parsons Mounted Cavalry (or the Cav)
Cavalry unit of the Corps of Cadets, the only mounted ROTC unit in the United States

Pass back
A hand signal, initiated by the Yell Leaders, which informs students which yell to do next.

Passdown
An object of some significance that is given from an upperclassman to an underclassman, and is often passed through several generations of students in the Corps.

Pisshead
A nickname for a sophomore, primarily in the Corps of Cadets. Refers to the stern demeanor of sophomore cadets in training their freshmen.

Poor Aggies
Disparaging term used to taunt Aggies after an athletic loss from opponents.

Pots
Hard hats worn by Aggie Bonfire builders. The color of a student's pot identified their role in bonfire construction.

Privilege (SP, JP, ZP)
A ranking system based on one's class year which determines what traditions an Aggie student is allowed to perform. The privilege levels are, SP, JP, and ZPs: sophomore, junior, and senior (Zip) privileges, respectively. Freshmen have "fish privileges". In the Corps, one's privilege level has an enormous effect on a cadet's lifestyle. Some rules like wildcatting extend to non-regs.

Pull out
The act of using a privileged word or wildcat not available to one’s class year, most commonly when sophomores say “Whoop!” before they are authorized to do so. Traditionally, underclassmen who pull out without permission may be chased by upperclassmen and required to push. Pull Out Day is a sophomore class tradition held near the end of the spring semester when sophomores are officially allowed to pull out together for the first time without punishment.
Push
- A form of punishment consisting of pushups, especially after pulling out. Cadets in the Corps typically do a "class set" of push-ups, one for each year of their class. The Class of 1945 did only 45 pushups, and while for a few years cadets did "old Army class sets" (counting from 1900 and not resetting at 2000), the Class of 2021 now does 21.
- The last phase of Aggie Bonfire construction, where students work around the clock in rotating shifts to finish stacking the logs.

== Q ==
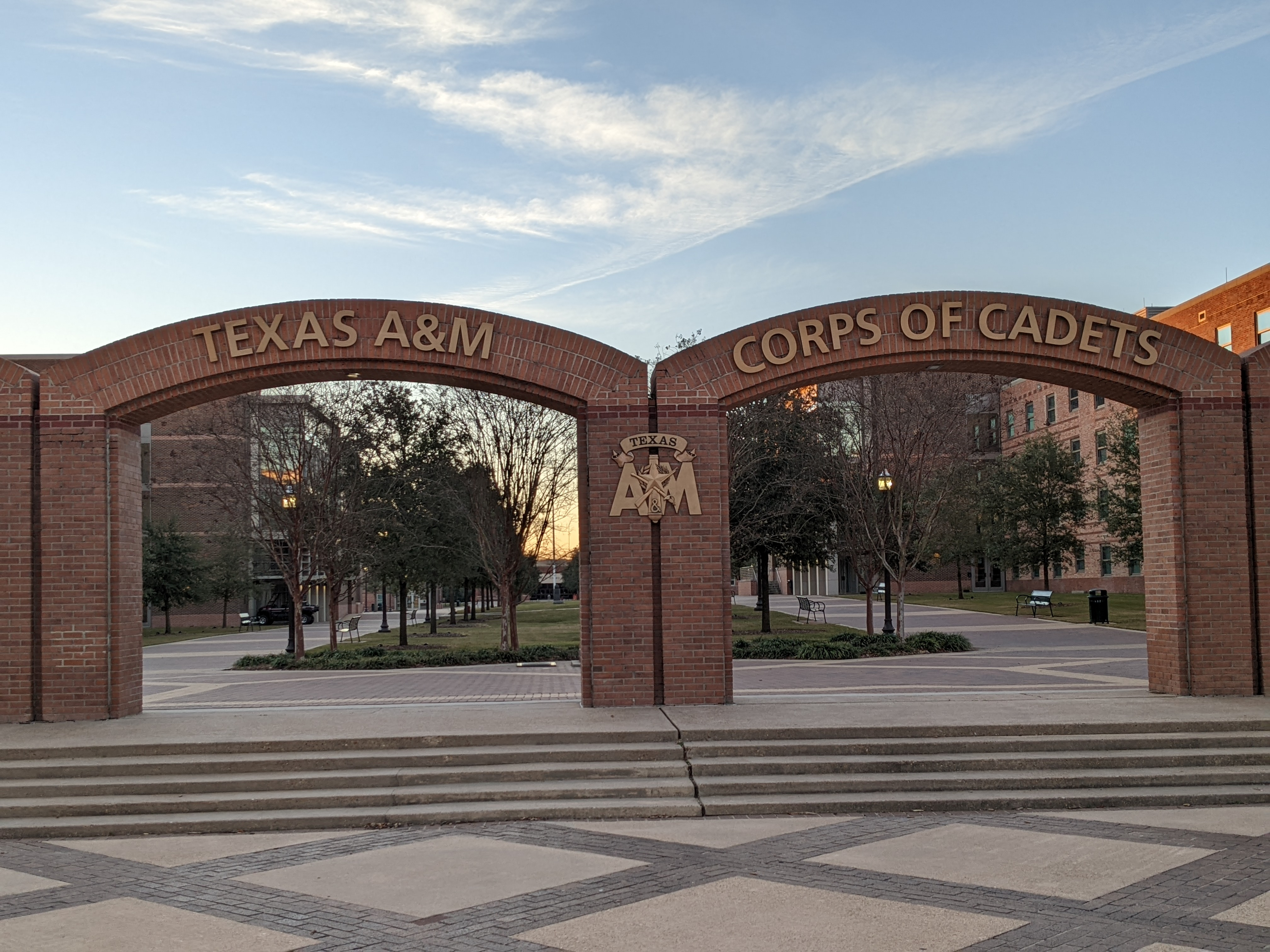
Corps Arches in front of "the Quad"

The Quad
Location of the dormitories of the Corps of Cadets.

== R ==
Ram
Demerit issued to a cadet by either a ranking cadet or a bull for a major rule violation.

RAggies
Aggie baseball fans known for their heckling/antics.

Red Ass
Students who closely follow the Aggie traditions and rules to the best of their ability. Term originated from cadets wearing a baseball belt under their uniforms to keep their shirts tight.

Reed Arena
The university's arena.

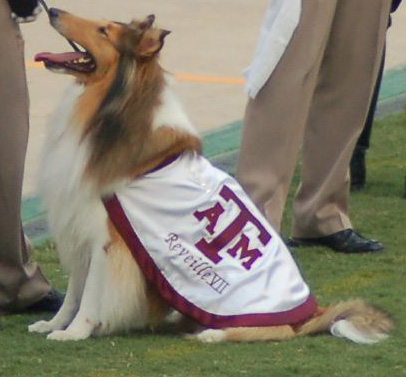
Reveille VII at a football game

Reed Rowdies
Official fan club of Texas A&M basketball teams.

Reveille
The Texas A&M mascot, a purebred American collie. Reveille is the highest-ranking member of the Corps of Cadets and serves as a cadet general, a rank granted by the US Army in World War II.

Ring Dance
A spring semester dance similar in function to a prom. The dance marks the time when seniors can turn their ring around to allow it to be read by others when their palm is facing down.
Ring dunk
A non-school sanctioned tradition performed after a student receives an Aggie Ring; usually involves chugging a pitcher of beer, or a non-alcoholic substitute, with their Aggie Ring in the bottom then catching the ring in their teeth.

Roll Call for the Absent
A part of the Aggie Muster tradition, commemorating alumni and current student who died during the past year. Reminiscent of a roll call where attendance is taken, alumni, family, and friends answer "here" in memory of a deceased Aggie when their name is "called." Aggies may also say "here" to honor a fallen Aggie outside the Muster ceremony.

Ross Volunteers
The ceremonial honor company of Texas A&M University, and the official honor guard for the Governor of Texas

== S ==
"Saw Varsity's Horns Off"
A verse from the Aggie War Hymn, it refers to defeating the Texas Longhorns, who use a Longhorn steer as their mascot.

Sbisa
Sbisa Dining Hall is on North campus near most of the north campus dorms. It was opened in 1912 and named after Bernard Sbisa who was in charge of feeding the corps during the late 19th century. It is frequented by many freshman and is one of two dining halls on campus.

Sea Aggies
Students or alumni who spent time at the school's maritime facilities/branch campus at Texas A&M University at Galveston.

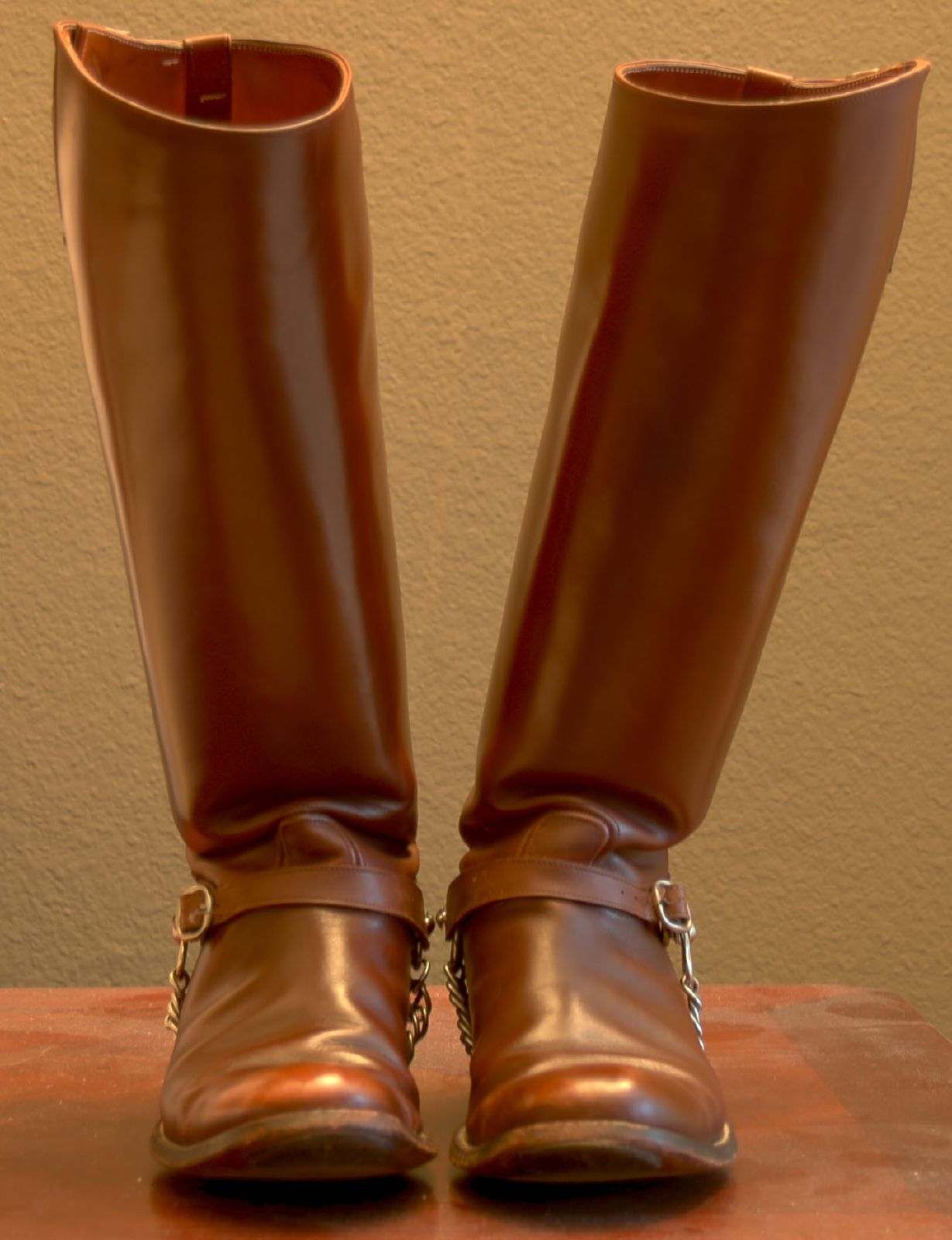
Senior boots

Senior Boots
Distinctive brown leather boots worn by Corps seniors, or Zips.

Serge Butt
A nickname for a junior. Refers to the "serge" material used in making pants for junior cadets pre-1960. Usually abbreviated as just "butts."

Singing Cadets
An all-male choir, one of the three Choral Activities choirs at A&M, called the "Voice of Aggieland". While Corps members may join the Singing Cadets, one does not have to be a member of the Corps to join the Singing Cadets.

Silver Taps
A ceremony, held monthly, to honor all enrolled students who died in the previous month.

"Sit down bus driver"
An Aggie Yell used in athletic events to drive the opposing team's coaches to get the game moving when they are arguing with an official or otherwise holding up the game. "Bus driver" refers to the fact that coaches used to drive the buses for road games.

Southside
Residence halls on the far southeast portion of campus.

Aggie Spirit (or Spirit of Aggieland)
Describes the unity and devotion Aggies have for their school and to each other. "The Spirit" also refers to the school song, "The Spirit of Aggieland".
Spirit of '02
an M1902 field gun found during the construction of the 1974 bonfire. Fully restored, it is fired when the Aggie football team scores a touchdown.
Stack
The third phase of Aggie Bonfire construction, where students would wire the logs together in their final shape.

Sully (or Sul Ross)
Short for former Texas A&M President Lawrence Sullivan Ross. Modern usage generally refers to the prominent statue of him on campus, often covered in pennies from students as a "good luck" tradition.

== T ==
TAMC (or Texas AMC)
Refers to the university's former name the "Agricultural and Mechanical College of Texas". While the institution has been renamed Texas A&M University with the initials TAMU, the initials AMC are still used in several Aggie traditions including Aggie yells and the Spirit of Aggieland."

Tea-sip (or t-sip)
A student of Texas A&M's archrival, The University of Texas at Austin. The term is intended to be derogatory (the origin being that while Aggies were off fighting wars, students of UT Austin were "sipping tea" at home).

TexAgs
An independent Texas A&M website, one of the largest collegiate independent websites in the country. "TexAgs" has been used colloquially in relationship to the use of the site's internet forum.

t.u.
What Aggies call the University of Texas at Austin, their primary rival school to Texas A&M University. The term is intended to be derogatory. Aggies maintain that UT is a university "in" Texas not the university "of" Texas. The t.u. therefore stands for "texas university", with the lowercase letters being an added insult. This verbiage is prominently used in the opening line of the War Hymn.

== U ==
Uncover
Said as a reminder for people to take off their hat during yells or the singing of 'The Spirit of Aggieland'

== W ==
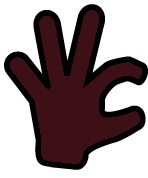
Hand sign for the Wrecking Crew

Wag/Waggie
Portmandeau of "Woman Aggie". A term referring to female cadets in the Corps. Originally intended to be derogatory, as of recent, it is increasingly used as term of camaraderie and endearment.

War Hymn
Texas A&M's equivalent of a fight song.

Whip Out (or Whipping Out)
A traditional greeting within the Corps of Cadets where underclassmen introduce themselves to upperclassman.

White
The second official Texas A&M color. White Out is a basketball tradition. Unlike football games, where Aggie fans wear Maroon, the basketball crowds wear white.

Whoop
An exclamation of approval and excitement, especially used at the end of a yell. This is a junior and senior privilege.
Wildcat
A vocal sound accompanied by a hand motion made after an Aggie yell. Each undergraduate class year has a different wildcat based on seniority. Aggie Wildcats by class:

- Freshmen: Raise both hands while making a continuous “AAAAA” sound.
- Sophomores: Form pistols with both hands and wave them in front of your torso five times, saying “A” each time.
- Juniors: Perform the sophomore pistols three times, then cross fingers in a gun shape downward and “Whoop.”
- Seniors: Perform one sophomore pistol, then raise hands in a gun shape, cross legs and “Whoop.”

Women's Chorus
Texas A&M's all-female choir, known as the "Finest Singing Women in Aggieland."

Wrecking Crew
Name given to defenses of the football team. The term became popular in the 80s and 90s. While the term is trademarked by the university, many fans, coaches, and sports analysts feel that recent Aggie defenses have not "earned" the title.

== Y ==
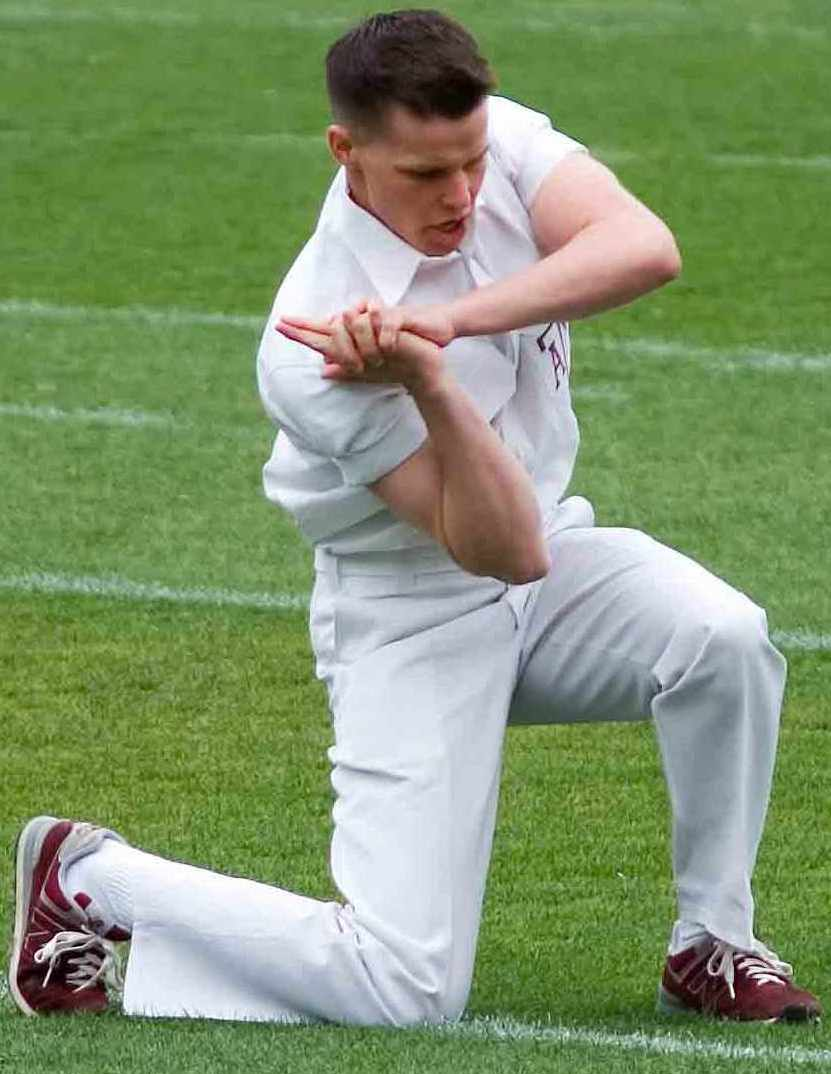
A yell leader doing the senior wildcat on the field at a football game. Yell leaders do this signal at the end of each yell either kneeling (as shown) or standing with a foot tucked behind the opposite knee.

Aggie Yells
Synchronized yells done at Aggie sporting events.

Yell Leaders
Texas A&M's equivalent of cheerleaders – These elected students, three seniors and two juniors, lead the student body in synchronized yells throughout all sporting events and yell practices. While all yell leaders on the main campus have been men, a woman has served as one at the school's branch campus in Galveston. Note that the university has an all female competitive cheerleading squad called Texas A&M Cheer Squad, which has won several NCA National Championships, including the 2023 event where they got the second highest score of the competition. This cheer squad does not perform at athletic events whereas yell leaders do.

Yell practice
A Texas A&M event that is similar to a pep rally. The most notable yell practices, Midnight Yell, occurs the night before home football games.

== Z ==
Zip (or Zipper-Head)
A nickname for a senior, named so for the black and gold braid on the garrison caps of seniors in the Corps of Cadets, which resembles a zipper.
