= Curtain Call For Clifford =

Three-act comedy play by William Dalzell and Newt Mitzman

Curtain Call For Clifford is a three-act comedy play by William Dalzell and Newt Mitzman. It is published by Samuel French, Inc. While the play has existed for a number of years, it is predominantly performed in schools and community theaters.

== Plot ==
Clifford Mumford is a senior at Rockwood High School. A quiet, nerd-like student, Clifford has had a crush on Donna Bratton, the popular girlfriend of the star-jock, Grant "Biff" Reese. While the students at Rockwood love Biff, he is, at the same time, nasty to the sweet Donna, and a bully. Donna is almost always cast as the lead of the schools play, and this year will be no exception. However, Clifford, who saw last year's show every night of its performance, is accidentally cast as the lead opposite Donna in this years show, The Ghost of Blackborn Manor, by the cooky director Eda Troutliver. Eda has had a crush on Harry DeWilde, the quiet, idiosyncratic science teacher and producer of the play, who is completely oblivious to Eda's love for him.

== Summary ==
The first act begins at the school Pep Rally hosted by Mr. DeWilde, auditions for the show take place, and Clifford reads with Donna. It is also revealed that Clifford will have to kiss Donna, much to Biff's dismay. The second act shows rehearsals for the show, which are going terribly. Ms. Troutliver is having a breakdown while the cast struggles to rehearse the play. Biff threatens Clifford after seeing his kiss with Donna. In the third act we find that Biff has kidnapped Clifford, in an attempt to sabotage the show. Clifford makes it to the show, so Biff, in turn, kidnaps Andy, a student playing Wilkins the Butler, and comes on stage as Wilkins. Ms. Troutliver and Mr. DeWilde chase after Biff, ultimately ending in Clifford beating him up and Mr. DeWilde dragging his unconscious body off stage as the play goes on. Clifford then gives Donna his pin, becoming her boyfriend.

== Characters ==
- Clifford L. Mumford
- Donna Bratton
- Ms. Eda Troutliver
- Mr. Harry DeWilde
- Flooper Bushman
- Joyce
- Sidney
- Andy
- Jerome
- Biff Reese
- Students of Rockwood High School
