= Midnight Yell Practice =

Pep rally event at Texas A&M University

Midnight Yell Practice, known locally as Midnight Yell or Yell Practice, is a tradition at Texas A&M University. Midnight Yell is similar to a pep rally. On the night before each home football game, Midnight Yell takes place in Kyle Field at midnight; two nights before each away game, a Yell Practice (not at midnight) is held near the Quadrangle on the south side of campus. At midnight on the night before an away game Midnight Yell is held in or near the opponent's city.

Besides exciting the crowd, Midnight Yell introduces the student body to any new yells and to practice changes to existing yells. All yell practices are led by the Yell Leaders, a set of five students who are elected to one-year terms by the student body.

== History ==
Yell Practice began in 1913, while A&M was still an all-male military school. Several companies would gather together to "learn heartily the old time pep."

The first Midnight Yell was held in 1932. Two freshmen asked the senior Yell Leaders to hold a midnight practice so that students would be motivated for the upcoming football game against archrival Texas. The Yell Leaders said that they couldn't authorize a Yell Practice at that late hour. However, they liked the idea, and suggested that they just might "show up" at the campus YMCA Building that evening around midnight. The Fightin' Texas Aggie Band met them at the YMCA, and soon the bulk of the student body had gathered. The cadets used railroad flares to light the event, and a tradition was born.

In September 2022, the tradition received national media coverage after the Aggies' football loss to App State Mountaineers. The yell practice video shot before Texas A&M's 17-14 loss to App State was called "embarrassing" and "cringeworthy". The clips appeared to vanish from the internet after Texas A&M took down video clips on Twitter claiming copyright, but were soon reposted.

== Modern tradition ==
=== Home games ===
Drum Majors of the Fightin' Texas Aggie Band light their torches to lead the Fightin' Texas Aggie Band over to Kyle Field for Midnight Yell Practice.

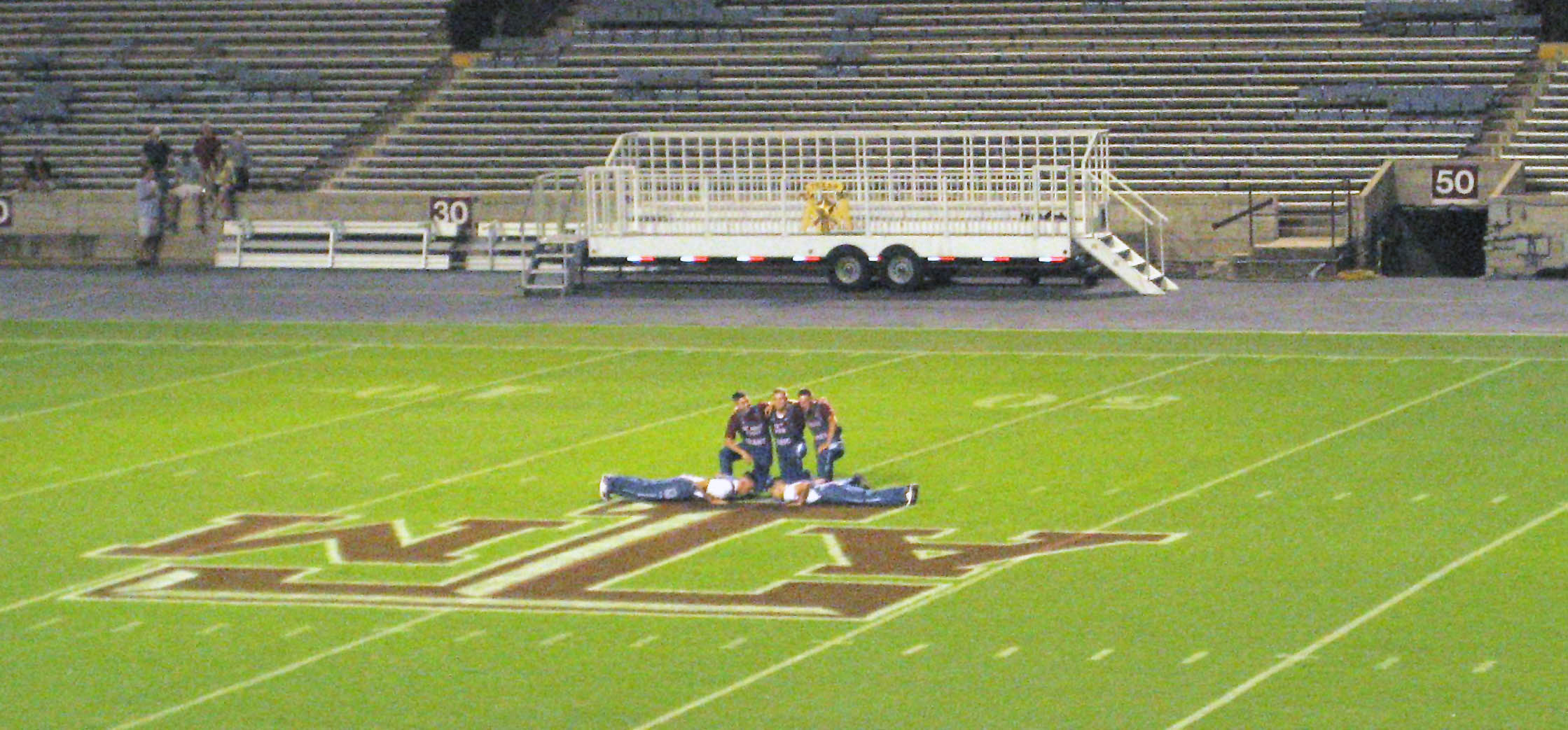
Senior Yell Leaders watch intently as the Junior Yell Leaders perform pushups while the Fightin' Texas Aggie Band plays a tune

Since that first Midnight Yell, the event has been held on the night before each home football game. The Fightin' Texas Aggie Band and the five Yell Leaders lead a parade from the Quadrangle, where the Corps dorms are located. Students and alumni line the route from the Quadrangle to Kyle Field, falling into line once those in front of them have passed. Students and alumni gather in the student section of the stands. At midnight, the yell practice begins. The Corps Juniors used to guard Kyle Field all night against students from other schools who may try to pull pranks the night before the game. This job has since been taken over by University Police, but only the Corps Juniors are allowed to stand on the track around the field in recognition of this tradition.

In a departure from their starched white game-day uniforms, at Midnight Yell the Yell Leaders typically wear painted denim overalls and T-shirts. With the senior Yell Leaders looking on, the junior Yell Leaders assemble at midfield and begin doing pushups. The pushups last for approximately nine minutes (3 songs played by the Aggie Band about 3 minutes each). When the juniors are finished, Reveille, the Texas A&M mascot, is escorted onto the field.

The five Yell Leaders then arrange themselves in front of the stands and begin leading the yells. All yells are coordinated using hand signals. When the yell is ready to begin, the head Yell Leader gives a signal and the crowd "humps it," with every person leaning forward to maximize the volume of their voices.

During the Yell Practice, the crowd, which generally numbers 20,000 to 25,000 people, is led in the yells. The school songs "Aggie War Hymn" and "Spirit of Aggieland" are sung, the Yell Leaders will also tell two fables about how the Aggies are going to beat their opponent the next day.

At one point during the night the stadium lights are turned off and, traditionally, Aggies are supposed to kiss their dates (called "mugging down"). This relates to another student tradition: "When One Aggie Scores, All Aggies Score." When the Aggies score a touchdown, safety, or field goal, everyone in the student body who has brought a date to the game kisses their date.

If no date is present, single students light their cigarette lighters, commonly referred to as "flicking your Bic," to make it easier for two dateless people to find each other in the dark.

=== Away games ===
If the game is an away game, a yell called an Arch (or Grove) Yell is held on campus the Thursday before the game, and a Midnight Yell is held in a location in the away city. For example, if the annual game against the University of Texas is held in Austin the Midnight Yell is held on the steps of the Texas State Capitol. Grove yells were held at The Grove, an outdoor theater near the MSC which was torn down in 2003. Since then, they have been held in front of the twelve arches that mark the entrance to the Corps of Cadets quad area. Arch Yells are usually at 7 PM, the attendance is much smaller (usually only the Corps of Cadets) but the tradition of "mugging down" is still followed.

=== After-game Yell Practices ===
A Victory Yell Practice after a close win over Oklahoma State in 2007

After a victorious home football game, the Yell Leaders are tackled by the freshmen in the Corps and thrown into Fish Pond. Afterwards, the Aggie Band meets up with them and an informal yell practice ensues on the steps of the YMCA building. Should the Aggies run out of time (that is, lose) in a football game, a yell practice is held in the stands "to display the continuing support for the Aggie team and to prepare for the next game."
