= March to the Brazos =

March of Dimes fundraiser

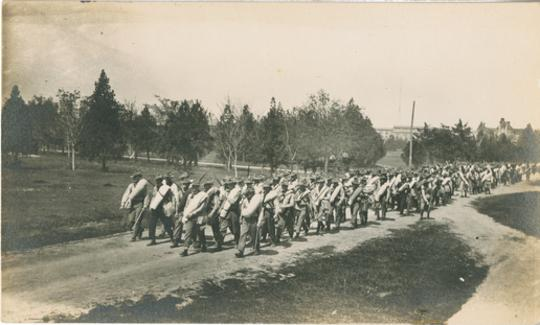
March to the Brazos in 1910

March to the Brazos was the largest and most successful student-led fundraiser for the March of Dimes in the United States, and raised over $1.5 million between 1977 and 2007. The annual event is organized and comprised completely of members of the Corps of Cadets at Texas A&M University. In the spring semester, the cadets conduct a 18 miles (30 km) round-trip road march starting from their dorms in the Quadrangle, through the main campus and the west campus to Texas A&M's Animal Science Teaching, Research & Extension Complex (ASTREC) near the east bank of the Brazos River. After the first leg of the march, cadets participate in various competitions (tug-of-war, relay races, etc.), eat lunch, and unofficially transfer ranks for the following school year. The day concludes with the march back under the leadership of the next class, while the class of the current year rides buses back to campus.

== History ==
On April 1, 1908, the cadets of Texas A&M College—who had been on strike in protest of Henry Hill Harrington, president of the college—did not attend class on that day, as it was traditionally treated as a holiday by the students. This action, along with other April Fool's Day pranks, was becoming a little too regular an occurrence for the Commandant. The next year, the Commandant issued General Order No. 27, and began what became known as the “Hike to the Brazos.” This eventually was dubbed the “March to the Brazos.” The hike originated in 1909 and was held March 31 through April 1 to generally keep the cadets from playing April Fool's jokes on each other and their instructors. This tradition was held annually until 1912 at which point it was discontinued.

March to the Brazos was revived in 1977 when cadet leadership saw the natural tie between March to the Brazos and the March of Dimes. This special partnership was seen as a way to build Corps spirit and also benefit a worthwhile charity. From 1977 through 2003, the event raised a total of $1.3 million, with $130,000 raised in 2003 alone. March to the Brazos is the largest and most successful student-led fundraiser for the March of Dimes in the United States.

== Charity work ==
Each school year, the Corps raises money through door-to-door collections (residents and businesses), Fill-the-Boot (senior cadet boot) collections at local businesses, and donations from friends and family members (locally and in their hometowns). Additional efforts include doing a mail out to cadet referrals, involving former students, and engaging corporate sponsors. During the 28 years from 1977 to 2004, the Corps has raised over $1.5 million for the March of Dimes, whose mission is to improve the health of babies by preventing birth defects and infant mortality. In 2005, cadets raised just over $142,041.37. In 2019, it was decided by the cadets that the funds they raised prior to March to Brazos would go to local charities that benefit the Brazos Valley community. Those charities included the local Habitat for Humanity, Brazos Valley Food Bank, Twin City Mission, and Scotty's House.
