= Pep rally =

Gathering held at a school or college sporting event

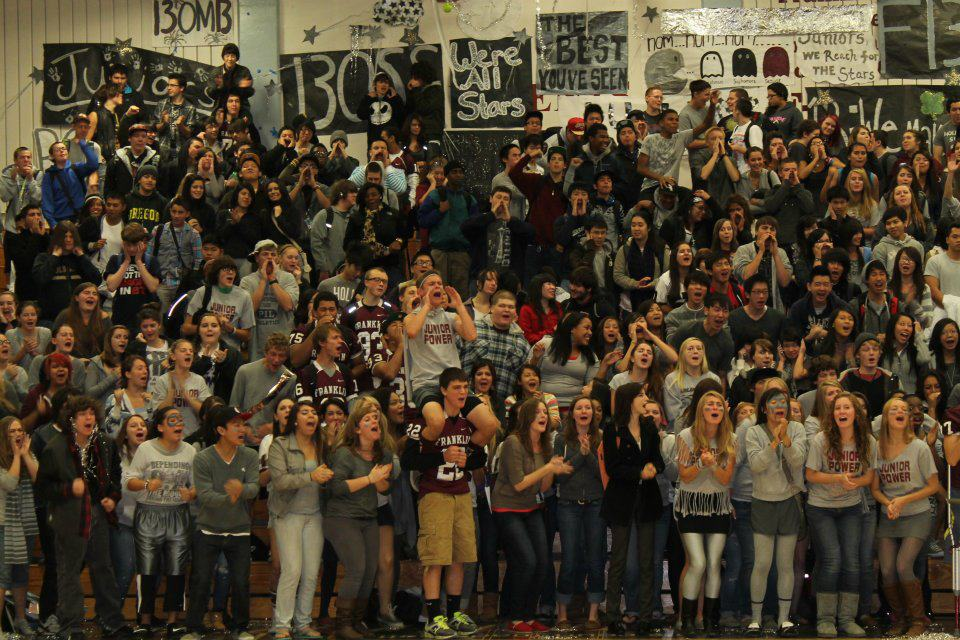
A group of students at their high school pep assembly.

A pep rally, pep assembly or pep session is a gathering of people, typically students of middle school, high school, and college age, before a school sporting event. The purpose of such a gathering is to encourage school spirit and to support members of the team. This is often done by wearing school colors or chanting school cheers. It is generally seen as an American and Canadian phenomenon, used to create hype before a sporting event.

A pep rally often occurs before homecoming, prom, or even regional or national games for the school. It is usually held inside a school gym or other large sporting arena in the area. In an attempt to boost enthusiasm before an event, pep rallies are usually very loud and energetic. They are used to encourage the team, enhance their spirits, and help them gain the confidence to perform their best by showing the school's support.

Often, businesses or speakers such a town mayor, law enforcement, or motivational speaker will come to promote their business or event happening in their field. A pep rally may also be held after a sporting event, for example to celebrate the success or win of a championship game.

These school gathering are said to allow students to feel included, have a sense of belonging, or feel appreciated.

== See also ==
- Pep talk
