= General Darling =

General Darling may refer to:

- Douglas Darling (1914–1978), British Army major general
- Henry Darling (1780–1845), British Army major general
- Kenneth Darling (1909–1998), British Army general
- Ralph Darling (1772–1858), British Army general
- Thomas G. Darling (born 1932), U.S. Air Force major general
