= Texas A&M University Corps of Cadets =

Corps of Cadets
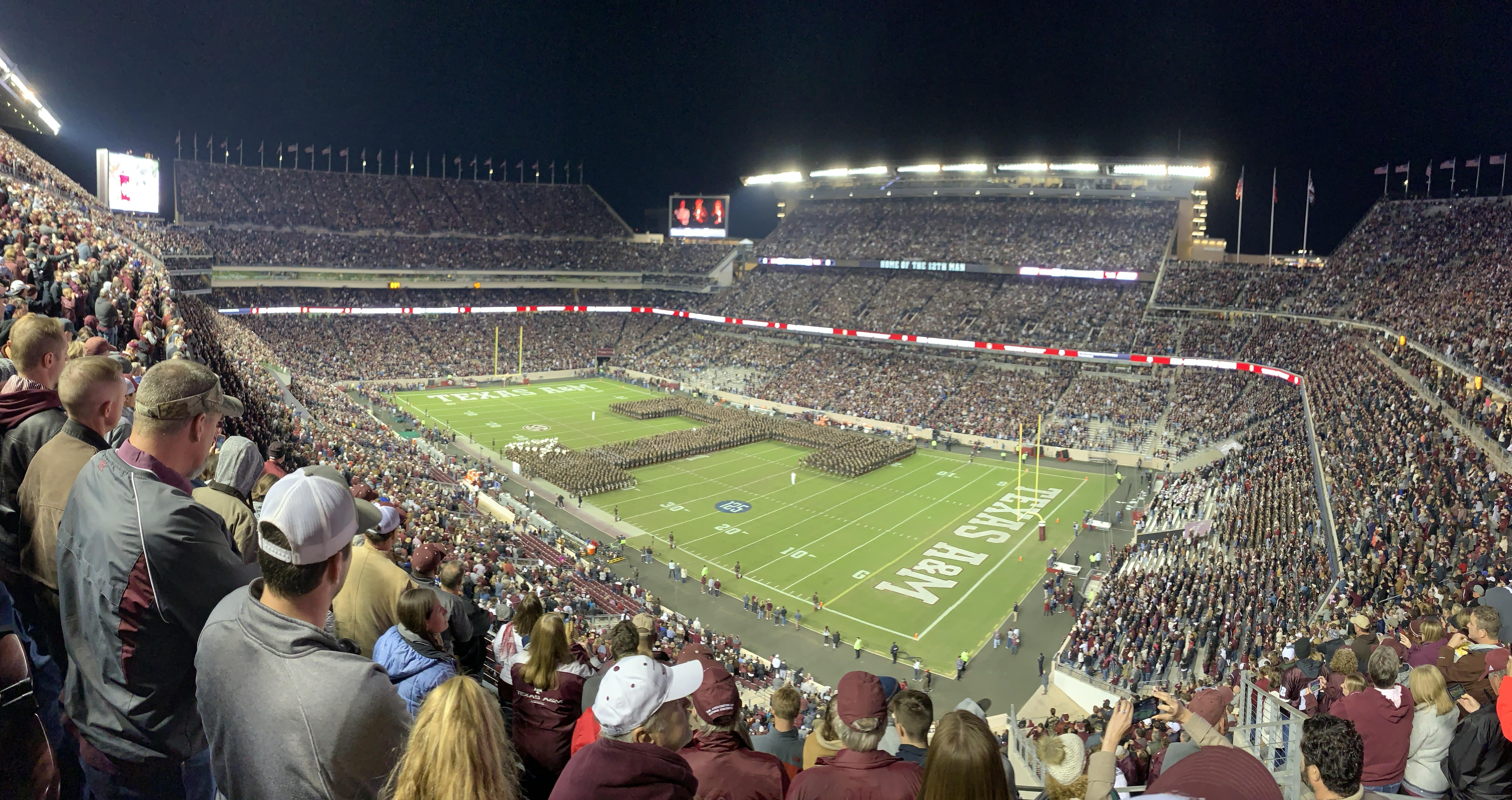
- Corps of Cadets in 2019 on Kyle Field in Block T formation
- Active: 1876 − present
- Country: United States
- Allegiance: Texas
- Type: Senior military college
- Role: Officer Training/Leadership Development
- Part of: Texas A&M University
- Garrison/HQ: College Station, Texas
- Nicknames: "Keepers of the Spirit" "Guardians of Tradition"
- Mottos: Per Unitatem Vis (Latin: "Through Unity, Strength")
- Mascot: Reveille X
- Website: https://corps.tamu.edu/

Commanders
- Commandant of the Corps: Lieutenant General James Bierman
- Chief of Staff: Meredith Simpson

Insignia
- Corps of Cadets' "Corps Stack"

The Texas A&M University Corps of Cadets (often The Corps of Cadets, or simply the Corps) is a student military organization at Texas A&M University. Established with the university in 1876, it is the oldest student organization on campus.

Students who elect to join the Corps must participate in mandatory Reserve Officer Training Corps (ROTC) courses and training for the first three semesters, but they are optional after that. All cadets are required to attend leadership classes in the School of Military Science coordinated by the Commandant's Office. Approximately 40% of the members of the Cadet Corps continue with the ROTC curriculum, contract with the military, and receive commissions as officers in the United States armed forces upon graduation. Juniors and seniors who do not have military contracts to receive commissions but wish to remain members of the Cadet Corps are classified as "Drill & Ceremonies" (D&C) cadets. As established under federal law, Texas A&M is one of six U.S. colleges classified as senior military colleges and is the largest.

== History ==
=== Early years ===
The Corps of Cadets was founded in 1876 with the creation of the all-male, military-focused Agricultural and Mechanical College of Texas under the Morrill Act of 1862. The Morrill Act did not specify the extent of military training, leading many land-grant schools to provide only minimal training, Texas A&M was an exception. The only mention of military training is in Section 4:

...the leading object shall be, without excluding other scientific and classical studies, and including military tactics, to teach such branches of learning as are related to agriculture and the mechanic arts...

In 1876, Robert Page Waller Morris, a 1872 graduate of Virginia Military Institute, joined the university staff and was assigned as the first Commandant of the Corps. In this role, he drafted the first set of Corps regulations and designed the first cadet uniform. Prior to joining Texas A&M, Morris served as a professor at the Texas Military Institute alongside John Garland James and Hardaway Hunt Dinwiddie, who were also VMI cadets. James and Dinwiddie both became future presidents of Texas A&M. Morris' experience at VMI and TMI influenced the foundation he laid for Texas A&M's interpretation of the Morrill Act of 1862. P. L. Downs, Class of 1879 and private secretary to Texas A&M's 1st president, Thomas S. Gathright, was quoted on the president's stance regarding military discipline at the university.

Gathright was wholly opposed to any military discipline. He believed in putting the boys on their honor and trusting them implicitly, and yet Major Morris, as Commandant, insisted upon carrying out the governmental requirements as to military training and that did not altogether suit the president.

In November 1879, the first administration was dismissed, including Morris. The board was not happy with the direction of the college and a great rift had developed in the faculty due to an event known as the "Crisp Affair." The four-day proceedings are well documented in the Galveston Daily News. The board quickly restaffed the faculty, largely with members from the Texas Military Institute. John Garland James, then president of TMI, was named as the 2nd president of the university. One of James' first hires was John Waller Clark, a recent VMI graduate, to serve as the Assistant Commandant. During his tenure, James strongly advocated for the military training aspect of A&M's curriculum. The following is a quote from John Garland James regarding his beliefs about military training in an academic setting.

The military system of school government... tends to develop in the student a high sense of personal honor and moral responsibility, and to give him those habits of regularity, promptness, self-reliance, and respect for proper authority, which go far to make the good citizen and the successful man of business. It thus becomes a potent factor in the formation of true character.

In 1883, out of frustration, James resigned, and James Reid Cole was named 3rd president of the university. Cole served as president for only a few months when the board made a surprise move removing Cole from the office of president naming Hardaway Hunt Dinwiddie in the new position of Chairman of the Faculty. Dinwiddie was also VMI alumnus and a strong believer in military training. By the time Dinwiddie's death in 1887, Texas A&M's military tradition was strongly instituted.

Through the first four administrations there were overtures to reduce the military aspect of Texas A&M. The first president, Thomas S. Gathright, was not a strong advocate and often had differences with Morris. James faced criticisms of the regimen from the state legislature, and Dinwiddie faced the pressures of strong competition from the newly formed University of Texas at Austin.

For the school's first thirty-one years, through the 1907–08 academic year, the Cadet Corps was organized into one battalion consisting of two to four companies, designated companies "A", "B", "C", and "D". Early on, these were designated "Infantry" companies, but the Commandant ensured that Artillery training was included in the military instruction. The Aggie Band was organized in 1894 as a permanent institution within the Corps. In 1908, with enrollment over 570, a second battalion was added. As enrollment climbed, the Cadet Corps continued to grow to multiple battalions, each with two to four companies, and the Corps became divided into multiple regiments.

The academic year 1916–17 saw the division of the Corps into two regiments. The following year, the two regiments had a total of six battalions composed of eighteen companies and a battery of field artillery. In 1918, enrollment surged to 1,284, almost a fifty percent increase over the previous year. In the 1919–20 school year, a Signal Corps battalion and a Mounted Cavalry battalion (later called a "cavalry squadron") with one cavalry troop were added. An Air Service squadron with one company-sized "flight" was added in the 1920–21 school year.

In the fall of 1923, the Cadet Corps, with a total of 2,091 cadets in twenty-three individual units, became divided between the Infantry Regiment and the Composite Regiment. The Composite Regiment included the Cavalry, Field Artillery, Air Service and Signal Corps units. The Air Corps Squadron (formerly Air Service Squadron) was phased out at the end of the 1927–28 school year. In the fall of 1928, with enrollment at 2,770 cadets, an Engineer Battalion was added, and the following year a third regiment was formed out of the expanded Field Artillery Battalion. A fourth battalion, the Coast Artillery, was added to the Composite Regiment in the fall of 1933.

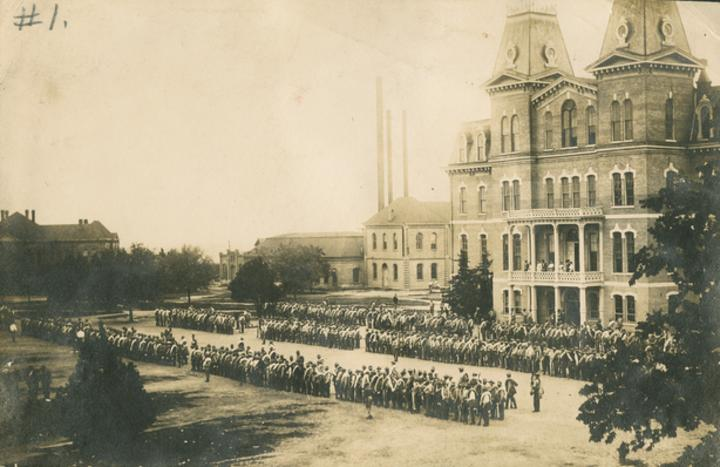
Corps Formation outside of Old Main, circa 1912

The Cadet Corps enrollment hit a peak of 2,770 in 1928, but the Great Depression took its toll, and by the fall of 1932 enrollment had fallen to 2,001. But as the Depression waned and the U.S. involvement in the war became imminent, enrollment climbed back to a pre-War total of over 6,500 in the fall of 1941. In 1935, swelling enrollment forced the formation of an Engineer Regiment and a Cavalry Regiment. With these two new regiments, added to the Infantry, Field Artillery and Composite regiments, the Cadet Corps, for the first time in its history, now had a total of 5 regiments, encompassing thirty-two individual units (companies, batteries and troops). That same year, a Chemical Warfare Service Company was added to the Composite Regiment, and the following year a second company warranted the formation of a Chemical Warfare Service Battalion. A sixth regiment, the Coast Artillery Regiment, was added in 1937. In 1939, the Band had grown to the point that it was now divided into two units, the Infantry and Artillery Bands.

In the fall of 1942, as citizens of Texas responded to America's need for military officers, the number of individual military units in the Cadet Corps hit an all-time high with a total of seven regiments of seventeen battalions comprising sixty companies, batteries, and troops, including the Band. The Cadet Corps at Texas A&M sent over 20,229 former cadets into World War II, 14,123 of them as commissioned officers, more than the combined totals of both military academies. By February 1943 enrollment dropped to less than 4,000 as Cadets left school to serve in the U.S. military. The 1944–45 school year saw enrollment drop to as low as 1,600 and the depletion of cadets forced the reorganization of the Corps down to only two regiments (Infantry and Composite) consisting of a total of only 17 companies, batteries and troops, including the two Band units. In 1943, the U.S. Army declared the Mounted Cavalry obsolete, although Cavalry units continued at Texas A&M as mechanized units until the end of the 1949–50 academic year.

=== Post-World War II ===
World War II and the demands of the U.S. military took their toll on enrollment. But, with the end of the war, as enrollment surged in the fall of 1946, Texas A&M gained the use of Bryan Air Force Base, which was being closed, and converted a number of its buildings into dormitories. In 1947, all entering freshmen, approximately 1,500, were assigned to the Bryan Air Force Base "Annex" which became essentially a freshman campus. The Cadet Corps reorganized again to accommodate these unusual conditions. The 1947–48 Cadet Corps consisted of five regiments, a Headquarters Group, and the Band during that academic year. The five regiments (a combined Infantry and Veterans regiment, an Artillery regiment, a combined Air Force and Cavalry regiment, a combined Engineer and Composite regiment, and the "Training Regiment" consisting of nine companies of freshmen), the Headquarters Group and the Band were composed of a total of 35 individual military units. The 1951–52 academic year saw the organization of the Cadet Corps at is largest in number of individual units. Sixty-six units (companies, batteries and squadrons) were divided among 8 regiments (Infantry, Artillery, Armor/Engineers, First Air Force Wing, 2nd Air Force Wing, Composite Regiment, Seventh Regiment and the Eighth Freshman Training Regiment) consisting of 21 battalions and the Band.

During this post-war era and into the 1950s, the various units of the Corps continued to be identified by their military branch. The traditional branches (Infantry, Field Artillery, Cavalry, Engineers, Coast Artillery, Quartermaster, Ordinance, Signal Corps, Armor, Chemical Corps, Transportation, Army Security, and Army Air Force) continued to be represented. But the strength of air power and the rise of the importance of the U.S. Air Force during this era was evident in the organization of the Cadet Corps as Army Air Corps units became Air Force flights (later squadrons). Veterans companies and flights were formed to separate these older veterans from younger cadets. Beginning in 1948 athletes were organized into their own batteries (later companies) to accommodate special team practice schedules. That same year, 1948, the Freshman Regiment added a Band Company and four Air Force flights for a total of 12 units. The Eighth Freshman Training Regiment was moved to the main campus in the fall of 1950, and by 1951, it consisted of a total of 15 freshman companies, batteries and squadrons, each with a branch designation, attached to which was a Senior Battalion of four companies of cadet Seniors. During the 1953–54 school year, over one-third of the 57 Corps units, a total of 21, consisted of Freshmen. The following year, freshmen were incorporated back into the other Corps units. The 1954–55 school year, saw the Cadet Corps begin to take on the organization (two Army regiments and two Air Force wings, and the Band) that is familiar to most former cadets today. The Band, which in 1939 had divided itself into an Infantry company and an Artillery Battery (Field Artillery Band in 1940), dropped those branch designations in 1947 in favor of the two designations Maroon Band and White Band.

The first unit logos, which later evolved into the now common unit names, began to appear among the Air Force units in the 1955–56 Aggieland yearbook. A few of the Army units began to follow suit in the 1957-58 Aggieland. But, in the 1959–60 academic year, with the complete reorganization of the First and Second Brigades and the official abandonment of the Army Branch designations, the units in the two Army Brigades began to adopt unit nicknames and mascots, or "outfit logos," in earnest.

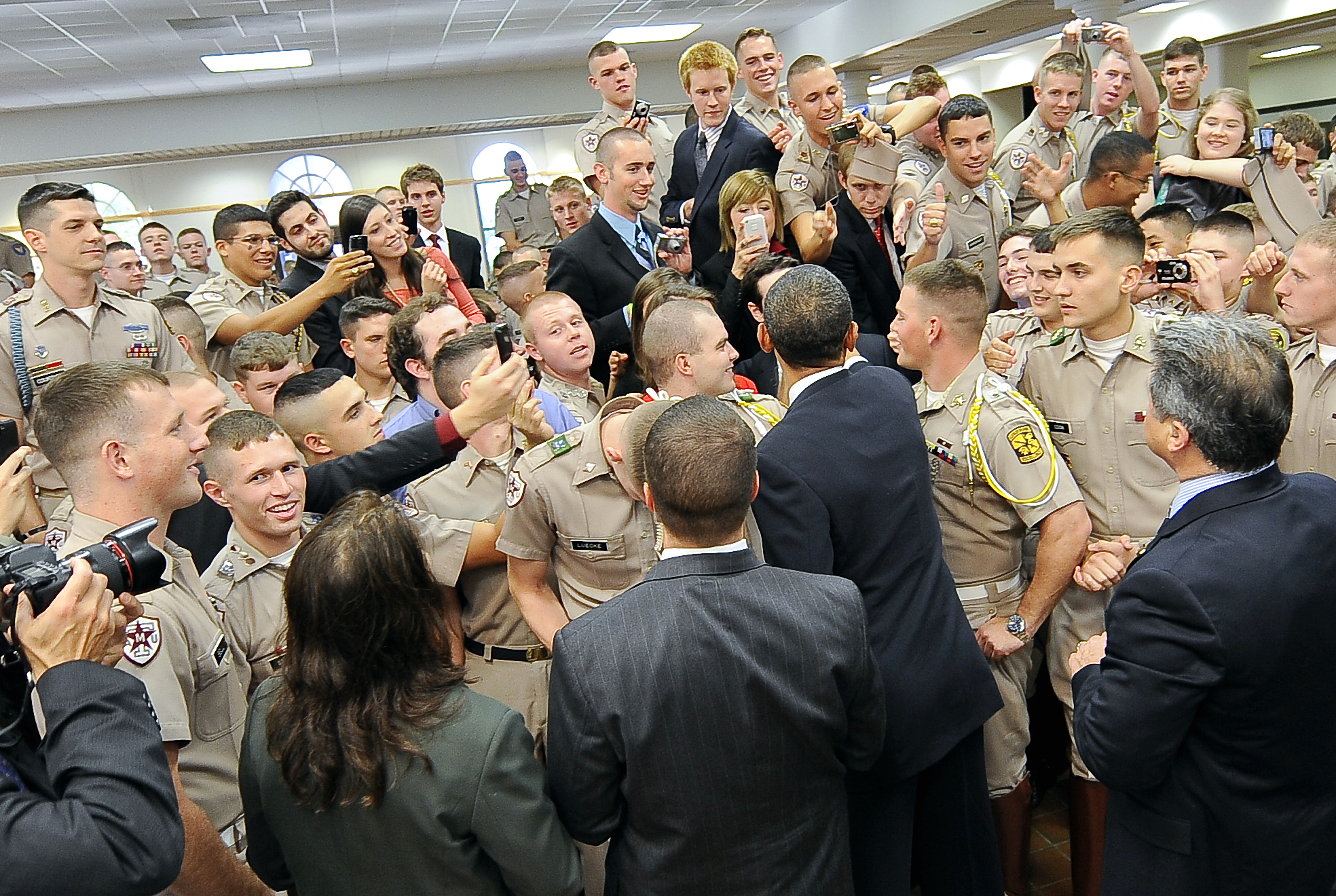
President Barack Obama shakes hands with Cadets during a visit to the campus in October 2009.

During the Vietnam War era, the Cadet Corps was composed of two to three Army Brigades, two to three Air Force Wings, and the Band. Each brigade was composed of two or three battalions of three to five companies each, and each Wing was composed of two groups of three to six squadrons each. During this period the Corps was composed of as many as 40 individual companies and squadrons, including the Band.

Texas A&M remained a primarily all-male military institution with mandatory membership in the Cadet Corps until 1964, when the school began admitting women. In 1965 Corps membership became voluntary for students.

The Corps first incorporated female members in the fall of 1974. At the time, the women were placed into a special unit, known as W-1. Harassment from their male counterparts was commonplace. Women were initially prohibited from serving in leadership positions or in the more elite Corps units such as the Band and the Ross Volunteers. These groups were opened to female participation in fall of 1985, following a federal court decision in a class-action lawsuit filed by a female cadet; five years later, female-only units were eliminated.

In 1977, Freshman Orientation Week was introduced for incoming fish, culminating in the tradition of the "Fish Review", which has occurred since 1988.

In 2007, the corps consisted of 3 Brigades, 2 Regiments, 2 Wings, the Aggie Band, and a task force of special units and veterans outfits.

=== Historical service ===
Members of the Cadet Corps have served in every major conflict fought by the United States since the Spanish–American War. During World War II, Texas A.M.C. produced 20,229 Aggies who served in combat. Of those, 14,123 were commissioned as officers, more than the combined total of the United States Naval Academy and the United States Military Academy during the same timeframe. Over 250 Aggies have served as generals or flag officers, and nine alumni have been awarded the highest United States military award, the Medal of Honor:

- Horace S. Carswell, Jr., class of 1938
- Thomas W. Fowler, class of 1943
- William G. Harrell, class of 1943
- Lloyd H. Hughes, class of 1943
- George D. Keathley, class of 1937
- Turney W. Leonard, class of 1942
- Eli L. Whiteley, class of 1941
- Clarence E. Sasser, class of 1973*
- Matthew O. Williams, class of 2025*

*Sasser and Williams were not in the Corps and joined A&M after receiving the Medal of Honor

=== Modern corps ===
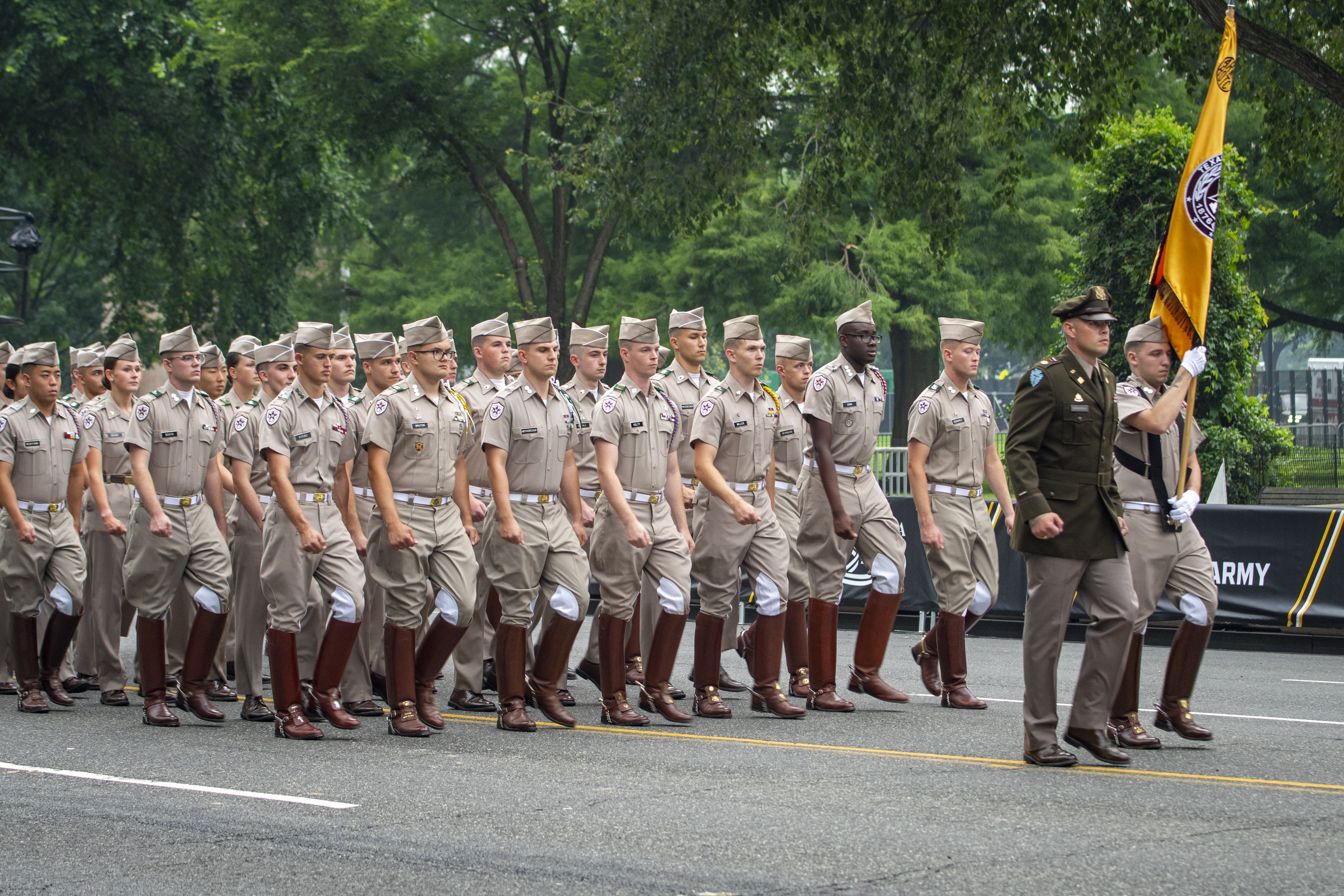
A contingent from the Corps of Cadets at the U.S. Army 250th Anniversary Parade, 16 June 2025.

Today, the Cadet Corps is a coeducational institution, and all but eight of its units are gender-integrated. Over 2,500 students, including over 300 women are members of the Corps, and, although this is only a small percentage of the overall student population, the Corps remains a highly visible presence on campus, a reminder of the school's origins as an all-male military college. Cadets are active in many campus organizations and are renowned for their school spirit and have the moniker "Keepers of the Spirit". Texas A&M is one of six U.S. colleges classified as senior military colleges under federal law and is the largest.

All military branches are represented in the organization of the Cadet Corps and is composed of an Air Force/Space Force Wing, an Army Brigade, a Navy/Marine Regiment, as well as The Fightin' Texas Aggie Band whose members may be affiliated with any military branch. Approximately 40% of the Corps go on to receive a commission in the armed forces after graduating

In December 2018, the Corps of Cadets participated in the funeral services for President George H. W. Bush as he was laid to rest alongside the late First Lady Barbara Bush and their daughter Robin at the George Bush Presidential Library on the Texas A&M campus.

In April 2022, the campaign "March to 3,000" was launched to grow the Corps of Cadets to 3,000 members from around 2,143 in the fall 2021.

== Organization ==
=== Office of the Commandant ===
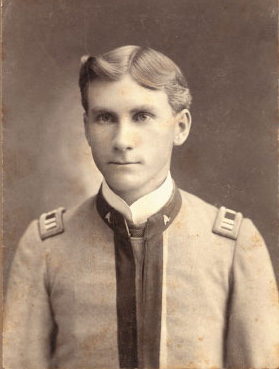
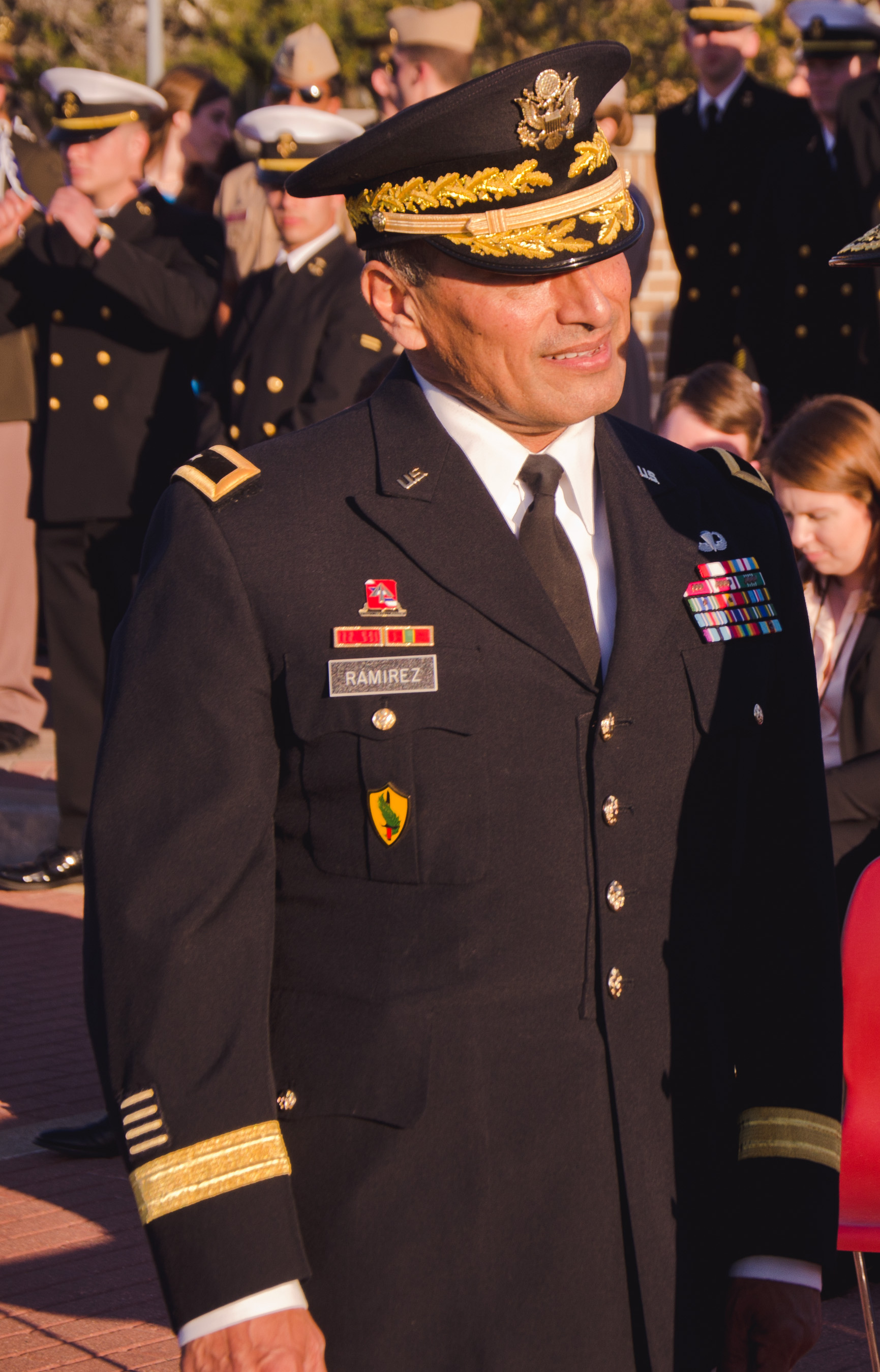
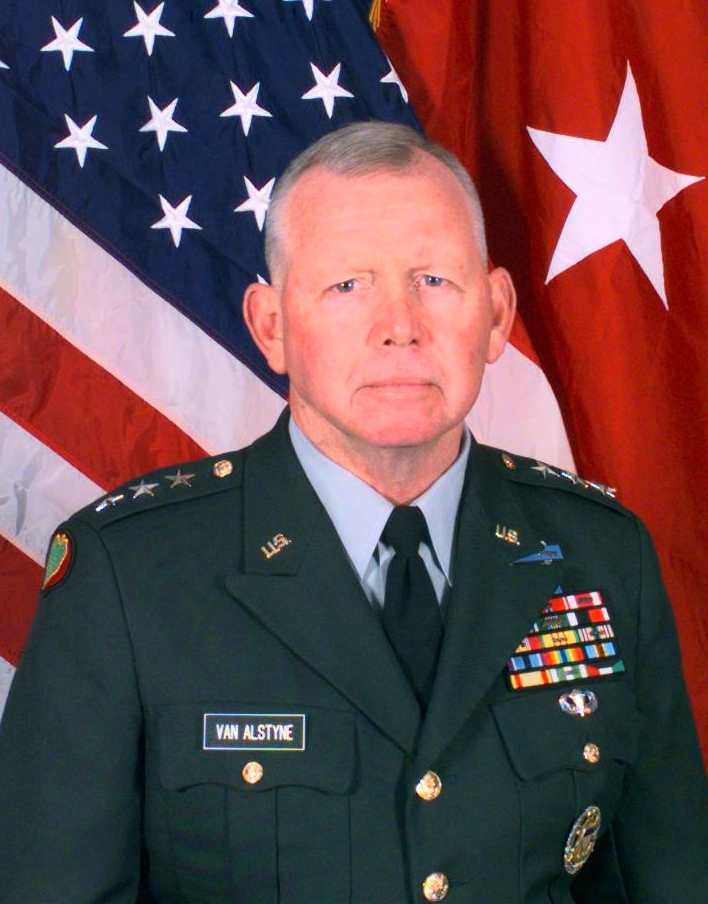
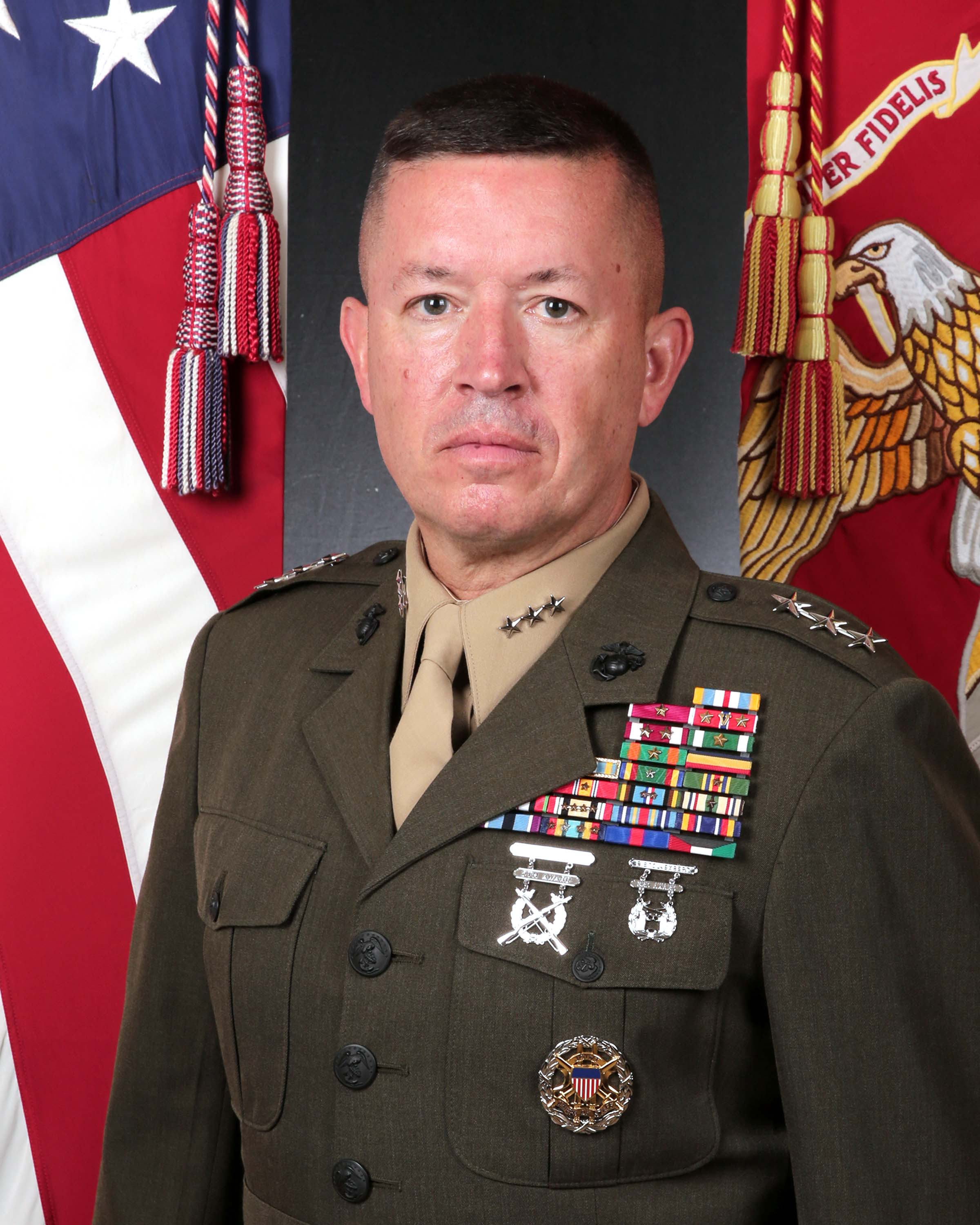
- Top left: Edwin Jackson Kyle, the namesake of Kyle Field, in 1890 wearing his cadet uniform.
- Top right: Brigadier General Joe Ramirez, the first commandant from a minority group.
- Bottom left: Lieutenant General John Van Alstyne.
- Bottom right: Lieutenant General James Bierman is the current Commandant.

The commandant is the head of the School of Military Science. Along with his chief of staff and assistant commandants, they provide administrative and professional leadership for the Corps. Organizationally, the ROTC units are organized under the commandant led by a representative of each of the military branches: the Professor of Military Science (Army ROTC), the Professor of Naval Science (Navy and Marine Corps ROTC), and the Professor of Aerospace Studies (Air Force and Space Force ROTC).

==== Corps Commandants ====
No.	Commandant of Cadets		Term		Former Corps member	Notes and Reference
No.	Portrait	Name	Took office	Left office	Former Corps member	Notes and Reference
1		Major Robert Morris	1876	1877	No	
2		Captain George Olmstead	1877	1881		
3		Captain C. J. Crane	1881	1884		
4		Lieutenant John S. Mallory	1884	1886		
5		Lieutenant Guy Carleton	1886	1888	No	
6		Lieutenant William Scott	1889	1890		
7		Lieutenant Benjamin Morse	1890	1894		
8		Lieutenant George Bartlett	1894	1898		
9		Colonel John Carter Edmonds	April 1898	July 1898		
10		Harry Martin	1898	March 1899		
11		Edwin Jackson Kyle	March 1899	May 1899		The only cadet to have held the position of commandant.
12		Colonel John Carter Edmonds	May 1899	1901		
13		Captain E. P. Avery	1901	1903		
14		Captain Herbert Sargent	1903	1907		
15		Captain Andrew Moses	1907	1911	No	
16		Lieutenant Fenton	1911	1912		
17		Lieutenant Levi Brown	1912	1914		
18		Lieutenant James Hill	1914	1916		
19		Captain C. H. Muller	1916	1917		
20		Colonel C. S. Crane	1917	1918		
21		Colonel C. H. Muller	1918	1919		
22		Louis Dougherty	1919	1920		
23		Lieutenant Colonel Ike Ashburn	1920	1923		
24		Colonel Charles Todd	1923	1925		
25		Lieutenant Colonel P. H. Turnell	1925	1927		
26		Colonel Charles Nelson	1927	1932		
27		Lieutenant Colonel John Mitchell	1932	1935		
28		Colonel Frank Anderson	1935	1937		
29		Colonel George F. Moore	1937	1940	Yes	
30		Lieutenant Colonel James Watson	1940	1941		
31		Colonel Maurice Welty	1941	1946		
32		Colonel Guy S. Meloy Jr.	1946	1948	No	
33		Colonel Haydon L. Boatner	1948	1951	No	
34		Colonel Joe Davis	1951	1963		
35		Colonel D. L. Baker	1963	1967		
36		Colonel Jim McCoy	1967	1971		
37		Colonel Thomas Parsons	1971	1977	Yes, A Field Artillery	
38		Colonel James Woodall	1977	1982	Yes, D Infantry	
39		Colonel Donald Burton	1982	1986	Yes, B Armor	
40		J. Malon Southerland	1986	1987	Yes, Company F-2	
41		Major General Thomas G. Darling	1987	1996	Yes, Squadron 11	
42		Major General M. T. Hopgood	1996	2002	Yes, Company A-1	
43		Lieutenant General John Van Alstyne	2002	2010	Yes, Company F-3	
44		Colonel Jake Betty	2010	2010	Yes, Company E-2	
45		Brigadier General Joe Ramirez	2010	2021	Yes, B-Company	
-		Colonel Byron Stebbins	2021	2022	Yes, Company N-1	
46		Brigadier General Patrick Michaelis, USA, Retired	2022	2024	Yes, Company E-1	
-		Lieutenant General Loyd S. “Chip” Utterback	2024	2025	Yes, Squadron 2	
47		Lieutenant General James W. Bierman Jr.	2025	Incumbent	No	

=== Corps structure ===
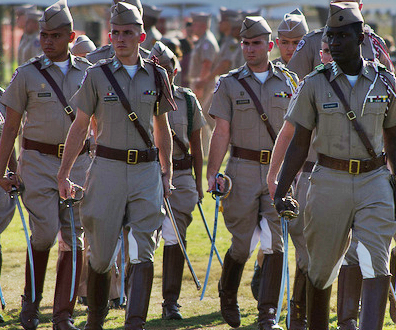
Marquis Alexander, the first black corps commander, leading the corps staff during a review in 2012.

The Corps of Cadets has its own cadet commander, a cadet colonel, the deputy corps commander, the chief of staff, the corps sergeant major and 21 other cadet officers and sergeants. The Corps of Cadets is organized and modeled after an army corps including Continental Staff positions in both the Corps leadership and the individual units.

==== Corps organization (2024-2025) ====
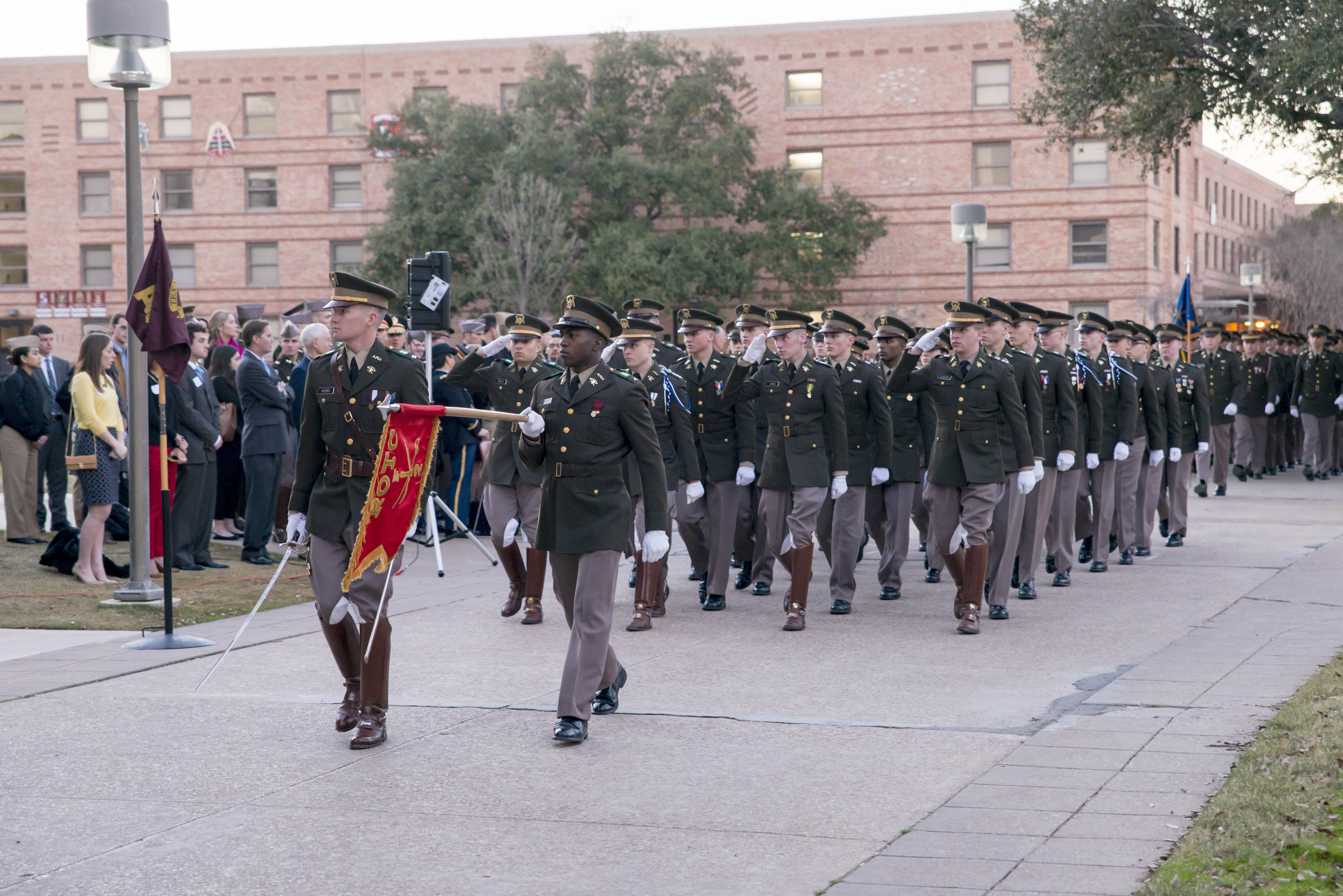
Company F-2 at the SCONA review.

Major Unit	ROTC Affiliation	Minor Units	Outfit			
1st Brigade	Army	1st Battalion	A-2 Peacekeepers**	Battlin' B-1	F-2 Foxes#	L-1 Lonestar Company*
1st Brigade	Army	2nd Battalion	D-2 Dogs*	Red Eye I-1#	Kayo K-1 (Transfer)	
1st Brigade	Army	3rd Battalion	Animal A-1	B-2 Patriots*	E-1 Jocks*	
1st Regiment	Navy/Marines	5th Battalion	Gladiator G-2#	Trident P-2	Spartan S-1	
1st Regiment	Navy/Marines	6th Battalion	(C-2) Old Army Cock Company*	E-2 Mascot Company (Note: E-2 is the unit responsible for taking care of Reveille, Texas A&M's mascot.)	N-1 Knights	
1st Regiment	Navy/Marines	7th Battalion	D-1 Devils (Transfer)	S-2 Marauders	Killer K-2*	Ramblin' G-1 Rogues
1st Wing	Air Force	1st Group	Huslin' 1	Gator 2	Thunderbird 3	
1st Wing	Air Force	2nd Group	Avenger 5	Savage 6	Outlaw 8	Heaven's 11#
1st Wing	Air Force	3rd Group	Talon 12#	Falcon 16#	Challenger 17*	
1st Wing	Air Force	4th Group	Phantom 18 (Transfer)	Titan 20**	Hellcat 21	Nighthawk 23
Band	N/A	Artillery Band	A-Battery Noblemen	B-Battery Wildmen	C-Battery Marksmen	
Band	N/A	Infantry Band	A-Company Wolfpack	B-Company Street Fighters	C-Company Crusaders	
Other			Delta Company (Note: D-Co is a unit for veterans who have been deployed at least once.)			

Key: * male-only unit, # historically STEM unit, ** Pre-professional unit. Note that "Company A-1" or "Squadron 2" are the official designations of the outfits in the Corps. The nicknames of the outfits are included as they are an integral part of the tradition and heritage of the Corps. Squadron 18, K-1, and D-1 are the (transfer) outfits for out-of-cycle cadets who will be completing their freshman year in one semester.

=== Special units ===
The following are special units within the Corps of which cadets can additionally be members (for example a cadet in D-2 could be a member of the Ross Volunteers, but not the Band).

==== Ross Volunteers ====
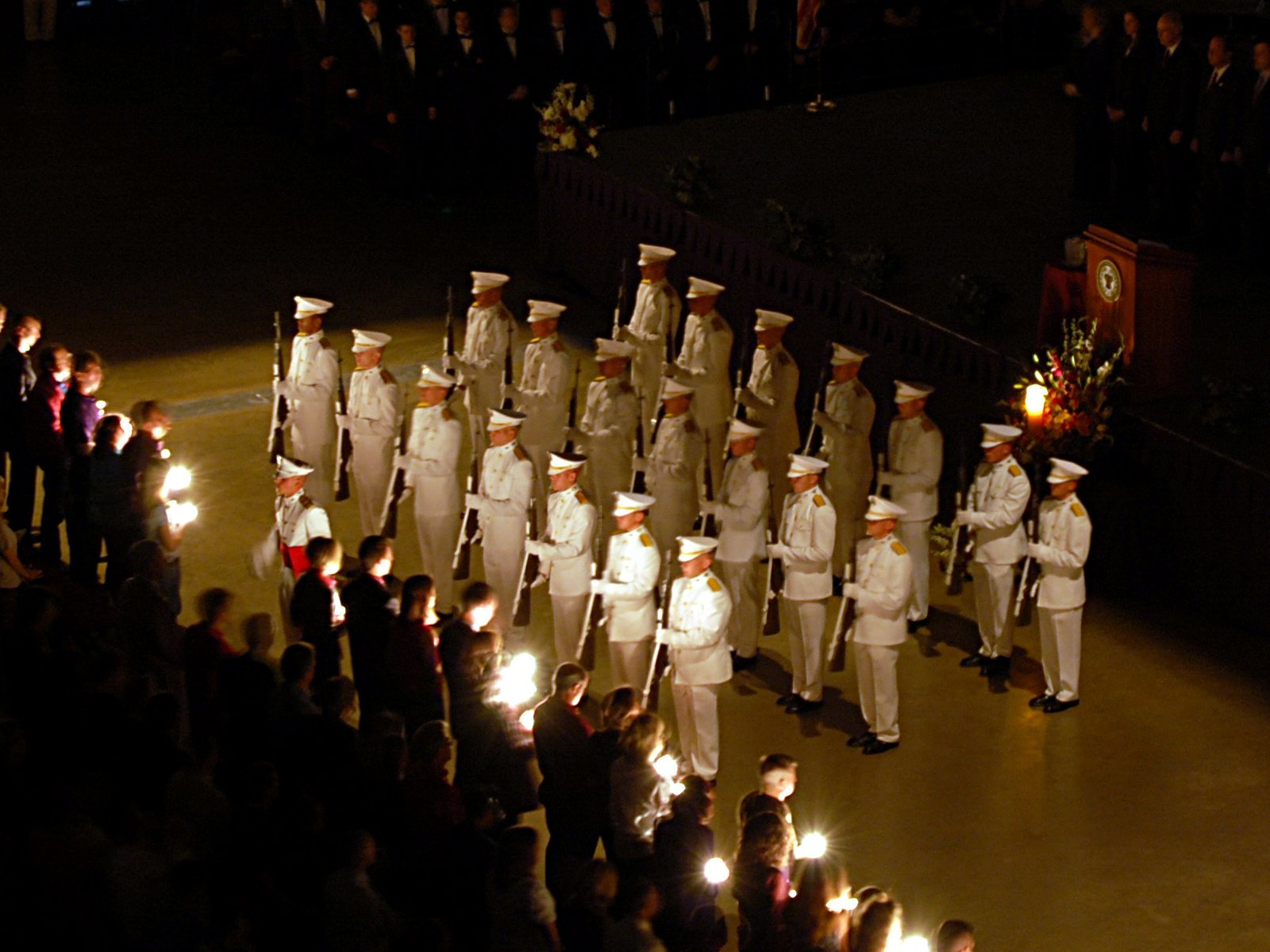
The Ross Volunteers perform a rifleman's salute as candles are lit for the deceased at the 2007 Aggie Muster at Reed Arena

The Ross Volunteer Company is the official Honor Guard for the Governor of the state of Texas, and, aside from the Cadet Corps itself, is the oldest student organization in the state of Texas. Started in 1887 during the tenure of President H. H. Dinwiddie, the organization was originally named the Scott Volunteers after Col. Thomas M. Scott, the college's business manager. In 1898, the company was renamed for Texas A&M President Lawrence Sullivan Ross.

The company is composed of junior and senior cadets. Cadets are chosen on a basis of honor, humility, and character. Each fall, approximately 72 junior cadets are selected into the company by the RV seniors. A critical voting process, undisclosed to outside sources, is conducted to select the new junior inductees. Once the juniors are inducted into the company, it is composed of those newly selected juniors and 35 seniors holding leadership positions. Seniors not selected for leadership positions retain their membership.

Today, the RV uniform is a distinctive white uniform, with yellow trim. Officers in the RV Company (Commanding Officer, Executive Officer, Administrative Officer, Operations Officer, and three Platoon Leaders) as well as one Non-Commissioned Officer (1st Sergeant) wear a silk red sash around the waist of the white uniform. The RV Company performs a 3-volley, 21-gun salute at the traditional Silver Taps ceremony and at the annual campus Muster event. In addition, the RV Company marches in several parades each year including the Rex Parade on Mardi Gras in New Orleans, Louisiana. The RVs serve as the honor guard of Rex, the king of Mardi Gras. Other duties include Texas Gubernatorial events, funerals, weddings, and campus events.

==== Fish Drill Team ====
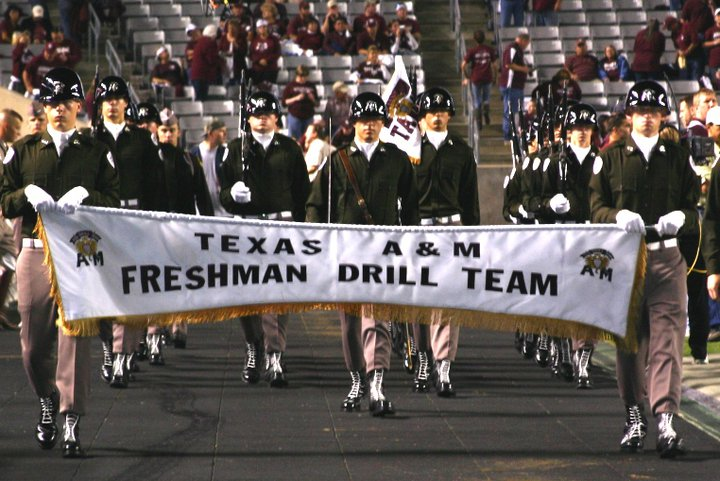
Fish Drill Team class of 2014 Marches into Kyle Field

This all-freshman precision rifle drill team represents Texas A&M and its Corps of Cadets in competition with other colleges at military drill meets around the nation. The team began when the freshmen were moved from the main campus to deal with the overcrowding and hazing issues that followed World War II and the return of war veterans to the A&M campus. The freshmen were moved to the Riverside Campus Annex and lived in the dorms of the retired Bryan Air Force Base twelve miles from campus. They were bussed to class each day, but primarily lived in isolation from the rest of the Corps. In order to "promote unity and focus on military precision", the freshmen organized themselves into the Freshman Drill Team in the fall of 1947

Over the following 75 years, the team earned dozens of national championships including every national title since 2004, except 2009, when the team placed 2nd. They were selected to portray the United States Marine Corps Silent Drill Platoon during the opening segment of the 1992 film A Few Good Men and served as army soldiers in training in Courage Under Fire.

Despite a successful record in drill competitions nationwide, in 1997 the Fish Drill Team was put on hiatus for four years due to leadership concerns and issues, most notably hazing of students. The team was reinstated in the spring of 2002.

==== Parsons Mounted Cavalry ====
A member of Parsons Mounted Cavalry guarding The Spirit of '02 before a home football game

Parsons Mounted Cavalry serves as the only mounted ROTC cavalry unit in the country. They were formed in the spring of 1973 to preserve the traditions of the Texas A&M cavalry through the 1930s. The unit represents the university at football games, parades, agricultural, and equestrian events throughout Texas. It is named after Colonel Thomas R. Parsons who oversaw the creation of the unit, former Commandant from 1972 to 1978 and the only active-duty Commandant at Texas A&M.

Within this special unit, Half Section (responsible for Field Artillery and Mule Team elements) maintains the "Spirit of '02", a field gun found in the fall of 1974 at a Aggie Bonfire cut site near Easterwood Airport. The cannon is driven by a 4 horse team and a restored caisson to Kyle Field and fired during all home football games, midnight yell practice, and other special events. While Aggie lore states the gun was the runaway that tumbled over a ridge in the film We've Never Been Licked, there is no conclusive evidence.

==== ROTC special units ====
There are many special units under the different ROTC programs and their cadet-led units: The Warrior Training Battalion, the Midshipmen Battalion and Air Force Detachment 805.

Unit	Description
Rudder's Rangers	Rudder's Rangers is named for James Earl Rudder, commander of the 2nd Ranger Battalion that stormed the beaches at Normandy. Upon retirement from the military, Rudder became the 16th president of Texas A&M University. Rudder's Rangers trains volunteer Army ROTC cadets and prepares them to take part in some of the Army's special training schools, such as Airborne School, Air Assault School, and eventually Ranger School. This training happens over a year-long process, during which cadets participate in a winter field training exercise at Fort Cavazos and compete in Texas A&M's Best Ranger Competition. Cadets meeting the requirements are awarded a pin to wear on their uniform.
SEAL Platoon	Under the NROTC program, SEAL Platoon is a team of cadets that prepares cadets to become Navy SEALs, Navy EOD technicians or Navy Diving Officers.
Marine Corps Recon Company	In addition to the platoon, the Marine Corps Recon Company is a team of cadets that prepares cadets for the successful completion of the Marine Corps Basic Reconnaissance Course, allowing them to become Force Recon or Recon Battalion members.
Special Tactics Squadron	The Special Tactics Squadron is a team of cadets that prepares cadets for United States Air Force service within the Special Operations Fields. These Include primarily the Special Tactics Officer (STO), Air Liaison Officer (ALO), and Combat Rescue Officer (CRO). Air Force Special Operations Forces can work as sole units, but are commonly integrated into a US Army Ranger Battalion in special duties. Space Delta Zero is an AFROTC unit affiliated with the United States Space Force.

==== Other corps organizations ====
- AMC Honor Guard (Note: Founded in 2006, after seven Second World War veterans did not receive a military burial, the honor guard is composed of juniors and seniors who fulfill these services in place of the armed forces. Its motto is Veneratio Fortis which is Latin for "Honor the Brave.")
- Arnold Air Society (Major Horace S. Carswell Jr. Squadron)
- C.A.D.E.T (Cultural Awareness and Diversity Expansion Team) (Note: Consists of an African-American, Asian-American, Hispanic, Native American, LGBTQ+, and Religious cadet groups.)
- Color Guard (Note: This special unit consists of a commanding officer, an executive officer, a first sergeant, a senior color sergeant and flagbearers/guards for Corps staff and every major unit except the Band. All color guards are made up exclusively of sophomores, with the exception of a junior who served as a color sergeant.)
- Corps Center Guard
- Corps Cybersecurity Special Unit
- Gen. O.R. Simpson Honor Society (Note: Cadets need to have a cumulative 3.4 GPA to join. Members foster new ideas of academic achievement, leadership and character in the Corps of Cadets and promotion of scholastic excellence through academic related projects which include tutor assistance and operation of a study lounge for all cadets.)
- Major General T. G. Darling Recruiting Company (Note: This unit is designed to serve as a tool for recruiting, and to represent the corps at all recruiting and public functions.)
  - Summer Recruiting Company
- Aggie Eagle Post. Cadets who have earned the Boy Scouts of America, Eagle Scout rank, or the Girl Scouts of the USA, Gold Award, are eligible to join. Members conduct community-wide and scout related service as well as participate in/lead various scouting events at both the state and local level. While the unit has held an active status with the university, the unit was formally reactivated/recognized by the Corps in the fall of 2015.

== Class system ==
As a member of the Corps, a cadet climbs through four classes of seniority. The current Corps of Cadets uniform is unique among military schools, bearing a close resemblance to the US Army uniforms from after World War I to World War II known as Pinks and greens. There are slight differences in the uniform worn by each class year, noted below, including the Senior Boots, calf-skin riding boots harkening back to the US Army cavalry officer's uniform of World War I. All cadets wear the same basic Corps uniform regardless of service affiliation.

=== Freshmen ===
Fish Review fall of 2006

Freshman cadets are called fish. The first year, is analogous to the experiences of the Rooks at Norwich University, Knobs at The Citadel, Rats of the Virginia Tech Corps of Cadets and the Virginia Military Institute, Frogs at University of North Georgia, Doolies at the United States Air Force Academy, or Plebes at any of the other U.S. Federal Service Academies.

Both freshmen and sophomore cadets are required to wear metal taps on the heels of their shoes. In addition, male fish must maintain an extremely short hairstyle known colloquially as a "fish cut". Corps freshmen are not addressed by their first name; a freshman named John Smith would become fish Smith his freshman year in the Corps. A freshman whose last name is not known to the speaker is referred to by the generic name "fish Jones." Cadets who started in the same class year are known as buddies.

In addition to standardized answers, every fish is required to know the answers to a wide number of questions including, "What's for chow?", "How many days until Final Review?", and a long list of university history questions. Upon meeting an upperclassman fish must introduce themselves and learn the upperclassman's name. As the academic year progresses, some upperclassmen will begin to grant the fish permission to use his or her first name and speak more informally.

=== Sophomores ===
Sophomores in the Corps are known as pissheads, often bowdlerized as "head". A sophomore's duty in the Corps is to train and drill the freshmen through all their necessary duties and responsibilities through Final Review in May. They are graded by the performance of their freshmen. Much like drill sergeants, the pissheads are responsible for seeing that the fish adapt and excel in Corps life through rigorous, diligent, and sometimes intense instruction. Sophomores are expected to be the best example of cadets for their fish.

=== Juniors ===
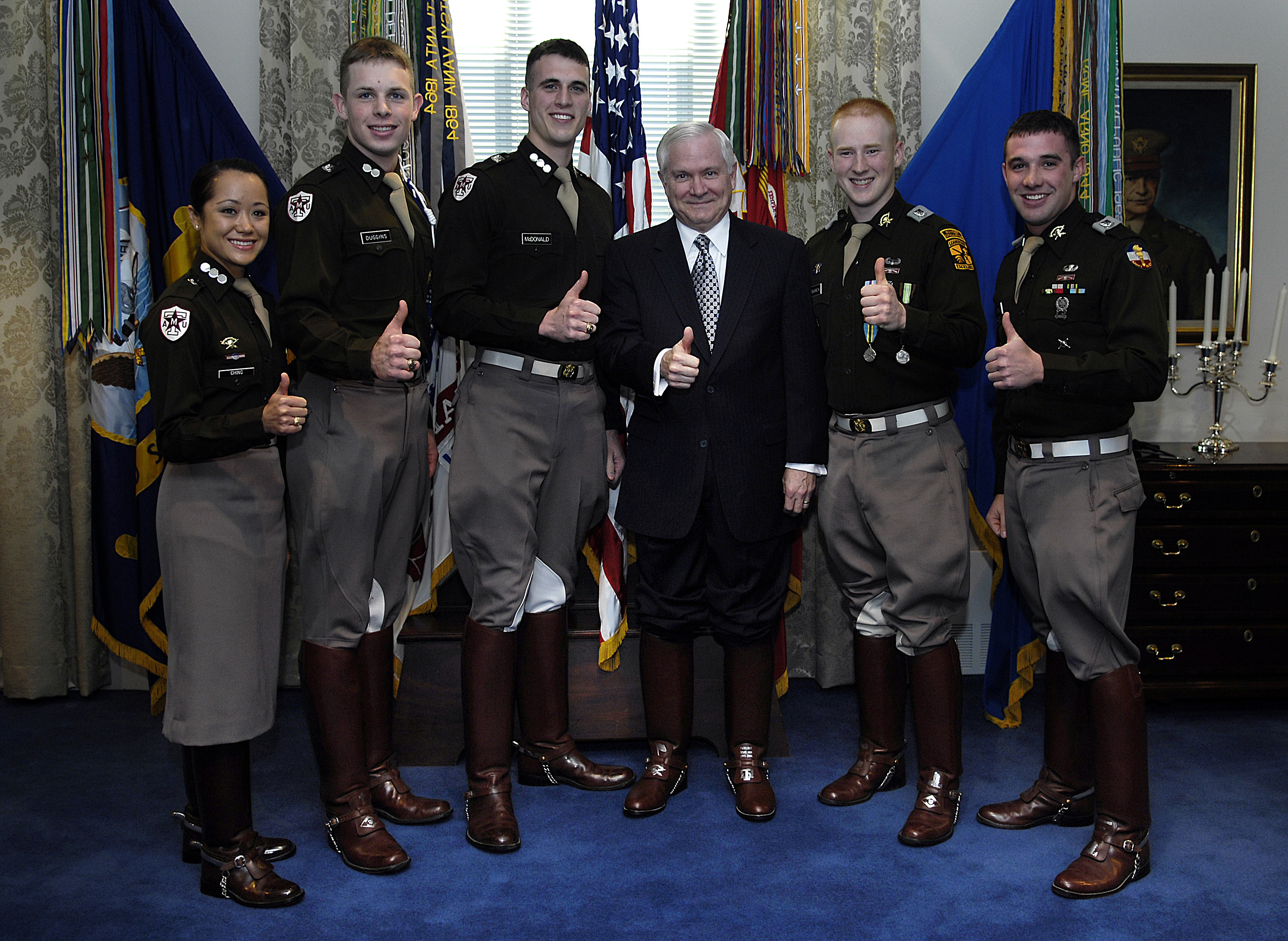
US Secretary of Defense Robert Gates (wearing senior boots) along with senior cadets at the Pentagon give the "Gig 'em"

As a junior, the cadet is called a "sergebutt" or more commonly just butt. The nickname is a result of a junior privilege to purchase tailor made the serge uniforms which were easier to maintain and required less ironing. The Corps juniors, wearing a white braid on their garrison caps and white cotton belts, run the daily operations of the Corps. They hold the rank of cadet sergeant through cadet sergeant major, depending on the position attained.

=== Seniors ===
Senior cadets are often referred to as "zips" (short for "zipperheads"), referring to the black and gold "zipper" braid on the garrison cap. A senior may also be referred to as an "elephant," which derives from the senior class Elephant Walk tradition held the week before the last regularly scheduled football game of the year. Seniors hold cadet officer rank, from Cadet 2nd Lieutenant to Cadet Colonel of the Corps.

Senior cadets, like all seniors at Texas A&M, may also order an Aggie Ring, the symbol of the university and one's graduating class.

A senior cadet is easily recognized by the distinctive brown calf-skin leather boots, known as senior boots, sabre, and gold braid on the garrison cap. Seniors are the only class allowed to wear their bider without a break or fold in the top seam.

== Corps Life ==
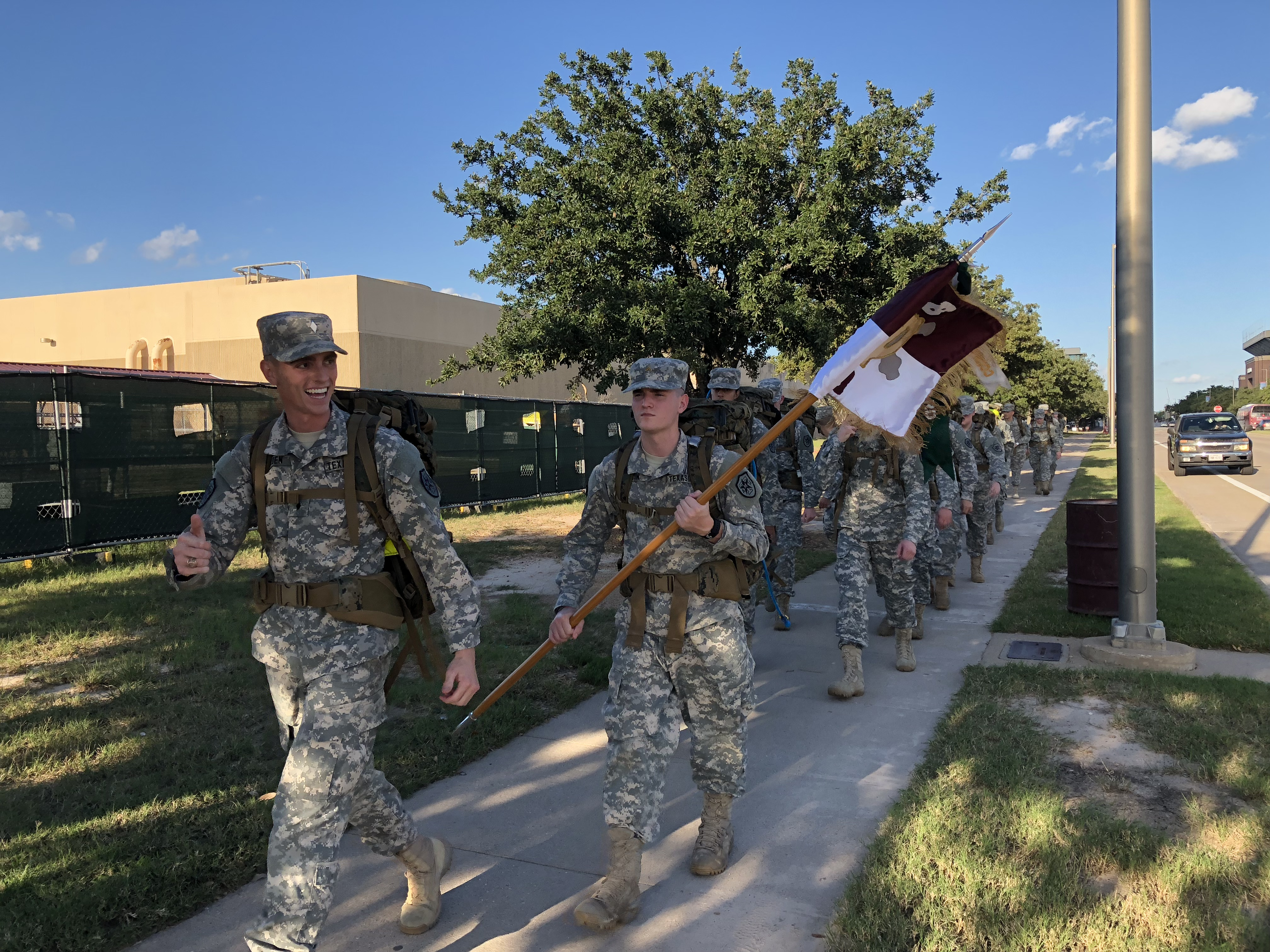
Cadets from the Aggie Band conducting a ruck march on West Campus

Today, cadets no longer occupy all of the student housing on campus. The Corps is housed only in the dorms located in what is now called the Quadrangle, a.k.a. "the Quad". They are divided into companies, batteries, and squadrons, and serve as the basic units of the Corps of Cadets. These units are aligned by ROTC affiliation under a Navy/Marine Regiment, an Air Force Wing, an Army Brigade, a veteran's company, and the Combined Band.

There are normally two Corps formations each day—one in the morning and one in the evening to observe the raising and lowering of the American flag before marching to Duncan Dining Hall for chow. In addition to college classes, cadets participate in daily Corps activities. These can range from intramural sporting events, helping the local community, and unit physical fitness to school football games, trips to military bases, and marksmanship instruction at the rifle range.

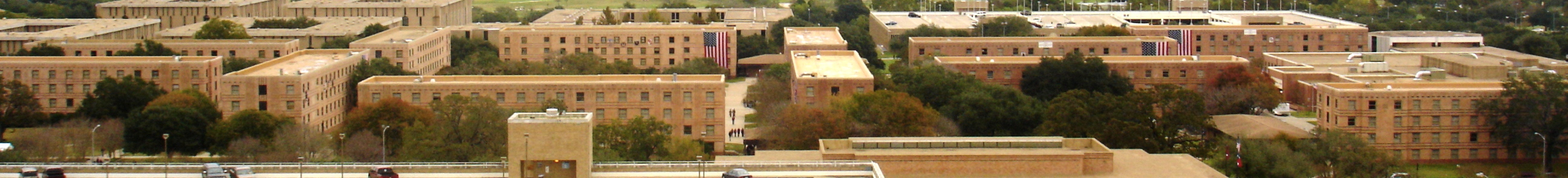
"The Quad" located on the south side of campus

=== Corps Brass ===
Junior cadets at March to the Brazos earning money to donate to the March of Dimes

Following the Corps reorganization and dropping of Army branch designations, cadets required a new symbol to be used. The solution to this was the Corps Brass, the class gift from the Class of 1960. Created by cadets from Company F-1, it is used as the symbol for earning full membership in the Corps. All cadets go through the process of earning it during their first year. It is a shield with knight's helm on it with a sword and fasces crossed behind it and scrollwork over the top that says "Per Unitatem Vis," translating to "Through Unity, Strength." These elements represent how one of the first presidents of the university, Lawrence Sullivan Ross, was described: Soldier (sword), Statesman (fasces), and Knightly Gentleman (knight's helm). To distinguish themselves, cadets in the band do not wear Corps Brass, instead wearing a small brass lyre device. In recent years, bandsmen often combine the lyre insignia with those of the U.S. Army infantry and field artillery branches (crossed rifles and crossed cannons, respectively) on some uniforms to reflect their affiliation with the Infantry or Artillery Bands (these designations having been reintroduced in 1976).

=== Corps Athletics ===
Corps athletic teams compete against university club teams across the nation in baseball, basketball, golf, lacrosse, marathon, soccer, tennis, and triathlon. Additionally, the Corps of Cadets Marksmanship Unit (CCMU) is the Corps competitive shooting team, partaking in competitions throughout the state of Texas and across the country. They compete in a wide variety of shooting fields, including the following: SASP, 3gun, Trap and Skeet, and USPSA. The selection process for new freshmen is very strenuous, with over 200 applicants and less than 15 are selected.

=== Unit awards ===
The following major awards are given annually in connection with the Corps Awards Program:

- Lieutenant General Ormond R. Simpson Award for Most Outstanding Color Guard
- United Services Automobile Association Award for Most Outstanding Major Unit Staff
- Commandant's Award and Flag for University Activity
- Robert M. Gates Public Service Award
- J.J. Sanchez Award and Flag for Recruiting and Retention
- George P. F. Jouine Award and Flag for Scholastic Achievement
- Major General Bruno A. Hochmuth Award and Flag for Military Achievement
- Taylor A. Gillespie Award and Flag for Most Improved Unit
- President's Award and Flag for the Most Outstanding Major Unit
- General George F. Moore Award, Plaque, and Flag for the Outstanding Unit

All awards are presented at the annually in the spring semester. Units awarded these honors are allowed to wear a citation cord and carry a flag to all events. At graduation, cadets may choose to wear any citation cord earned during their matriculation.

=== Senior boots ===
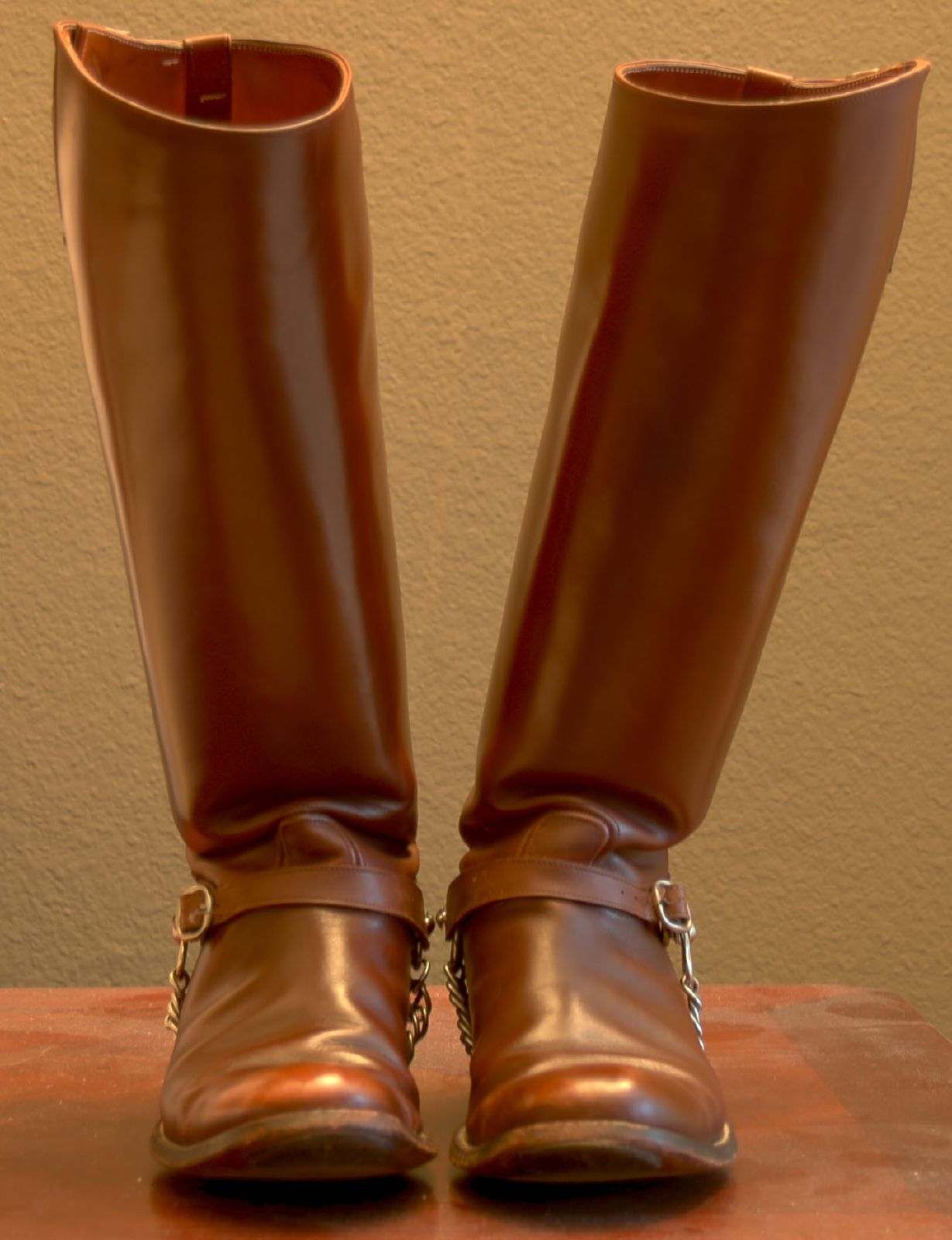
Senior boots

Within the Texas A&M Corps of Cadets, seniors are given the privilege to wear distinctive brown leather boots, known as "senior boots." These boots are one of the most visible and recognizable institutions of the Aggie Corps.

The tradition of senior boots came about in 1914, when the Corps of Cadets changed uniforms from the West Point style. The seniors wanted a way to differentiate themselves from the other classes, so they began wearing officer boots, which evolved into the senior boots worn today. By 1925, the boot style was integrated into the official cadet uniform, as a "knee-height officer boot, of a light brown or tan." Lucchese's bootery in San Antonio became the main supplier of boots.

By 1932, competition closer to campus sprang up. Joseph Holick, founder of the Fightin' Texas Aggie Band, opened Holick's that year, and his competition soon included Victor's, Russell's, and others. The average price for a pair of boots in 1932 was $32.50. During World War II, due to the leather diversion to the war effort, Aggie seniors had to buy or inherit their boots from former cadets. By 1977, the price had risen to $200. Today, senior boots are normally ordered during freshman year and cost $700 to $1,900, but 85% of seniors in the Corps still purchase them. Seniors also have the option to apply to borrow a donated pair of boots through prior-worn boots donations from former cadets.

To assist in removing their boots, seniors are allowed to yell "I need a fish!" at which point all available freshmen in the senior's outfit will race—and sometimes fight—to assist.

== Uniforms ==
A senior cadet in his midnight uniform wearing hanging medals and Service Cover (since 2012, hanging medals are no longer authorized for wear with Midnights)

A variety of uniforms are issued to a cadet, including summer and winter versions of daily uniforms, dress uniforms and field uniforms. The "Uniform of the Day" depends on the weather. For special occasions and events, the uniform is specified in the Field Order or invitation for the event. Special Corps units have special uniforms, such as the Ross Volunteers, the Fish Drill Team and Parsons Mounted Cavalry.

=== Uniform components ===
Category	Name	Description
Headgear	Garrison cap	Tan or dark tan cover
Headgear	Service cover	Dark green crown and brass Corps Stack with a tan band, brown visor and strap. Seniors wear a gold band to represent cadet officer rank.
Headgear	Campaign cover	Dark green, with Corps Stack and class color cord and "acorns" (seniors wear a gold braid). Also known as a Howdy Hat, Smokey-the-Bear Hat, or Drill Sergeant Hat.
Headgear	Army Combat Uniform cover	Rank is centered on the crown
Shirts	Class B Summer	Short-sleeve tan shirt with two breast pockets and a yoke with three points pointed downward on the back. Worn with a white T-shirt.
Shirts	Class B Winter	Long-sleeve version of the Class B Summer shirt.
Shirts	Midnights	Dark green version of the Class B Winter shirt.
Shirts	Class C (Army Combat Uniform (ACU))	Camouflage long-sleeved blouse with rank centered on chest. Worn with a sand colored T-shirt.
Shirts	Class D	Unit-specific T-shirt or grey/maroon Corps sweatshirt with Corps logo.
Jackets	Class A coat	A dark olive green, belted, four-pocket military coat.
Jackets	Black jackets	A black jacket worn over other uniforms. Rank is displayed on the epaulettes.
Jackets	Overcoat	A dark tan overcoat used in inclement weather and can be worn over any uniform.
Jackets	Letterman's sweater	Grey or white sweater with maroon trim or a maroon sweater indicating Juniors and Seniors who have participated in varsity sports (including band members, yell leaders, and Singing Cadets) Members of the fish Drill Team earn a letter sweater and may wear it as Sophomores.
Trousers	Summer	Straight-legged trousers made from the same color and material as the summer shirts. Seniors' pants are jodhpurs made in the same color and material.
Trousers	Winter	Darker and heavier trousers than the summer pants. Seniors' pants are jodhpurs made in the same color and material.
Trousers	Class C	Army Combat Uniform trousers
Trousers	Class D	Grey or black shorts or grey Corps sweatpants.
Footwear	Brown low-quarter shoes	These are not permitted to be patent leather. They are worn with brown socks. Women may wear neutral-color hose when wearing a skirt.
Footwear	Combat boots	Tan combat boots that conform with U.S. military regulations. They are worn with green/gray boot socks.
Footwear	Senior boots	These cavalry riding boots are a privilege reserved for seniors. Most seniors purchase them from one of several local companies; they can also be rented from the Corps Museum, or sometimes, seniors wear the boots a family member wore before them.
Belts and Buckles	Freshman belt	Brown cotton with standard army-issue brass buckle.
Belts and Buckles	Sophomore Belt	Brown nylon with flat, two-clamp, no tab brass buckle.
Belts and Buckles	Junior Belt	White cotton with flat, two-clamp, no tab brass buckle with the Corps Stack.
Belts and Buckles	Senior Belt	White nylon with flat, two-clamp, no tab brass buckle with the Army Crest. Seniors in the Navy ROTC may wear ship and unit buckles for non-inspection daily wear.
Other	Sam Browne Belt	A wide calfskin belt with matching shoulder strap connected by brass pins, buckles, and hooks used for carrying a saber. May be worn without a saber for formal events when weapons are inappropriate. Typically this item is reserved for seniors serving in a command capacity.
Other	White cotton gloves	Worn for formal functions. A rubberized gripping surface on the outer surface of the palms are authorized only for those carrying sabres, guidons, flags, or bugles.

=== Uniform combinations ===
Name	Description
Class A	Green coat, long-sleeve tan shirt, black tie, dark tan trousers, green service cap, black low-quarter shoes.
Class B Summer	Short sleeve tan shirt, light tan trousers, tan garrison cap, black low-quarter shoes or senior boots.
Class B Winter	Long sleeve tan shirt, dark tan winter trousers, black necktie, dark tan garrison cap, black low-quarter shoes or senior boots.
Class B Midnights	Green long-sleeve shirt, dark tan winter trousers, tan tie, dark tan garrison cap or green service hat, black low-quarter shoes or senior boots (since 2012, only juniors and seniors are authorized to wear Midnights).
Class C	Army Combat Uniform
Physical Training Gear	

== Rank ==
The rank structure of the Cadet Corps is generally based on the Army ROTC cadet rank structure. Today, the ranks are divided by class and, unlike at some other military schools, at Texas A&M a cadet can never be demoted such that a person of a lower class outranks him/her, although this has not always been true. Up through the early 1950s many senior and junior cadets held private rank, although they were accorded privileges and respect commensurate with their class rather than by their rank. Unlike most of the personnel in the U.S. Armed Forces, the rank is always a piece of metal approximately 1 square inch in size affixed to the uniform much like a tie tack, but is never cloth rank sewn onto the fabric.

Freshmen are considered Cadet Privates and, as such, wear no rank, just a brass "A.M.U." symbolizing their affiliation with Texas A&M University. Sophomores hold the ranks of Cadet Private First Class, Cadet Corporal or Cadet Sergeant. Juniors are given cadet NCO rank (Sergeant through Sergeant Major of the Corps) and seniors are Cadet Officers (from Cadet 2nd Lieutenant through Cadet Colonel of the Corps).

The highest-ranking member of the Corps is the school's official mascot, Reveille X. By decree from the US Army after World War II, Reveille holds the honorary rank of Cadet General. The female American collie is the "First Lady" of Texas A&M and is present at all Texas A&M football games and also attends other A&M functions.

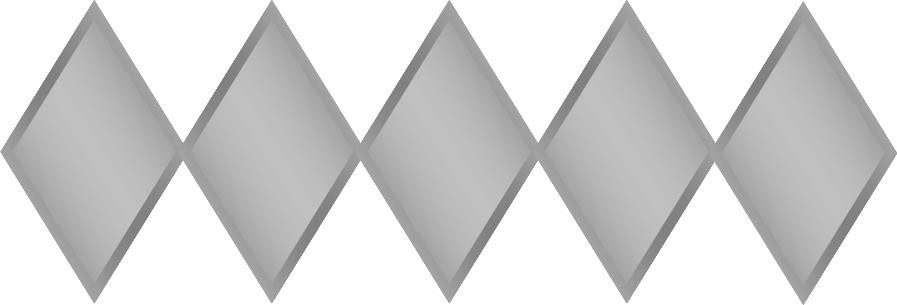
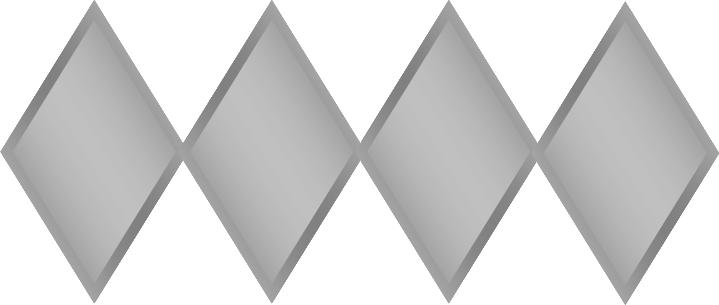
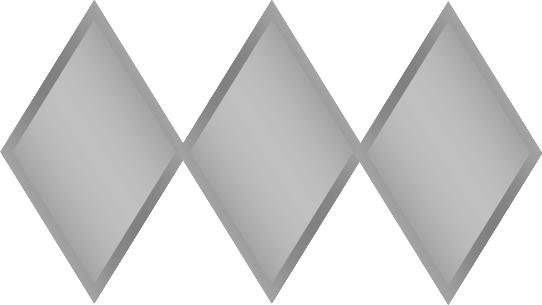
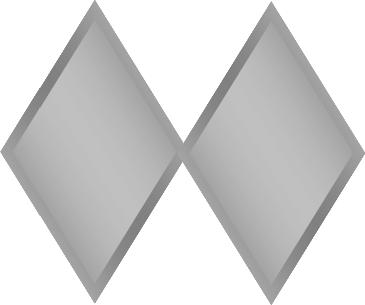
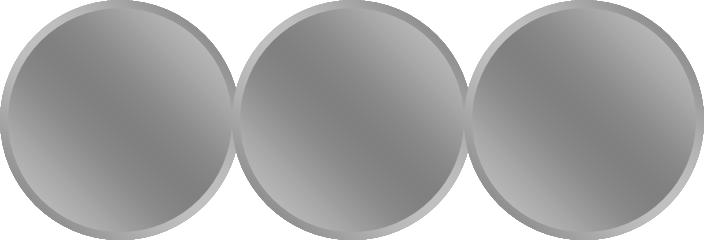
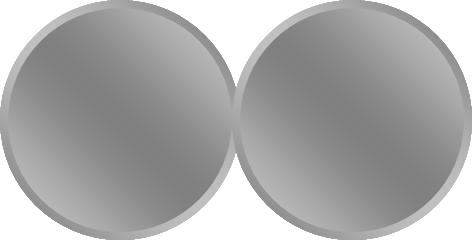
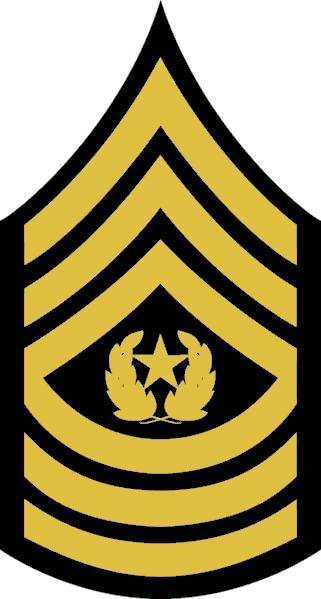
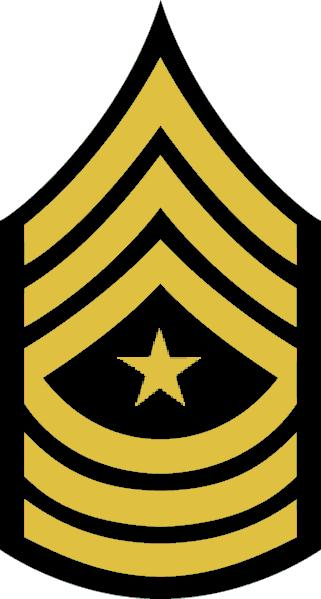
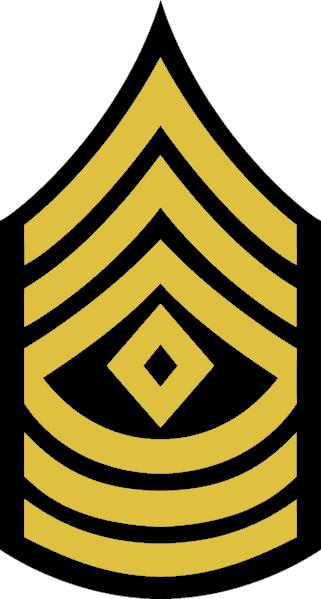
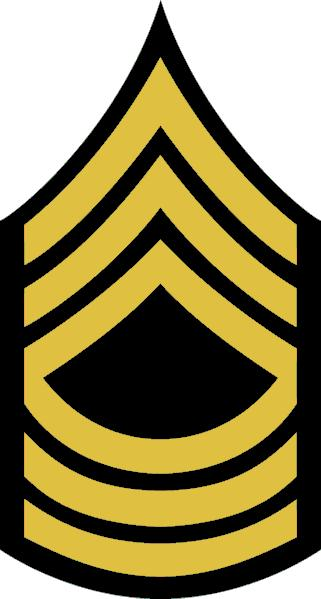
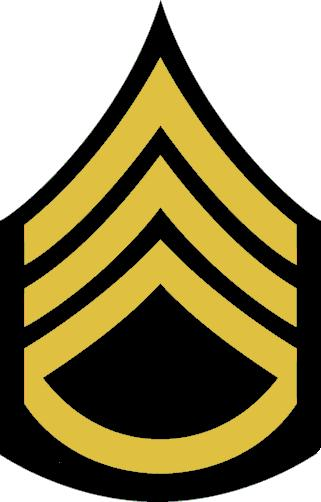
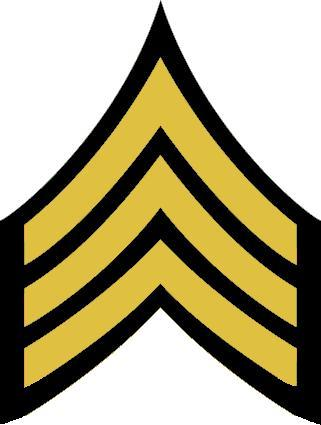
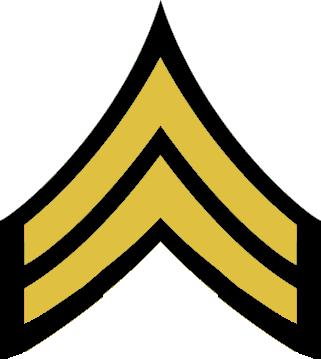
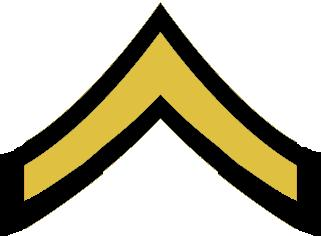
Insignia
Rank		Cadet General^{1}	Cadet Colonel of the Corps	Cadet Colonel	Cadet Lieutenant Colonel	Cadet Major	Cadet Captain	Cadet 1st Lieutenant	Cadet 2nd Lieutenant
Insignia										NONE
Rank	Cadet Sergeant Major of the Corps	Cadet Sergeant Major	Cadet First Sergeant	Cadet Master Sergeant	Cadet Sergeant First Class	Cadet Staff Sergeant	Cadet Sergeant	Cadet Corporal	Cadet Private First Class	Cadet Private ("fish")
^{1}Honorary title held only by Reveille

== Associations ==
=== Texas Aggie Corps of Cadets Association ===
The Corps of Cadets Association is the official fundraising organization for the Texas A&M Corps of Cadets. A membership-based 501(c)(3) non-profit corporation, the CCA serves as one of Texas A&M University's designated five pillars of giving and is the number one source of private funding for Corps programs and events. The CCA helps recruit and retain cadets by funding over fifty programs, special units, and events that crosscut the Corps as a whole. In addition to supporting the Corps, member benefits include the Association’s celebrated quarterly publication, The Guidon, monthly e-newsletters, and access to exclusive web-based products.

The Corps of Cadets Association was chartered on April 21, 1993 as a 501 (c)(3) non-profit corporation in the State of Texas. The Corps Recruiting Program, established in 1988 by order of Commandant Major General Thomas Darling was the first organized and professional recruiting for the Corps. Four years later, funds were raised to create the Corps Leadership Outreach Program which would support for the program. These organizations led to the founding of the Corps of Cadets Association, which assumed those functions in its charter.

=== Texas Aggie Band Association ===
The Texas Aggie Band Association was formed in the 1970s for the primary purpose of supporting the Texas Aggie Band. It is a 501(c)(3) non-profit organization, membership-based and led by volunteers. Focused on supporting the Band, the association funds Texas A&M Foundation scholarships for bandsmen, sponsors certain Band-unique events, and provides direct financial aid to the Office of the Director of Bands.

In the past year the association has funded a $120,000 endowment for Bugles & Banners, almost $40k in scholarships, tutoring, band sweaters, senior awards, & dinner, fish practice t-shirts, travel polos, drum major's brass plating, and more.

== See also ==
- Texas A&M Singing Cadets
- Virginia Tech Corps of Cadets
- MSC Student Conference on National Affairs
- Texan Corps of Cadets
