= Parsons Mounted Cavalry =

Student organization at Texas A&M

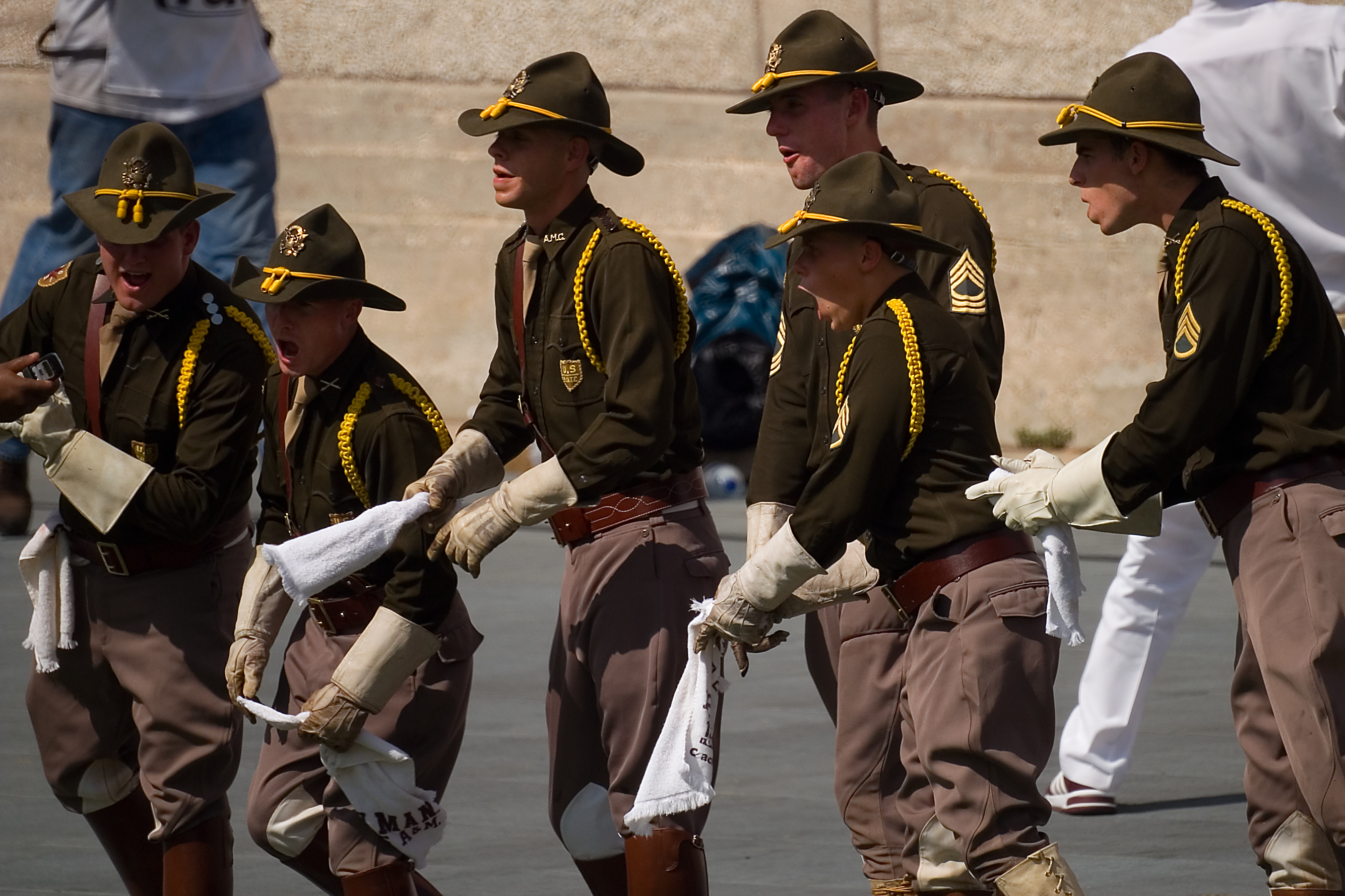
- Active: 1973–present
- Country: United States
- Allegiance: Texas
- Type: Cavalry
- Role: Public duties
- Size: 90 cadets 60 horses 6 mules
- Part of: Texas A&M University Corps of Cadets
- Garrison/HQ: Fiddler’s Green, College Station, Texas
- Nickname: Cav
- Colors: Yellow
- Website: https://pmc.tamu.edu/

Commanders
- Military Advisor: Dr. Darin Paine
- Commanding Officer: Hunter Mayfield
- Executive Officer: Aaron Vuytecki
- First Sergeant: Tibor Widman

The Parsons Mounted Cavalry (PMC) is a cavalry unit of the Texas A&M Corps of Cadets which serves as the only mounted ROTC cavalry unit in the country. This horse combat unit consists of cavalry, artillery and quartermaster elements. The unit represents Texas A&M University at football games, parades, agricultural, and equestrian events throughout Texas, notably firing a field cannon at home football games when their team scores. There are 90 junior and senior cadets and 50 horses in this unit.

== History ==
=== Background ===
PMC traces its origins to the early years of Texas A&M when mounted drill training was a fundamental part of military education. However, this practice ceased in 1943 with the disbandment of the United States Cavalry Branch by the United States Army. The initiative to revive the cavalry tradition was revived at A&M by the junior Class of 1974, in the spring of 1973. That semester, three cadets, Michael Collins, Darrell Williams, and Douglas Latimer, proposed reviving mounted drill training to then Commandant of Cadets. Colonel Thomas R. Parsons. The unit was named after Parsons, who was the only active-duty Commandant at Texas A&M. The unit made its debut in the Corps' march-in at the Wichita State football game in September 1973. Collins served as the unit's first Commanding Officer, with Williams as the Executive Officer and Latimer as a Platoon Leader. By the 1981–1982 academic year, PMC proudly welcomed its first female member.

It has worked with horsemen of the 1st Cavalry Division.

== Organization ==
The command of the company consists of the following individuals:

- Commanding Officer
- Executive Officer
- First Sergeant
- Staff Officers
  - Section Chief
  - Artillery Officer
  - Muleskinner
  - Administration Officer
  - Operations and Logistics Officer
  - Training Officer
  - Pisshead ("Sophomore") Training Officer
  - Public Relations
  - Weapons Officer
  - Supply Officer
  - Game Day Officer
  - Stablemaster
  - Leather Officer
  - Veterinary Officer
  - Chaplain

The unit is broken into three of the following basic units:

- 1st Platoon
- 2nd Platoon
- Half-Section

Each platoon is further subdivided into two squads.

== Stables ==
In 1979, it relocated from the Research Annex to a new facility adjacent to Texas A&M University's Vet School, which in 1981, was named "Fiddler’s Green." The name pays homage to a poignant poem embraced by U.S. Army cavalry formations in the late 1800s, which portrayed an idyllic paradise. In 2014, a substantial expansion initiative nearly doubled the original 26-acre space, elevating the total acreage to an impressive 50 acres.

== Spirit of '02 ==
The Half Section (responsible for Field Artillery and Mule Team elements) maintains the "Spirit of '02", a 3-inch M1902 field gun found in the fall of 1974 at a Aggie Bonfire cut site near Easterwood Airport. The gun is driven by a 4 horse team and a restored caisson to Kyle Field and fired during all home football games, midnight yell practice, and other special events. While Aggie lore states the gun was the runaway that tumbled over a ridge in the film We've Never Been Licked, there is no conclusive evidence. It is affectionately known as "The Spirit of ‘02," in honor of its 1902 origins.

== Association ==
The PMC Association is a non-profit organization designed to support those in PMC.

== See also ==
- 3rd Infantry Regiment
- National Lancers
- Texas Military Forces

== Notes ==
- PMC Association
