= Herbert H. Sargent =

American colonel (1858–1921)

Herbert Howland Sargent
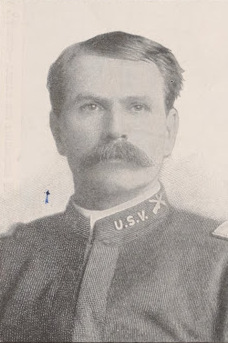
- Sargent in 1898
- Born: September 29, 1858; Carlinville, Illinois, U.S.
- Died: September 16, 1921 (aged 62); Jacksonville, Oregon, U.S.
- Burial place: Jacksonville Cemetery, Jacksonville, Oregon, U.S.
- Education: United States Military Academy
- Spouse: Alice C. Applegate (m. 1886)
- Military career
- Allegiance: United States
- Branch: United States Army
- Service years: 1879–1911; 1916–1918
- Rank: Colonel (Volunteers); Lieutenant Colonel
- Unit: 2nd Cavalry Regiment
- Commands: 5th Volunteer Infantry Regiment
- Conflicts: Spanish-American War; Filipino-American War: Luzon campaign; Battle of San Mateo

Herbert Howland Sargent was an American colonel, military professor and author during the Spanish-American War and the Filipino-American War. He was known for his effective leadership and training of the 5th Volunteer Infantry Regiment, being notable for its efficiency and well-disciplined soldiers. He was also a historian of the Napoleonic Wars, writing several acclaimed works about its events.

== Early career ==
Herbert was born on September 29, 1858, as the son of Jacob True and Maria Lucretia (née Bayley) Sargent at Carlinville, Illinois. Sargent enrolled in the United States Military Academy from July 1, 1879, to June 13, 1883, when he graduated as a Second Lieutenant on June 13, 1883, within the 2nd Cavalry Regiment. He was then sent on Frontier service at Fort Assinniboine, Minnesota from September 28, 1883, until June 3, 1884, when he was briefly transferred to Fort Klamath, Oregon on August 16, 1886. Around the same time, he married Alice C. Applegate on August 11, 1886. Sargent then served as a professor of Military Science and Tactics at the University of Illinois from August 29, 1886, to August 31, 1887. He then returned to serve in the Frontier, serving at Fort Bidwell, California on October 20, 1888, and then to Fort Walla Walla in July 1890 and promoted to First Lieutenant on June 19, 1890. He was then sent to Arizona in November 1894 and Colorado in June 1895 where he was appointed Regimental Quartermaster on June 13, 1895.

== Spanish-American War ==
After being sent to New Mexico in April 1898, the Spanish-American War broke out and despite initially declining promotion to Major of Volunteers and as an Adjutant General, Sargent was then made Colonel of the newly formed 5th Volunteer Infantry Regiment on May 20, 1898, and raised the regiment at Columbus, Mississippi. The regiment was then ordered for Santiago de Cuba on August 6, 1898, and so the regiment went to Savannah, Georgia on August 8 and arrived four days later. Upon arriving at Cuba, the 5th Volunteer Infantry remained in camp for eight months at the outskirts of the city as the regiment played a role in guarding government property during the city's siege. In March 1899, the regiment took command of the District of Guantanamo and Sargent was acting military governor until May 2 when the Regiment returned to Camp Meade and was mustered out on May 31, 1899. Around this time, Sargent was praised by General Leonard Wood for the discipline his soldiers had and how efficient they were at performing their tasks.

== Filipino-American War ==
After being mustered out of volunteer service, he was promoted to Lieutenant Colonel on July 5, 1899, while commanding the 19th Volunteer Infantry Regiment at Fort McPherson. Upon the outbreak of the Filipino-American War, Sargent departed for Manila on October 5, 1899, and arrived there on November 2 and initially fought the insurgents across Luzon. He then participated in the Battle of San Mateo where he witnessed the death of General Henry Ware Lawton and was commended by Major General Elwell Stephen Otis "for the skill and bravery he displayed in the difficult San Mateo affair" which made Sargent considered for a brevet within the Regular Army. He would serve his final post in the war as the Judge Advocate General of the Department of Southern Luzon from July 1900 to July 1901 before being honorably discharged on May 10, 1901.

== Later career ==
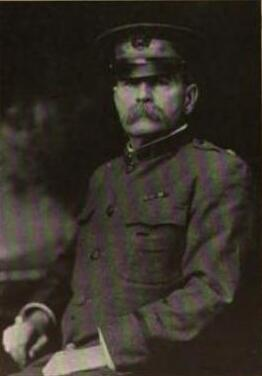
Sargent during his re-enlistment in 1918.

Upon returning to the United States in July 1901, he would meet up with the 2nd Cavalry Regiment at Matanzas, Matanzas Province and would serve there as well as Fort Ethan Allen until the Summer of 1903 when he then became a professor of Military Science and Tactics at the Agricultural and Mechanical College of Texas from September 21, 1903, to September 15, 1907. He then commanded the 2nd Cavalry Regiment at Fort Des Moines and took part in the Ute Campaign of the fall of 1907. He then attended the War College of Washington, D.C. from August 1908 to November 1909 when he graduated and was promoted to Major of the 2nd Cavalry Regiment on January 8, 1909. He would then return to the Philippines to command Camp Overton, Lanao del Norte and Torrey Bks. from January 1910 to June 1911 when he returned to the United States on July. Sargent retired on November 17, 1911, due to disability contracted from duty.

Sargent lived in Medford, Oregon from 1911 to November 1915 during which he was made a Councilman from 1914 to 1915 until his move to Jacksonville, Oregon when he was made the Chairman of the Progressive Party within Jackson County, Oregon from 1914 to 1915. Upon the American entry into World War I, Sargent re-enlisted in military service on June 27, 1916, and was recommended for promotion to Brigadier General by former President Roosevelt and 24 other officers. He would serve as the assistant to the Department Quartermaster of the Western Department at San Francisco, California until September 25, 1917, when he was made a professor of Military Studies and Tactics at Princeton University on March 25, 1918, succeeding Brigadier General Stuart Heintzelman. He was promoted to Lieutenant Colonel on May 23, 1918, until his final retirement on July 9, 1918. In the Christmas of 1920 at Medford, Sargent was involved in a prank where the Mail Tribune described the incident:

Some wags had downtown Medford convulsed with laughter this forenoon with an ante-Christmas Day prank which partook of the April fool variety and made many citizens feel cheap. They had a big paper sack stuffed with paper from the ends of which stuck out prominently turkey legs and the head of a turkey, which they placed in the middle of the street car track opposite the Postal Telegraph company office. It looked for all the world as tho a big fat turkey had dropped out of some passing delivery wagon or auto, and most people – pedestrians on the sidewalks, or riders in cars – passing by thought so, and bit accordingly. Of course after lifting the package each realized that he had been sold without hearing the loud guffaws of laughter which came from the waiting crowd on the sidewalk, grinned foolishly and then joined the crowd to witness the next victim's surprise. Among those who bit hard were Chief of Police Timothy, Sheriff Terrill, Colonel H. H. Sargent, and Romeo Koppes.

Sargent would die on September 16, 1921, and would be buried at the Jacksonville Cemetery.

== Career as an Author ==
Sargent's other career was working as a non-fiction author on military history events. His first two notable works were about Napoleon Bonaparte's early career and the Battle of Marengo titled Napoleon Bonaparte's First Campaign (1894) and The Campaign of Marengo (1897) respectively. He also wrote about the Spanish-American War, publishing three volumes in a series titled The Campaign of Santiago de Cuba which earned personal compliments from fellow veteran and president Theodore Roosevelt.
