= Reveille (dog) =

Texas A&M mascot

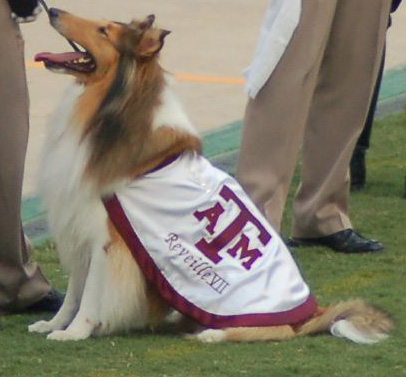
- Reveille VII in 2006
- University: Texas A&M University
- Conference: SEC
- Description: Rough Collie
- First seen: 1931

Reveille /ˈrɛvəli/ is the official mascot of Texas A&M University. Students adopted the first Reveille, a mixed-breed dog, in 1931. The cadets raised $100 during World War II to make Reveille a general, as part of a fundraiser for the K-9 Corps. Reveille is the highest-ranking member of the Texas A&M Corps of Cadets as she is the only cadet to have five silver diamonds.

Eight years after the first Reveille died, a graduate of the university donated a Shetland Sheepdog to be the second official Aggie mascot, Reveille II. The third Reveille was the first to be a purebred Rough Collie; all subsequent mascots have belonged to this breed. Reveille IV, V, VI, VII, VIII, and IX died in 1989, 1999, 2003, 2013, 2018, 2025 respectively. Reveille IX served from May 9, 2015, until her retirement on April 30, 2021. The current mascot, Reveille X, assumed her role as mascot on April 30, 2021, during the Corps of Cadets Final Review. All Reveilles to date have been female.

When they die, the Reveilles are buried in a special cemetery located outside the north end of Kyle Field. The bodies are laid facing the south end zone and the scoreboard. After the addition to Kyle Field was built at the north end, blocking the view of the scoreboard, a small scoreboard was placed outside the stadium, named the Reveille Scoreboard, so the tradition could live on.

== Reveille I ==
Reveille I (died January 18, 1944)

Reveille I

In January 1931, several members of the Fightin' Texas Aggie Band were returning from a party in nearby Navasota, Texas, when they unexpectedly hit a small black and white stray mutt. They brought the dog with them, and smuggled her into Legett Hall, fully intending to take her to the vet school the next day. The next morning, her presence was made apparent when "Reveille" was blown by a bugler and the dog began barking, hence Reveille became her name. Although it was against the rules to keep pets in the dorms, the cadets fell in love with the dog and kept her anyway.

During the opening of football season, Reveille was named official mascot when she led the band onto Kyle Field for a half-time performance. She would wear a jacket with A&M colors and pace the sidelines during games.

Due to the quantity of officers and soldiers Texas A&M contributed to the US Armed Forces in World War II, Reveille was given the honorary title of Cadet General by the U.S. Army. Since that time, Reveille has worn the rank of Cadet General (5 diamonds). Since 5 diamonds are not manufactured, cadets align Cadet Lieutenant Colonel and Cadet Colonel rank on her uniform.

Upon her death on January 18, 1944, she received a formal military funeral on the fifty yard line in Kyle Field and then was buried at the north entrance facing the scoreboard so that she can always watch the Aggies play.

== Reveille II ==
Reveille II (ca. 1952 – August 23, 1966) Reveille II was the second official Aggie mascot. Eight years after the first Reveille died, the student body attempted to raise money to purchase a new mascot. After they failed to raise enough, Arthur Weinert, a graduate of the Class of 1900, donated a Shetland Sheepdog to the students in 1952. Named Reveille II, the new unofficial mascot was cared for by the Fightin' Texas Aggie Band from 1952 to 1954. During the summer of 1954, a student found Reveille II wandering loose around campus. He and a classmate cared for her and then took her home with them for the rest of the summer. During the fall semester, she lived with one of the students, Sam Netterville, in his dorm room.

The university at the time refused to pay for the mascot's care. Netterville convinced the student senate to pass a resolution stating that Reveille's care would be provided by his unit, A Quartermaster Company. The unit asked fellow students to donate money towards her but took responsibility for her daily needs.

Netterville took Reveille with him everywhere, including classes, thus launching the tradition of the mascot being escorted at all times. "Miss Rev," as they called her, marched with the Aggie Band at football games, but had a habit of relieving herself on the football field. Students often placed bets as to which yard line she would choose.

Reveille II died in 1966 of kidney failure and arthritis.

== Reveille III ==
Reveille III (died May 31, 1975) Reveille III was the first of the Texas A&M mascots to be a pure-bred Rough Collie. She served as mascot from 1966 through 1975.

== Reveille IV ==
Reveille IV (died March 29, 1989) Reveille IV served as Texas A&M mascot from 1975–1984. Over 10,000 mourners attended her funeral on April 9. She was donated by veterinarian Tom Godwin of Deer Park, Texas, a member of the class of 1967.

== Reveille V ==
Reveille V (August 29, 1984 – June 25, 1999) Reveille V was a descendant of a championship purebred Rough Collie. She was chosen to be the mascot from a pool of 2000 puppies because of her lineage and her markings. In December 1984, Reveille V was brought to the Texas A&M campus, and her first official appearance as mascot came at a basketball game on January 11, 1985. During her tenure, she attended every Texas A&M football game with one exception. During the 1987 corps trip, TCU officials refused to allow the Aggie mascot into the TCU stadium, citing a regulation disallowing live mascots at home games. She attended many home basketball, baseball, and volleyball games. A mischievous dog, Reveille V often stole erasers from chalkboards during class.

In early November 1993, Reveille V underwent emergency surgery for gastric volvulus, which causes an animal's stomach to twist out of place. The surgery was successful, and she made a full recovery. Later that month she relinquished her spot as mascot to Reveille VI. For the next six years she lived with a local veterinarian and graduate of Texas A&M, Joe West. Reveille V was euthanized in June 1999 because she suffered from arthritis and a neurological disorder. Her funeral was delayed until September to enable students to attend. Over 3,000 students and alumni attended the funeral, which included "Taps", a prayer from a campus chaplain, and eulogies from her former handlers. Reveille V was initially buried at Cain Park on the Texas A&M campus, but her grave was relocated to the north end of Kyle Field once stadium renovations were finished.

== Reveille VI ==
Reveille VI (September 3, 1993 – October 18, 2003) Reveille VI was a registered Rough Collie born in Woodward, Oklahoma, and took over as Texas A&M's mascot from Reveille V during halftime of the football game against the University of Louisville on November 13, 1993. Upon induction into the Aggie family, she quickly assumed the roles and duties of her predecessor and began attending university functions including football games.

Shortly after beginning her duties, Reveille was kidnapped by a group of University of Texas students led by Neil Andrew Sheffield. For almost a week, Texas A&M denied that the mascot had been stolen. After the school finally acknowledged her disappearance and released a statement that they were planning to press felony charges against whoever took her, Reveille was tied to a sign post near Lake Travis and an anonymous caller informed the police of her location. She was returned unharmed to Texas A&M and resumed her duties. Reveille VI became a movie star in the 1996 film Reveille, My Life as the Aggie Mascot. She was in attendance with the Aggie football team during their first Big 12 Championship in 1998, and celebrated alongside President George W. Bush at the inaugural ball in Washington, D.C., in 2001.

In 1996, she was diagnosed with idiopathic epilepsy and later arthritis. Although for the next four years she was able to resist her ailments and continue with her duties as mascot, these health problems would eventually lead to her early retirement in May 2001.

She was retired on May 12, 2001, into the care of Charlie Hall, who served as the veterinarian for Reveilles IV, V and VI. She celebrated her 10th birthday on September 3, 2003, at a party hosted by Hall and his wife, Diana. Reveille VI was in declining health and was said to be taking nine different pills and two forms of liquid medications each day to help combat seizures and other problems.

Six weeks later, on October 18, 2003, Reveille VI was euthanized. The decision was made by Hall and other Texas A&M veterinarians because of her deteriorating health. Funeral services were held Sunday, November 2, 2003, at Kyle Field. Speakers at her funeral were former mascot corporals Mark Boynton, Class of 1997, and Jeff Bailey, Class of 2000. Following the funeral service, Reveille VI was buried among earlier Reveilles at the north entrance to Kyle Field.

== Reveille VII ==
Reveille VII (October 9, 2000 – May 30, 2013) Reveille VII was a registered Rough Collie born in Argent Kennel, which is part of the Animal Hospital of Ft. Lauderdale. She was donated to Texas A&M by Cindi Bossart, VMD, her husband Jim Efron and breeder Nancy MacDonald. Reveille arrived on campus on February 16, 2001, and officially took over duties from Reveille VI at the Corps of Cadets Final Review on May 12, 2001.

At a pre-game performance at the Texas A&M-TCU game in December, Reveille's nervous, high-pitched barks could be heard above the band. It was decided by administrators and the Corps of Cadets that she be sent to obedience school. She worked closely with her professional trainer, Kay Stephens, and her newly appointed mascot corporal throughout the summer for her return for football season. Despite several stints in obedience school, Reveille's manners at times needed work. Though other incidents have been suspected, in 2007, it was reported that Reveille VII bit her handler after having her tail stepped on during a morning run. On February 13, 2008, her impending retirement at the end of the school year was announced at a news conference at the Corps Center. In the summer of 2008, she began her retirement at the age of 7 living with two other dogs under the care of Paul and Tina Gardner in Wellborn, Texas.

Texas A&M University president R. Bowen Loftin reported via Twitter that Reveille VII died on May 30, 2013, at home in Aggieland.

== Reveille VIII ==
Reveille VIII (died June 25, 2018) assumed her duties as the official mascot of Texas A&M University in August 2008, just before the fall semester, following the retirement of her predecessor at the conclusion of the spring semester. She was introduced formally at the August 31, 2008, season-opening football game at Kyle Field.

A May 1, 2008, memo released by Dean L. Bresciani revealed some of the features of the new dog. She would be a mature female, meaning she would be at least a year and a half old. The special committee assigned to look for Reveille VIII looked for a mascot that would be medium to large size, healthy, have an upbeat personality, be at ease around crowds and like people, be able to be calm around loud noises, and be positively motivated, as well as not highly reactive. Perhaps most importantly, to prevent the behavioral problems seen in Reveille VII, “professional training protocols and oversight [are to] be established, implemented, and periodically evaluated, [and will include] a transition period to help Reveille successfully acclimate to and carry out her role as the mascot of Texas A&M University.”

On August 11, 2008, Texas A&M University announced the selection of Reveille VIII, a two-year-old female Rough Collie, formerly named Kelly. She was donated by the Rough Collie breeders Julie Hinrichsen and Russell Dyke, owners of Juell Collies in Topeka, Kansas. In compensation for the new mascot, Texas A&M Corps of Cadets donated $5000 in private donations to the Collie Club of America and the former owners donated $1000.

In September 2014, it was announced that Reveille VIII would retire at the end of spring semester and once a successor was found. She was then moved to Stevenson Companion Animal Life Care Center on the campus of Texas A&M.

Reveille VIII died June 25, 2018.

== Reveille IX ==
Reveille IX (November 22, 2013 – September 27, 2025) was officially announced by Texas A&M University on Tuesday, March 10, 2015, and assumed her role on May 9, 2015. Reveille IX was donated by Overland Collies, based in Chagrin Falls, Ohio, a Cleveland suburb. The establishment's owners, Marcy and Mike Fine, are typically well represented among finalists at the annual Collie Nationals. Reveille IX maintained a Twitter following where she tweeted about 'her Aggies.' On February 5, 2021, Texas A&M announced that Reveille IX would be retiring in May 2021. On April 30, 2021, Reveille IX officially retired and resided on campus at the Stevenson Companion Animal Life-Care Center. Reveille IX died on September 27, 2025, after complications from pneumonia.

== Reveille X ==
Reveille X (born September 5, 2019) officially assumed Mascot duties on April 30, 2021. She was donated by the Rough Collie breeders Julie Hinrichsen and Russell Dyke, the same breeders who donated Reveille VIII. On July 23, 2025, the university announced that Reveille X had undergone surgery to remove her right eye in order to relieve discomfort from glaucoma.

== Daily life ==
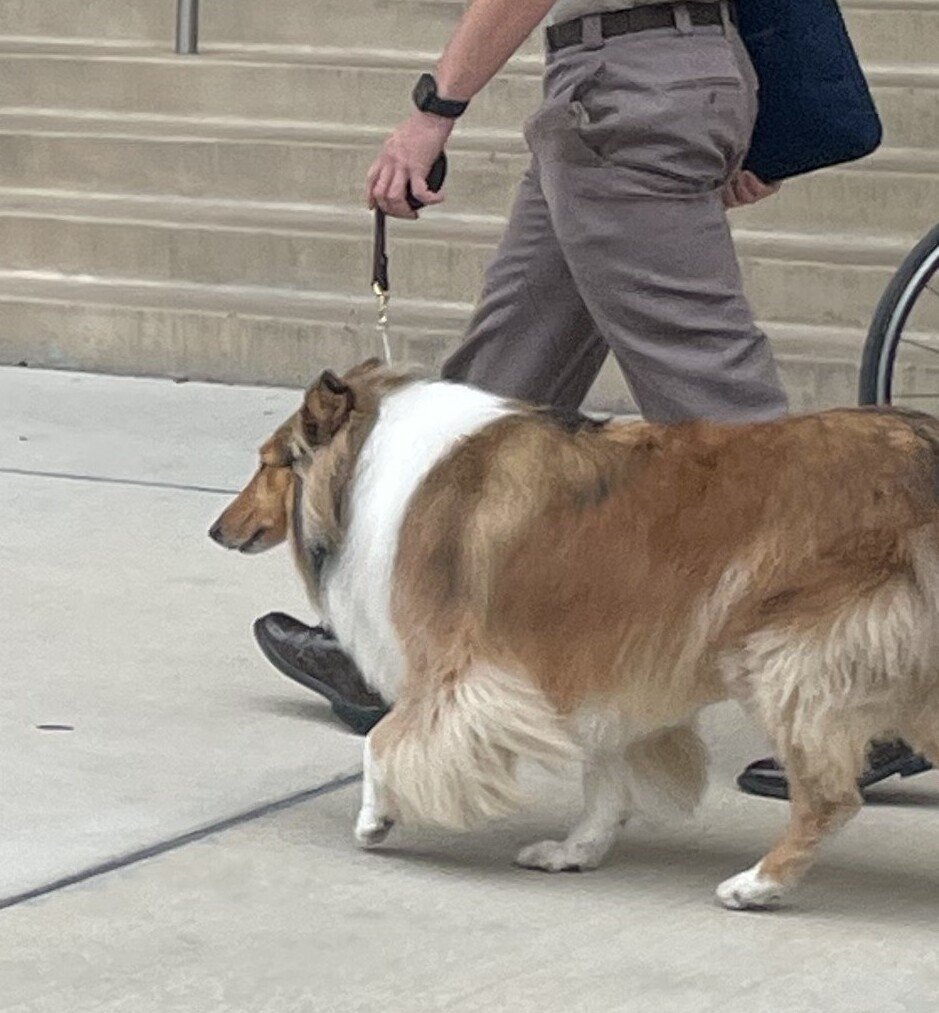
Reveille with her handler

Reveille is officially cared for by Corps of Cadets Company E-2, known as the "mascot company", and the 1959 successor to A Quartermaster Co. A sophomore in the unit is designated the "mascot corporal" and has ultimate responsibility for her care. Reveille accompanies the mascot corporal everywhere, including to class and on dates.

Reveille is considered a cadet general and the highest-ranking member in the Corps of Cadets. To designate her rank, Reveille wears five diamonds on her maroon-and-white blanket. Freshmen cadets are required to address her as "Miss Rev, ma'am." Reveille is the only canine on campus, other than service animals, that is permitted to enter any campus building. It is a widely held tradition that if Reveille decides to sleep on a cadet's bed, that cadet is required to sleep on the floor. However, in reality, she is constantly under the care of her handler and is not permitted to freely roam the dormitory or campus. This tradition likely applied only to the first Reveille. By tradition, if she barks in class, that session is cancelled. Reveille has her own cell phone and golf cart, Rev Force One, both operated by the mascot corporal, and her own student identification card.

== Cemetery ==
The Reveille Cemetery

The Cemetery Plaque

Texas A&M maintains a cemetery on campus where all of the past Reveilles are buried. Reveilles I through IV were buried side by side in a small cemetery in front of Kyle Field with their noses and paws pointed so that they could look through the north tunnel and see the stadium scoreboard. This way, "they can always watch the Aggies outscore their opponent on the field."

In 1997, the university decided to expand Kyle Field and build the Bernard C. Richardson Zone at the north end of the stadium. This necessitated the removal of the cemetery. After meeting with representatives of the Traditions Council, Student Senate, and E-2, the athletic department decided to create a temporary cemetery across the street in Cain Park. Upon completion of the stadium addition in 1999, the graves were relocated to a permanent cemetery at the new, tree-lined Richardson Zone Plaza. Since the recent additions blocked the gravesites' view of Kyle Field, a miniature scoreboard was constructed on the outside of the stadium so that the deceased mascots can still watch the Aggies play.

== See also ==
- Jiggs II
- Traditions of Texas A&M University
- List of individual dogs
