= Horace S. Carswell Jr. =

United States Army Air Forces Medal of Honor recipient

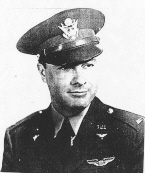
- Major Horace S. Carswell Jr.
- Born: July 18, 1916; Fort Worth, Texas
- Died: October 26, 1944 (aged 28) near South China Sea
- Burial place: Major Horace Seaver “Stump” Carswell Jr. was buried in 1944 at Tungchen, China. In 1945 he was reburied at the American Military Cemetery at Kunming, China. In 1947 he was reburied in Hawaii. In 1948 he was reburied in Rose Hill Cemetery in east Fort Worth. Finally, in 1986 his remains were moved to Carswell Air Force Base. 1993 moved to Oakwood Cemetery by the base. Carswell AirForce Based was closing.
- Military career
- Allegiance: United States of America
- Branch: U.S. Army Air Forces
- Service years: 1940–1944
- Rank: Major
- Nickname: Stump
- Units: 374th Bombardment Squadron, 308th Bombardment Group
- Conflicts: World War II
- Awards: Medal of Honor; Distinguished Service Cross; Distinguished Flying Cross; Purple Heart; Air Medal

Horace Seaver "Stump" Carswell Jr. (July 18, 1916 – October 26, 1944) was a United States Army major who was killed in action while serving as a member of the Army Air Forces during World War II. He was posthumously awarded the Medal of Honor.

He is the namesake of Carswell Air Force Base near Fort Worth, Texas, since 1948.

== Education ==
Born in Fort Worth, Texas, to Horace Seaver Carswell, Sr. and Bertha (Rea) Carswell, Carswell attended North Side High School, where he played football, with his highlight being the winning touchdown he scored on Armistice Day in a game against Wichita Falls in 1933. After graduation from North Side, Horace attended college at Texas A&M University for a year as a member of the class of 1938, and then began attending Texas Christian University (since four of his uncles were Methodist preachers) where he graduated in August 1939 with a bachelor's degree in physical education. Among his teammates on the Horned Frog football team were quarterbacks Sammy Baugh and Davey O'Brien.

On a double date while still at TCU, Horace met a co-ed featured in one of the yearbook's beauty pages, by the name of Virginia Adaline Ede. Virginia was from a ranching family from the west Texas town of San Angelo. They were married in October 1941.

== Military service ==
After the German invasion of Poland, Carswell decided to join the U.S. Army Air Forces. He was appointed a flying cadet in Dallas on March 26, 1940, and trained at Tulsa, Oklahoma, and Randolph and Kelly Fields, Texas, getting his commission and wings toward the end of 1940. He instructed at Randolph and Goodfellow Fields in Texas, with promotion in February 1942, to first lieutenant.

=== World War II ===
Carswell attended the Army Air Force Combat Crew School at Hendricks Field, Florida. He was an instructor and flight commander with bomb squadrons at Davis Monthan Field, Arizona; Biggs Field, Texas. In December 1942 he was promoted to Captain.

In January 1943, he was assigned to the 356th Bomb Squadron at Clovis Army Air Field, New Mexico, where he was promoted to Major (United States) in April. The next month he was transferred to Headquarters 302nd Bombardment Group. During this period Virginia gave birth to their only child, Robert Ede Carswell, at Clovis Army Air Field in September 1943.

Shortly thereafter he was transferred to Langley Field, Virginia, in operations and group command assignments. Major Carswell went to the Pacific Theater of Operations in April 1944, as pilot and operations officer of the 374th Bombardment Squadron in the 308th Bombardment Group of the 14th Air Force.

Carswell was assigned as the commander of a detachment of B-24Js (radar-equipped bombers used for low-altitude missions) at Liuchow. On October 15 Carswell's B-24 crew experienced success in a night sweep over the South China Sea when it sank two enemy warships.

=== Medal of Honor mission ===
Carswell was flying a B-24 Liberator on the night of October 26, 1944, on a single-aircraft mission against a Japanese convoy in the South China Sea. He elected to make a second low-level run over a thoroughly alerted convoy and scored two direct hits on a large tanker. His co-pilot was wounded, and his aircraft had two engines knocked out, a third damaged, the hydraulic system damaged, and a fuel tank punctured. He managed to gain enough altitude to reach land, where he ordered the crew to bail out. Eight did, but the bombardier's parachute was too badly damaged to use. Instead of bailing out, Carswell stayed with the bombardier and the wounded co-pilot, and attempted a crash landing. The badly damaged aircraft crashed against a mountain, and all three aboard were killed.

Carswell was buried at a Catholic mission in Tungchen, China. He was survived by his wife and son. Carswell Memorial Park – where his remains now rest – in Oakwood Cemetery, is named in his honor.

== Military awards ==
Photo of Carswell and a Medal of Honor on exhibit at Texas A&M University

Carswell was posthumously awarded the Distinguished Flying Cross, the Distinguished Service Cross, the Air Medal, and the Purple Heart. These medals were presented to his wife, Virginia, on December 20, 1944, and July 21, 1945. Major Carswell also received the Medal of Honor posthumously on February 4, 1946.

Army Air Forces Pilot Badge
Medal of Honor	Distinguished Service Cross	Distinguished Flying Cross
Purple Heart	Air Medal	American Defense Service Medal
American Campaign Medal	Asiatic-Pacific Campaign Medal with bronze campaign star	World War II Victory Medal

Army Presidential Unit Citation

=== Medal of Honor citation ===
Rank and organization: Major, 308th Bombardment Group, U.S. Army Air Corps
Place and date: Over South China Sea, October 26, 1944
Entered service at: San Angelo, Texas
Birth: Fort Worth, Texas
G.O. No.: 14, February 4, 1946

Citation:

He piloted a B-24 bomber in a one-plane strike against a Japanese convoy in the South China Sea on the night of 26 October 1944. Taking the enemy force of 12 ships escorted by at least 2 destroyers by surprise, he made 1 bombing run at 600 feet, scoring a near miss on 1 warship and escaping without drawing fire. He circled. and fully realizing that the convoy was thoroughly alerted and would meet his next attack with a barrage of antiaircraft fire, began a second low-level run which culminated in 2 direct hits on a large tanker. A hail of steel from Japanese guns, riddled the bomber, knocking out 2 engines, damaging a third, crippling the hydraulic system, puncturing 1 gasoline tank, ripping uncounted holes in the aircraft, and wounding the copilot; but by magnificent display of flying skill, Major Carswell controlled the plane's plunge toward the sea and carefully forced it into a halting climb in the direction of the China shore. On reaching land, where it would have been possible to abandon the staggering bomber, one of the crew discovered that his parachute had been ripped by flak and rendered useless; the pilot, hoping to cross mountainous terrain and reach a base, continued onward until the third engine failed. He ordered the crew to bail out while he struggled to maintain altitude and, refusing to save himself, chose to remain with his comrade and attempt a crash landing. He died when the airplane struck a mountainside and burned. With consummate gallantry and intrepidity, Major Carswell gave his life in a supreme effort to save all members of his crew. His sacrifice, far beyond that required of him, was in keeping with the traditional bravery of America's war heroes.

=== Distinguished Service Cross citation ===
Date of Action: October 16, 1944

Citation:

The President of the United States of America, authorized by Act of Congress July 9, 1918, takes pride in presenting the Distinguished Service Cross (Posthumously) to Major (Air Corps) Horace Seaver Carswell, Jr., United States Army Air Forces, for extraordinary heroism in connection with military operations against an armed enemy while serving as Pilot of a B-24 Heavy Bomber in the 374th Bombardment Squadron, 308th Bombardment Group (H), Fourteenth Air Force, while participating in a bombing mission on 16 October 1944, against enemy Japanese surface vessels in the South China Sea. During a sea-sweep mission along the China Coast, a task force of six Japanese naval vessels was located by means of radio equipment. A destroyer and a cruiser were singled out for attack. During four runs over the target at an altitude of 400 feet and under intense fire from the supporting vessels, both were sunk. The plane was not struck and returned to the mainland with less than one hour's supply of gas. The exceptional courage, gallantry, cool judgment and skill demonstrated by Major Carswell in attacking such a large naval task force with his lone plane in the face of almost certain destruction, reflect great credit upon himself, the Army Air Forces and the Army of the United States.

== Honors ==
On February 27, 1948, Fort Worth Army Airfield was renamed Carswell Air Force Base in his honor. There are also Carswell Avenues at Elmendorf Air Force Base, Alaska, Lackland Air Force Base, Texas and Whiteman Air Force Base, Missouri named in his honor. A frame containing an artist's rendition and an exhibit Medal of Honor and a citation is on display at Texas A&M University in the Memorial Student Center. A large bronze relief plaque hangs in the Sanders Corps of Cadets Center on the campus of Texas A&M University. Carswell only briefly attended A&M and graduated from TCU.

== See also ==
- List of Medal of Honor recipients
- List of Medal of Honor recipients for World War II
