= Elephant Walk (Texas A&M) =

Tradition at Texas A&M University

Elephant Walk is a tradition at Texas A&M University in which the senior class walks around campus to remember the good times they had at Texas A&M. This tradition generally takes place the week before the last regular-season football game, which before A&M's 2012 move to the Southeastern Conference was the Texas (University of Texas at Austin) game. It signifies the last time that the seniors will stand as a part of the 12th Man student corpus.

== History ==
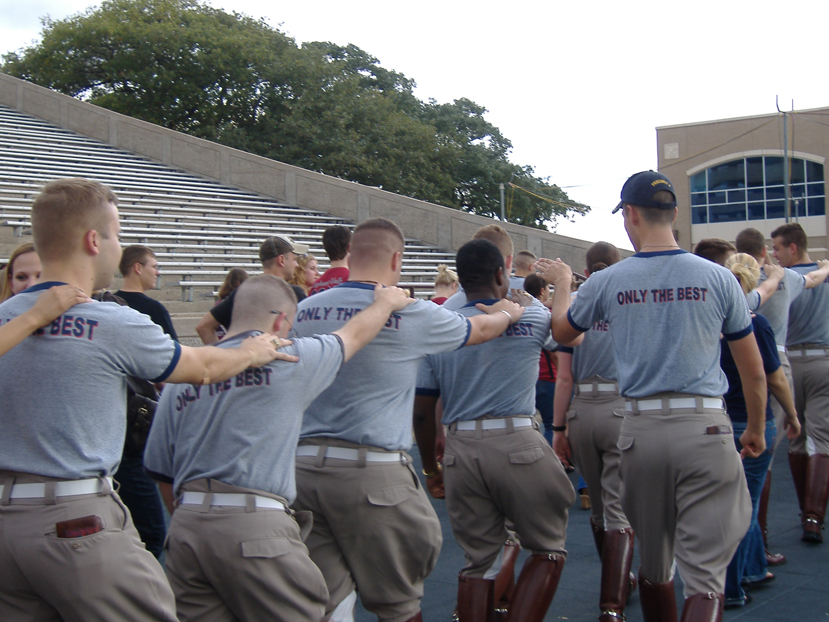
Elephant Walk 2007

In 1922, two freshman members of the Fightin' Texas Aggie Band, Oluf G. "Piccolo Red" Carson (Fort Worth, Texas) and J. William "Sarge" Dorsey (Harlingen, Texas), began playing a funeral march after losing a football game. The two bandsmen, a piccolo player and a bass horn player respectively, began walking away slowly, like an elephant wandering away to die. Other members of the band fell in behind. They continued the march after each football game for the remainder of the season, regardless of the outcome. Following that first walk, the Aggies began a winning streak, including a victory over their archrival, the University of Texas at Austin. At the conclusion of the football season, their marches were discontinued.

In 1926, the senior class performed the march again to remember their four years at the Agricultural and Mechanical College of Texas. Led by the same two "fish", the seniors placed their hands on the shoulder of the cadet in front of them, untucked their shirts and put their hats on backwards indicating that they were out of uniform. They wandered around campus remembering the good and the bad times that they had while students at A&M, and those who had fallen over the years. An underclassman, who had never seen the march before, remarked that they looked like a bunch of old elephants looking for a place to die, hence the name of the tradition.

Before the 1999 collapse of the Aggie Bonfire, the parade of students was led by the eight senior redpots who supervised the bonfire construction.

== Modern observance ==
Though started by the Corps of Cadets, today all seniors at Texas A&M are welcome to participate. The march of seniors often stretches for a mile (1.6 km) consisting of several thousand seniors. Before the walk, T-shirts and pictures with live elephants will be taken at the Clayton Williams Alumni Center. For the class of 2007, Elephant Walk began at Kyle Field for Yell practice and presentation of the class gift. From here seniors wander to many historic locations on campus including the 12th Man statue, the Quad, the Jack K. Williams Administration Building, the H_{2}O fountain and the Lawrence Sullivan Ross Statue. Along the route, the group stops periodically to participate in yells. While marching, they will often sing Aggie songs, such as The Spirit of Aggieland. The walk ends with seniors immersing themselves in Fish Pond. Underclassmen, non seniors, by tradition are not allowed to use the word elephant as it is considered a senior word.

== Junior E-Walk ==
In the 1980s, juniors often attempted to disrupt the seniors' march, armed with water balloons, shaving cream, and baby powder. The 6th and 13th squadrons from the Corps of Cadets often acted as a scout for the rest of the group, disarming any juniors they saw before the main group arrived at that location. The hijinks resulted in injuries at times, with four people suffering fractured bones in the 1986 event.

In 1992, campus administration officials became upset over the destruction of campus property and increasing injury rates and mandated that Elephant Walk return to its solemn nature. With the encouragement of many former students, including the Class of 1926, which sent a letter asking students to respect the tradition, the school initiated a formal "Keep it Clean" campaign. This became known as Junior E-Walk.

Junior E-Walk begins minutes after Elephant Walk begins. To keep the two classes separate, the juniors march in the opposite direction of the seniors. E-Walk now symbolizes the junior class assuming their role as the leaders of the Twelfth Man.

== See also ==
- Elephant walk (aeronautics)
