= Sanders Corps of Cadets Center =

Military museum at Texas A&M University

Coordinates: 30.61209°N 96.33751°W

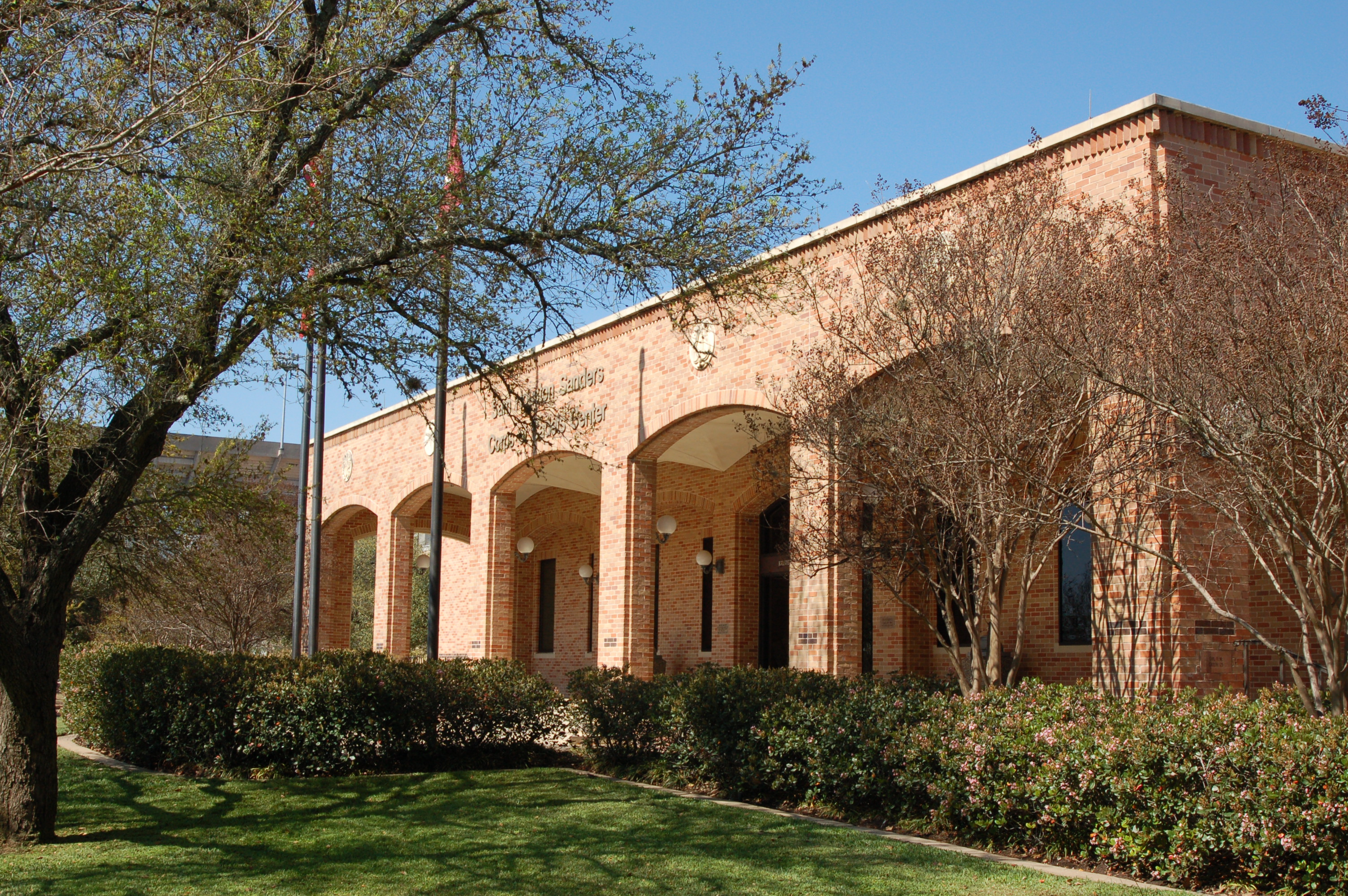
Sanders Corps of Cadets Center

The Sam Houston Sanders Corps of Cadets Center is a museum on the campus of Texas A&M University in College Station, Texas, dedicated to the school's Corps of Cadets.

Since its opening in 1992, the Center has become home to thousands of Aggie artifacts, the Metzger-Sanders gun collection, over 60 exhibits, and over 600 photographs.

== Exhibits ==
Among the exhibits are those honoring Texas A&M traditions such as the 12th Man, Silver Taps and Muster, as well as some of the Corps of Cadets' most cherished traditions: Aggie Band, Final Review, Fish Drill Team, Parson's Mounted Cavalry and Ross Volunteers.

The Center holds six of the seven Medals of Honor awarded to Texas A&M former students for actions during World War II.

=== Hall of Honor ===
The Corps Center hosts the Corps of Cadets Hall of Honor, which was established in 1993 to recognize former Corps members who "exemplify the Aggie Spirit". As of 2018, it features 171 inductees whose portraits, biographies, and plaques are on display. Notable members include Colonel Robert "Danny" Barr, an Air Force One pilot for Presidents George H. W. Bush and Bill Clinton.

== Corps Center Guard ==
The Corps Center Guard (CGG) is based at the center and is a historical unit that serves to preserve the history of the Corps. They give tours to visiting tourists on a daily basis. As a tribute to the past of A&M, members often wear old uniforms of the Corps.
