= Thomas G. Darling =

United States Air Force general (1932–2026)

- Born: April 30, 1932; Abilene, Texas, U.S.
- Died: May 9, 2026 (aged 94)
- Military career
- Allegiance: United States
- Branch: United States Air Force
- Service years: 1954–1986
- Rank: Major general

Thomas Glenn Darling (April 30, 1932 – May 9, 2026) was a major general in the United States Air Force who served as deputy commander in chief and chief of staff United States Atlantic Command from 1986 to 1987.

Darling graduated from Texas A&M University in 1954 and served as Commandant of the Texas A&M University Corps of Cadets following retirement from 1987 to 1996.

Darling died on May 9, 2026, at the age of 94.
