= We've Never Been Licked =

1943 film by John Rawlins

- Theatrical poster
- Directed by: John Rawlins
- Screenplay by: Norman Reilly Raine; Nick Grinde
- Story by: Norman Reilly Raine
- Produced by: Walter Wanger
- Starring: Richard Quine; Anne Gwynne; Martha O'Driscoll; Noah Beery, Jr. William Frawley
- Cinematography: Milton R. Krasner
- Edited by: Philip Cahn
- Music by: Frank Skinner
- Production company: Walter Wanger Productions
- Distributed by: Universal Pictures
- Release date: August 30, 1943 (United States)
- Running time: 103 minutes
- Country: United States
- Language: English
- Budget: $918,175
- Box office: $1,109,186

We've Never Been Licked (or Texas Aggies, Texas to Tokyo, and Fighting Command) is a 1943 World War II propaganda film produced by Walter Wanger and released by Universal Pictures. Released in the UK under the title, Texas to Tokyo, it was re-released in the US as Fighting Command. The cast features Richard Quine, Anne Gwynne, Martha O'Driscoll, Noah Beery, Jr., and William Frawley. (Note: The opening credits include the following written statement: "With appreciation to the staff and student body of the Agricultural and Mechanical College of Texas whose cooperation made this picture possible." The opening credits also state that the final battle sequence was "made with the cooperation of the Navy Department." The film then opens with this written dedication: "This motion picture is dedicated to the thousands of Texas A. & M. college students who participated in the making of this picture and who are now serving their country on many battlefronts all over the world.")

== Plot ==
In 1938, Brad Craig (Richard Quine), the son of a famous Army colonel, starts his freshman (fish) year at the Agricultural & Mechanical College of Texas (now Texas A&M University). After spending the past four years in the Philippines, he has acquired both an intimate knowledge of Japanese culture and a desire to invest in the modernization of Asia. At the train station, Brad is met by cadet “Cyanide” Jenkins (Noah Beery, Jr.), his new roommate. He is also introduced to sophomore (pisshead) cadet “Panhandle” Mitchell (Robert Mitchum), who wastes little time in penalizing Brad for various violations of cadet conduct. As Brad adjusts to life on campus, he becomes romantically involved with Nina Lambert (Anne Gwynne), the daughter of beloved chemistry professor “Pop” Lambert (Harry Devenport).

Following an artillery exercise, Brad observes that the brakes on his section's caisson appear to be damaged. Panhandle disregards Brad's concerns and orders the section to move out. When the brakes fail and the caisson goes careening out of control, Brad risks his life to improvise a solution and prevent a disaster. His actions save Cyanide's life and earn him Panhandle's respect. Brad is soon promoted to “fish sergeant” and his upperclassmen delight in exhausting him (smoking him out) by constantly staging fights and ordering Brad to intervene; he finally discovers the game and wreaks revenge.

As Brad's college career progresses, he discusses marriage with Nina, who is secretly smitten with Cyanide (and he with her), though each is hesitant to disclose their feelings. During the Field Artillery Ball, Brad encourages Cyanide and Nina to dance together when they finally admit their mutual attraction. By the following year, they have become a couple with Brad's blessing. Meanwhile, Brad finds himself in a difficult position when his classmates are concerned about his support of Japan. Two Japanese-American cadets, Kubo (Allen Jung) and Matsui (Roland Got), come to his aid, their justification of Japanese war crimes angers the others and earns Brad the contempt of his friends.

While guarding the Chemistry Building one night, Brad discusses with Pop Lambert his invention that will protect servicemen from poison gas. Pop hides the formula in his office to prevent tampering, but after he departs, Brad is drugged and locked in a closet, but manages to escape, seeing Kubo and Matsui ransacking the professor's office. He trails the pair and confronts their employer, a traveling salesman (William Frawley) working for the Japanese. Having taken some papers from Pop Lambert's office, Brad offers to provide the formula in exchange for a bribe, but deliberately gives them a version of the formula missing a key element whose absence will render it useless.

Brad is accused of treason for his actions, although the commandant does not have enough evidence to bring formal charges. Ostracized by the student body, Brad decides to leave the university. Months later, Brad is working for the Imperial Japanese Navy recording English-language propaganda for distribution in the United States. He is assigned to give radio commentary on an impending Japanese assault on the Solomon Islands. The maneuver is detected and a U.S. Navy carrier group moves to intercept the Japanese fleet.

While airborne to cover the battle, Brad manages to contact the U.S. fighter group, led by Cyanide, revealing his covert infiltration of the Japanese military and offering his services to the American forces. He crashes his own aircraft into the Japanese aircraft carrier, disabling the flight deck and giving the Americans the advantage. Brad dies as the carrier is destroyed and is posthumously awarded the Medal of Honor.

== Cast ==
- Richard Quine as Brad Craig
- Anne Gwynne as Nina Lambert
- Martha O'Driscoll as Deedee Dunhan
- Noah Beery, Jr. as "Cyanide" Jenkins
- William Frawley as Traveling Salesman
- William Blees as Student
- Harry Devenport as "Pop" Lambert
- Edgar Barrier as Nishikawa
- Samuel S. Hinds as Colonel Jason Craig
- Moroni Olsen as Commandant
- Roland Got as Matsui
- Allen Jung as Kubo
- Robert Mitchum as "Panhandle" Mitchell (credited as Bob Mitchum)
- Alfredo DeSa as Fortuno Tavares
- Bill Stern as Announcement
- George Putnam as Army Hour Announcement
- Fess Parker In his 1st screen appearance, uncredited, but could be glimpsed in crowd scenes

== Production ==
Under the working title of Texas Aggies, principal photography for the production took place from mid-November 1942 to early February 1943, Additional scenes were shot from March 30–31, 1943.

We've Never Been Licked featured Lt. Commander John Thach as a technical advisor. The aircraft used in the film included Grumman F4F Wildcat fighters dressed up as Japanese aircraft, Douglas SBD Dauntless dive bombers, Douglas TBD Devastator, and Grumman TBF Avenger torpedo bombers. A group of training aircraft was also in the film: Beech AT-11 Kansan, Curtiss SNC, North American AT-6 Texan, and Waco UPF-7 trainers.

== Reception ==
Bosley Crowther in his review for The New York Times, noted We've Never Been Licked, is: "'We've Never Been Licked', his (Wagner's) latest, which opened at Loew's Criterion yesterday, is a wildly romantic fiction based on the old rah-rah college formula."

Aviation film historian Michael Paris in From the Wright Brothers to Top Gun: Aviation, Nationalism, and Popular Cinema (1995) dismissed We've Never Been Licked, as "nonsensical". Aviation film historian James H. Farmer in Celluloid Wings: The Impact of Movies on Aviation (1984) agreed, stating that We've Never Been Licked, was: "terribly contrived."We've Never Been Licked earned a modest $283,724.
