= Texas–Texas A&M football rivalry =

American college football rivalry

Lone Star Showdown
- Texas Longhorns Texas A&M Aggies
- Sport: Football
- First meeting: October 19, 1894; Texas 38, Texas A&M 0
- Latest meeting: November 28, 2025; Texas 27, Texas A&M 17
- Next meeting: November 27, 2026 in College Station, Texas

Statistics
- Total meetings: 120
- All-time series: Texas leads, 78–37–5
- Largest victory: Texas: 48–0 (1898); Texas A&M: 42–10 (1985)
- Longest win streak: Texas: 10 (1957–1966)
- Current win streak: Texas: 3 (2011, 2024–present)

Locations of Texas and Texas A&M

The Texas–Texas A&M football rivalry is an American intercollegiate football rivalry between the Texas Longhorns football team of the University of Texas at Austin and the Texas A&M Aggies football team of Texas A&M University. Both schools are the flagship institution of their respective university systems, the two largest in the state of Texas. The teams played the first intercollegiate football game in the state in 1894 and played annually from 1915 to 2011, when A&M left the Big 12 Conference to join the Southeastern Conference. The rivalry resumed in 2024 when Texas joined the SEC, and is once again played annually under the trademarked "Lone Star Showdown" moniker at the end of the regular season. Since the SEC went division-less starting in 2024, this game plays a role in determining the participants in the SEC Championship Game three times. With the elimination of the SEC Championship Game beginning in 2027, the series will return to its historic role as a direct, regular-season decider for conference standing and postseason positioning.

The Longhorns have enjoyed sustained success against the Aggies throughout their history and currently lead the series 78–37–5. A&M's most successful stretch occurred from 1984 to 1994, with a 10–1 run. Historically the game was played on Thanksgiving day (90 times between 1900–2011) but has recently shifted to Black Friday. The rivalry has been described as "family vs. family" because players and fans of both teams belong to the same home state and often share personal, high school, or familial ties. As of 2026 it is tied for 10th most-played FBS series.

== History ==
The first meeting was in 1894. By 1911, Texas led the series 15–4–2. The series went back and forth until 1939, with games overwhelmingly won by the home team, but Texas still led 27–15–4. UT Dominated the rivalry over the next 4 decades with a 36–7–1 record. A&M enjoyed their greatest success in the series thereafter from 1984 to 1994 with a 10–1 run. From there on Texas won 12 of the last 17 between the two programs.

In July 2011, A&M elected to join the Southeastern Conference beginning in 2012. The move to switch conferences resulted in the ending of the annual rivalry. On November 24, 2011, UT faced A&M in College Station in the final scheduled annual meeting. Texas won 27–25 on a field goal by Justin Tucker as time expired. In January 2013, a Texas state legislator filed a bill that would require them to play each other every year. The bill was referred to the House Committee on Higher Education on February 18, 2013.

=== Attempts to revive the series ===
In June 2017, A&M's former athletic director, Bill Byrne, was quoted in an article saying, "Their AD (DeLoss Dodds) at the time came out and said we will never play Texas A&M again, and they worked along with Baylor and the conference to have no one in the (Big 12) schedule us...there were other forces at work to make sure we didn't play." Byrne's comments refer to his last year as athletic director in 2012, during which A&M was in the midst of transitioning to the Southeastern Conference.

In September 2017, UT students were polled in a university-wide referendum in which 96.71 percent said "Yes" when asked if they were in favor of bringing the game back or not. Later, in February 2019, during Texas A&M's spring student body elections, 88.71 percent (13,359) of 15,060 voters said "Yes" when asked if they were in favor of reintroducing the rivalry as a non-conference matchup. Both polls were organized by student representatives from both schools in a movement entitled, "Reinstate the Rivalry".

In December 2017, Chris Del Conte was named athletic director of the University of Texas. Shortly thereafter, Del Conte contacted Texas A&M athletic director Scott Woodward with a proposition to schedule a home-and-home series in 2022–23, but Woodward declined, as Texas A&M's non-conference schedule was already filled for those seasons. Again in 2019 during a panel at the 2019 Texas Tribune Festival, Del Conte stated his support for a resumption of the series.

In November 2018, GOP San Antonio Rep. Lyle Larson proposed and filed a bill that would require Texas and Texas A&M to play every year on or around Thanksgiving day. In February 2019, the bill gained the support of Texas Governor Greg Abbott who also voiced support for the resumption of the rivalry. The bill never gained wide support and died in committee, but later in June 2019, Gov. Abbott stated that he had been working with leadership of both universities to schedule a two-game matchup at some future point.

In July 2019, coaches of both schools' football teams reaffirmed their desire to resume the rivalry game.

=== Resumption of the rivalry ===
In 2024, Texas left the Big 12 Conference to join the Southeastern Conference, which meant the rivalry would resume as a conference game. Texas traveled to Texas A&M during the 2024 season to play the first game between the two teams in 13 years, winning the game 17–7.

The following year the 16th ranked Longhorns beat the 3rd ranked Aggies 27–17 in the first game in Austin since 2010. The loss spoiled a perfect season for A&M and knocked them out of what would have been their first SEC title game appearance.

=== Fight songs ===
Each school mentions the other in its fight song or similar:

- Texas Fight includes "and it's goodbye to A&M". The song's author, Col. Walter S. Hunnicutt, originally wrote "Texas Fight" as a retort to A&M taunts, songs and yells that he claimed ridiculed "The Eyes of Texas".
- World War I Marine and A&M student J.V. "Pinky" Wilson originally wrote the Aggie War Hymn as "Goodbye to Texas University". This is mentioned twice in the second verse, and the second verse also says, "So long to the orange and white" and "'The Eyes of Texas are upon you' / That is the song they sing so well", sometimes followed by "Sounds like hell!". After the second verse – the original song – is sung twice, Aggie fans link their arms and legs and sway left and right to replicate the motion of a saw blade and "saw Varsity's horns off" in reference to the Texas football team simply being known as Varsity before adopting the Longhorn as their mascot.

=== 1999 Bonfire game ===
The 1999 game at Kyle Field between the 5th-ranked Longhorns and the 17th-ranked Aggies took place just eight days after the annual Aggie Bonfire collapsed during its construction, killing 12 people – 11 current students and one former student – and injuring 27. Texas A&M players helped clear some of the fallen logs. In addition, the Texas Exes student chapter canceled the Hex Rally in favor of a "Unity Gathering" at the UT Tower and extended an invitation to all Aggies and their friends. The tower was darkened out of respect for those who had died in the collapse or been affected by it, and participants lit white candles instead of the usual red in memory of the fallen Aggies.

The game began with a flyover of F-16 jets, all piloted by former A&M students, in the missing man formation. US Senator Phil Gramm, who taught economics at A&M from 1967 to 1978, donated the flyover he was entitled to upon his death as an elected official, asking instead that it be given in the honor of the 12 Aggies who died. 12 doves were also released before the game, one for each Aggie who had perished. Former US President George H. W. Bush attended, as did his son, Texas Governor and future US President George W. Bush.

At half-time, the Texas Longhorn Band dedicated their performance to the students lost and injured in the collapse, and ended by playing "Amazing Grace" and "Taps", then removing their white hats in a show of respect as they walked off the field. The Fightin' Texas Aggie Band also played a tribute to the victims and, contrary to the usual tradition, marched off the field in a silent cadence. Aggie students, who normally sit only when the opposing band plays, stood throughout both performances and gave both standing ovations. Texas A&M upset Texas 20–16 after scoring a go-ahead touchdown with 5:03 remaining and then forcing and recovering a fumble with 23 seconds to play.

== Game results ==
Texas victories	Texas A&M victories	Tie games

No.	Date	Location	Winning team		Losing team	
1	October 19, 1894	Austin	Texas	38	Texas A&M	0
2	October 22, 1898	Austin	Texas	48	Texas A&M	0
3	November 4, 1899	San Antonio	Texas	6	Texas A&M	0
4	October 27, 1900	San Antonio	Texas	5	Texas A&M	0
5	November 29, 1900^{[t]}	Austin	Texas	11	Texas A&M	0
6	October 26, 1901	San Antonio	Texas	17	Texas A&M	0
7	November 28, 1901^{[t]}	Austin	Texas	32	Texas A&M	0
8	October 25, 1902	San Antonio	Tie	0	Tie	0
9	November 27, 1902^{[t]}	Austin	Texas A&M	11	Texas	0
10	November 29, 1903	Austin	Texas	29	Texas A&M	6
11	November 24, 1904^{[t]}	Austin	Texas	34	Texas A&M	6
12	November 30, 1905^{[t]}	Austin	Texas	27	Texas A&M	0
13	November 29, 1906^{[t]}	Austin	Texas	24	Texas A&M	0
14	October 12, 1907	Dallas	Tie	0	Tie	0
15	November 28, 1907^{[t]}	Austin	Texas	11	Texas A&M	6
16	November 9, 1908	Houston	Texas	24	Texas A&M	8
17	November 29, 1908	Austin	Texas	28	Texas A&M	12
18	November 8, 1909	Houston	Texas A&M	23	Texas	0
19	November 25, 1909^{[t]}	Austin	Texas A&M	5	Texas	0
20	November 14, 1910	Houston	Texas A&M	14	Texas	8
21	November 13, 1911	Houston	Texas	6	Texas A&M	0
22	November 19, 1915	College Station	Texas A&M	13	Texas	0
23	November 30, 1916^{[t]}	Austin	Texas	21	Texas A&M	7
24	November 20, 1917	College Station	Texas A&M	7	Texas	0
25	November 28, 1918^{[t]}	Austin	Texas	7	Texas A&M	0
26	November 27, 1919^{[t]}	College Station	Texas A&M	7	Texas	0
27	November 25, 1920^{[t]}	Austin	Texas	7	Texas A&M	3
28	November 24, 1921^{[t]}	College Station	Tie	0	Tie	0
29	November 30, 1922^{[t]}	Austin	Texas A&M	14	Texas	7
30	November 29, 1923^{[t]}	College Station	Texas	6	Texas A&M	0
31	November 27, 1924^{[t]}	Austin	Texas	7	Texas A&M	0
32	November 26, 1925^{[t]}	College Station	Texas A&M	28	Texas	0
33	November 25, 1926^{[t]}	Austin	Texas	14	Texas A&M	5
34	November 24, 1927^{[t]}	College Station	Texas A&M	28	Texas	7
35	November 29, 1928^{[t]}	Austin	Texas	19	Texas A&M	0
36	November 28, 1929^{[t]}	College Station	Texas A&M	13	Texas	0
37	November 27, 1930^{[t]}	Austin	Texas	26	Texas A&M	0
38	November 26, 1931^{[t]}	College Station	Texas A&M	7	Texas	6
39	November 24, 1932^{[t]}	Austin	Texas	21	Texas A&M	0
40	November 30, 1933^{[t]}	College Station	Tie	10	Tie	10
41	November 29, 1934^{[t]}	Austin	Texas	13	Texas A&M	0
42	November 28, 1935^{[t]}	College Station	Texas A&M	20	Texas	6
43	November 26, 1936^{[t]}	Austin	Texas	7	Texas A&M	0
44	November 25, 1937^{[t]}	College Station	Texas A&M	7	Texas	0
45	November 24, 1938^{[t]}	Austin	Texas	7	Texas A&M	6
46	November 30, 1939	College Station	#1 Texas A&M	20	Texas	0
47	November 28, 1940	Austin	Texas	7	Texas A&M	0
48	November 27, 1941^{[t]}	College Station	#10 Texas	23	#2 Texas A&M	0
49	November 26, 1942^{[t]}	Austin	#18 Texas	12	Texas A&M	6
50	November 25, 1943^{[t]}	College Station	#12 Texas	27	#16 Texas A&M	13
51	November 30, 1944	Austin	Texas	6	Texas A&M	0
52	November 29, 1945	College Station	#10 Texas	20	Texas A&M	10
53	November 28, 1946^{[t]}	Austin	#20 Texas	24	Texas A&M	7
54	November 27, 1947^{[t]}	College Station	#7 Texas	32	Texas A&M	13
55	November 25, 1948^{[t]}	Austin	Tie	14	Tie	14
56	November 24, 1949^{[t]}	College Station	Texas	42	Texas A&M	14
57	November 30, 1950	Austin	#3 Texas	17	Texas A&M	0
58	November 29, 1951	College Station	Texas A&M	22	#16 Texas	21
59	November 27, 1952^{[t]}	Austin	#10 Texas	32	Texas A&M	12
60	November 26, 1953^{[t]}	College Station	#7 Texas	21	Texas A&M	12
61	November 25, 1954^{[t]}	Austin	Texas	22	Texas A&M	13

No.	Date	Location	Winning team		Losing team	
62	November 24, 1955^{[t]}	College Station	Texas	21	#8 Texas A&M	6
63	November 29, 1956	Austin	#5 Texas A&M	34	Texas	21
64	November 28, 1957^{[t]}	College Station	Texas	9	#4 Texas A&M	7
65	November 27, 1958^{[t]}	Austin	Texas	27	Texas A&M	0
66	November 26, 1959^{[t]}	College Station	#4 Texas	20	Texas A&M	17
67	November 24, 1960^{[t]}	Austin	Texas	21	Texas A&M	14
68	November 23, 1961^{[t]}	College Station	#5 Texas	25	Texas A&M	0
69	November 22, 1962^{[t]}	Austin	#4 Texas	13	Texas A&M	3
70	November 28, 1963^{[t]}	College Station	#1 Texas	15	Texas A&M	13
71	November 26, 1964^{[t]}	Austin	#5 Texas	26	Texas A&M	7
72	November 25, 1965^{[t]}	College Station	Texas	21	Texas A&M	17
73	November 24, 1966^{[t]}	Austin	Texas	22	Texas A&M	14
74	November 23, 1967^{[t]}	College Station	Texas A&M	10	Texas	7
75	November 28, 1968^{[t]}	Austin	#6 Texas	35	Texas A&M	14
76	November 27, 1969^{[t]}	College Station	#1 Texas	49	Texas A&M	12
77	November 26, 1970^{[t]}	Austin	#1 Texas	52	Texas A&M	14
78	November 25, 1971^{[t]}	College Station	#12 Texas	34	Texas A&M	14
79	November 23, 1972^{[t]}	Austin	#7 Texas	38	Texas A&M	3
80	November 22, 1973^{[t]}	College Station	#11 Texas	42	Texas A&M	13
81	November 29, 1974	Austin	#17 Texas	32	#8 Texas A&M	3
82	November 28, 1975	College Station	#2 Texas A&M	20	#5 Texas	10
83	November 25, 1976^{[t]}	Austin	#11 Texas A&M	27	Texas	3
84	November 26, 1977	College Station	#1 Texas	57	#12 Texas A&M	28
85	December 2, 1978	Austin	#14 Texas	22	Texas A&M	7
86	December 1, 1979	College Station	Texas A&M	13	#6 Texas	7
87	November 29, 1980	Austin	Texas A&M	24	Texas	14
88	November 26, 1981^{[t]}	College Station	#7 Texas	21	Texas A&M	13
89	November 25, 1982^{[t]}	Austin	#14 Texas	53	Texas A&M	16
90	November 26, 1983	College Station	#2 Texas	45	Texas A&M	13
91	December 1, 1984	Austin	Texas A&M	37	#13 Texas	12
92	November 28, 1985^{[t]}	College Station	#15 Texas A&M	42	#18 Texas	10
93	November 27, 1986^{[t]}	Austin	#10 Texas A&M	16	Texas	3
94	November 26, 1987^{[t]}	College Station	#15 Texas A&M	20	Texas	13
95	November 24, 1988^{[t]}	Austin	Texas A&M	28	Texas	24
96	December 2, 1989	College Station	#16 Texas A&M	21	Texas	10
97	December 1, 1990	Austin	#5 Texas	28	Texas A&M	27
98	November 28, 1991^{[t]}	College Station	#10 Texas A&M	31	Texas	14
99	November 26, 1992^{[t]}	Austin	#4 Texas A&M	34	Texas	13
100	November 25, 1993^{[t]}	College Station	#8 Texas A&M	18	Texas	9
101	November 5, 1994	Austin	#11 Texas A&M	34	Texas	10
102	December 2, 1995	College Station	#9 Texas	16	#16 Texas A&M	6
103	November 29, 1996	Austin	Texas	51	Texas A&M	15
104	November 28, 1997	College Station	#15 Texas A&M	27	Texas	16
105	November 27, 1998	Austin	Texas	26	#6 Texas A&M	24
106	November 26, 1999	College Station	#24 Texas A&M	20	#7 Texas	16
107	November 24, 2000	Austin	#12 Texas	43	#22 Texas A&M	17
108	November 23, 2001	College Station	#5 Texas	21	Texas A&M	7
109	November 29, 2002	Austin	#10 Texas	50	Texas A&M	20
110	November 28, 2003	College Station	#6 Texas	46	Texas A&M	15
111	November 26, 2004	Austin	#5 Texas	26	#22 Texas A&M	13
112	November 25, 2005	College Station	#2 Texas	40	Texas A&M	29
113	November 24, 2006	Austin	Texas A&M	12	#11 Texas	7
114	November 23, 2007	College Station	Texas A&M	38	#14 Texas	30
115	November 27, 2008^{[t]}	Austin	#4 Texas	49	Texas A&M	9
116	November 26, 2009^{[t]}	College Station	#3 Texas	49	Texas A&M	39
117	November 25, 2010^{[t]}	Austin	#17 Texas A&M	24	Texas	17
118	November 24, 2011^{[t]}	College Station	#25 Texas	27	Texas A&M	25
119	November 30, 2024	College Station	#3 Texas	17	#20 Texas A&M	7
120	November 28, 2025	Austin	#16 Texas	27	#3 Texas A&M	17
Series: Texas leads 78–37–5
^{[t]} Thanksgiving Day game

=== Results by location ===
As of November 28, 2025

City	Games	Texas victories	Texas A&M victories	Ties	Years played
Austin	61	47	13	1	1894–2010, 2025–present
College Station	50	26	22	2	1915–2011, 2024–present
Houston	4	2	2	0	1908–1911
San Antonio	4	3	0	1	1899–1902
Dallas	1	0	0	1	1907

== In popular culture ==
In October 2006, General Mills announced they would honor the then third-longest running college football rivalry with a special edition Wheaties box. The box featured the helmets of Texas and Texas A&M and their respective home stadiums, Darrell K Royal–Texas Memorial Stadium and Kyle Field, on either side. Although several individual college basketball and football teams had been featured previously on special edition boxes, this was the first time Wheaties had honored a rivalry series.

The game's tradition figures into the plot of the 1978 stage musical The Best Little Whorehouse in Texas and its film adaptation; in the show, each year the game's winners (in the story, the Aggies) would celebrate at the "Chicken Ranch", until an overzealous news reporter (a character based on Marvin Zindler) endeavors to close the legendary brothel.

== See also ==
- List of NCAA college football rivalry games
- List of most-played college football series in NCAA Division I
- Lone Star Showdown
