= Goodbye, My Coney Island Baby =

Song by Les Applegate
- Language: English
- Genre: Barbershop
- Lyricist(s): Les Applegate

"Goodbye, My Coney Island Baby" is a popular barbershop song composed in 1924 by Les Applegate. The tune was later adopted by Texas A&M for their Aggie War Hymn, the words of which were written in 1918 by J.V. "Pinky" Wilson, while he was serving in France during World War I.

"Coney Island Baby" is often included in the repertoire of a barbershop quartet. The original lyrics are not related to Coney Island directly, but are about a man abandoning his lover (whom he apparently met at Coney Island) to avoid marriage, the drudgery of which is lamented in the middle section, often known separately as "We All Fall."

An alternative reading can be made by reference to the line "I'm gonna sail upon that ferry boat" which suggests that the song is sung by a man about to take the ferry from Coney Island. Until the subway came to Coney Island in 1920 most visitors would have arrived (and departed) by ferry.

The song is sung by Apu, Chief Wiggum (later replaced by Barney), Homer, and Principal Skinner in The Simpsons episode "Homer's Barbershop Quartet". It also appears in season 6 episode 2 of Frasier (titled "Frasier's Curse") when the title character begrudgingly reconnects with his high school's chess club barbershop quartet (the Checkmates) at the end of a miserable reunion party.
