= Aggie War Hymn =

Song in Texas A&M University, US

The Aggie War Hymn is the war hymn of Texas A&M University; officially, the school does not have a fight song, but this fills the same role.

== Lyrics ==
The lyrics and the melodies of the War Hymn are as follows:

Hullabaloo, Caneck! Caneck!
Hullabaloo, Caneck! Caneck!

First verse
Melody: Goodbye, My Coney Island Baby by Les Applegate
All hail to dear old Texas A&M
Rally around Maroon and White
Good luck to dear old Texas Aggies
They are the boys who show the real old fight
That good old Aggie spirit thrills us
And makes us yell and yell and yell
So let's fight for dear old Texas A&M
We’re gonna beat you all to
Chig-gar-roo-gar-rem
Chig-gar-roo-gar-rem
Rough! Tough! Real stuff! Texas A&M!

Second verse
Melody: Goodbye, My Coney Island Baby by Les Applegate
Good-bye to Texas University
So long to the orange and the white
Good luck to dear old Texas Aggies
They are the boys that show the real old fight
“The Eyes of Texas are upon you . . .”
That is the song they sing so well
So good-bye to Texas University
We’re gonna beat you all to
Chig-gar-roo-gar-rem
Chig-gar-roo-gar-rem
Rough! Tough! Real stuff! Texas A&M!

Chant
Melody from Le devin du village by Jean-Jacques Rousseau
Saw Varsity's horns off!
Saw Varsity's horns off!
Saw Varsity's horns off!
Short! A!

Varsity's horns are sawed off!
Varsity's horns are sawed off!
Varsity's horns are sawed off!
Short! A! (Whoop)

Outro
Melody: A Hot Time in the Old Town by Theodore A. Metz and Joe Hayden
Late one night when the t-sips were in bed
Old Sul Ross took a lantern in the shed
The Aggie kicked it over, he winked and then he said,
"There’ll be a hot time in Austin tonight!"

== History ==
J.V. "Pinky" Wilson, one of many Aggies who fought in World War I, is attributed as the primary author of the song. Wilson combined several Aggie yells into a song called "Good-bye to Texas University." He wrote the lyrics in 1918 on the back of a letter from home while holed up in a trench during a battle in France. He later put the words to music after Armistice was signed and before he returned to the United States. Upon returning to Texas A&M in 1919, the song was frequently performed by a quartet that Wilson organized, called the "Cast-Iron Quartet."

According to Aggie tradition, on one night in 1920, several of the Aggie Yell Leaders heard Wilson's quartet singing the song at a Bryan, TX theater during the intermission of a movie. The Yell Leaders were so impressed by the tune, they waited until after the regular show to meet him. During the meeting, they asked him to let them submit his work (the War Hymn) into a contest for a new fight song held in the fall. Wilson and his quartet quickly agreed to perform the Aggie War Hymn in the contest. They honed their skills for the contest over the summer where they met after working cattle in the evenings. While unofficial ceremonies were held before games during this time, they were still not University sanctioned activities. The contest for the fight song occurred during one of these unofficial midnight yells. It was held outside Sbisa Hall after the evening meal. It became such a success that the song was officially adopted that fall under its current title.

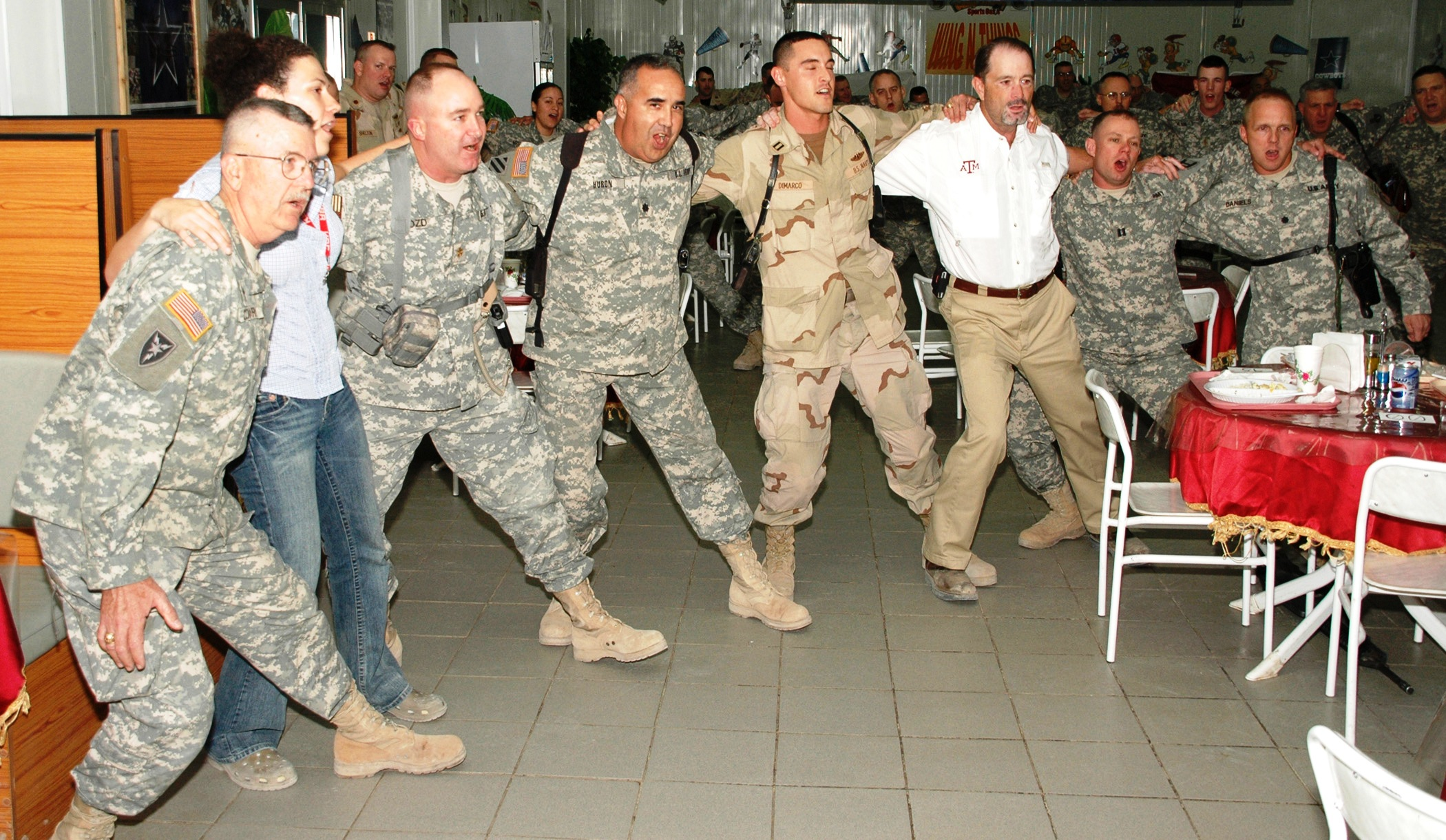
A group of Aggie soldiers in Camp Victory, Iraq doing the "Saw Varsity's Horns Off" portion of the war hymn

The song is noted for beginning with Recall, an old bugle call, in the two different keys of the bugles in use by the US Army during World War I. It starts with the M1892 Field Trumpet in G, which is the "bugle" still in use today, and ends with the M1894 Field Trumpet in B-flat (a.k.a., the "Trench Bugle"). This is a nod to Texas A&M's past as a military school. Indeed, for many years, the Fightin' Texas Aggie Band's halftime show has begun with the drum major shouting "Recall! Step off on 'Hullabaloo!'"

The starting phrase of the song, "Hullabaloo, Caneck! Caneck!" is widely thought to originate from an Old Army Aggie yell written in 1907, Texas A&M University president Jack K. Williams jokingly defined the phrase as Chickasaw Indian for "Beat the hell out of the University of Texas".

The original song is actually the second verse of the hymn; in 1938, Wilson wrote another verse at the request of several Aggie students who thought the original was too focused on the Aggies' rivalry with the University of Texas. The additional lyrics comprise what is now the first verse of the song. However, the first verse has never caught on, in part because many felt it sounded too much like an Ivy League song. Thus, in practice, the second (original) verse is usually sung twice.

The second verse opens with "Goodbye to texas university"; these words were chosen since Aggies refer to their principal athletic rival, Texas, as "texas university", or "t.u.", rather than "U.T.". For many years, Aggie fans have thrown their heads back and shouted "sounds like hell!" after the line "that is the song they sing so well"; however, the phrase is not officially part of the song. During the late 2010s, some fans started shouting "You!" after the line "The eyes of Texas are upon you" as well.

After the second verse is sung twice, Aggie fans link their arms and legs, and sway left and right to replicate the motion of a saw blade; this is called "sawing Varsity's horns off" (before the Texas football team adopting the Longhorn as the official mascot, the team was simply known as "Varsity"). For years, when this happened during football games at Kyle Field, this caused the entire west upper deck, including the press box, to sway. This often unnerved sportswriters who hadn't covered an Aggie game before, even though a sign in the press box warned that "the press box will move during the Aggie War Hymn." Renovations after the 2014 season lessened the swaying effect somewhat.

In 1997, the song was rated as the No. 1 college fight song by USA Today. It was also used by NASA Flight Director Gerry Griffin to wake up astronauts in space from 1983 to 1995.

The song was also used as a wakeup call on Day 11 of space mission STS-121 for Texas A&M former student and mission specialist Mike Fossum.

On November 10, 2018, the 100th anniversary of the hymn's writing, The Wilson Family's members held a ceremony on the 50-yard line in front of the Fightin' Texas Aggie Band during a home game against Ole Miss at Kyle Field.

The hymn was also performed during the state funeral of George H. W. Bush during his casket's arrival in College Station for interment at the Bush Library, as the Fightin' Texas Aggie Band played it following "Hail to the Chief".
