= There'll Be a Hot Time in the Old Town Tonight =

19th century American song

"A Hot Time in the Old Town"
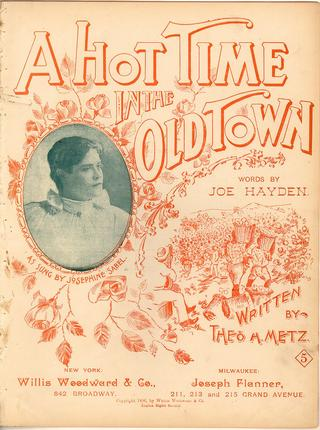
- Sheet music cover (1896)

Song
- Published: 1896
- Genre: Popular song, minstrel
- Songwriters: Composer: Theo A. Metz; Lyricist: Joe Hayden

Audio sample
- Recording of There'll Be a Hot Time in the Old Town Tonight, performed by Prince's Band (1915): file; help

"A Hot Time in the Old Town", also titled as "There'll Be a Hot Time in the Old Town Tonight", is an American popular song, copyrighted and perhaps composed in 1896 by Theodore August Metz with lyrics by Joe Hayden. Metz was the bandleader of the McIntyre and Heath Minstrels.

== Origins ==
One history of the song reports: "While on tour with the McIntyre and Heath Minstrels, their train arrived at a place called 'Old Town'. From their train window, [Metz] could see a group of children starting a fire, near the tracks. One of the other minstrels remarked that 'there'll be a hot time in the old town tonight'. Metz noted the remark on a scrap of paper, intending to write a march with that motif. He did indeed write the march the very next day. It was then used by the McIntyre and Heath Minstrels in their Street parades."

An alternative suggestion is that Metz first heard the tune played in about 1893 at Babe Connor's brothel, known as the Castle, in St Louis, Missouri, where it was one of the songs performed by the entertainer known as Mama Lou (or Mammy Lou), with pianist Tom Turpin.

Another alternative lists the Hub Saloon in the Grand Hotel (later renamed Imperial and today known as the Grand Imperial Hotel) in Silverton, Colorado, as the song's birthplace. One source states the song might be referring to the red-light district in Cripple Creek, Colorado.

And yet one more version is Metz and his Minstrels were in Hot Springs, South Dakota, where Joe Hayden worked at the Evans Hotel. Hayden had the song from his "growing up" days in New Orleans, and Metz and he sat down and wrote the first version of "Hot Time" for a rededication ceremony for the local Chautauqua Park and Entertainment Center. The tale is part of the 2015 book And the Wind Whispered.

According to a 1956 article in the "Afro Magazine Section" of the Baltimore Afro American, Mama Lou's original lyrics went: "Late last night about ten o'clock / I knocked at the door and the door was locked / I peeked through the blinds, thought my baby was dead / There was another man in the folding bed....". Metz heard the tune, copyrighted the music in his own name, and had it incorporated into a minstrel show, Tuxedo Girls, with revised lyrics.

The dialect and narrative of the song imitate those of African-American revival meetings.

The song was referenced by the Salina Herald of Salina, Kansas, on December 31, 1891. The piece describes a fire in a Chicago hotel in which, coincidentally, the last notes played on an organ were, "There'll Be a Hot Time in the Old Town, To-night." The article apparently assumed that the reader would understand the reference and tune, suggesting that the musical phrase had an earlier origin.

The Centralia Enterprise and Tribune of Centralia, Wisconsin, published a piece about a football game on March 8, 1890, placing in quotes the phrase, "there will be a hot time in the old town tomorrow tonight." Again, the placement within quotes suggests that the reader was expected to understand a reference to something else from popular culture. The song, or phrase from a song, was already part of American culture.

== In popular culture ==
=== Films and musicals ===
- The 1930 Mickey Mouse short film The Fire Fighters features a spirited rendition of the song played and sung as the firefighters rush to the fire.
- The song was used as the opening theme for Looney Tunes short films from 1930's Sinkin' in the Bathtub to 1932's Ride Him, Bosko!.
- The song was the basis for a 1930 Screen Songs cartoon.
- Joker directly refers to the song in the film Batman (1989) while electrocuting Antoine Rotelli with his Joy Buzzer.

=== Military ===
The song was a favorite of the American military at the end of the 19th century, during the Spanish–American War and around the start of the 20th century, during the Boxer Rebellion. The tune became popular in the military after it was used as a theme by Teddy Roosevelt's Rough Riders.

=== Sports ===
- The song is now frequently sung by fans of the Chicago Fire Soccer Club of Major League Soccer during matches, with lyrics reflecting the legend of Catherine O'Leary's cow's alleged role in the team's namesake, the Great Chicago Fire of 1871. The Great Fire coincidentally burned much of the Old Town, Chicago, neighborhood, where the Chicago Fire Soccer Club held their first team practice in 1998 at the Moody Bible Institute.
- The song has been tradition at the University of Wisconsin since the late 1890s, when a Wisconsin-flavored arrangement was made. The University of Wisconsin Marching Band plays this arrangement regularly at sporting events, including the beginning of each period in hockey and basketball, and following touchdowns at football games.
- Prior to the adoption of "The Victors" as the University of Michigan's official fight song, it was considered to be Michigan's school song.
- Texas A&M University's "Aggie War Hymn" currently uses the chorus of this song as its finale, but it is sung with different lyrics referencing former school president and Texas governor Lawrence Sullivan Ross and the archrival University of Texas at Austin.
- The University of Kansas's "Waving the Wheat" is also set to the tune.
- Florida A&M University’s Marching 100 play this song at two different speeds following a touchdown and an extra point.

=== Television ===
- Richard Nixon's 1968 U.S. Presidential campaign used part of the song (set to images of celebratory clips from the 1968 Democratic National Convention) mixed with more dissonant sounds accompanying pictures of poverty-stricken areas, soldiers wounded in Vietnam, and the recent unrest, including the riots at that same convention.
- The song was covered by the Muppets in Marty Feldman's episode on The Muppet Show.
- The song is referenced in the opening to the dub of the Dragon Ball episode "Hotter Than Lava".
- A zydeco instrumental of the song plays in a SpongeBob SquarePants episode, "SpongeBob TrashPants".
- The song was preformed by The Muppets on The Muppet Show In Season 5, episode 18. With guest star Marty Feldman in 1981.
- The song features in season one, episode five of the PBS Masterpiece Mystery series, "Grantchester" (2014).
