= J. V. Wilson =

American soldier

James Vernon "Pinky" Wilson (12 February 1897 – 3 July 1980) was an American soldier who is known for being the author of the "Aggie War Hymn", which is the de facto fight song of Texas A&M University.

He was born in Florence, Texas, in 1897. Wilson enrolled at Texas A&M in 1915, when the First World War was just in its first years. By the time he was junior, the United States entered the war and he joined the United States Marine Corps and was sent to the frontlines in France in 1917. It was there where he wrote the now famous war hymn, specifically during a battle when he wrote phrases from a number of school yells on the back of a letter while waiting for orders from his commander. In the months that followed, the war came to an end and Wilson completed the song, singing it with his fellow marines while stationed in Germany. Upon returning to College Station, he completed his studies at A&M and graduated with his class in 1920. The song (which at the time was known as "Good-bye to Texas University") was frequently performed by the Cast-Iron Quartet, which was organized by Wilson and was chosen by a couple of Aggie Yell Leaders as the university's fight song. It was first performed by the Fightin’ Texas Aggie Band in 1921 at the halftime drill during a football game against Baylor University. He died in 1980.
