= Theodore Metz =

- Born: Theodore August Metz; March 14, 1848; Kingdom of Hanover
- Died: January 12, 1936 (aged 87) New York City, New York, U.S.
- Genres: Ragtime
- Occupations: Bandleader, composer

Theodore August Metz (March 14, 1848 – January 12, 1936) was a German-born American bandleader and composer, best known for writing "There'll Be a Hot Time in the Old Town Tonight".

== Biography ==
Metz was born in Hanover, where as a child he studied violin at the city's Conservatory. After emigrating to the United States, he worked in a pharmacy in Brooklyn and then as a gymnastics and swimming instructor in Indianapolis, where he took lessons in orchestration. In 1886, he settled in Chicago, where he worked on building projects in the daytime and as a musician at night, conducting local bands in ragtime interpretations of familiar tunes. He became the conductor of a touring company, the McIntyre and Heath Minstrels, and copyrighted "There'll Be a Hot Time in the Old Town Tonight" in 1897.

According to Metz, he wrote the tune after seeing children starting a fire in a place called "Old Town", although it has also been suggested that he may have first heard the tune played by musicians in Babe Connor's well-known brothel in St. Louis, Missouri. It became his company's signature tune in their street parades, and words were added by one of the company's singers, Joe Hayden. The song became a popular marching tune, especially during the Spanish–American War of 1898, when enemy troops reputedly heard it so often that they believed it to be the national anthem.

Metz wrote a number of other popular tunes, including "When the Roses Are in Bloom" and "Never Do Nothin' for Nobody", as well as an operetta, Poketa, with libretto by Monroe Rosenfeld. He set up a music publishing company in Stamford, Connecticut, later relocating to New York City. He retired there after World War I. In 1935, he received a standing ovation at Madison Square Garden when the band played "There'll Be a Hot Time in the Old Town Tonight". He died in New York in 1936, aged 87.
