= Aggie Yell Leaders =

Students at Texas A&M University

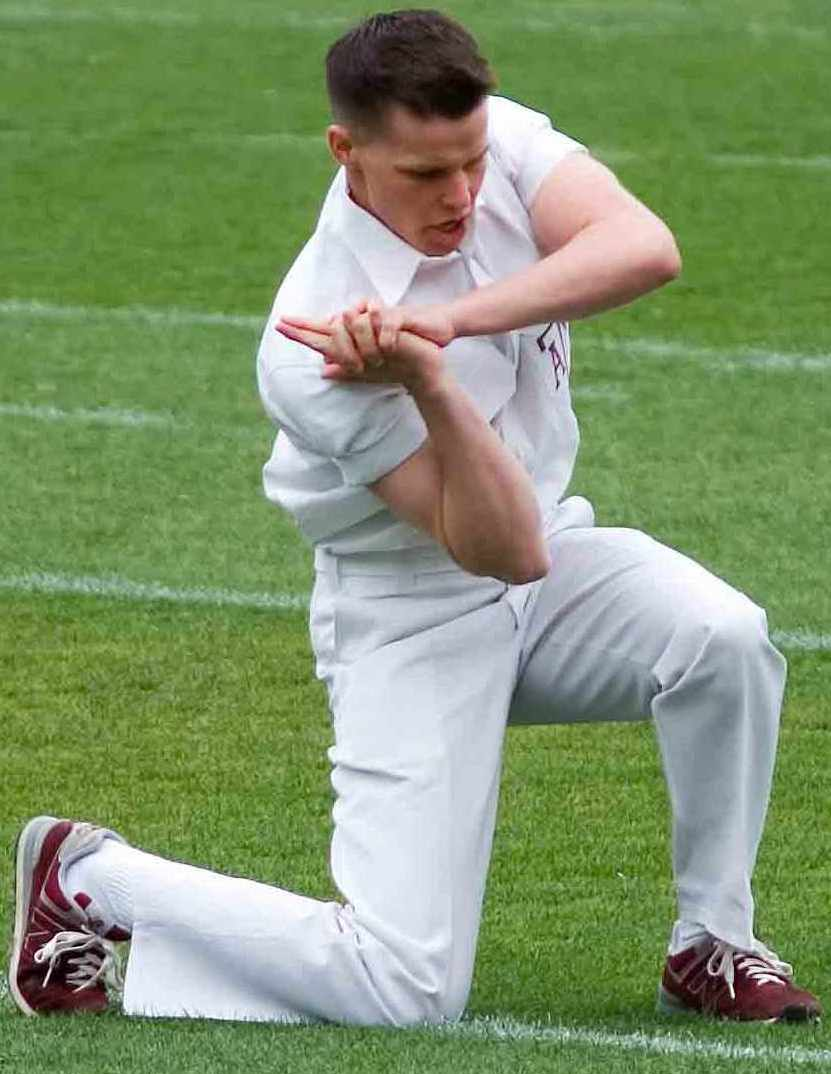
A yell leader leading the "Gig 'Em" yell on the field at a football game.

The Aggie Yell Leaders are a group of Texas A&M University students that lead Aggie fans in a series of "yells" during athletic events or other school events. The Yell Leaders are composed of five students (three seniors and two juniors) who are elected annually by popular vote of the student body.

The Yell Leaders use a variety of hand signals, called "pass-backs," to direct and intensify the crowds. Notable former Aggie Yell Leaders include former Texas Governor and Secretary of Energy Rick Perry, trauma surgeon Dr. Red Duke and Texas State Representative Trent Ashby.

== History ==
The Yell Leader tradition dates to 1907. According to A&M lore, the Aggies were being soundly defeated and a large number of women who had taken the train from Texas Woman's University in Denton were threatening to leave. The upperclassmen ordered the freshmen to find a way to keep the women entertained. Several freshmen snuck into a maintenance closet and changed into white coveralls. They then began leading the crowd in yells and telling jokes from the track in front of the stands. It was an instant hit and was quickly incorporated into the gameday repertoire for the Aggies. However, the freshmen became so popular with the ladies that it was becoming a problem, and "it was decided that only upperclassmen would be allowed to participate in this entertainment in the future." While usually a position held by members of the Corps of Cadets, non-Corps students have been elected to the position. Bill Beck, Class of 1942, was the first non-corps yell leader elected in 1946 and Ricky Wood, Class of 2001, became the first non-corps Head Yell Leader in 2000–2001. Since the tradition began there have been 32 non-Corps yell leaders.

In the early 1990s, the student body elected its first African American yell leader, Ronnie McDonald, Class of 1993. In 1999, McDonald became the youngest African American to become a county judge in the history of Texas.

== Current tradition ==
=== Personnel ===
The Aggie Yell Leaders are composed of three seniors and two juniors, with one senior designated as "Head Yell Leader." They are elected annually, making A&M one of the few schools that still elects spirit leaders. Sometimes, more than twice as many students vote for yell leader candidates than vote in the Student Body President elections. Traditionally, the Yell Leaders are members of the Texas A&M University Corps of Cadets in keeping with A&M's military history, though "non-reg" students have occasionally earned election. The first "non-reg" elected as Yell Leader was Garry Mauro, class of 1970. Although women have campaigned for Yell Leader at the main Texas A&M campus in College Station, none have ever been elected. In 2005, however, Amanda Filkins '07 was elected as Junior Yell Leader at Texas A&M University at Galveston, which is the marine and maritime branch campus of Texas A&M University.

NCAA rules prevent the Yell Leaders from participating in athletic practices, but the Head Yell Leader can usually be found during two-a-days, running and lifting alongside the football team. The Yell Leaders, along with junior and senior cadets of the Fightin' Texas Aggie Band, and Seniors of the Fightin' Texas Aggie Singing Cadets are the only students on campus who receive a varsity letter without playing a sport.

The Yell Leaders attend all home and away football games, all home men's and women's basketball games, post-season basketball games, all home soccer games, all home volleyball games, and selected home and away games for other sporting events. The 2024-2025 yell leaders are Head Yell Leader Jake Carter '25, Senior Yell Leaders Grayson Poage '25 and Josiah Brantley '25 and Junior Yell Leaders Kyler Fife '26 and Luke Widener '26.

=== Football-specific traditions ===
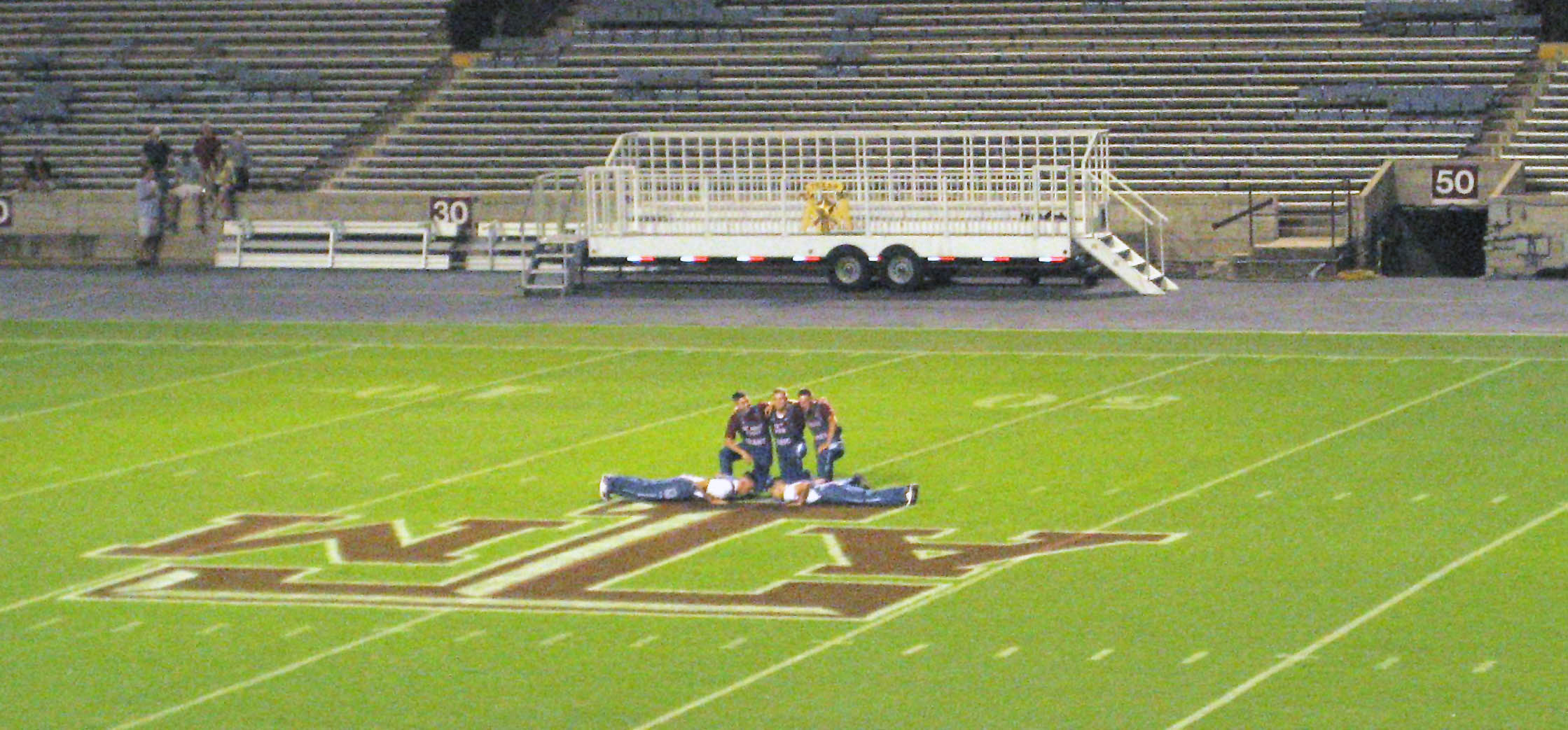
Junior Yell Leaders perform pushups and the Aggie Band plays a tune. Junior Yell Leaders are required to do a "class set", which is 100 push-ups plus their class year. (i.e. 2012 would be 112)

Besides their game-day duties, the Aggie Yell leaders are the Masters of Ceremonies at the Aggie pep-rally-type event known as Midnight Yell Practice. This event is held the night before a football game, at midnight, at Kyle Field for home games and at a designated location in the opposing team's city for away games. During these events, the Aggie Yell Leaders tell stories about ways in which "Ol' Rock" the prototypical Aggie defeats the upcoming opponents' mascots and lead the crowds in yells, so that all attendees know what to do in the coming game. They lead an additional, smaller, Yell Practice on the Thursday night before all away games (even bowl games), called Arch Yell, which is held in front of the 12 arches at the entryway to the Corps of Cadets quad area.

At the various yell practices, the Aggie Yell Leaders wear either maroon (seniors) or white (juniors) T-shirts and denim overalls that are embroidered by a seamstress, often featuring their graduation year and various depictions of the A&M traditions. During sporting events, they always wear a white button-down shirt and white pants.

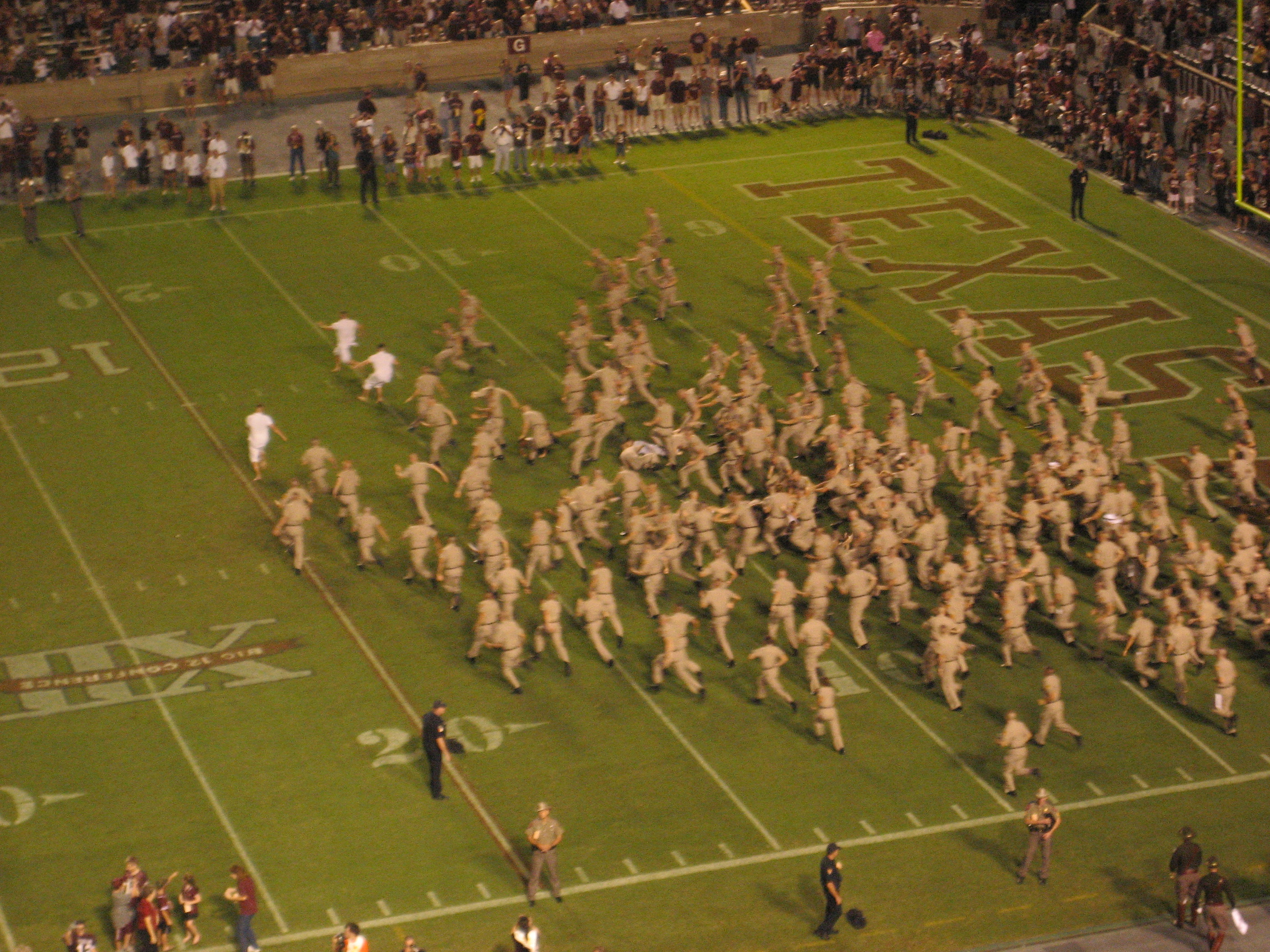
Freshmen (in khaki) from the Corps of Cadets chase down and tackle the Yell Leaders (in white) after a victory

During a game, the Yell Leaders signal the crowd to start a yell by flashing pass backs. Once the signal is passed throughout the crowd, the Yell Leaders give the signal for the crowd to "hump it," or lean forward with hands just above their knees, and the yell begins. The theory behind "humpin' it" is that it aligns the back, neck and throat in the proper position to maximize the noise. They also use pass backs to signal when to sing the various school songs, in much the same way as cheerleaders lead songs at other schools.

When the Aggie football team is defeated at home, the crowd remains in the stands at the end of the game while the Aggie Yell Leaders conduct a short yell practice, including the singing of the song 12th Man, in preparation for the next week's game. If the Aggies win a home football game, the freshmen in the Corps of Cadets chase them around Kyle Field behind the 20 yard line, and, once they are captured, carry them across campus and toss them into Rudder Pond, a fountain full of cold water. After the last Yell Leader has been thrown into Rudder Pond, the soaking-wet Yell Leaders lead the fans in a yell practice against the following week's opponent.

== List of Yell Leaders ==
The following is a list of Yell Leaders since 1970:

Year	Head Yell Leader	Yell Leader 1	Yell Leader 2	Yell Leader 3	Yell Leader 4
1970-1971	Keith Chapman ‘71	Tommy Butler ‘71	Barrett Smith ‘71	Tommy Orr ‘72	Rick Perry '72
1971-1972	Jim Ferguson ‘72	Tommy Orr ‘72	Rick Perry '72	Henry Paine ‘73	Clarence Long ‘73
1994-1995	Scott Torn '95	Scott Whitaker '95	Trent Ashby '95	Henry Hewes '96	David Kemp ‘96
1997-1998	Tim Duffy '98	Brandon Meche '98	Kyle Sparkman '98	Brandon Neff '99	Sam Blunzter '99
1999-2000	Jeff Bailey '00	John Bloss '00	Dusty Batsell '00	Bubba Moser '01	Ricky Wood '01
2000-2001	Ricky Wood '01	Bubba Moser '01	Ben Cholick '01	Kevin Graham '02	Sam Seidel '02
2001-2002	Sam Seidel '02	Kevin Graham'02	Boo Boo Davies '02	Cardo Walthall '03	Bo Wilson '03
2002-2003	Cardo Walthall ’03	Bo Wilson ’03	Scott Goble ’03	Tim Bailey ’04	Jonathan Lusk ’04
2003-2004	Tim Bailey ’04	Jonathan Lusk ’04	John Magruder ’04	Paul Terrell ’05	Ryan Bishop ’05
2004-2005	Ryan Bishop ’05	Paul Terrell ’05	Houston Haley ’05	Keaton Askew ’06	Patrick Hebert ’06
2005-2006	Patrick Hebert ’06	Keaton Askew ’06	Will Whitehurst ’06	Tyler Wellborn ’07	Grant Castleberry ’07
2006-2007	Grant Castleberry ’07	Tyler Wellborn ’07	Chris Buckner ’07	James Mulvey ’08	Eric Reed ’08
2007-2008	Eric Reed ’08	James Mulvey ’08	Grant Jungeblut ’08	Lans Martin ’09	Fletcher Massie ’09
2008-2009	Lans Martin ’09	Fletcher Massie ’09	Ben Debayle ’09	Weston Wilcox ’10	Casey Schaefer ’10
2009-2010	Casey Schaefer ’10	Weston Wilcox ’10	Reagan Thompson ’10	Travis Kennedy ’11	John Busch ’11
2010-2011	Brett Bergamo ’11	John Busch ’11	Travis Kennedy ’11	David Benac ’12	Austin Trahan ’12
2011-2012	David Benac ’12	Patrick Ivey ’12	Austin Walker ’12	Nelson Ingram ’13	Josh Light ’13
2012-2013	Nelson Ingram ’13	Hunter Skoog ’13	Drew Nelson ’13	Hunter Cook ’14	Ryan Crawford ’14
2013-2014	Ryan Crawford ’14	Hunter Cook ’14	Chris Powell ’14	Roy May ’15	Patrick McGinty ’15
2014-2015	Patrick McGinty ’15	Roy May ’15	Shaquille Gould ’15	Ben Ritchie ’16	Zach Lawrence ’16
2015-2016	Zach Lawrence ’16	Ben Ritchie ’16	Steven Lanz ’16	Will Alders ’17	Chris Wilder ’17
2016-2017	Chris Wilder ’17	Spencer Old ’17	James Pace ’17	Ian Moss ’18	Cooper Allen Cox ’18
2017-2018	Ian Moss ’18	Cooper Allen Cox ’18	Ken Belden '18	Gavin Suel '19	Connor Joseph '19
2018-2019	Gavin Suel ’19	Connor Joseph ’19	Blake Jones ’19	Reid Williams ’20	Karsten Lowe ’20
2019-2020	Karsten Lowe ’20	Reid Williams ’20	Kenny Cantrell ’20	Keller Cox ’21	Jacob Huffman ’21
2020-2021	Keller Cox ’21	Jacob Huffman ’21	Weston Porter ’21	Memo Salinas ’22	Mason Graham ’22
2021-2022	Memo Salinas ’22	Noah Ferguson ’22	Woods Johnson ’22	Kipp Knecht ’23	Zac Cross ’23
2022-2023	Zac Cross ’23	Kipp Knecht ’23	Nathan Drain ’23	Thomas Greve ’24	Trevor Yelton ’24
2023-2024	Trevor Yelton '24	Ethan Davis '24	Thomas Greve '24	Jake Carter '25	Grayson Poage '25
2024-2025	Jake Carter '25	Grayson Poage '25	Josiah Brantley '25	Kyler Fife '26	Luke Widener '26
2025-2026	Kyler Fife '26	Luke Widener '26	Heath Flanagan '26	Luke Rollins '27	Josh Brewton '27

== Pass-backs ==
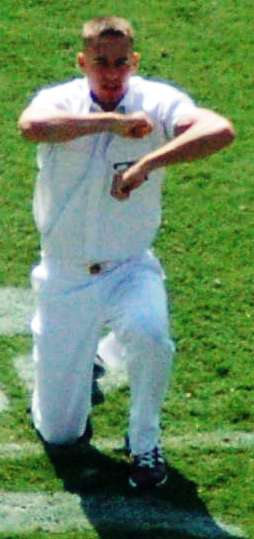
The "Farmers fight" rotating arm motion
