= Kyle Field =

Football stadium on the campus of Texas A&M University in College Station, Texas

Coordinates: 30.6099°N 96.3405°W

- "Home of the 12th Man"
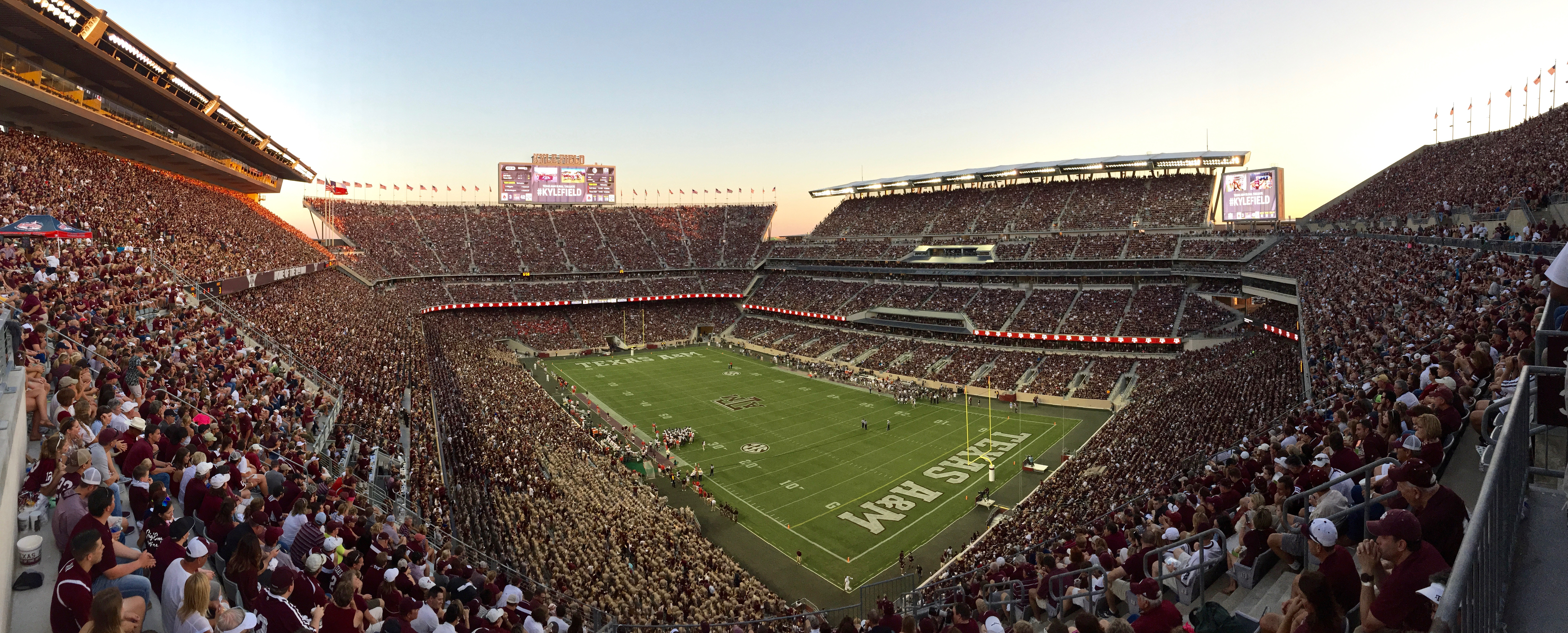
- A panorama of the interior of Kyle Field, 2015
- Interactive map of Kyle Field
- Location: 756 Houston Street, College Station, Texas 77843, United States
- Capacity: 102,733 (2015–present) Former capacity List: 106,511 (2014); 82,589 (2012–2013); 83,002 (2008–2011); 82,600 (2001–2007); 80,650 (1999–2000); 58,292 (1998); 70,210 (1992–1997); 72,387 (1982–1991); 70,016 (1980–1981); 54,000 (1977–1979); 48,000 (1967–1976); 41,500 (1953–1966); 40,000 (1949–1952); 32,890 (1927–1948); 8,500 (1923–1929); 6,800 (1915–1923)
- Surface: Latitude 36 Bermudagrass (2017–present); Tifway 419 Bermudagrass (1996–2017); AstroTurf (1970–1995); Grass (1927–1969)
- Scoreboard: (1x) 163 feet wide by 47 feet high (2x) 54 feet wide by 36 feet high
- Record attendance: Football: 110,633 (October 11, 2014, vs. Ole Miss); Soccer: 91,102 (June 6, 2026, Argentina v Honduras); Concert: 110,905 (George Strait, June 15, 2024)

Construction
- Opened: September 23, 1905; 121 years ago
- Renovated: 1953, 1967, 2003, 2014–2015
- Expanded: 1915, 1923, 1927, 1953, 1967, 1980, 2000, 2014–15
- Cost: $650 (original grandstand cost, $25,155 in 2025 dollars) $483,888,885 (2014–2015 expansion)
- Architects: F. E. Geisecke (original structure); Lockwood, Andrews & Newnam, Inc. (North End zone addition, 1978 Expansion, 1966 Expansion); Populous (2014–2015 Redevelopment)
- General contractors: J. E. Johnson Construction Co. (original construction); Manhattan-Vaughn (2014–2015 Redevelopment)

Tenants
- Texas A&M Aggies football (NCAA) (1905–present)

Website
- 12thman.com/kyle-field

Kyle Field is an American football stadium in College Station, Texas, located on the campus of Texas A&M University. It has been the home to the Texas A&M Aggies football team in rudimentary form since 1904, and as a permanent concrete stadium since 1927. The seating capacity of 102,733 in 2021 makes it the largest in the Southeastern Conference (SEC) and the fourth-largest stadium in the NCAA, the fourth-largest stadium in the United States, and the sixth-largest non-racing stadium in the world and the largest in Texas.

Kyle Field's largest game attendance was 110,633 people when Texas A&M lost to the Ole Miss Rebels by the score of 35–20 on October 11, 2014. This was the largest football game attendance in the state of Texas and SEC history at the time. The record for a game involving an SEC team was surpassed by the Battle at Bristol.

Kyle Field played host to the largest ticketed concert in United States history in June 2024, when George Strait played before a crowd exceeding 110,000.

== History ==
=== Beginning ===
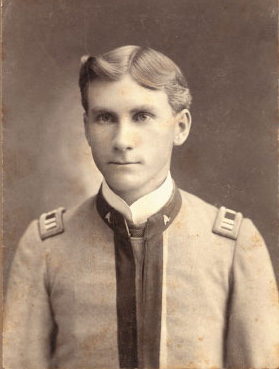
Edwin Jackson Kyle, Texas A&M graduate who contributed to the construction of a field

In the fall of 1904, Edwin Jackson Kyle, an 1899 graduate of Texas A&M and professor of horticulture, was named president of the General Athletics Association. Kyle wanted to secure and develop an athletic field to promote the school's athletics. Texas A&M was unwilling to provide funds, so Kyle fenced off a section of the southwest corner of campus that had been assigned to him for agricultural use. Using $650 of his own money, he purchased a covered grandstand from the Bryan fairgrounds and built wooden bleachers to raise the seating capacity to 500 people.

On November 11, 1904, the Texas A&M Board of Directors set this area as a permanent athletic field, which served as the home for the football and baseball teams. After the stands were built, students supported naming the field after its founder and builder.

The first football game was played on Kyle Field in 1905, when A&M defeated Houston YMCA 29-0. The fenced area was 250,000 m2 and can accommodate nearly 500 people on its wooden bleachers. Accordingly, in 1906, the Corps of Cadets unofficially named the field "Kyle Field" in Kyle's honor.

Though some sources suggest the November 21, 1921 game between the Texas A&M Aggies and their archrival the University of Texas at Kyle Field became the first college football game to offer a live, play-by-play broadcast on radio, this claim is incorrect. The first live, play-by-play broadcast on radio of a college football game occurred October 8, 1921 at Forbes Field when KDKA-AM broadcast a Pittsburgh vs. West Virginia game. The Texas Historical Commission installed a historical marker at Kyle Field in 2005 indicating that, while it was not the first broadcast in the US, it is believed to be the first in Texas.

=== Facility improvements ===
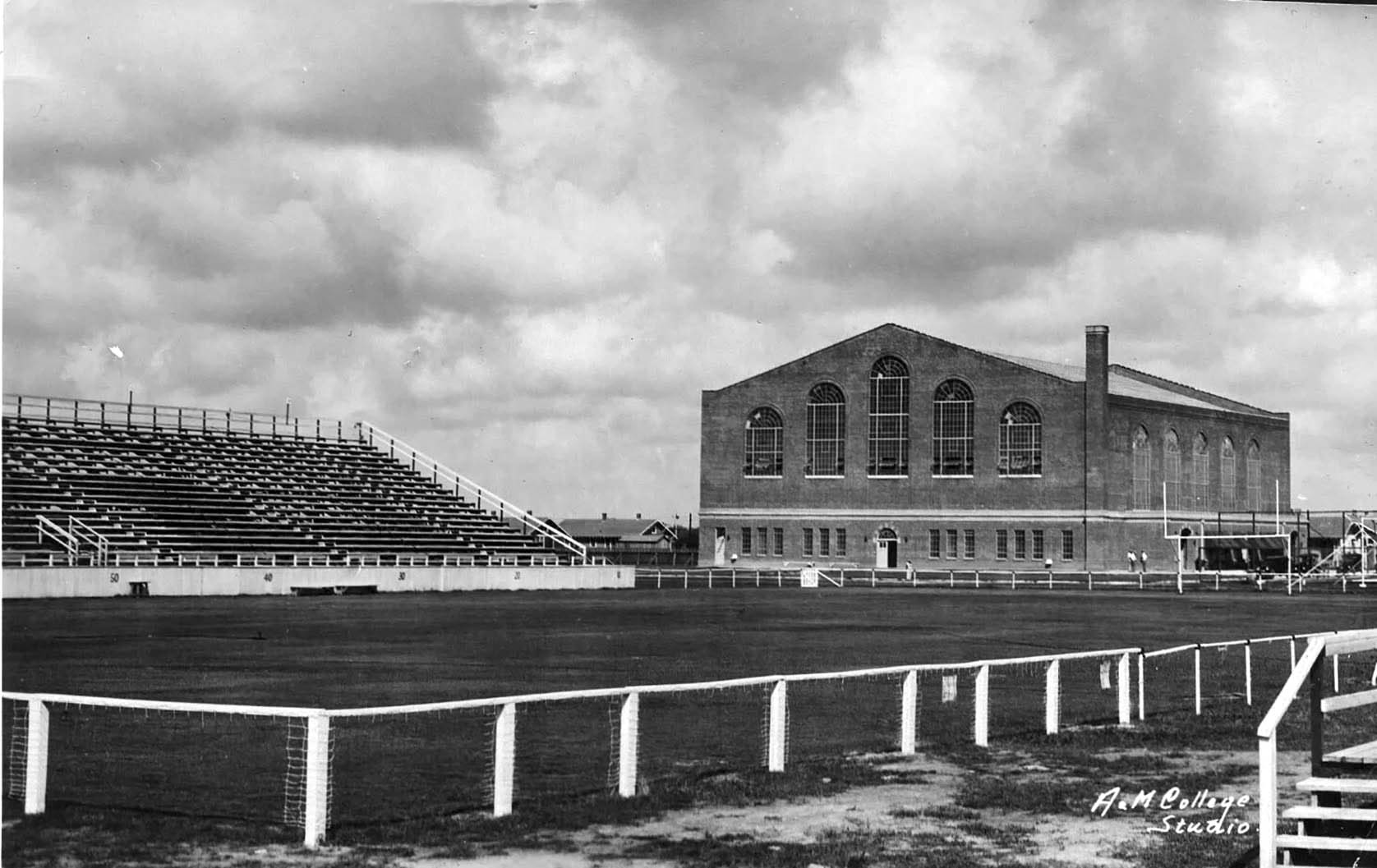
Kyle Field in 1925

The Aggies enjoyed an undefeated season in 1919, accumulating a combined score of 275–0. Aggie supporters began to clamor for a permanent stadium, but only $2,400 was raised by 1920. In 1927, the school chose to build a new concrete stadium, at a cost of $345,001.67 or $365,000, depending on the source.

The new stadium—roughly corresponding to the lower half of the current structure's east and west grandstands—opened later that year. By 1929, the stadium had become a 32,890-seat horseshoe, with temporary seating for an additional 5,000. The space inside the horseshoe was sufficient to allow a track surrounding the field. Capacity was raised to 41,500 in 1953 when a partial second deck and a pressbox were added at a cost of $346,000.

In 1956, the Texas A&M Board of Regents officially named the stadium "Kyle Field," though it had been unofficially called by that name for over half a century. Although some believe that the field was instead named after Dr. J. Allen Kyle, a member of the Board of Directors from 1911 to 1915, the Board of Directors decreed that Kyle Field was in fact named for E.J. Kyle (Class of 1899).

More of second deck and other improvements were added in 1967 to raise the capacity to 48,000 at a cost of $1.84 million. In 1974, two large flagpoles were added at the south end of the stadium in memory of Lt. William B. Blocker, (Texas A&M Class of 1945).

Expansion continued in 1980, when a third deck was added to Kyle Field, bringing the capacity to 70,000. Construction took place during the football season, and students were allowed into the area as each row of seating was added. In 1981, 16-foot-high (4.9 m) letters spelling out "KYLE FIELD" were installed.

The Bernard C. Richardson Zone was added in 1999 at a cost of $32.9 million raising the capacity to 82,600. For high-demand games, temporary bleachers were installed in the south end zone and folding chairs were placed on the sidelines. In the fall of 2003, the Bright Football Complex was completed on the south end of the stadium. The facility (named for its principal donor, former Dallas Cowboys owner Bum Bright) includes a players' lounge overlooking Kyle Field, dressing rooms, one of the largest training and rehabilitation facilities in the country, and a state-of-the-art academic center.

The field had a grass playing surface until 1970, when Astroturf was installed. Natural turf was reinstalled on the field for the 1996 season. Since that time, the turf has consistently received praise from players and coaches. For their efforts, the groundskeepers were honored in 2004 as the winners of the STMA College Football Field of the Year.

==== 2013–2015 renovation ====
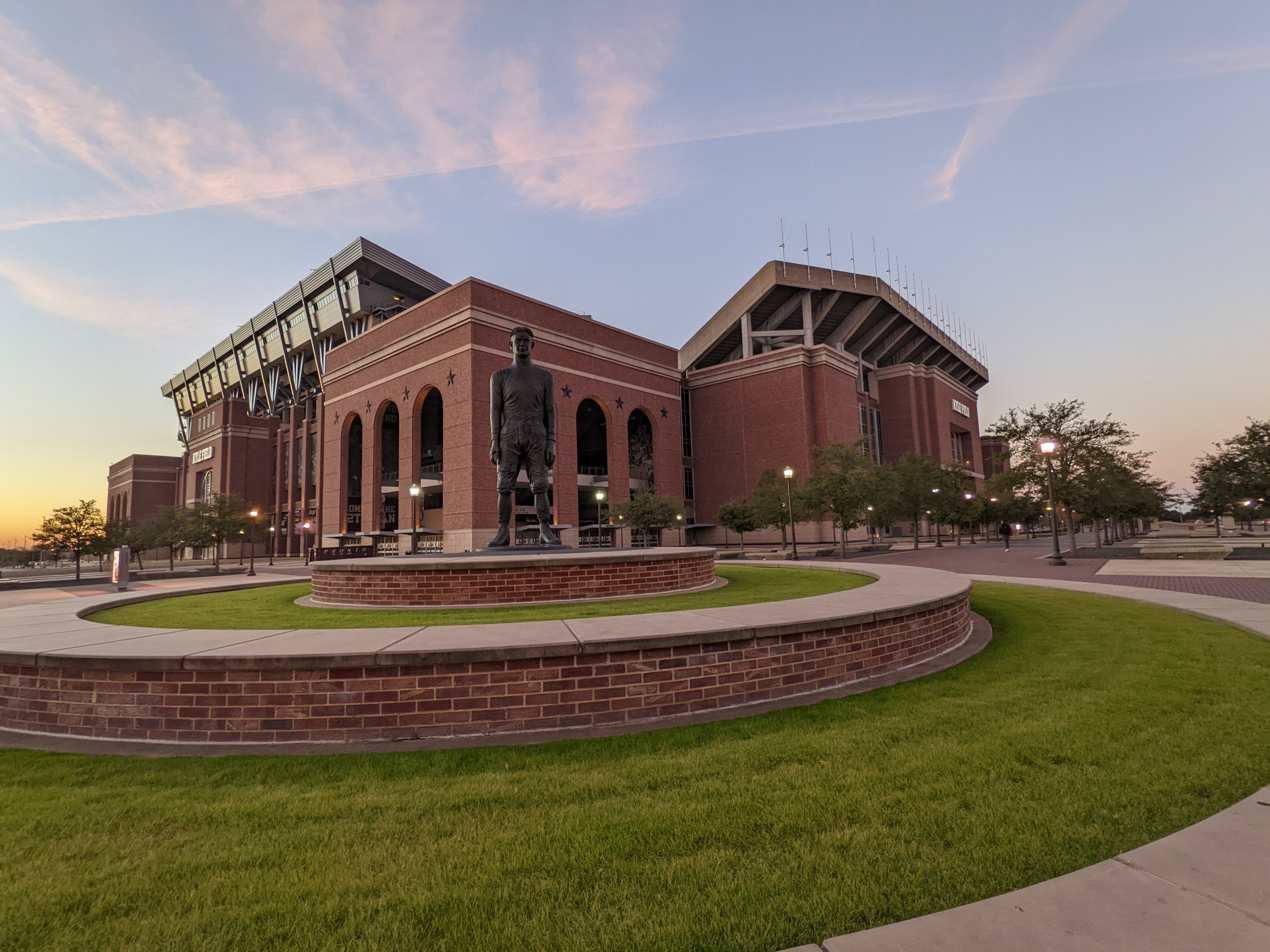
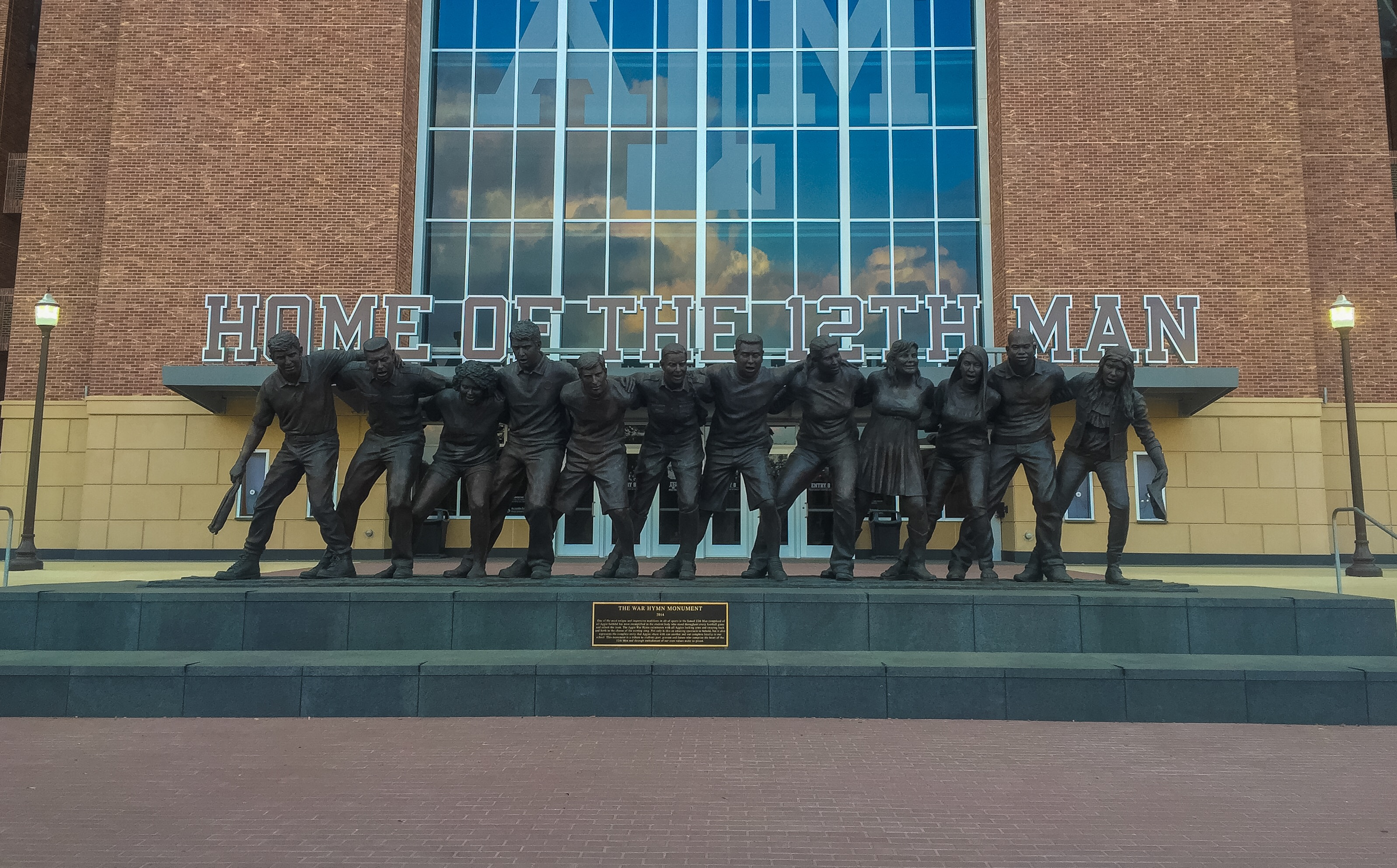
(Left): 12th Man Statue and Kyle Field added with renovations; (right): The War Hymn Movement statue erected in 2014

On May 1, 2013, the Texas A&M Board of Regents approved a $485 million rebuild of Kyle Field. The renovation would temporarily raise the official seating capacity to 106,511 people for the 2014 season, making it the largest football stadium in Texas and the SEC (surpassing Neyland Stadium by 57 seats) and the third largest football stadium in the country.

The renovation was done in two distinct phases geared around the football season, and began immediately after the conclusion of the final 2013 season game in November with the implosion of the student section side. The stadium renovation was complete by the beginning of the 2015 season bringing the official capacity to 102,733. Per local media, KBTX, major milestones for the Kyle Field project were as follows, with construction sequenced and phased to allow the playing of regular home football games in the stadium for the 2013, 2014, and 2015 seasons. The renovation was completed ahead of schedule and under budget.

- Phase I (November 2013): Demolition of the first deck of the east side of the stadium, reconstruction of the first deck, and construction of the south end zone, which includes seating, media interview areas, 12th Man Productions and related gameday support, and a commissary and recruiting area.
- Phase II (November 2014): Demolition of the entire west side of the stadium, complete construction of the south end zone, and reconstruction of the west side. This included the removal of the last remnant of the original 1927 stadium, leaving the east side second deck (constructed in 1967) as the oldest part of the current stadium.

Other significant items included in the scope of work for the Kyle Field redevelopment included:

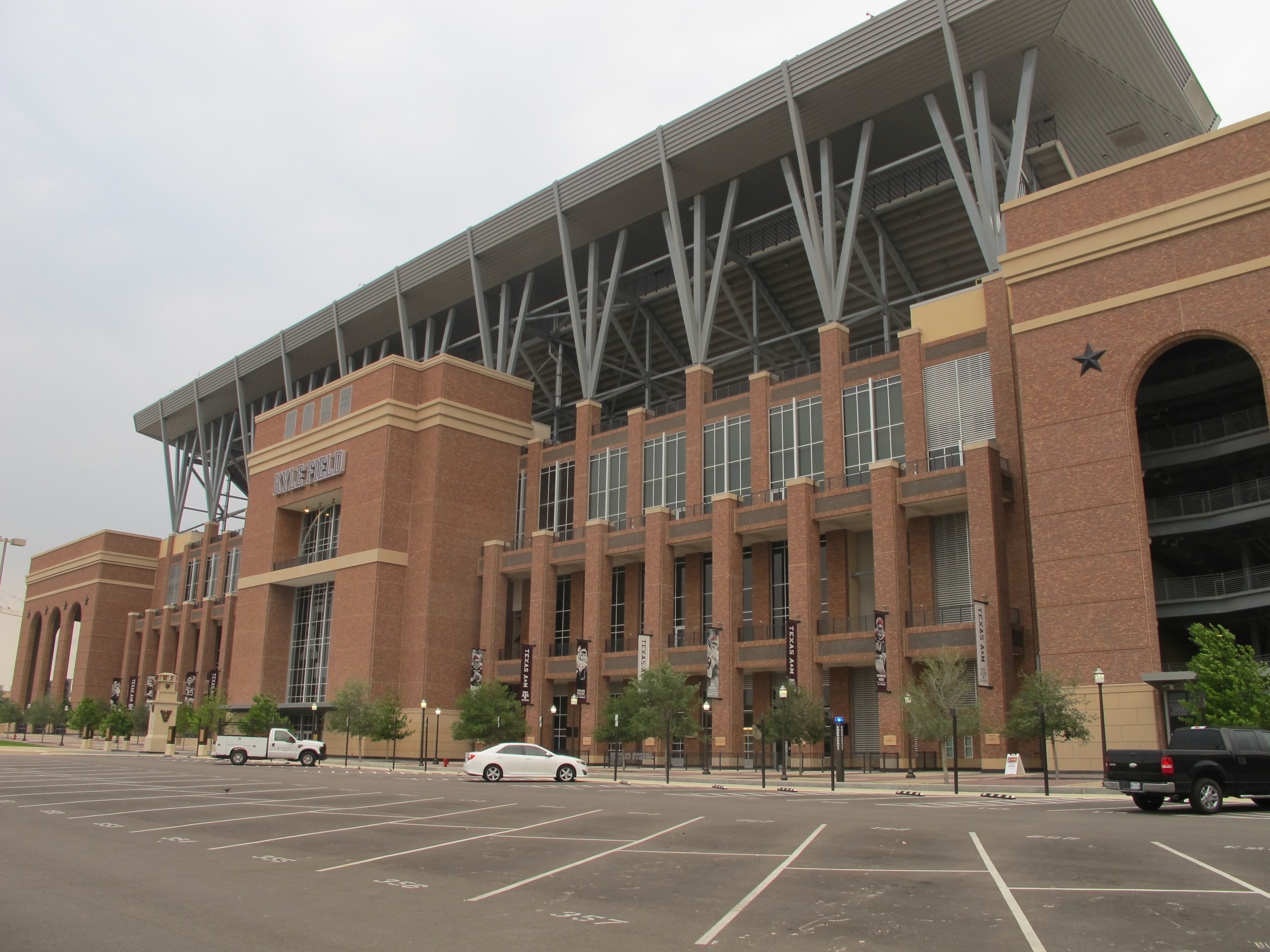
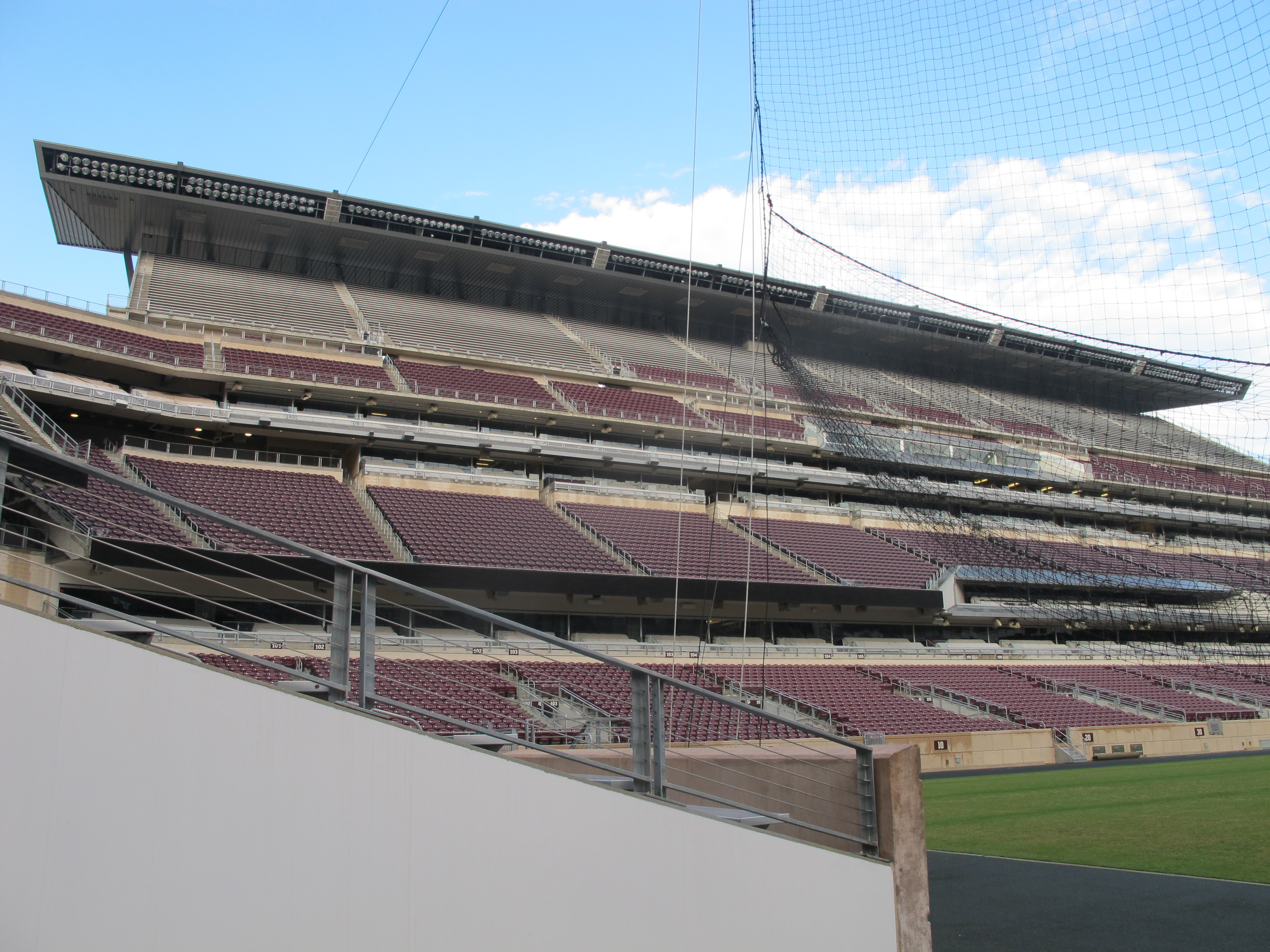
Kyle Field's new facade (left) and grandstand (right), both pictured in 2016
- Demolition of the Read Building, G. Rollie White Coliseum, and the Netum Steed strength and conditioning facility, all of which are adjacent to or part of Kyle Field
- Construction of a new strength and conditioning laboratory training area on the university's west campus
- Lowering of the playing field by approximately 7 feet and relocation of the playing surface approximately 18 feet to the south allowing for an additional six rows of seating around the stadium
- Relocation of the existing south end zone scoreboard and video board reusing appropriate components to provide a scoreboard facility on the exterior of the north end zone structure: New interior scoreboard locations will be established in the south end zone and the northeast and northwest corners of the developed stadium.
- Construction of widened, tree-lined walkways along both sides of Houston Street from George Bush Drive to the stadium east mall area
- The new "South Side Upper Level" (with addition of an upper seating deck and concourse), has an estimated seating capacity of 12,000 with the future potential of an additional 7,000 seats, with seating to be located both below and above the new upper concourse.

== Stadium features ==
=== Bernard C. Richardson Zone ===
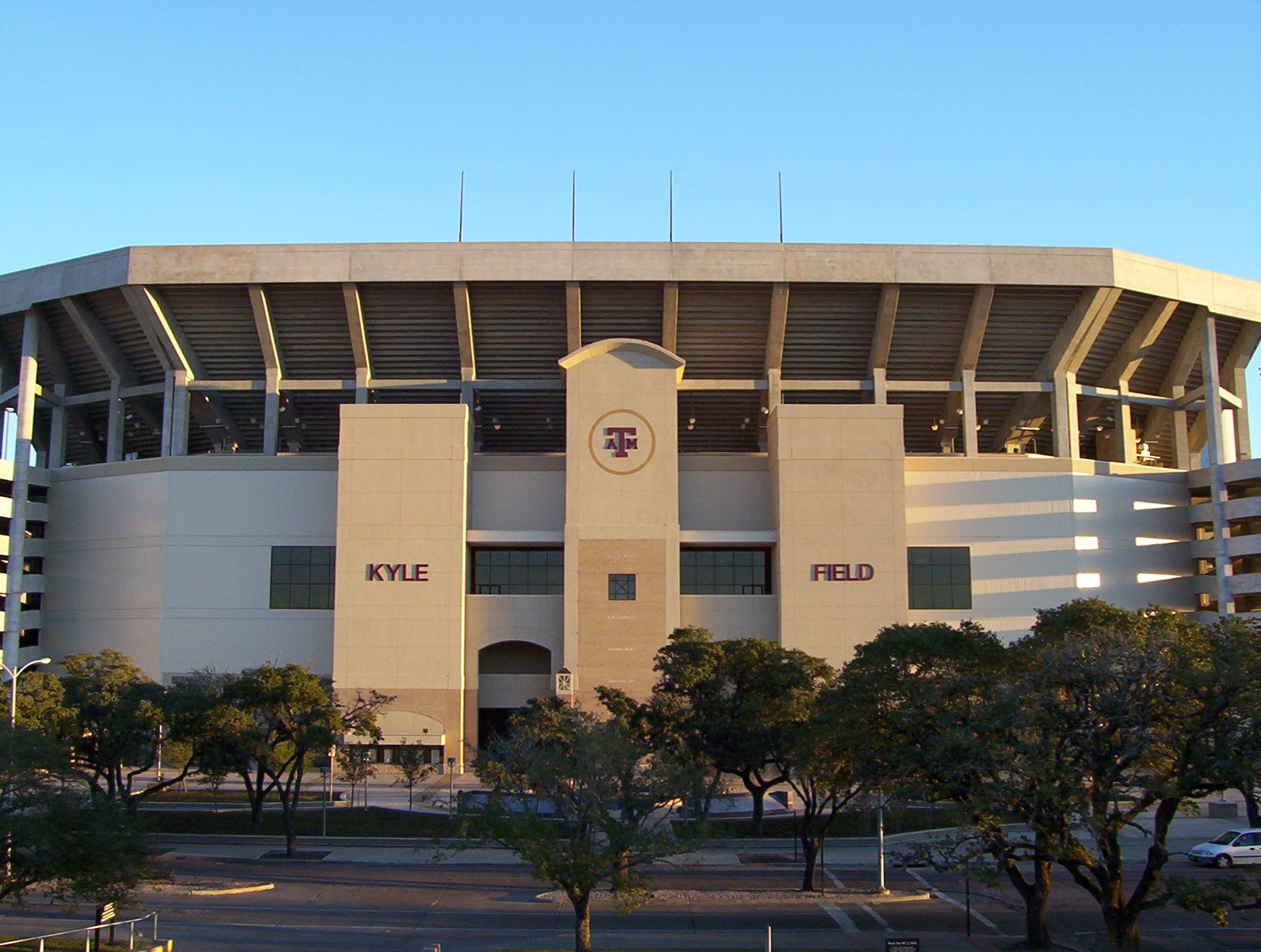
Bernard C. Richardson Zone in 2007

The Bernard C. Richardson Zone, named for a 1941 petroleum engineering graduate and a Texas A&M Distinguished Alumnus, is located at the north end of Kyle Field, replacing the former single-deck horseshoe which connected the east and west wings of the stadium. This $32.9 million expansion added over 20,000 seats, and sits 65 feet (20 m) closer to the field than the previous seating. The Zone unofficially opened for the memorial vigil following the 1999 Texas A&M Bonfire Collapse, and then at full capacity the next day for the grudge match against the University of Texas, setting a then-state-record of 86,128 fans attending. For the next several years the Aggies saw consecutive record-breaking attendance figures for the season.

The ground level of The Zone contains the Texas A&M Sports Museum, the nation's only all-sports museum funded primarily by former athletes (The Texas A&M Letterman's Association). The museum contains rotating exhibits focusing on various varsity sports at Texas A&M, while permanent exhibits trace the history of the school sports and some of the more treasured traditions.

The Zone contains four levels of seating areas, with the first and fourth deck containing bench seating. One deck is comprised completely of luxury boxes, while the last deck is armchair seating. Known as The Zone Club, the 1,900 open-air armchair seats are considered the premier seating area of Kyle Field. The Zone Club sits underneath the fourth deck, meaning the inhabitants are protected from rain, wind, and the blazing Texas sun. The area boasts a full-service bar and concession areas, with a pre-game buffet offered for those with seats in the area. The Zone Club also has sixteen televisions stationed in various areas so that attendees can also keep an eye on other games being played around the country.

=== Old press box ===
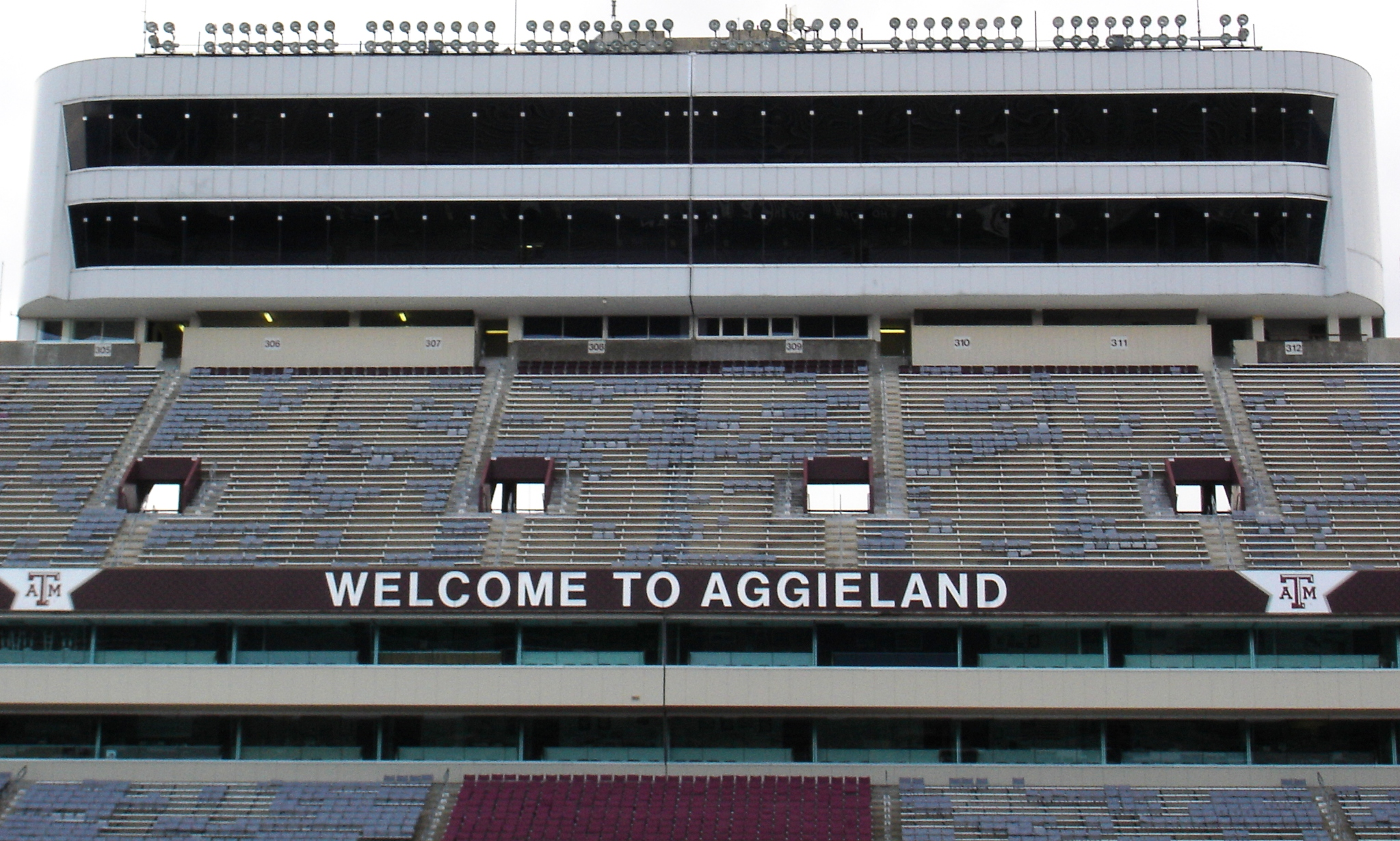
The old press box located on top of west deck

The old Kyle Field press box was located at the top of the west deck of the stadium, sitting over 120 feet (37 m) above the field. The pressbox had two tiers, accommodating over 250 members of the press, with print journalists stationed in the upper tier and radio and television journalists sitting in the lower tier.

During the singing of the Aggie War Hymn, in which Aggie fans link arms and sway in unison throughout the stadium, the entire west upper deck (including the press box) actually swayed, even though the press box was supported by three concrete pillars. This often startled journalists who haven't covered an Aggie home game before, even though a sign in the press box warned, "Please do not be alarmed, the press box will move during the Aggie War Hymn." In 2003, the press box was declared a high-rise building, and Texas A&M was forced to renovate it to meet federal, state, and local regulations regarding fire safety and the Americans with Disabilities Act. Renovations before the 2014 season lessened the swaying effect somewhat.

=== 12th Man TV ===
During the 2006 offseason, the older Jumbotron was removed and replaced by a 3,954-square-foot (367.3 m^{2}) Mitsubishi Diamond Vision enhanced resolution LED videoboard in the south end zone, at the time the second largest in college athletics and one of the ten largest in the world. The Texas A&M Athletic Department has dubbed the new screen "12th Man TV", although some fans refer to it as the "Gigatron". The 110-foot-tall (34 m) structure contains 590,000 pixels on 154 video panels with a screen size of 74 by 54 ft (23 by 16 m). The athletic department also updated the media equipment to allow production and broadcast of enhanced definition video to the screen. This addition to Kyle Field was accompanied by LED ribbon boards installed along the facade of the second deck encircling the stadium. At 1,130 feet (340 m), it is the second-longest ribbon board in collegiate sports and second worldwide only to Hard Rock Stadium in Miami. In conjunction with this project, additional upgrades included video board upgrades to Reed Arena and Olsen Field.

Unveiled in September 2014, an LED videoboard that is 47 by 163 feet (7,661 square feet [711.7 m^{2}]) was installed at the south end zone above the new seating, remained as the largest in college athletics until Auburn unveiled a 57-by-190-foot, 10,830-square-foot (1,006 m^{2}) LED videoboard at Jordan–Hare Stadium which was completed in August 2015.

=== Reveille cemetery ===
Reveille cemetery as seen from Kyle Field

When the first Aggie mascot, Reveille, died, she was buried at the north end of Kyle Field so that the score of the Aggie football games was always visible from the site. Subsequent Reveilles were buried alongside her. Construction of the Bernard C. Richardson Zone disrupted the mascot graves, so the graves were temporarily moved across the street from the stadium. Following the completion of the addition, an improved graveyard was dedicated directly outside the Zone and a small electronic scoreboard was mounted on the Zone so that the score would remain visible. Traditionally, when a current or former Reveille died, a military funeral was held at Kyle Field. Over 10,000 people attended the service for Reveille IV. In 2013, Reveille VII, who was retired in May 2008, was given a toned-down memorial service at Reed Arena, rather than a funeral service. According to the Commandant of the Corps, as she is a dog, not a person, he did not believe a 21-gun salute or the playing of "Taps" was appropriate, although he had no involvement in the planning of the memorial service. Some fans were displeased with the changes. It was also announced that the bodies of the previous Reveilles will be exhumed as part of the Kyle Field renovations and relocated across the street, similar to what was done in the previous renovations.

== Notable events ==
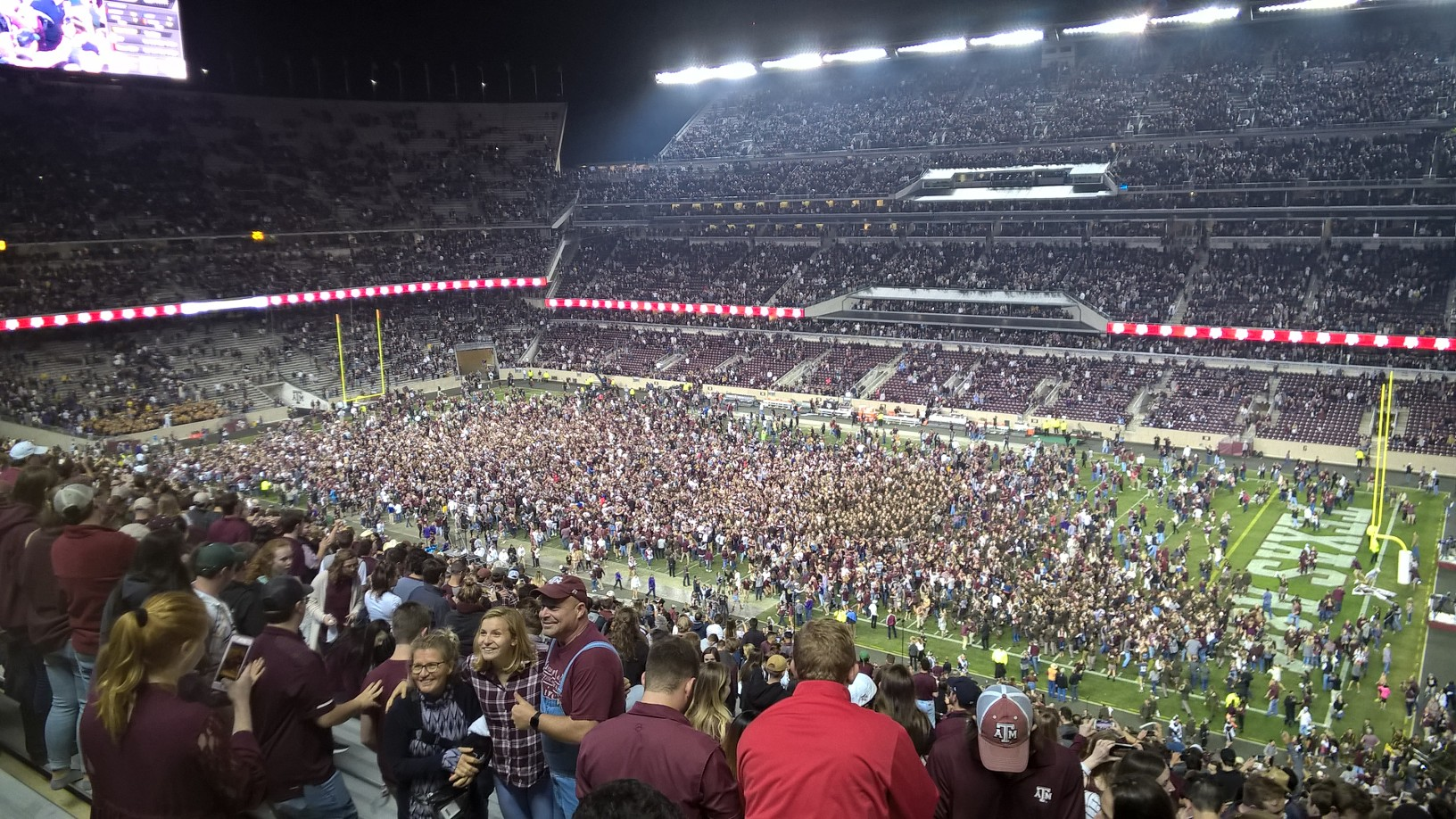
(Left): Red, White, and Blue Out following September 11 attacks; (right): Fans storm the field after defeating LSU in the longest and highest scoring game in Division I FBS history

On November 26, 1999, just one week after the collapse of the Aggie Bonfire, the Aggies beat the 5th-ranked Texas Longhorns 20–16 in an emotional comeback game before a then-record crowd of 86,128. Another notable event occurred on September 22, 2001, 11 days after the September 11 attacks and the first game for the Aggies after the attacks, where the students organized a "Red, White and Blue-Out". Students assigned each deck a different color (red on third deck, white on second deck, and blue on first deck) to wear for the game against Oklahoma State. Despite the short notice, attendees followed the instructions, resulting in a red, white, and blue stadium. More than $150,000 was raised in shirt sales, which was donated to FDNY charities.

Texas A&M's last Big 12 Conference football game and the last scheduled game against the University of Texas Longhorns occurred on November 24, 2011. Texas A&M lost this game 27–25. Notably, this was the second time Texas A&M lost their final game in a conference to the Texas Longhorns at Kyle Field - on December 2, 1995, they lost their final Southwest Conference Game to the Longhorns 16–6, in a game that decided the final SWC championship.

Texas A&M's first Southeastern Conference (SEC) football game occurred on September 8, 2012, against the University of Florida Gators.

=== Soccer ===
On June 8, 2024, in preparation for the upcoming 2024 Copa América held in the United States, Mexico played a friendly match vs Brazil in Kyle Field's first international soccer game in front of 85,249 fans, a 3–2 win in favor of the Brazilians.

On 6 June, 2026, the Argentina v Honduras set the record for a soccer game held in the stadium with 91,102 spectators, surpassing the Brazil v Mexico match that had been attended by nearly 85,249 in 2024.

=== Concerts ===
Country singer George Strait performed at Kyle Field on June 15, 2024, setting a new attendance record at 110,905 spectators. Strait's concert at Kyle Field became the most-attended (non-festival), ticketed show in US history, with 110,905 fans in attendance. The record was previously held by the Grateful Dead, who played for 107,019 people at Raceway Park in 1977.

== Other uses ==
During summers, young athletes are invited to Kyle Field for football training camps. In the fall, the stadium plays host to various Texas high school football playoff games. The stadium is the home to the Texas A&M Corps of Cadets annual Parents' Weekend Review and Final Review. From 1990 to 2013 it was the venue for the "Cross-Town Showdown" high school football game between the Bryan Vikings and the A&M Consolidated Tigers, arguably the most popular game of the Vikings/Tigers football season. Traditionally the last game of each team's football schedule, beginning in the 2006 season, Texas A&M University requested that the game be held earlier in the year so as not to interfere with Aggie games. In 2013 due to the renovations including a new turf field; Texas A&M requested the Bryan Vikings vs. A&M Consolidated game be held at their home fields beginning 2014 until the renovations are completed. Kyle Field also hosts the Texas A&M University football team for the Maroon & White practice scrimmage during Parent's Weekend each spring.

== Intimidating venue ==
Kyle Field has at times been regarded as one of the most intimidating college football stadiums in the nation by various media outlets and sportswriters. Contributing to its reputation in the 1990s, Texas A&M boasted one of the nation's best home records at 55–4–1, including 31 straight wins at Kyle Field from 1990 to 1995 and 22 straight from 1996 to 2000. From 2000 through 2015, however, the record of Texas A&M at Kyle Field was 70–37 (a winning percentage of 65.4%, down from 93.2% in the 1990s). Through November 14, 2015, the overall Kyle Field record at the site of the playing field is 402–161–19 (70.7%) while the overall record since the stadium's construction in 1927 is 334–156–12 (67.7%).

== Top 10 largest football crowds ==
Rank	Date	Attendance	Opponent	Result
1	October 11, 2014	110,633	Ole Miss	L, 20–35
2	November 6, 2021	109,835	Auburn	W, 20–3
3	November 30, 2024	109,028	Texas	L, 7–17
4	October 26, 2024	108,852	LSU	W, 38–23
5	October 3, 2026	108,657	Arkansas	W, 34–7
6	November 15, 2025	108,582	South Carolina	W, 31–30
7	October 4, 2025	108,572	Mississippi State	W, 31–9
8	September 27, 2025	108,449	Auburn	W, 16–10
9	October 7, 2023	108,101	Alabama	L, 20–26
10	September 5, 2026	107,782	Missouri State	W, 50–0

== See also ==
- List of NCAA Division I FBS football stadiums
- Lists of stadiums
