= MCAA =

MCAA may refer to:

Science

- Monochloroacetic acid

Organizations

- Marine Corps Aviation Association, organization dedicated to the advancement of United States Marine Corps aviation
- Mason Contractors Association of America

Other

- Multilateral competent authority agreement — international tax agreements to exchange information with respect to income earned on digital platforms and offshore financial assets.
