= Bonfire =

Controlled outdoor fire

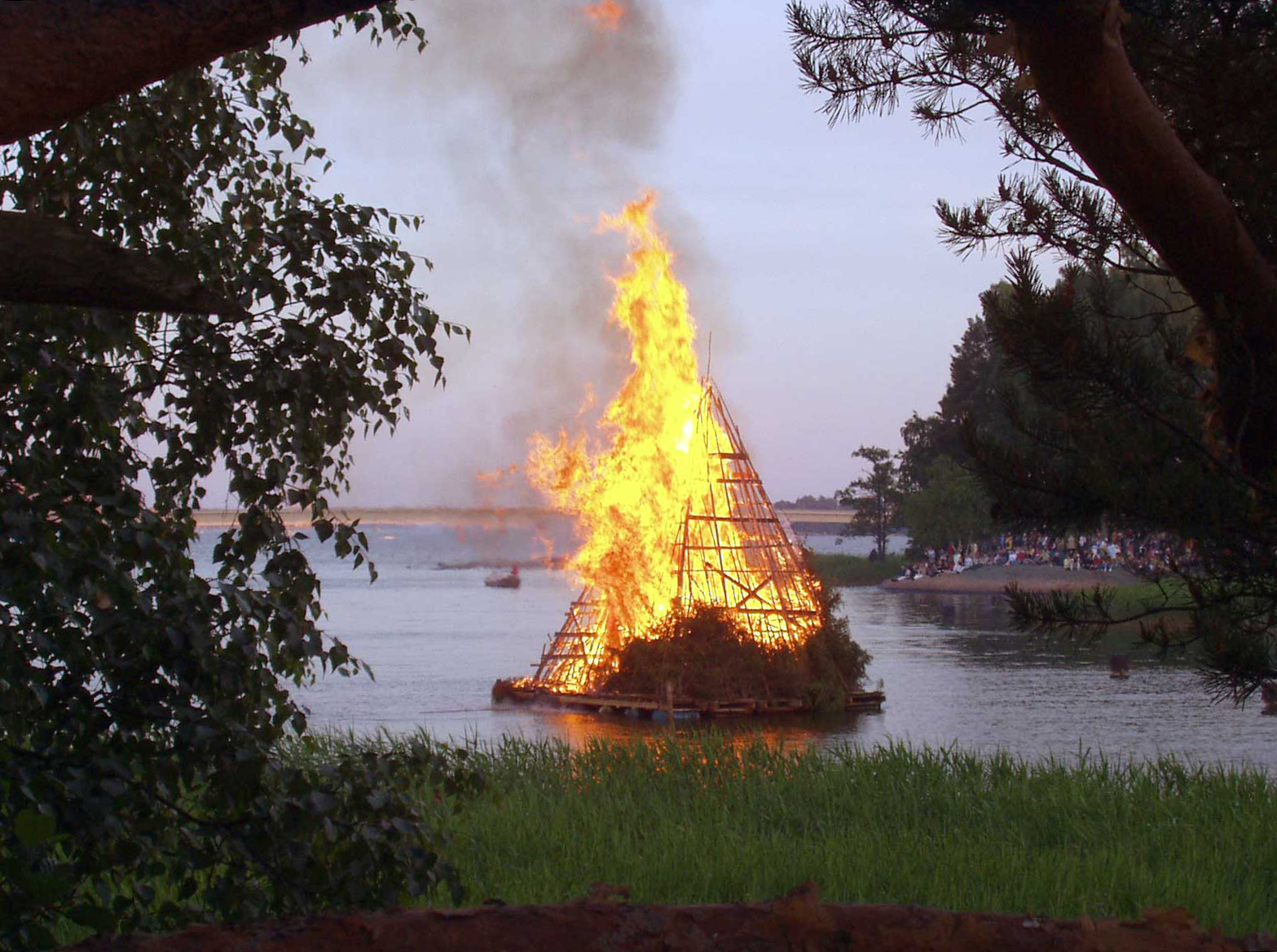
A midsummer bonfire in Seurasaari, Helsinki, Finland

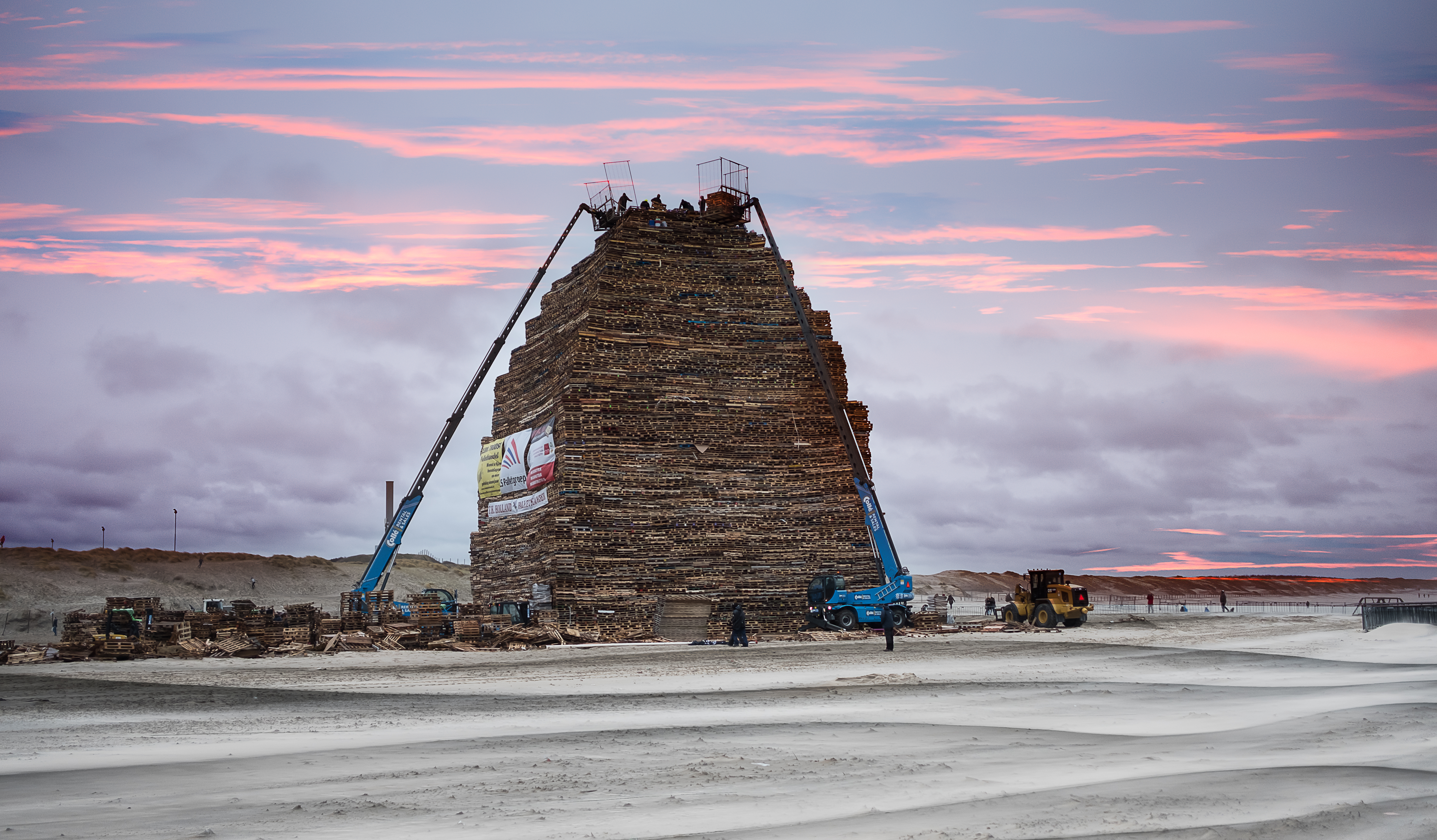
On the beaches of Duindorp (pictured) and Scheveningen, both part of The Hague, teams annually compete to build the world's largest bonfire

A bonfire is a large and controlled outdoor fire, used for waste disposal or as part of a religious feast, such as Saint John's Eve.

== Etymology ==
The earliest attestations date to the late 15th century, with the Catholicon Anglicum spelling it as banefyre and John Mirk's Book of Festivals speaking of a communal fire in celebrations of Saint John's Eve that "was clene bones & no wode & that is callid a bone fyre". The word is thus a compound of "bone" and "fire."

Samuel Johnson's 1755 Dictionary incorrectly analyzed "bon" as the French bon 'good'.

== Regional traditions ==
In many regions of continental Europe, bonfires are made traditionally on 23 June, the solemnity of John the Baptist, as well as on Saturday night before Easter. Bonfires are also a feature of Walpurgis Night in central and northern Europe, and the celebrations on the eve of St. John's Day in Spain. In Sweden bonfires are lit on Walpurgis Night celebrations on the last day of April. In Finland and Norway bonfires are tradition on Midsummer Eve and to a lesser degree in Easter.

=== Alpine and Central Europe ===
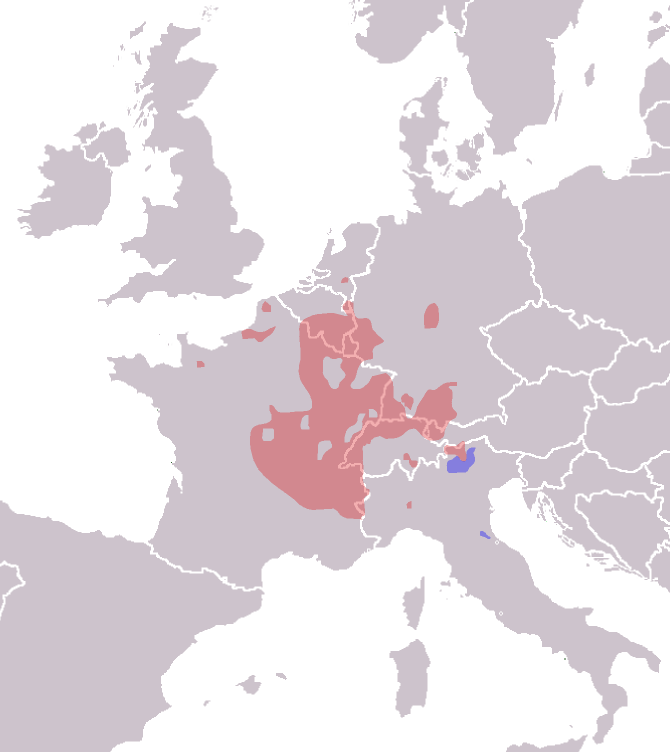
Distribution of Funkenfeuer in Alemannic Europe, France and Northern Italy. Red shows traditions of Funkensonntag (the Sunday following Ash Wednesday), blue shows traditions of 1 March.

Bonfire traditions of early spring, lit on the Sunday following Ash Wednesday (Funkensonntag, otherwise called Quadragesima Sunday), are widespread throughout the Alemannic German speaking regions of Europe and in parts of France. The burning of "winter in effigy" at the Sechseläuten in Zürich (introduced in 1902) is inspired by this Alemannic tradition. In Austria, the custom of the "Osterfeuer" or Easter fires is widespread, but also regulated in some cities, districts and countries to hold down the resulting annual peak of PM10-dust emission. There are also "Sonnwendfeuer" (solstice fires) ignited on the evening of 21 June.

Since 1988 "Feuer in den Alpen" (fires in the Alps) have been lit on a day in August on mountains so they can be seen from afar as an appeal for sustainable development of mountain regions.

In the Czech Republic the festival called "Burning the Witches" (also Philip and Jacob Night, Walpurgis Night, or Beltane) takes place on the night between 30 April and 1 May. This is a very old and still observed folk custom and special holiday. On that night, people gather together, light bonfires, and celebrate the coming of spring. In many places people erect maypoles.

The night between 30 April and 1 May was considered magical. The festival was probably originally celebrated when the moon was full closest to the day exactly between the spring equinox and summer solstice. People believed that on this night witches fly to their Sabbath, and indeed this is one of the biggest pagan holidays. People also believed, for example, in the opening of various caves treasures were hidden. The main purpose of this old folk custom was probably a celebration of fertility.

To protect themselves against witches, people lit bonfires in high places, calling these fires "Burning the Witches". Some people took to jumping over the fire to ensure youth and fertility. The ash from these fires supposedly had a special power to raise crops, and people also walked their cattle through the ashes to ensure fertility.

=== Australia ===
In Australia bonfires are rarely allowed in the warmer months due to fire danger. Legislation about bonfires varies between states, metropolitan and rural regions, local government areas, and property types. For example, in urban areas of Canberra bonfires may be lit around the King's Official Birthday if local fire authorities are notified; however, they are banned the rest of the year. Smaller fires such as campfires and outdoor barbecues are usually permitted outside of fire restriction periods. In the state of Queensland, the rural town of Killarney hosts an annual Bonfire night for the greater community; proceeds support the town's aged care facilities.

=== Canada ===
Hot Bonfire in a Winnipeg Winter

Due to their historic connection to Britain and Ireland, the province of Newfoundland and Labrador has many communities that celebrate bonfire nights, particularly Guy Fawkes Night; this is one of the times when small rural communities come together. In the province of Quebec, many communities light bonfires on 24 June to celebrate Saint-Jean-Baptiste Day.

=== France ===
In France the bonfire celebrates Jean le Baptiste during the Fête de la Saint-Jean ("St John's Day"), first Saturday after the solstice, about 24 June. Like the other countries, it was a pagan celebration of the solstice, or midsummer, but Christianisation transformed it into a Catholic celebration.

=== India ===
In India particularly in Punjab, people gather around a bonfire and eat peanuts and sweets during the festival of Lohri to celebrate the winter solstice which occurred during the Indian month of Magh. People have bonfires on communal land. If there has been a recent wedding or a new born in the family, people will have a bonfire outside their house to celebrate this event. The festival falls in the second week of January every year. In the northeastern state of Assam, the harvest festival of Bhogali Bihu is celebrated to mark the end of the harvest season in mid-January. In southern India, particularly in Andhra Pradesh, Tamil Nadu and Mumbai, the Bhogi Festival is celebrated on the last day of Maarkali, which is also the first day of the farming festival of Pongal. People collect unwanted items from their houses and throw them into a bonfire to celebrate. During the ten days of Vijayadashami, effigies of Ravana, his brother Kumbhakarna and son Meghanad are erected and burnt by enthusiastic youths at sunset. Traditionally a bonfire on the day of Holi marks the symbolic annihilation of Holika the demoness as described above.

=== Iran ===
Chaharshanbe Suri is a fire jumping festival celebrated by Persian people, Kurdish people and some other ethnicities. The event takes place on the eve of the last Wednesday before Nowruz. Loosely translated as Wednesday Light, from the word sur, which means light in Persian, or more plausibly, consider sur to be a variant of sorkh (red) and take it to refer either to the fire itself or to the ruddiness (sorkhi), meaning good health or ripeness, supposedly obtained by jumping over it, is an ancient Iranian festival dating back to at least 1700 BCE of the early Zoroastrian era. Also called the Festival of Fire, it is a prelude to Nowruz, which marks the arrival of spring. The words Chahar Shanbeh mean Wednesday and Suri means red. Bonfires are lit to "keep the sun alive" until early morning. The celebration usually starts in the evening, with people making bonfires in the streets and jumping over them singing "zardi-ye man az toh, sorkhi-ye toh az man". The literal translation is, my yellow is yours, your red is mine. This is a purification rite. Loosely translated, this means you want the fire to take your pallor, sickness, and problems and in turn give you redness, warmth, and energy. There are Zoroastrian religious significance attached to Chahārshanbeh Suri and it serves as a cultural festival for Iranian and Iranic people.

Another tradition of this day is to make special Chaharshanbe Suri Ajil, or mixed nuts and berries. People wear disguises and go door to door knocking on doors as similar to Trick-or-treating. Receiving of the Ajeel is customary, as is receiving of a bucket of water.

Ancient Persians celebrated the last 5 days of the year in their annual obligation feast of all souls, Hamaspathmaedaya (Farvardigan or popularly Forodigan). They believed Faravahar, the guardian angels for humans and also the spirits of dead would come back for reunion. There are the seven Amesha Spenta, that are represented as the haft-sin (literally, seven S's). These spirits were entertained as honored guests in their old homes, and were bidden a formal ritual farewell at the dawn of the New Year. The festival also coincided with festivals celebrating the creation of fire and humans. In Sassanid period the festival was divided into two distinct pentads, known as the lesser and the greater Pentad, or Panji as it is called today. Gradually the belief developed that the 'Lesser Panji' belonged to the souls of children and those who died without sin, whereas 'Greater Panji' was truly for all souls.

=== Iraq ===
In Iraq, Assyrian Christians light bonfires to celebrate the Feast of the Cross. In addition to the bonfire, every household traditionally hangs a lighted fire in the roof of their house.

=== Ireland ===
Throughout Ireland bonfires are lit on the night of 31 October to celebrate Halloween or Samhain. Bonfires are also held on 30 April, particularly in Limerick to celebrate the festival of Bealtaine and on St. John's eve, 23 June, to celebrate Midsummer's eve, particularly in County Cork where it is also known as 'Bonna Night'.

In Northern Ireland, bonfires are lit on Halloween, 31 October, and each 11 July, bonfires are lit by many Protestant communities to celebrate the victory of Williamite forces at the Battle of the Boyne, which took place on 12 July 1690. This is often called the "Eleventh night". Bonfires have also been lit by Catholic communities on 9 August since 1972 to protest and commemorate Internment.

=== Israel ===
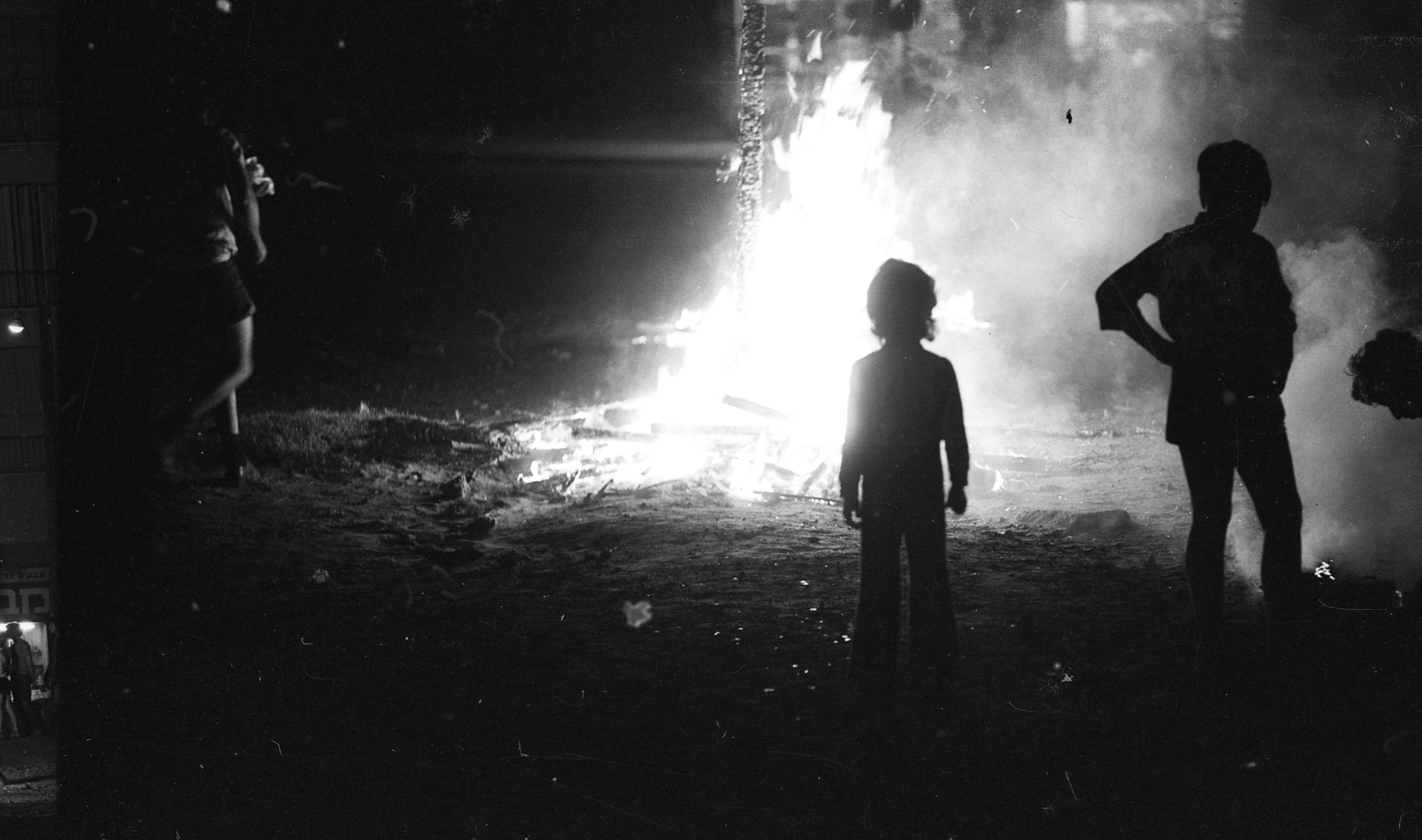
Lag BaOmer kumzits in Israel, 1972. Dan Hadani collection, National Library of Israel

In Israel, on the eve of Lag BaOmer, bonfires are lit on to commemorate the Mishnaic sage Rabbi Shimon Bar Yochai who according to tradition died on Lag BaOmer. Rabbi Shimon Bar Yochai is accredited with having composed the Kabalistic work The Zohar (literally "The Shining" – hence the custom of lighting fire to commemorate him). The main celebration takes place at Rabbi Shimon's tomb on Mount Meron in northern Israel, but all over the country bonfires are lit in open spaces. Linked by Modern Jewish tradition to the Bar Kokhba Revolt against the Roman Empire (132–135 CE), Lag BaOmer is very popularly observed and celebrated as a symbol for the fighting Jewish spirit. As Lag Ba'Omer draws near, children begin collecting material for the bonfire: wood boards and planks, old doors, and anything else made of wood. On the night itself, families and friends gather round the fires and youths will burn their bonfires till daybreak.

=== Italy ===
In Northeast Italy the celebration Panevin (in English "bread and wine"), Foghera and Pignarûl is held on the evening of Epiphany (5 January). A straw witch dressed with old clothes is placed on a bonfire and burned to ash. The witch symbolizes the past and the direction of the smoke indicates whether the new year is going to be good or bad.

The Northern Italian La vecchia ("the old lady") is a version of the wicker man bonfire effigy, which is burned once a year as part of town festivals. As depicted in the film Amarcord by Federico Fellini, it has a more pagan-Christian connotation when it is burned on Mid-Lent Thursday.

In Abbadia San Salvatore, a village in the south of Tuscany, bonfires called fiaccole up to seven meters high are burned during Christmas Eve to warm up people around them waiting for the midnight, following a millenary tradition.

In Southern Italy, traditionally bonfires are lit in the night between 16 and 17 January, thought to be the darkest and longest night of the year. The celebration is also linked to the cult of Saint Anthony The Great.

=== Japan ===
Every 16 August the ancient city of Kyoto holds the Gozan no Okuribi, a Buddhist bonfire-based spectacle, which marks the end of the *O-Bon season.

=== Luxembourg ===
The Luxembourgish town of Remich annually holds a three-day-long celebration for Carnival (called Fuesend Karneval in Luxembourgish). The celebration of the Remich Fuesend Karneval celebrations concludes with the Buergbrennen, a bonfire that marks the end of winter. Such bonfires are also organised by others towns and villages throughout Luxembourg around the same time, although these only last one evening.

=== Nepal ===
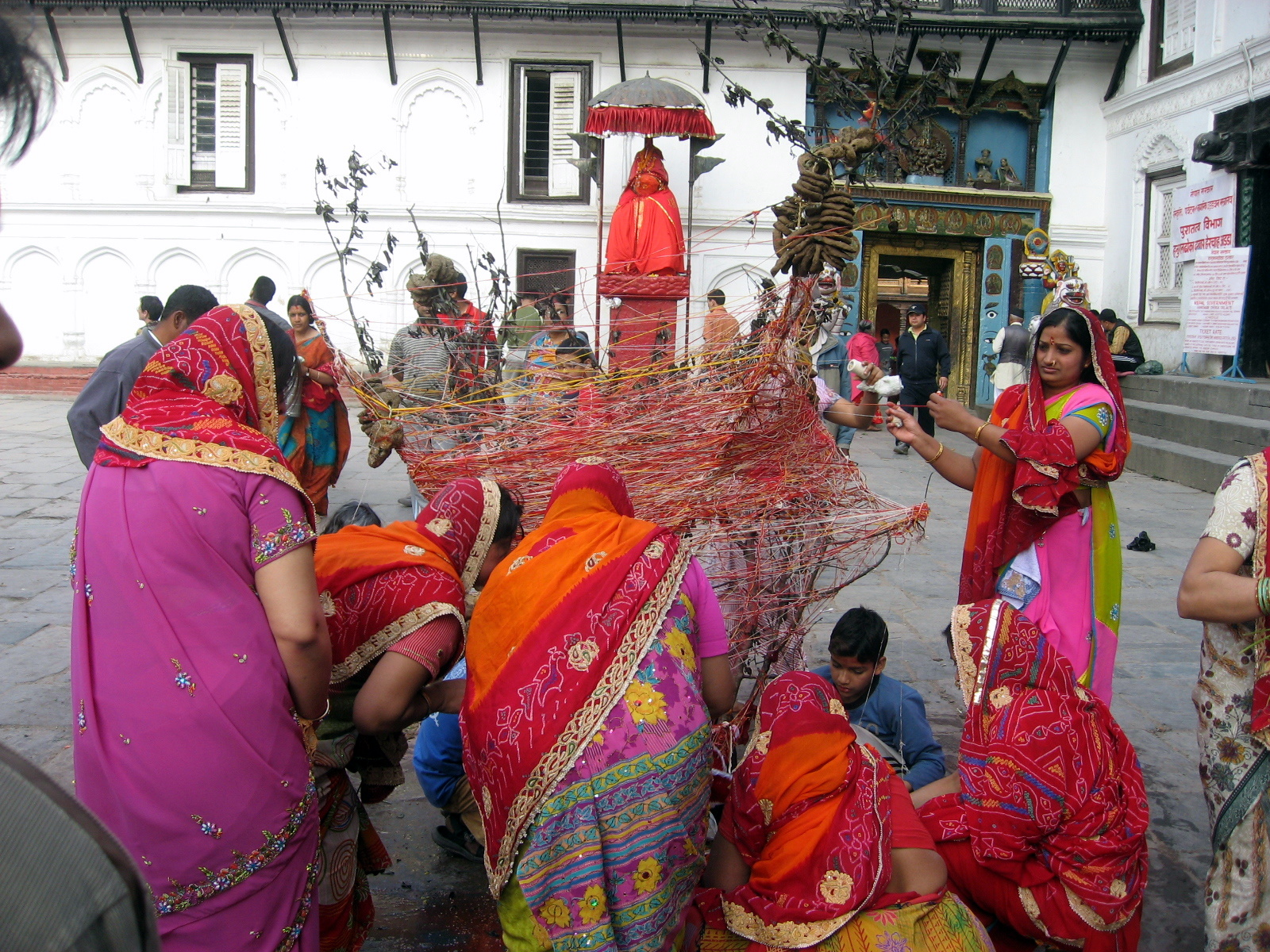
Preparations for Holika Dahan Kathmandu, Nepal

Bonfires in Nepal are taken almost synonymous with camp-fire. During winter months it is quite common to have a bonfire in hotels, resorts, and residential areas, as well as private properties.

Bonfires are also lit during Siva ratri in the evening. This holiday is based on the lunar calendar and often falls during month of February.

=== Nordic Countries ===
In Iceland, bonfires are traditional on New Year's Eve, and on 6 January, which is the last day of the Icelandic Christmas season. In Norway and Denmark, large bonfires are lit on 23 June to celebrate Jonsok or St Hansaften the evening before John the Baptist's birthday. As with many other traditions in Scandinavia, St. Hans is believed to have a pagan origin, the celebration of midsummer's eve.

In Sweden Walpurgis Night is celebrated on 30 April, and festivities include the burning of a bonfire. In Finland, Estonia, Latvia, and Lithuania, Midsummer Eve is celebrated with large bonfires.

==== Lithuania ====
In Lithuania bonfires are lit to celebrate St John's Eve (aka: Rasos (Dew Holiday)) during the midsummer festival. Bonfires may be lit to keep witches and evil spirits away.

=== Poland ===
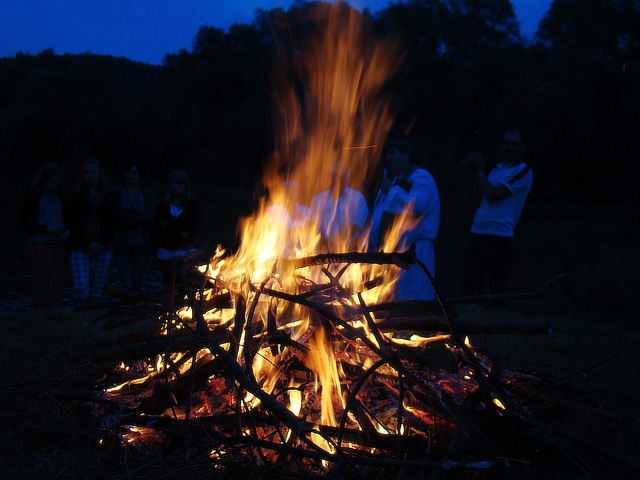
Midsummer fire (sobótka) at San (river), (Poland).

In Poland bonfires are traditionally and still enthusiastic burned during Feast of Saints Peter and Paul, Pentecost day and Saint John Night as Sobótki, ognie świętojańskie(Śląsk, Małopolska, Podkarpacie), Palinocka (Warmia, Mazury, Kaszuby) or Noc Kupały (Mazowsze and Podlasie) on 23/24 June. On 23 and 24 June, according to ancient custom, an immense number of Polish persons of both sexes repaired to the banks of the San (river), Vistula and Odra river, to consult Fate respecting their future fortunes, jumping through a fire on the Eve of Saint John's was a sure way to health. The leaping of the youths over fire (sobótka) must be a custom derived from remote antiquity. Jan Kochanowski, who died in 1584, mentions it in a song from an ancient tradition. Varro and Ovid relate, that in the Palilia, celebrated in honour of the goddess Pales, on 20 April, the anniversary of the foundation of Rome, the young Romans leaped over burning bundles of hay. In modern Italy, this kind of saltation is continued by the name of Sabatina, though Pope Sergius III prohibited it.

=== Romania ===
In Romania, in Argeș County, a bonfire is lit on the night of 25 October every year, as a tradition said to be done since the Dacians. It consists in burning of a tall tree, which resembles the body of a god. It is usually done on a high peak, to be seen from far away.

=== Slavic Europe ===
In Bosnia and Herzegovina, Croatia, Serbia and Slovenia, bonfires are traditionally lit on the evening before 1 May, commemorating Labour Day. Bonfires are also being built on the eve of the Christian holiday Easter on so called Holy Saturday and are lit next day early in the morning. This bonfires are called vuzmenka, or vazmenka. The root, Vazam is the Serbo-Croatian word for Easter. Their burning symbolizes the Resurrection of Jesus. In villages far from cities, this tradition is still active. Young men and children all gather on some plane remote from village and start building a bonfire by collecting logs of wood, or pruned branches from vineyards and orchards. Bonfires are also lit on the evening before Saint George's Day on so called Jurjevo (in Croatia, on 24 April according to Gregorian calendar) or Đurđevdan (in Serbia, on 6 May according to Julian calendar). The ideas for all of these bonfires are probably taken from old Slavic tradition where bonfires were lit to celebrate the arrival of Spring.

==== Czech Republic and Slovakia ====
In the Czech Republic bonfires are also held on the last night of April and are called 'Phillip-Jakob's Night' (FilipoJakubská noc) or "Burning of the Witches" (pálení čarodějnic). They are considered to be historically linked with Walpurgis Night and Beltane. In Slovakia, bonfires are traditionally held on the night of St. John the Baptist, June 24th. These fires are lit on hillsides or in the centers of towns and villages. St. John's Night is legendary, as it is believed that on this night, the earth reveals its hidden treasures.

=== Turkey ===
In Turkey bonfires are lit on Kakava believed to be the awakening day of nature at the beginning of spring. Kakava is celebrated by the Romani people in Turkey on the night of 5–6 May.

=== United Kingdom ===
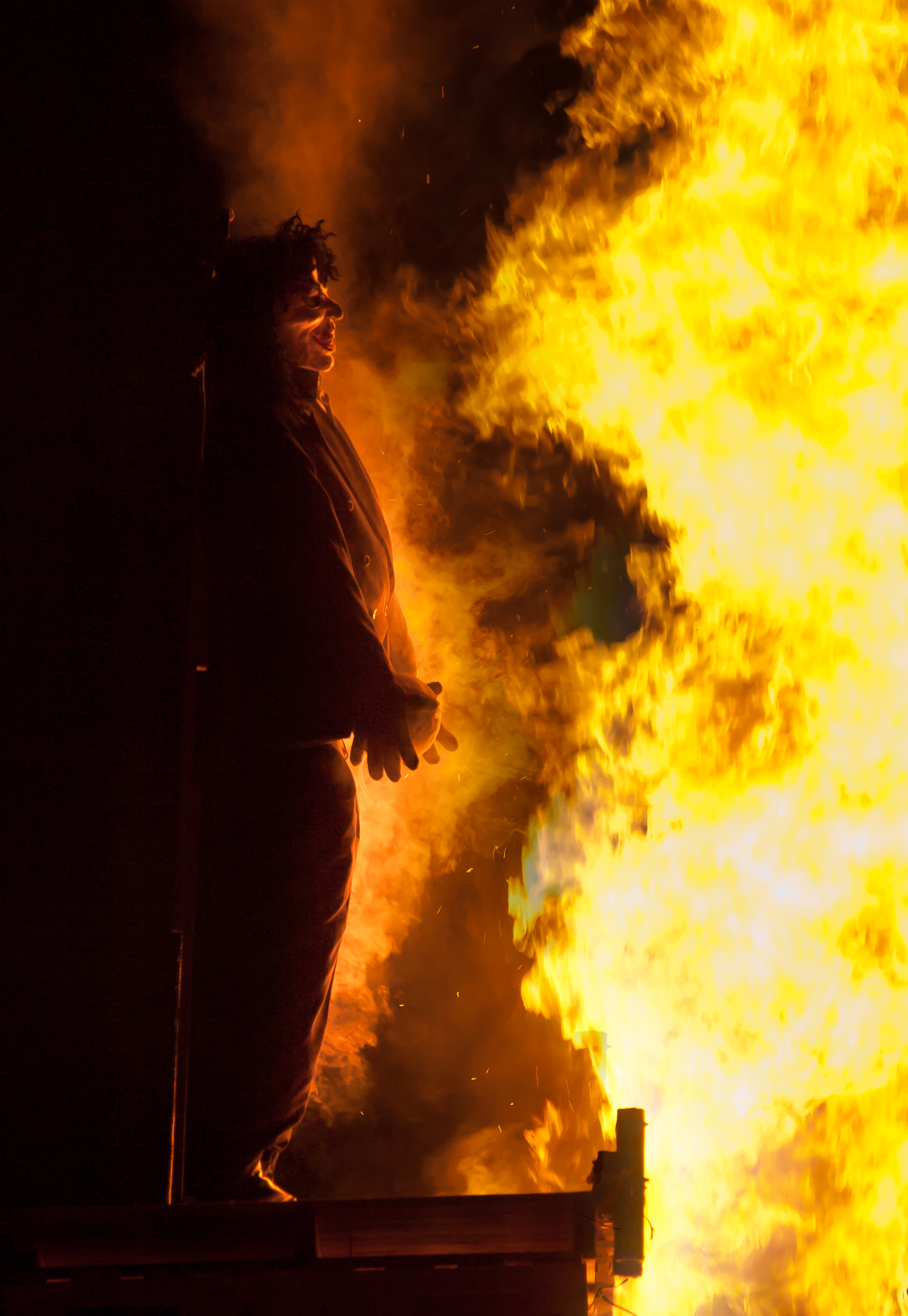
An effigy of Guy Fawkes, burnt on a Guy Fawkes Night bonfire

In the United Kingdom and some Commonwealth countries bonfires are lit on Guy Fawkes Night a yearly celebration held on the evening of 5 November to mark the failure of the Gunpowder Plot of 5 November 1605, in which a number of Catholic conspirators, including Guy Fawkes, attempted to destroy the House of Lords in London.

In Northern Ireland bonfires are lit on Halloween, 31 October. and each 11 July, bonfires are lit by many Protestant communities to celebrate the victory of Williamite forces at the Battle of the Boyne, which took place on 12 July 1690. This is often called the "Eleventh night". Bonfires have also been lit by Catholic communities on 9 August since 1972 to protest and commemorate Internment.

Historically in England, some time before 1400, fires were lit around Midsummer as a wake in the vigil for St John the Baptist. Folk would awake in the evening, and make three manners of fire: one with only clean bones ("bonys") and no wood called a "bonnefyre", one with clean wood and no bones called a "wakefyre", and the third with both bones and wood, called "Saynt Ionys Fyre". Apparently the original wake fell into "lechery and gluttony", so the church deemed it instead as a fast.

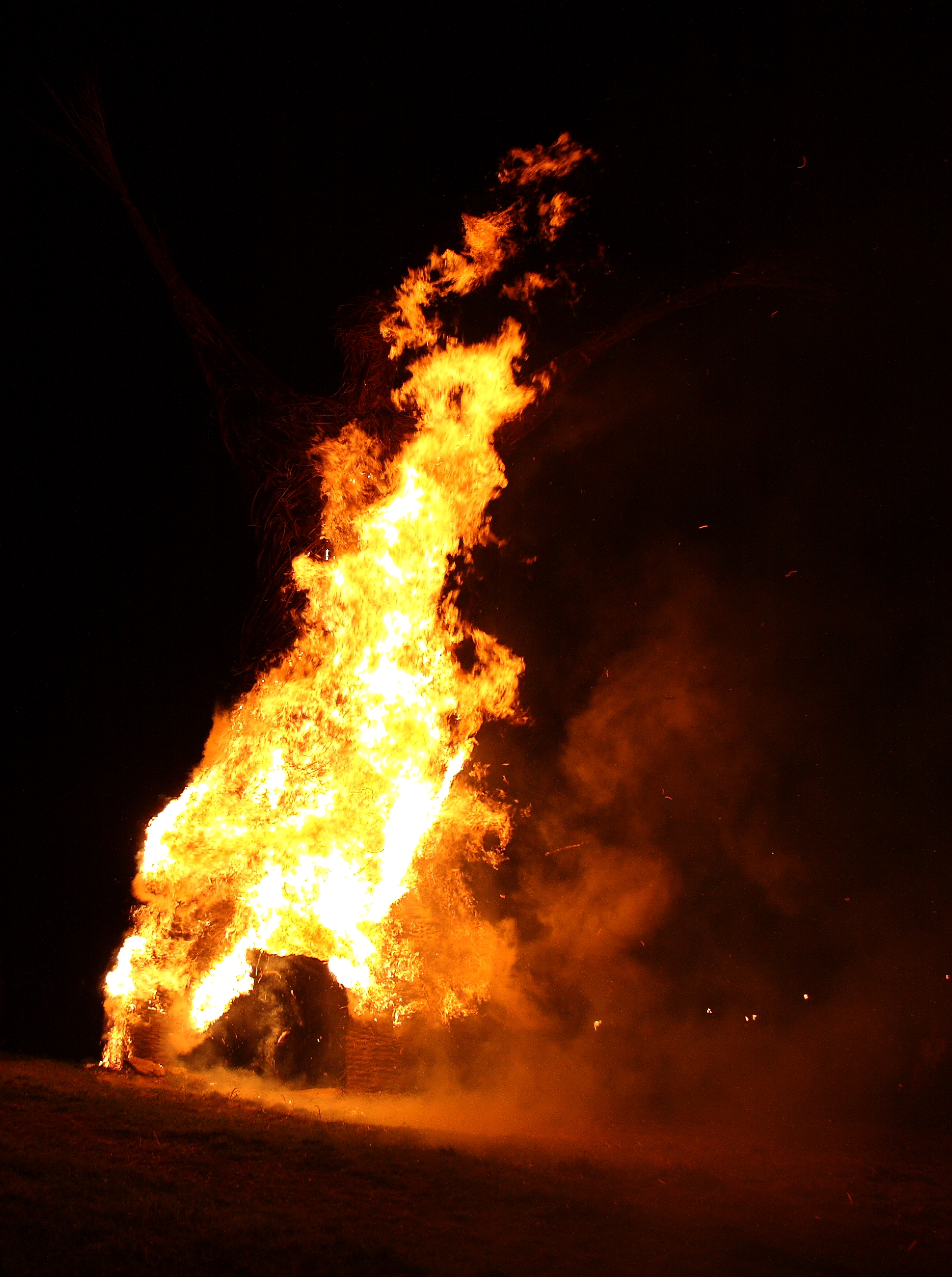
Wicker man effigy on fire at the Archaeolink outdoor museum, Oyne, Aberdeenshire, Scotland

On 20 June 1837 the Broadway Tower, Worcestershire vantage point was used as a bonfire site for Queen Victoria's Jubilee. This was one of 2,548 celebratory bonfires lit across the country.

The annual rock and dance music Wickerman Festival takes place in Kirkcudbrightshire, Scotland. Its main feature is the burning of a large wooden effigy on the last night. The Wickerman festival is inspired by the horror film The Wicker Man, a film itself inspired by the Roman accounts of the Celtic Druids ritual burning of a wicker effigy.

A ship is also burnt as part of the mid-winter Up Helly Aa festival.

In Biggar, Lanarkshire, a bonfire is lit on Hogmanay (New Year's Eve) to celebrate the end of the old year and the beginning of the New Year. The bonfire takes almost a month to build using whatever combustible materials can be found. It is lit by a senior citizen of the town who is accompanied to the bonfire site (which is by the Corn Exchange in the centre of the town) by the local pipe band and several torchbearers. The celebrations are attended by hundreds of drinking and dancing revellers. During the war years, when a bonfire wasn't allowed, a candle was lit in a biscuit tin to keep the tradition of "burnin' oot the auld year" alive.

=== United States ===
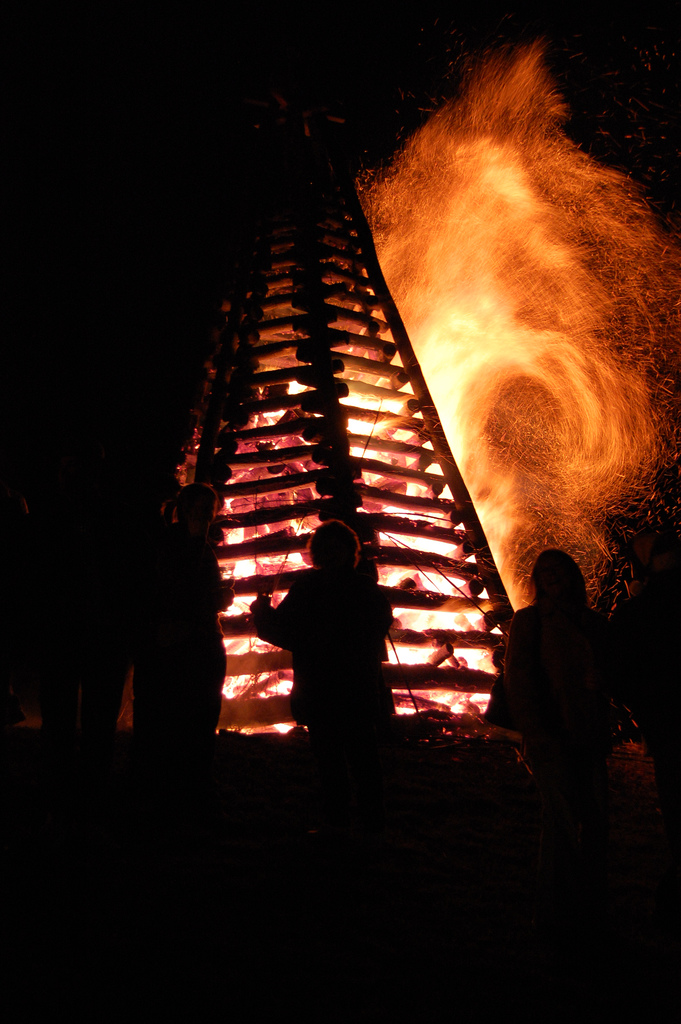
A bonfire burns during a night event in the US

In New England, on the night before the Fourth of July, towns competed to build towering pyramids, assembled from hogsheads, barrels and casks. They were lit at nightfall, to usher in the celebration. The highest were in Salem, Massachusetts, composed of as many as forty tiers of barrels. The practice flourished in the 19th and 20th centuries, and can still be found in some New England towns.

On Christmas Eve in Southern Louisiana bonfires are built along the Mississippi River levees to light the way for Papa Noël as he moves along the river in his pirogue (Cajun canoe) pulled by eight alligators. This tradition is an annual event in St. James Parish, Louisiana.

(See Aggie Bonfire) One of the oldest traditions at Texas A&M University involves the building of a bonfire by students to be burnt before their annual game against The University of Texas. The tradition began in 1909 as little more than a burning trash pile. Eventually students began clearing land in the area, by hand, to harvest thousands of logs needed for its construction. In 1969 Aggie Bonfire set a Guinness world record for tallest bonfire at 109 feet. In 1999, there was an accident where the stack collapsed during construction, killing 12 people and injuring 27 others. The accident led to the university to no longer sanction the building of Bonfire. Since 2002, the student-sponsored group Student Bonfire began building an annual bonfire in the spirit of the original.

== Farm and garden bonfires ==
Bonfires are used on farms, in large gardens and allotments to dispose of waste plant material that is not readily composted. This includes woody material, pernicious weeds, diseased material and material treated with persistent pesticides and herbicides. Such bonfires may be quite small but are often designed to burn slowly for several days so that wet and green material may be reduced to ash by frequently turning the unburnt material into the centre. Such bonfires can also deal with turf and other earthy material. The ash from garden bonfires is a useful source of potash and may be beneficial in improving the soil structure of some soils although such fires must be managed with safety in mind. Garden and farm bonfires are frequently smoky and can cause local nuisance if poorly managed or lit in unsuitable weather conditions.

== See also ==
- Aggie Bonfire; includes 1999 disaster that killed 12 people when it collapsed during construction
- Bonfire Rally
- Easter Fire
- Bonfires of Saint John
- Burning Man
- Effigy
- Fire ritual
- Fireworks
- Gozan no Okuribi
- Holi
- Marzanna
- Midsummer
- Need-fire
- Piano burning
- Saint John's Eve
- Sussex Bonfire Societies
- Wicker man
- Burgbrennen (Luxembourg)
- Hüttenbrennen (Eifel)
- Osterfeuer (German custom at Easter)
- Sechseläuten (Swiss custom in Zürich)
- Biikebrennen (North Frisia)
