= Gozan no Okuribi =

Annual festival in Kyoto, Japan

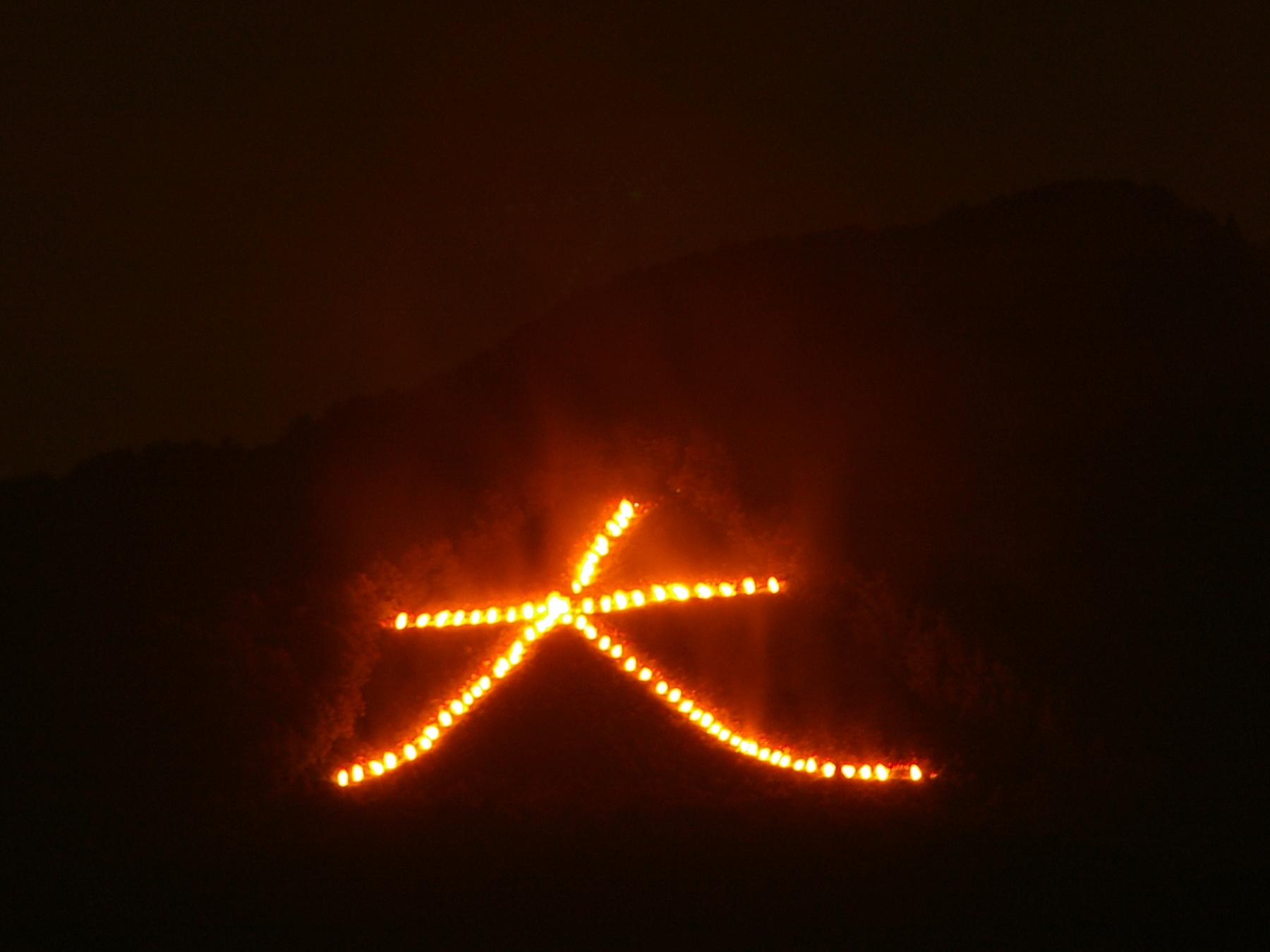
Daimonji

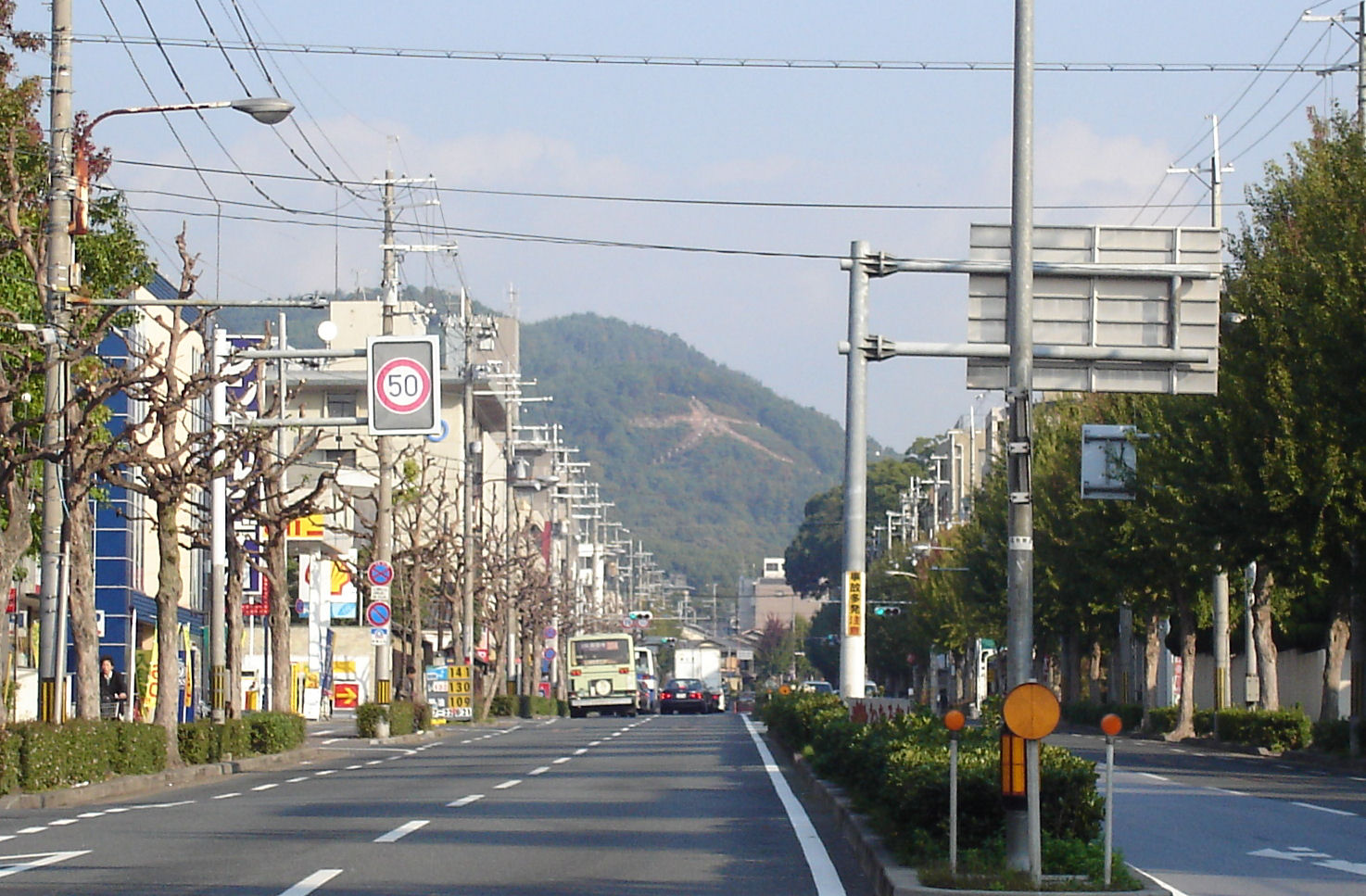
Hidari Daimonji without fire

Gozan no Okuribi (五山送り火, roughly "The Five Mountainous Send-Off Fires"), more commonly known as Daimonji (大文字, roughly "big letter"), is a festival in Kyoto, Japan. It is the culmination of the Obon festival on August 16, in which five giant bonfires are lit on mountains surrounding the city. It signifies the moment when the spirits of deceased family members, who are said to visit this world during Obon, are believed to be returning to the spirit world—thus the name Okuribi (送り火, roughly "send-off fire").

== History ==
The origins of the festival are obscure, but it is believed to be ancient. Specific families have the hereditary duty of organizing all the logistics of the bonfires, and they spend many hours annually providing volunteer labor to maintain this tradition.

== Schedule ==
Starting at 8 pm, the giant bonfires are lit, each with a distinctive shape. Three of the fires form giant kanji characters, and two form familiar shapes. The characters, their locations, meanings, and the lighting times are:

- Daimonji (大文字), the character meaning "large" or "great", is lit on Daimonji-Yama/Higashi-Yama, Nyoigatake at 8 pm;
- Myō/Hō (妙・法), the characters meaning "wondrous dharma" (referring to Buddhist teachings), are lit on Matsugasaki, Nishi-Yama/Higashi-Yama at 8:10 pm;
- Funagata (舟形), the shape of a boat, is lit on Nishigamo, Funa-Yama at 8:15 pm;
- Hidari Daimonji (左大文字), again, the character meaning "large", is lit on Daihoku-San, Hidaridaimonji-San at 8:15 pm;
- Toriigata (鳥居形), the shape of a shrine gate, is lit on Toriimoto, Mandara-San at 8:20 pm.

The most famous—and the first to be lit—is the character dai (大), on Kyoto's Daimonji-yama (大文字山, daimonjiyama). The other four fires are lit at five to ten-minute intervals, and by 8:30, all the characters can be seen. Each bonfire lasts for 30 minutes.

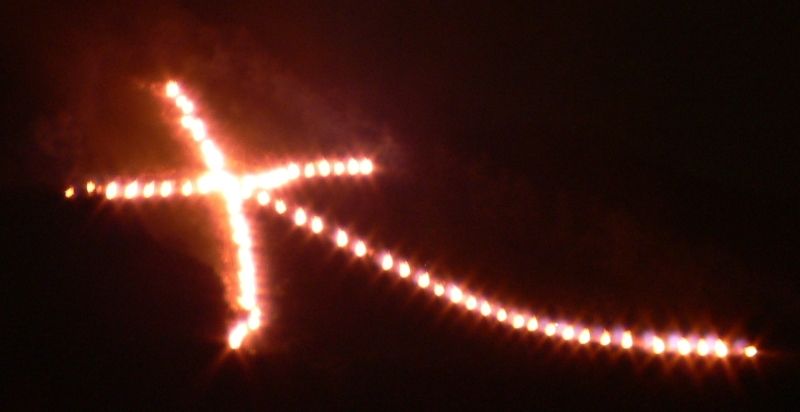
Daimonji (大文字)

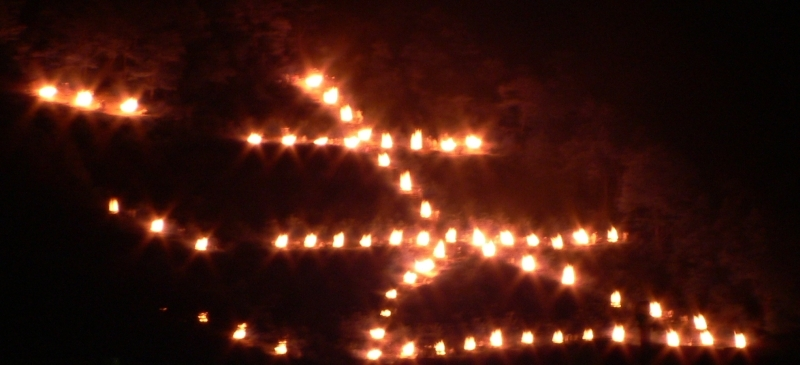
Hō (法)

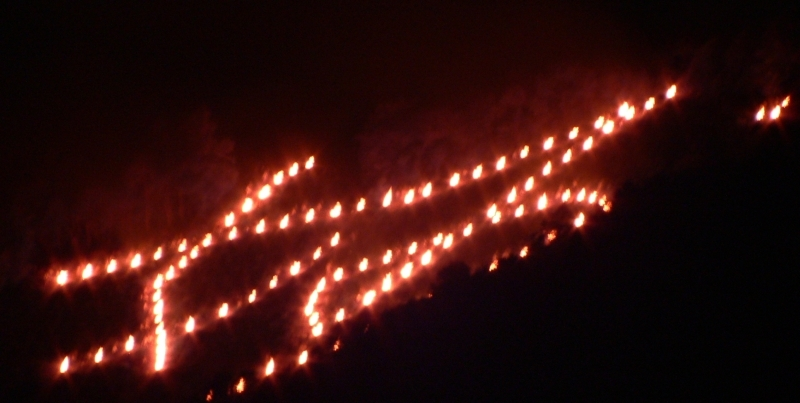
Myō (妙)

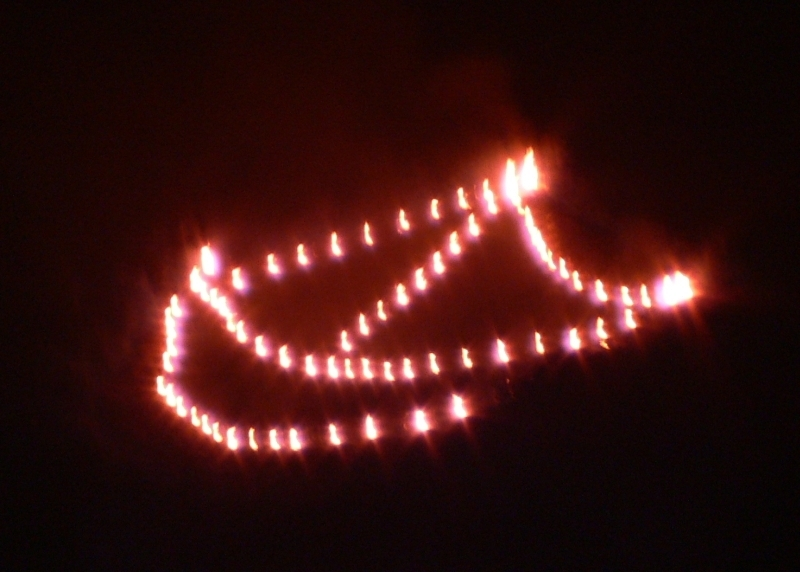
Funagata (舟形)

The 2020 event was significantly scaled back, due to COVID-19, with only six points of "Daimonji" lit and one point lit at each of the other four locations.

== Viewing spots ==
The best place to view the festival is from the Nakagyō Ward, in the center of the city. Many hotels have Daimonji specials where, for a fee, one can see all five fires. Many people also like to go to the Kamo River, between Sanjo and Imadegawa Streets, for an excellent view of the initial fires. More specifically, the following spots are mentioned as good viewing spots:

Area	Location
Daimonji	Kamogawa River banks between the Marutamachi and Misono bridges
Myōhō	Kitayama Street near Notre Dame Elementary School, or the banks of the Takano river around the north side of Takano Bridge
Funagata	Kitayama Street (toward the northwest of Kitayama Ohashi Bridge)
Hidari Daimonji	Nishioji Street between Shijo and the Kinkakuji area
Toriigata	Around Matsuo Bridge or near Hirosawa Pond

== Latitude and longitude ==
- Daimonji: 35°1′23″N 135°48′14″E
- Myō: 35°3′21″N 135°46′32″E
- Hō: 35°3′17″N 135°47′10″E
- Funagata: 35°3′59″N 135°44′3″E
- Hidari Daimonji: 35°2′35.5″N 135°43′53″E
- Toriigata: 35°1′40″N 135°40′5″E
