= 1999 Aggie Bonfire collapse =

Fatal accident at Texas A&M University

Coordinates: 30.6227°N 96.3352°W

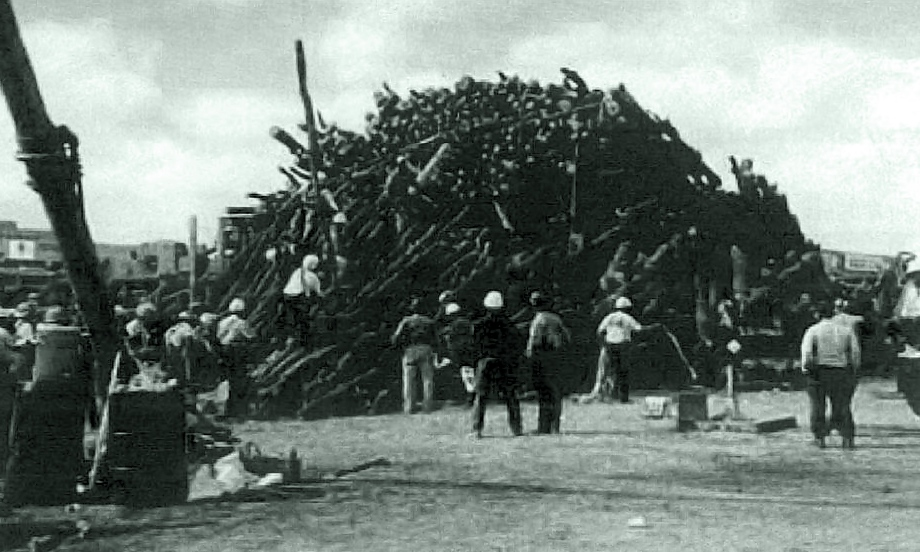
- Recovery operation the morning after the incident
- Date: November 18, 1999; 26 years ago
- Time: 02:42 (CST) (UTC−6)
- Location: College Station, Texas, US
- Cause: Excessive internal stresses on logs and inadequate wiring strength on ties
- Deaths: 12
- Injuries: 27

At approximately 2:42 a.m. on November 18, 1999, the annual Aggie Bonfire at Texas A&M University collapsed during its construction, killing 12 people and injuring 27.

== Collapse ==
The 59-foot-high (18 m) stack, consisting of about 5,000 logs, collapsed during construction. Immediately after the collapse, emergency medical technicians and trained first responders of the Texas A&M Emergency Care Team (TAMECT), a student-run volunteer service, who staffed each stage of construction, administered first aid to the victims. TAMECT alerted the University Police and University EMS, who dispatched all remaining university medics, and requested mutual aid from surrounding agencies. In addition to the mutual aid received from the College Station and Bryan, Texas EMS, Fire, and Police Departments, members of Texas Task Force 1, the state's elite emergency response team, arrived to assist the rescue efforts.

Within minutes of the collapse, word of the accident spread among students and the community. Before sunrise, the accident was the subject of news reports around the world. Within hours, 50 news satellite trucks were broadcasting from the Texas A&M campus.

Rescue operations took over 24 hours; the pace was slowed by the decision to remove many of the logs by hand for fear that using heavy equipment to remove them would cause further collapses, resulting in further injuries to those still trapped. Students, including the entire Texas A&M football team and many members of the university's Corps of Cadets, rushed to the site to assist rescue workers with the manual removal of the logs. The Texas A&M civil engineering department was also called on to examine the site and help the workers determine the order in which the logs could be safely removed, and, at the request of the Texas Forest Service, Steely Lumber Company in Huntsville, Texas, sent log-moving equipment and operators.

== Victims ==
Of the 58 students and former students working on the stack, 12 were killed and 27 were injured. Ten students and one former student were killed in the initial collapse, while another student died in the hospital the next day bringing the death toll to twelve. John Comstock was the last living person to be removed from the stack. He spent months in the hospital following amputation of his left leg and partial paralysis of his right side. He returned to A&M in 2001 to finish his degree.

== Aftermath ==
The university gave the National Forestry Hero Award to an employee of Steely Lumber Co., James Gibson, for rescuing students. By January 2000, Texas A&M spent over $80,000 so students and administrators could travel to the funerals of the deceased, including $40,000 so 125 students and staff could attend a funeral in Turlock, California by way of private aircraft; most of those on board were students. The total amount of funds spent by the university on all disaster-related expenses by that date was $292,000.

For two years, the university pondered options for reinstating the tradition. University president Ray Bowen formed a task force, which proposed a new design. The task force recommended that students be allowed to participate in building the bonfire as long as they were monitored by professional construction experts. Current and former students debated whether the proposed division of labor could be considered a student project. The debate was rendered moot when the university discovered liability insurance for the revamped project would cost more than $2 million per year. In 2002, Bowen announced that the bonfire was officially cancelled. Bowen's successor Robert Gates upheld this decision, stating that a "change in the status quo regarding the future of Bonfire would be inappropriate while litigation is still on-going". In 2002, students formed a non-profit to continue the tradition off-campus.

=== Memorials and vigils ===
At noon, students held an impromptu prayer service in the center of campus, at Rudder Fountain. An official memorial service was held less than seventeen hours after the collapse. Over 16,000 mourners, including then Texas Lieutenant Governor Rick Perry, packed Reed Arena to pay tribute to those who died and those who had spent all day working to rescue the injured. At the end of the service, as A&M University President Ray Bowen presented roses to the families of the dead and injured students, the crowd spontaneously stood in silence, linking arms with those standing next to them, before quietly singing "Amazing Grace". Only after all of the rescue workers and family members had left the facility did the audience depart.

The Texas Exes student chapter canceled Texas' corresponding rivalry pregame tradition, the Hex Rally, in favor of a "Unity Gathering" on November 22 at the UT Tower and extended an invitation to all Aggies and their friends. The tower was darkened out of respect for those who had died in the collapse or been affected by it, and participants lit white candles instead of the usual red in memory of the fallen Aggies.

On November 25, the date that the bonfire would have burned, Aggies instead held a vigil and remembrance ceremony. Over 40,000 people lit candles and observed up to two hours of silence at the site of the collapse, before walking to Kyle Field for yell practice. At the stadium, fans relit their candles as the Parsons Mounted Cavalry fired the Aggie cannon twelve times, once for each victim. Former US President George H. W. Bush attended with his wife Barbara, as did his son George W. Bush, Texas Governor and future US President, with his wife Laura.

The following day, the 24th-ranked Aggies upset the 7th-ranked Texas Longhorns, winning 20–16 in the annual rivalry game. The game began with a flyover of F-16 jets, all piloted by former A&M students, in the missing man formation. US Senator Phil Gramm, who taught economics at A&M from 1967 to 1978, donated the flyover that he was entitled to as an elected official upon his death, asking that the fly-over be given instead in the honor of the 12 Aggies who died. At half-time, the Texas Longhorn Band dedicated their performance to the students lost and injured in the collapse, and ended by playing "Amazing Grace" and "Taps", then removing their white hats in a show of respect as they walked off the field. The Fightin' Texas Aggie Band also played a tribute to the victims and, contrary to the usual tradition, marched off the field in a silent cadence. Aggie students, who normally sit only when the opposing band plays, stood throughout both performances and gave both standing ovations.

The Bonfire Memorial Commission collected the hundreds of thousands of items that were left by grieving visitors at the site of the collapse. At the Systems Building, Texas A&M leaders erected pictures of the deceased students. There, over a dozen seniors left behind their Aggie rings, permanently donating them to the students who did not live long enough to earn their own. Various organizations also established funds in memory of the victims and to help with expenses incurred because of the accident. In total, the funds received exceeded US$250,000.

Kathryn Holmes Smith, of Texas A&M's class of 1973, wrote additional verses of "The Last Corps Trip" in memory of those who died. The poem, originally written by Philo H. "Buddy" Duval Jr. of A&M's class of 1951, imagines a Judgment Day where Aggies are welcomed into Heaven with open arms and is traditionally read at Aggie Muster.

== Investigations ==
A commission created by Texas A&M University discovered that a number of factors led to the bonfire collapse, including "excessive internal stresses" on the logs and "inadequate containment strength" in the wiring used to tie the logs together. The wiring broke after logs from upper tiers were "wedged" into lower tiers.

The Texas Board of Professional Engineers announced in 2000 that the Aggie Bonfire met the requirements to be considered a complex construction project subject to regulation under state engineering laws and would thus have had to be designed and overseen by a professional engineer.

== Legal ==
Parents of students injured or killed in the collapse filed lawsuits against Texas A&M officials, including President Ray Bowen, Vice President of Student Affairs J. Malon Southerland, the 1999 redpots, and the university. In one of the six lawsuits, plaintiffs alleged that A&M officials violated the bonfire victims' right of due process by placing those victims in a "state-created danger" by not ensuring the bonfire's structural integrity and by allowing unqualified students to work on the stack. The plaintiffs pointed to a $2 million liability policy the university obtained in 1996 and accidental death and dismemberment insurance policies that the university obtained for student workers as early as 1987 as proof that the administrators knew of the dangers of the bonfire. Texas A&M maintains that the insurance policies were actually purchased by an advisory committee to the bonfire and not the university. On May 21, 2004, US Federal Judge Samuel B. Kent dismissed all claims against the Texas A&M officials. In 2005, 36 of the 64 original defendants, including all of the redpots, settled their portion of the case for an estimated $4.25 million, paid by their insurance companies. The 5th U.S. Circuit Court of Appeals dismissed the remaining lawsuits against Texas A&M and its officials in April 2007. In October 2007, the U.S. Supreme Court declined to review the appeals court ruling.

On October 28, 2008, Texas A&M settled the final lawsuit filed against them by the victims and their families. The university agreed to pay $2.1 million and promised that if the bonfire returned to campus that "engineering oversight" would be provided. The final lawsuit, filed against two companies that provided crane operators and cranes for the bonfire, was settled in April 2014.

== Controversies ==
On November 19, 1999, The Arizona Republic released a political cartoon by Steve Benson titled "Texas Bonfire Traditions" that compared the collapse to the Waco siege of 1993 and the 1998 murder of James Byrd Jr. This prompted criticism and negative reactions from the Texas A&M community, and the Republic removed the cartoon. People sent thousands of e-mails about the cartoon to the newspaper offices. On December 1, the newspaper sent a total of $10,000 in two checks as a peace offering to the university, with $5,000 to the Bonfire Memorial Fund and $5,000 to the Bonfire Relief Fund. The TAMU administration declined to accept the money and returned the checks. TAMU president Ray Bowen stated "Texas A&M will not allow itself to become an agent for The Arizona Republic as it tries to manage the public criticism it is receiving."

Detractors further blamed the school for the accident, saying that, in the name of tradition, administrators turned a blind eye to an unsafe structure being constructed with minimal engineering and safety protocols. Before the collapse, some people, such as Texas A&M engineering professor Theodore Hirsch, expressed concerns about the safety of the bonfire, citing the partial collapse that occurred in a previous bonfire, the progressively shorter bonfire burn times which had dropped from several hours to collapsing in less than 20 minutes, and numerous incidents involving alcohol or unsafe horseplay at the bonfire site. One of the students killed in the 1999 bonfire collapse was under the legal drinking age, yet a toxicology test showed high blood-alcohol levels; however, lower readings in a second test and inconsistencies in the initial sampling and annotation methods led to questions about the accuracy of the original tests.
