= Texas Board of Professional Engineers and Land Surveyors =

Government agency in Texas, United States

Texas Board of Professional Engineers and Land Surveyors (TBPELS) is a state agency of Texas, headquartered in Austin, that regulates and licenses the practices of engineering and land surveying in the state.

Established in 1937 as the Texas Board of Professional Engineers, the agency was restructured in June 2019 when Governor Greg Abbott signed Texas House Bill 1523. This bill merged the Texas Board of Professional Engineers and the Texas Board of Professional Land Surveying into the Texas Board of Professional Engineers and Land Surveyors, effective September 1, 2019.
