= Mason Contractors Association of America =

The Mason Contractors Association of America (MCAA) is a trade association in the United States of America representing mason contractors.

== Activities ==
MCAA promotes building codes and standards for mason contractors and designers such as the ASTM, MSJC, ASCE, and the IBC.

Each year, MCAA conducts the MCAA Convention which includes the annual meeting and educational programming. The association conducts various classes. Some programs include Masonry Foreman Development, Basic Masonry Estimating, Masonry Quality Institute, and other topics such as Masonry Wall Bracing and Understanding Masonry Codes and Standards.

The MCAA provides information on careers in masonry to students, parents and high schools. The MCAA supports the establishment of both pre-apprentice and apprenticeship programs and assists local training programs.

== Organizational structure ==
The full board consists of a Chairman, Chairman Elect, Treasurer, Secretary and nine Regional Vice Presidents. In addition, State Chairmen serve for each state and thirteen Committees help drive the association.

The Mason Contractors Association of America has a full-time staff in Washington, D.C.
